= Vienna (National Council electoral district) =

Parliamentary electoral district in Austria

- Wien
- Electoral District for the National Council
- Location of Vienna within Austria
- State: Vienna
- Population: 2,005,760 (2024)
- Electorate: 1,149,664 (2019)
- Area: 415 km^{2} (2023)

Current Electoral District
- Created: 1923
- Seats: List: 33 (2002–present); 34 (1994–2002); 36 (1983–1994); 39 (1975–1983); 42 (1971–1975); 38 (1962–1971); 40 (1953–1962); 46 (1945–1953); 45 (1923–1945)
- Members: List: Pia Philippa Beck (Ind); Dagmar Belakowitsch (FPÖ); Eva Blimlinger (GRÜNE); Romana Deckenbacher (ÖVP); Meri Disoski (GRÜNE); Faika El-Nagashi (GRÜNE); Martin Engelberg (ÖVP); Kai Jan Krainer (SPÖ); Stephanie Krisper (NEOS); Andrea Kuntzl (SPÖ); Christoph Matznetter (SPÖ); Sigrid Maurer (GRÜNE); Beate Meinl-Reisinger (NEOS); Maria Neumann (ÖVP); Maria-Theresia Niss (ÖVP); Yannick Shetty (NEOS)

Vienna (German: Wien), also known as Electoral District 9 (German: Wahlkreis 9), is one of the nine multi-member state electoral districts of the National Council, the lower house of the Austrian Parliament, the national legislature of Austria. The electoral district was created as Electoral Union I (German: Wahlkreisverband I) in 1923 when electoral regulations were amended to add electoral unions to the existing electoral districts. It was renamed Vienna in 1971 following the re-organisation of electoral districts across Austria. It is conterminous with the city-state of Vienna. The electoral district currently elects 33 of the 183 members of the National Council using the open party-list proportional representation electoral system. At the 2019 legislative election the constituency had 1,149,664 registered electors.

== History ==
Electoral Union I was one four electoral unions (wahlkreisverband) established by the "Electoral Regulations for the National Council" (Wahlordnung für den Nationalrat) passed by the National Council in 1923 and was conterminous with the city of Vienna. It was divided into seven lower tier electoral districts - Vienna Inner East, Vienna Inner West, Vienna North East, Vienna North West, Vienna South East, Vienna South West and Vienna West - which together had 45 seats. In 1934 the rump National Council (Rumpfnationalrat), controlled by the fascist Christian Social Party as the Social Democratic Workers' Party had been banned, imposed the May constitution (Maiverfassung) which replaced the democratic First Austrian Republic with the corporate authoritarian Federal State of Austria.

The fascists were defeated by the Allies in 1945 and democracy restored. The electoral system which existed prior to 1934, including the electoral districts, were largely restored by the constitutional law of October 1945. The seven lower tier electoral districts in Electoral Union I together had 46 seats. Electoral regulations require the allocation of seats amongst the electoral districts to be recalculated following each national census and in October 1952 the number of seats allocated to Electoral Union I was reduced to 40 based on the population as at the 1951 national census. Liesing, which had been incorporated into the city of Vienna as its 23rd district in 1954, was added to Vienna South West/Electoral Union I in December 1958. The number of seats allocated to Electoral Union I was reduced to 38 in May 1962 based on the population as at the 1961 national census.

The "National Council Election Regulations 1971" (Nationalrats-Wahlordnung 1971) passed by the National Council in November 1970 replaced the lower tier electoral districts with nine state electoral districts (landeswahlkreise) conterminous with the nine states of Austria. Two upper tier electoral unions were created and Vienna was grouped together with the states of Burgenland and Lower Austria to form Electoral Union I (also known as Electoral Union East). The newly created Vienna electoral district was initially allocated 42 seats in January 1971. The number of seats allocated to Vienna was reduced to 39 in February 1972 based on the population as at the 1971 national census. The number of seats allocated to Vienna was reduced to 35 in February 1982 based on the population as at the 1981 national census. However, in December 1982 the Constitutional Court ruled that this allocation of seats was unlawful and in February 1983 the number of seats allocated to Vienna was increased to 36.

The "National Council Electoral Regulations 1992" (Nationalrats-Wahlordnung 1992) passed by the National Council in 1992 established 43 regional electoral districts (regionalwahlkreise), a new third tier of electoral districts, whilst keeping the state electoral districts. Vienna was divided into seven regional electoral districts - Vienna Inner East, Vienna Inner South, Vienna Inner West, Vienna North, Vienna North West, Vienna South and Vienna South West. Vienna was allocated 34 seats in May 1993. The number of seats allocated to Vienna was reduced to 33 in September 2002 based on the population as at the 2001 national census.

== Electoral system ==
1994 to date
Vienna currently elects 33 of the 183 members of the National Council using the open party-list proportional representation electoral system. The allocation of seats is carried out in three stages. In the first stage, seats are allocated to parties (lists) at the regional level using a state-wide Hare quota (wahlzahl) (valid votes in the state divided by the number of seats in the state). In the second stage, seats are allocated to parties at the state/provincial level using the state-wide Hare quota (any seats won by the party at the regional stage are subtracted from the party's state seats). In the third and final stage, seats are allocated to parties at the federal/national level using the D'Hondt method (any seats won by the party at the regional and state stages are subtracted from the party's federal seats). Only parties that reach the 4% national threshold, or have won a seat at the regional stage, compete for seats at the state and federal stages.

Electors may cast one preferential vote for individual candidates at the regional, state and federal levels. Split-ticket voting (panachage), or voting for more than one candidate at each level, is not permitted and will result in the ballot paper being invalidated. At the regional level, candidates must receive preferential votes amounting to at least 14% of the valid votes cast for their party to over-ride the order of the party list (10% and 7% respectively for the state and federal levels). Prior to April 2013 electors could not cast preferential votes at the federal level and the thresholds candidates needed to over-ride the party list order were higher at the regional level (half the Hare quota or 1/6 of the party votes) and state level (Hare quota).

1971 to 1994
Allocation of seats was carried out in two stages. In the first stage, seats were allocated to parties at the state level using the Hare quota. In the second stage, surplus votes and unallocated seats from the first stage were aggregated at the electoral union level and allocated to parties using the D'Hondt method. Only parties that won a seat at the state stage, in any state, competed for seats at the electoral union stage. Electors could cast one preferential vote for individual candidates at the state level but a candidate needed to receive preferential votes amounting to at least the Hare quota to over-ride the party list order. The allocation of seats to candidates at the electoral union level was based solely on party list order i.e. a closed list.

1923 to 1971
Allocation of seats was carried out in two stages. In the first stage, seats were allocated to parties at the district level using the Droop quota (also known as the Hagenbach-Bischoff method). In the second stage, surplus votes and unallocated seats from the first stage were aggregated at the electoral union level and allocated to parties using the D'Hondt method. Only parties that won a seat at the district stage, in any district, competed for seats at the electoral union stage.

Electors could also cast preferential votes for individual candidates either by voting for the list in the order submiited by the party or by ranking the candidates in preferred order. Candidates were then awarded points using the Borda count with the top candidate receiving as many points as there were candidates on the list etc. If a voter choose to rank individual candidates but did not award rankings to some the candidates on the list, these candidates were awarded the remaining points in order of their position on the party list. If a voter had struck out any candidate on the list that candidate did not receive any points. The seats won by the party were allocated to the candidates with the most points on the list.

== Election results ==
=== Summary ===
| Election | Communists KPÖ+ / KPÖ / KLS / VO / LB / KPÖ | | | Social Democrats SPÖ / SDAPÖ | | | Greens GRÜNE / ALÖ | | | NEOS NEOS / LiF | | | People's ÖVP / CSP-HW / EL / CSP | | | Freedom FPÖ / WdU / DPÖ | | |
| Election | Votes | % | Seats | Votes | % | Seats | Votes | % | Seats | Votes | % | Seats | Votes | % | Seats | Votes | % | Seats |
|---|---|---|---|---|---|---|---|---|---|---|---|---|---|---|---|---|---|---|
| 2019 | 6,432 | 0.78% | 0 | 222,554 | 27.11% | 8 | 169,866 | 20.69% | 6 | 80,964 | 9.86% | 3 | 202,180 | 24.63% | 8 | 105,289 | 12.83% | 4 |
| 2017 | 11,991 | 1.38% | 0 | 300,664 | 34.49% | 11 | 51,398 | 5.90% | 0 | 56,323 | 6.46% | 2 | 188,273 | 21.60% | 7 | 186,088 | 21.35% | 7 |
| 2013 | 13,187 | 1.66% | 0 | 251,623 | 31.64% | 10 | 130,492 | 16.41% | 5 | 60,812 | 7.65% | 2 | 115,316 | 14.50% | 4 | 163,501 | 20.56% | 6 |
| 2008 | 9,057 | 1.08% | 0 | 292,371 | 34.79% | 11 | 134,096 | 15.96% | 5 | 34,880 | 4.15% | 0 | 140,530 | 16.72% | 5 | 171,658 | 20.43% | 6 |
| 2006 | 9,841 | 1.22% | 0 | 331,828 | 41.04% | 13 | 140,508 | 17.38% | 5 | | | | 176,524 | 21.83% | 7 | 112,098 | 13.86% | 4 |
| 2002 | 5,197 | 0.61% | 0 | 373,436 | 43.77% | 14 | 129,141 | 15.14% | 4 | 10,061 | 1.18% | 0 | 261,496 | 30.65% | 10 | 67,975 | 7.97% | 2 |
| 1999 | 7,081 | 0.88% | 0 | 305,225 | 37.85% | 12 | 83,274 | 10.33% | 3 | 56,131 | 6.96% | 0 | 136,966 | 16.99% | 5 | 199,758 | 24.77% | 8 |
| 1995 | 3,421 | 0.39% | 0 | 383,991 | 43.98% | 14 | 52,764 | 6.04% | 2 | 75,349 | 8.63% | 2 | 170,659 | 19.55% | 6 | 175,217 | 20.07% | 6 |
| 1994 | 3,537 | 0.43% | 0 | 313,678 | 38.48% | 13 | 79,543 | 9.76% | 3 | 82,144 | 10.08% | 3 | 139,688 | 17.14% | 5 | 185,206 | 22.72% | 7 |
| 1990 | 6,777 | 0.83% | 0 | 416,022 | 50.70% | 18 | 62,560 | 7.62% | 2 | | | | 173,086 | 21.09% | 7 | 129,062 | 15.73% | 5 |
| 1986 | 9,345 | 1.02% | 0 | 477,557 | 52.35% | 18 | 55,571 | 6.09% | 2 | | | | 303,109 | 33.23% | 11 | 52,525 | 5.76% | 2 |
| 1983 | 9,620 | 0.98% | 0 | 554,663 | 56.57% | 20 | 13,696 | 1.40% | 0 | | | | 329,883 | 33.64% | 12 | 42,948 | 4.38% | 1 |
| 1979 | 15,003 | 1.49% | 0 | 610,360 | 60.60% | 23 | | | | | | | 334,088 | 33.17% | 12 | 47,694 | 4.74% | 1 |
| 1975 | 20,739 | 1.99% | 0 | 624,072 | 59.84% | 23 | | | | | | | 354,453 | 33.99% | 13 | 42,638 | 4.09% | 1 |
| 1971 | 22,941 | 2.13% | 0 | 641,596 | 59.49% | 24 | | | | | | | 365,266 | 33.87% | 14 | 46,794 | 4.34% | 1 |
| 1970 | 15,689 | 1.48% | 0 | 622,923 | 58.66% | 23 | | | | | | | 371,027 | 34.94% | 14 | 43,182 | 4.07% | 1 |
| 1966 | 18,636 | 1.65% | 0 | 557,496 | 49.37% | 21 | | | | | | | 427,760 | 37.88% | 16 | 45,527 | 4.03% | 1 |
| 1962 | 57,287 | 5.04% | 0 | 595,265 | 52.42% | 22 | | | | | | | 391,985 | 34.52% | 14 | 74,855 | 6.59% | 2 |
| 1959 | 64,794 | 5.81% | 0 | 584,486 | 52.38% | 23 | | | | | | | 383,534 | 34.37% | 15 | 83,077 | 7.44% | 2 |
| 1956 | 96,618 | 8.54% | 2 | 562,763 | 49.74% | 22 | | | | | | | 406,570 | 35.93% | 15 | 63,462 | 5.61% | 1 |
| 1953 | 93,938 | 7.98% | 2 | 590,532 | 50.15% | 22 | | | | | | | 362,148 | 30.75% | 13 | 124,683 | 10.59% | 3 |
| 1949 | 89,710 | 7.85% | 3 | 565,440 | 49.51% | 24 | | | | | | | 401,854 | 35.18% | 17 | 79,149 | 6.93% | 2 |
| 1945 | 70,307 | 7.91% | 2 | 508,214 | 57.15% | 28 | | | | | | | 310,803 | 34.95% | 16 | | | |
| 1930 | 10,601 | 0.89% | 0 | 703,418 | 58.98% | 30 | | | | | | | 282,879 | 23.72% | 11 | | | |
| 1927 | 7,521 | 0.65% | 0 | 693,621 | 59.62% | 29 | | | | | | | 423,615 | 36.41% | 16 | | | |
| 1923 | 13,564 | 1.32% | 0 | 571,464 | 55.53% | 27 | | | | | | | 337,783 | 32.83% | 16 | | | |

=== Detailed ===
Party has received at least 4% of the vote nationally or won a seat at the regional stage and is entitled to compete for state seats (since 1994); or won a seat at the district stage and is entitled to compete for electoral union seats (prior to 1971).

==== 2010s ====
===== 2019 =====
Results of the 2019 legislative election held on 29 September 2019:

| Party | | Vienna Inner East | | Vienna Inner South | | Vienna Inner West | | Vienna North | | Vienna North West | | Vienna South | | Vienna South West | | Total votes | % | Seats | | |
| Party | | Votes | Seats | Votes | Seats | Votes | Seats | Votes | Seats | Votes | Seats | Votes | Seats | Votes | Seats | Total votes | % | Reg. | Stat. | Tot. |
|---|---|---|---|---|---|---|---|---|---|---|---|---|---|---|---|---|---|---|---|---|
| Social Democratic Party of Austria | SPÖ | 22,046 | 0 | 19,040 | 0 | 14,315 | 0 | 47,968 | 1 | 29,006 | 1 | 51,006 | 2 | 39,173 | 1 | 222,554 | 27.11% | 5 | 3 | 8 |
| Austrian People's Party | ÖVP | 14,571 | 0 | 17,917 | 0 | 16,990 | 0 | 42,688 | 1 | 33,561 | 1 | 34,208 | 1 | 42,245 | 1 | 202,180 | 24.63% | 4 | 4 | 8 |
| The Greens – The Green Alternative | GRÜNE | 18,363 | 0 | 22,548 | 0 | 24,037 | 0 | 22,255 | 0 | 30,650 | 1 | 20,526 | 0 | 31,487 | 1 | 169,866 | 20.69% | 2 | 4 | 6 |
| Freedom Party of Austria | FPÖ | 8,227 | 0 | 6,786 | 0 | 4,926 | 0 | 28,861 | 1 | 12,396 | 0 | 25,235 | 1 | 18,858 | 0 | 105,289 | 12.83% | 2 | 2 | 4 |
| NEOS – The New Austria and Liberal Forum | NEOS | 6,347 | 0 | 9,627 | 0 | 10,517 | 0 | 12,884 | 0 | 15,297 | 0 | 9,750 | 0 | 16,542 | 0 | 80,964 | 9.86% | 0 | 3 | 3 |
| JETZT | JETZT | 2,153 | 0 | 2,669 | 0 | 2,795 | 0 | 4,515 | 0 | 3,880 | 0 | 3,836 | 0 | 4,446 | 0 | 24,294 | 2.96% | 0 | 0 | 0 |
| KPÖ Plus | KPÖ+ | 752 | 0 | 724 | 0 | 643 | 0 | 1,043 | 0 | 1,008 | 0 | 1,207 | 0 | 1,055 | 0 | 6,432 | 0.78% | 0 | 0 | 0 |
| The Beer Party | BIER | 421 | 0 | 359 | 0 | 256 | 0 | 1,391 | 0 | 547 | 0 | 1,097 | 0 | 875 | 0 | 4,946 | 0.60% | 0 | 0 | 0 |
| Der Wandel | WANDL | 463 | 0 | 475 | 0 | 401 | 0 | 830 | 0 | 709 | 0 | 749 | 0 | 762 | 0 | 4,389 | 0.53% | 0 | 0 | 0 |
| Valid Votes | | 73,343 | 0 | 80,145 | 0 | 74,880 | 0 | 162,435 | 3 | 127,054 | 3 | 147,614 | 4 | 155,443 | 3 | 820,914 | 100.00% | 13 | 16 | 29 |
| Rejected Votes | | 558 | | 440 | | 347 | | 1,653 | | 883 | | 1,546 | | 1,142 | | 6,653 (Note: Includes 84 unassigned rejected votes.) | 0.80% | | | |
| Total Polled | | 73,901 | | 80,585 | | 75,227 | | 164,088 | | 127,937 | | 149,160 | | 156,585 | | 827,567 | 71.98% | | | |
| Registered Electors | | 106,083 | | 107,413 | | 94,800 | | 234,239 | | 170,992 | | 225,324 | | 210,813 | | 1,149,664 | | | | |
| Turnout | | 69.66% | | 75.02% | | 79.35% | | 70.05% | | 74.82% | | 66.20% | | 74.28% | | 71.98% | | | | |

The following candidates were elected:

- State seats (party mandates) - Dagmar Belakowitsch (FPÖ), 497 votes; Eva Blimlinger (GRÜNE), 1,694 votes; Gernot Blümel (ÖVP), 7,343 votes; Meri Disoski (GRÜNE), 280 votes; Faika El-Nagashi (GRÜNE), 1,231 votes; Kai Jan Krainer (SPÖ), 379 votes; Stephanie Krisper (NEOS), 686 votes; Andrea Kuntzl (SPÖ), 105 votes; Karl Mahrer (ÖVP), 637 votes; Christoph Matznetter (SPÖ), 169 votes; Sigrid Maurer (GRÜNE), 3,737 votes; Beate Meinl-Reisinger (NEOS), 2,806 votes; Maria-Theresia Niss (ÖVP), 549 votes; Yannick Shetty (NEOS), 390 votes; Maria Smodics-Neumann (ÖVP), 246 votes; and Philippa Strache (FPÖ), 1,973 votes. (Note: SPÖ: 1st placed candidate Pamela Rendi-Wagner was elected on the federal list; 2nd placed candidate Doris Bures was elected in Vienna South West; and 4th placed candidate Harald Troch was elected in Vienna South.) (Note: Grüne: 1st placed candidate Lukas Hammer was elected in Vienna North West; and 2nd placed candidate Ewa Ernst-Dziedzic was elected in Vienna South West.) (Note: FPÖ: 2nd placed candidate Harald Stefan was elected in Vienna South.)

Substitutions:

- Gernot Blümel (ÖVP) resigned on 7 January 2020 and was replaced by Romana Deckenbacher (ÖVP) on 9 January 2020.
- Karl Mahrer (ÖVP) resigned on 17 December 2021 and was replaced by Martin Engelberg (ÖVP).

===== 2017 =====
Results of the 2017 legislative election held on 15 October 2017:

| Party | | Vienna Inner East | | Vienna Inner South | | Vienna Inner West | | Vienna North | | Vienna North West | | Vienna South | | Vienna South West | | Total votes | % | Seats | | |
| Party | | Votes | Seats | Votes | Seats | Votes | Seats | Votes | Seats | Votes | Seats | Votes | Seats | Votes | Seats | Total votes | % | Reg. | Stat. | Tot. |
|---|---|---|---|---|---|---|---|---|---|---|---|---|---|---|---|---|---|---|---|---|
| Social Democratic Party of Austria | SPÖ | 30,435 | 1 | 29,167 | 1 | 25,290 | 0 | 60,380 | 2 | 42,286 | 1 | 60,624 | 2 | 52,482 | 1 | 300,664 | 34.49% | 8 | 3 | 11 |
| Austrian People's Party | ÖVP | 13,356 | 0 | 18,469 | 0 | 19,159 | 0 | 34,889 | 1 | 34,031 | 1 | 28,153 | 1 | 40,216 | 1 | 188,273 | 21.60% | 4 | 3 | 7 |
| Freedom Party of Austria | FPÖ | 14,931 | 0 | 11,793 | 0 | 7,771 | 0 | 51,325 | 1 | 21,453 | 0 | 45,786 | 1 | 33,029 | 1 | 186,088 | 21.35% | 3 | 4 | 7 |
| Peter Pilz List | PILZ | 6,352 | 0 | 7,914 | 0 | 8,170 | 0 | 10,699 | 0 | 10,867 | 0 | 9,093 | 0 | 12,403 | 0 | 65,498 | 7.51% | 0 | 2 | 2 |
| NEOS – The New Austria and Liberal Forum | NEOS | 4,525 | 0 | 6,948 | 0 | 7,549 | 0 | 8,133 | 0 | 10,930 | 0 | 6,721 | 0 | 11,517 | 0 | 56,323 | 6.46% | 0 | 2 | 2 |
| The Greens – The Green Alternative | GRÜNE | 6,066 | 0 | 7,012 | 0 | 7,978 | 0 | 5,589 | 0 | 9,929 | 0 | 5,561 | 0 | 9,263 | 0 | 51,398 | 5.90% | 0 | 0 | 0 |
| Communist Party of Austria | KPÖ | 1,423 | 0 | 1,598 | 0 | 1,505 | 0 | 1,568 | 0 | 2,080 | 0 | 1,816 | 0 | 2,001 | 0 | 11,991 | 1.38% | 0 | 0 | 0 |
| My Vote Counts! | GILT | 697 | 0 | 660 | 0 | 539 | 0 | 1,842 | 0 | 1,102 | 0 | 1,487 | 0 | 1,350 | 0 | 7,677 | 0.88% | 0 | 0 | 0 |
| The Whites | WEIßE | 96 | 0 | 92 | 0 | 56 | 0 | 201 | 0 | 140 | 0 | 165 | 0 | 180 | 0 | 930 | 0.11% | 0 | 0 | 0 |
| Free List Austria | FLÖ | 94 | 0 | 59 | 0 | 56 | 0 | 193 | 0 | 123 | 0 | 178 | 0 | 143 | 0 | 846 | 0.10% | 0 | 0 | 0 |
| Homeless in Politics | ODP | 93 | 0 | 57 | 0 | 38 | 0 | 148 | 0 | 117 | 0 | 167 | 0 | 141 | 0 | 761 | 0.09% | 0 | 0 | 0 |
| EU Exit Party | EUAUS | 65 | 0 | 43 | 0 | 47 | 0 | 155 | 0 | 88 | 0 | 175 | 0 | 120 | 0 | 693 | 0.08% | 0 | 0 | 0 |
| Socialist Left Party | SLP | 78 | 0 | 46 | 0 | 31 | 0 | 99 | 0 | 86 | 0 | 125 | 0 | 65 | 0 | 530 | 0.06% | 0 | 0 | 0 |
| Valid Votes | | 78,211 | 1 | 83,858 | 1 | 78,189 | 0 | 175,221 | 4 | 133,232 | 2 | 160,051 | 4 | 162,910 | 3 | 871,672 | 100.00% | 15 | 14 | 29 |
| Rejected Votes | | 645 | | 511 | | 334 | | 1,629 | | 905 | | 1,581 | | 1,153 | | 6,902 (Note: Includes 144 unassigned rejected votes.) | 0.79% | | | |
| Total Polled | | 78,856 | | 84,369 | | 78,523 | | 176,850 | | 134,137 | | 161,632 | | 164,063 | | 878,574 | 76.12% | | | |
| Registered Electors | | 107,757 | | 108,806 | | 96,347 | | 232,205 | | 172,570 | | 226,187 | | 210,312 | | 1,154,184 | | | | |
| Turnout | | 73.18% | | 77.54% | | 81.50% | | 76.16% | | 77.73% | | 71.46% | | 78.01% | | 76.12% | | | | |

The following candidates were elected:

- State seats (party mandates) - Stephanie Cox (PILZ), 372 votes; Muna Duzdar (SPÖ), 821 votes; Claudia Gamon (NEOS), 757 votes; Martin Graf (FPÖ), 184 votes; Hans-Jörg Jenewein (FPÖ), 33 votes; Stephanie Krisper (NEOS), 214 votes; Andrea Kuntzl (SPÖ), 183 votes; Jessi Lintl (FPÖ), 37 votes; Karl Mahrer (ÖVP), 1,831 votes; Karl Nehammer (ÖVP), 575 votes; Maria Niss (ÖVP), 734 votes; Andreas Schieder (SPÖ), 550 votes; Petra Steger (FPÖ), 361 votes; and Wolfgang Zinggl (PILZ), 299 votes. (Note: SPÖ: 1st placed candidate Christian Kern was elected on the federal list; 2nd placed candidate Doris Bures was elected in Vienna South West; and 5th placed candidate Kai Jan Krainer was elected in Vienna Inner South.) (Note: FPÖ: 1st placed candidate Heinz-Christian Strache was elected on the federal list; 3rd placed candidate Johann Gudenus renounced his mandate; 4th placed candidate Markus Tschank was elected in Vienna South West; 5th placed candidate Veronika Matiasek renounced her mandate; 7th placed candidate David Lasar was elected in Vienna North; 8th placed candidate Elisabeth Schmidt renounced her mandate; 9th placed candidate Hubert Fuchs was elected in Vienna South; 10th placed candidate Andreas Karlsböck renounced his mandate; and 12th placed candidate Harald Vilimsky renounced his mandate.) (Note: NEOS: 1st placed candidate Beate Meinl-Reisinger was elected on the federal list.)

Substitutions:

- Karl Mahrer (ÖVP) was reassigned to the federal list seat vacated by Sebastian Kurz and was replaced by Maria Smodics-Neumann (ÖVP) in Vienna on 24 January 2018.
- Petra Steger (FPÖ) was reassigned to the federal list seat vacated by Maximilian Krauss and was replaced by Johann Gudenus (FPÖ) in Vienna on 20 December 2017.
- Johann Gudenus (FPÖ) resigned on 21 May 2019 and was replaced by Ricarda Berger (FPÖ) on 24 May 2019.
- Claudia Gamon (NEOS) resigned on 30 June 2019 and was replaced by Michael Bernhard (NEOS).
- Andreas Schieder (SPÖ) resigned on 1 July 2019 and was replaced by Christoph Matznetter (SPÖ) on 2 July 2019.

===== 2013 =====
Results of the 2013 legislative election held on 29 September 2013:

| Party | | Vienna Inner East | | Vienna Inner South | | Vienna Inner West | | Vienna North | | Vienna North West | | Vienna South | | Vienna South West | | Total votes | % | Seats | | |
| Party | | Votes | Seats | Votes | Seats | Votes | Seats | Votes | Seats | Votes | Seats | Votes | Seats | Votes | Seats | Total votes | % | Reg. | Stat. | Tot. |
|---|---|---|---|---|---|---|---|---|---|---|---|---|---|---|---|---|---|---|---|---|
| Social Democratic Party of Austria | SPÖ | 24,903 | 1 | 20,753 | 0 | 14,968 | 0 | 56,819 | 2 | 32,116 | 1 | 56,961 | 2 | 45,103 | 1 | 251,623 | 31.64% | 7 | 3 | 10 |
| Freedom Party of Austria | FPÖ | 13,696 | 0 | 10,772 | 0 | 7,020 | 0 | 42,494 | 1 | 19,908 | 0 | 40,865 | 1 | 28,746 | 1 | 163,501 | 20.56% | 3 | 3 | 6 |
| The Greens – The Green Alternative | GRÜNE | 14,118 | 0 | 18,401 | 0 | 19,573 | 0 | 16,260 | 0 | 23,237 | 0 | 14,964 | 0 | 23,939 | 0 | 130,492 | 16.41% | 0 | 5 | 5 |
| Austrian People's Party | ÖVP | 8,132 | 0 | 12,418 | 0 | 13,589 | 0 | 16,083 | 0 | 23,512 | 0 | 15,507 | 0 | 26,075 | 1 | 115,316 | 14.50% | 1 | 3 | 4 |
| NEOS – The New Austria | NEOS | 4,646 | 0 | 7,695 | 0 | 9,170 | 0 | 7,941 | 0 | 12,133 | 0 | 6,694 | 0 | 12,533 | 0 | 60,812 | 7.65% | 0 | 2 | 2 |
| Team Stronach | FRANK | 2,582 | 0 | 2,560 | 0 | 2,294 | 0 | 6,944 | 0 | 4,531 | 0 | 6,035 | 0 | 6,082 | 0 | 31,028 | 3.90% | 0 | 1 | 1 |
| Alliance for the Future of Austria | BZÖ | 1,361 | 0 | 1,672 | 0 | 1,512 | 0 | 4,101 | 0 | 3,049 | 0 | 3,224 | 0 | 4,021 | 0 | 18,940 | 2.38% | 0 | 0 | 0 |
| Communist Party of Austria | KPÖ | 1,531 | 0 | 1,667 | 0 | 1,595 | 0 | 2,002 | 0 | 2,075 | 0 | 2,110 | 0 | 2,207 | 0 | 13,187 | 1.66% | 0 | 0 | 0 |
| Pirate Party of Austria | PIRAT | 789 | 0 | 867 | 0 | 821 | 0 | 1,393 | 0 | 1,261 | 0 | 1,257 | 0 | 1,454 | 0 | 7,842 | 0.99% | 0 | 0 | 0 |
| Der Wandel | WANDL | 179 | 0 | 158 | 0 | 188 | 0 | 210 | 0 | 293 | 0 | 209 | 0 | 257 | 0 | 1,494 | 0.19% | 0 | 0 | 0 |
| Socialist Left Party | SLP | 130 | 0 | 110 | 0 | 84 | 0 | 138 | 0 | 142 | 0 | 176 | 0 | 167 | 0 | 947 | 0.12% | 0 | 0 | 0 |
| Valid Votes | | 72,067 | 1 | 77,073 | 0 | 70,814 | 0 | 154,385 | 3 | 122,257 | 1 | 148,002 | 3 | 150,584 | 3 | 795,182 | 100.00% | 11 | 17 | 28 |
| Rejected Votes | | 955 | | 928 | | 905 | | 2,519 | | 1,660 | | 2,328 | | 2,114 | | 11,515 (Note: Includes 106 unassigned rejected votes.) | 1.43% | | | |
| Total Polled | | 73,022 | | 78,001 | | 71,719 | | 156,904 | | 123,917 | | 150,330 | | 152,698 | | 806,697 | 69.73% | | | |
| Registered Electors | | 110,013 | | 110,576 | | 97,411 | | 224,396 | | 174,247 | | 228,791 | | 211,454 | | 1,156,888 | | | | |
| Turnout | | 66.38% | | 70.54% | | 73.63% | | 69.92% | | 71.12% | | 65.71% | | 72.21% | | 69.73% | | | | |

The following candidates were elected:

- State seats (party mandates) - Niko Alm (NEOS), 466 votes; Dagmar Belakowitsch-Jenewein (FPÖ), 214 votes; Eva Glawischnig-Piesczek (GRÜNE), 3,172 votes; Rudolf Hundstorfer (SPÖ), 1,860 votes; Brigitte Jank (ÖVP), 896 votes; Alev Korun (GRÜNE), 814 votes; Andrea Kuntzl (SPÖ), 183 votes; Jessi Lintl (FRANK), 135 votes; Daniela Musiol (GRÜNE), 306 votes; Andreas Ottenschläger (ÖVP), 323 votes; Michael Pock (NEOS), 163 votes; Thomas Schellenbacher (FPÖ), 32 votes; Andreas Schieder (SPÖ), 508 votes; Petra Steger (FPÖ), 167 votes; Albert Steinhauser (GRÜNE), 365 votes; Gabriele Tamandl (ÖVP), 267 votes; and Wolfgang Zinggl (GRÜNE), 240 votes. (Note: SPÖ: 2nd placed candidate Doris Bures was elected in Vienna South West.) (Note: ÖVP: 2nd placed candidate Sebastian Kurz was elected in Vienna South West.) (Note: FPÖ: 1st placed candidate Heinz-Christian Strache was elected on the federal list; 3rd placed candidate Heidemarie Unterreiner renounced her mandate; 4th placed candidate Johannes Hübner was elected in Vienna South West; 5th placed candidate Andreas Karlsböck was elected in Vienna South; 6th placed candidate Veronika Matiasek renounced her mandate; 7th placed candidate Hans-Jörg Jenewein renounced his mandate; and 8th placed candidate Eduard Schock renounced his mandate.) (Note: NEOS: 1st placed candidate Beate Meinl-Reisinger was elected on the federal list.)

Substitutions:

- Rudolf Hundstorfer (SPÖ) resigned on 16 December 2013 and was replaced by Kai Jan Krainer (SPÖ) on 17 December 2013.
- Daniela Musiol (GRÜNE) resigned on 27 April 2016 and was replaced by Karl Öllinger (GRÜNE) on 28 April 2016.
- Niko Alm (NEOS) resigned on 31 March 2017 and was replaced by Claudia Gamon (NEOS).
- Eva Glawischnig-Piesczek (GRÜNE) resigned on 23 May 2017 and was replaced by Barbara Neuroth (GRÜNE) on 29 May 2017.

==== 2000s ====
===== 2008 =====
Results of the 2008 legislative election held on 28 September 2008:

| Party | | Vienna Inner East | | Vienna Inner South | | Vienna Inner West | | Vienna North | | Vienna North West | | Vienna South | | Vienna South West | | Total votes | % | Seats | | |
| Party | | Votes | Seats | Votes | Seats | Votes | Seats | Votes | Seats | Votes | Seats | Votes | Seats | Votes | Seats | Total votes | % | Reg. | Stat. | Tot. |
|---|---|---|---|---|---|---|---|---|---|---|---|---|---|---|---|---|---|---|---|---|
| Social Democratic Party of Austria | SPÖ | 28,890 | 1 | 23,749 | 0 | 16,605 | 0 | 63,602 | 2 | 38,800 | 1 | 68,075 | 2 | 52,650 | 2 | 292,371 | 34.79% | 8 | 3 | 11 |
| Freedom Party of Austria | FPÖ | 15,788 | 0 | 12,225 | 0 | 7,540 | 0 | 40,807 | 1 | 21,586 | 0 | 43,987 | 1 | 29,725 | 1 | 171,658 | 20.43% | 3 | 3 | 6 |
| Austrian People's Party | ÖVP | 9,588 | 0 | 16,471 | 0 | 18,451 | 0 | 17,752 | 0 | 29,583 | 1 | 17,625 | 0 | 31,060 | 1 | 140,530 | 16.72% | 2 | 3 | 5 |
| The Greens – The Green Alternative | GRÜNE | 12,915 | 0 | 18,580 | 0 | 20,584 | 0 | 16,322 | 0 | 24,155 | 0 | 16,485 | 0 | 25,055 | 0 | 134,096 | 15.96% | 0 | 5 | 5 |
| Alliance for the Future of Austria | BZÖ | 3,415 | 0 | 3,357 | 0 | 2,913 | 0 | 9,024 | 0 | 5,714 | 0 | 7,624 | 0 | 7,816 | 0 | 39,863 | 4.74% | 0 | 1 | 1 |
| Liberal Forum | LiF | 3,128 | 0 | 4,560 | 0 | 5,398 | 0 | 4,406 | 0 | 6,347 | 0 | 4,330 | 0 | 6,711 | 0 | 34,880 | 4.15% | 0 | 0 | 0 |
| Communist Party of Austria | KPÖ | 1,035 | 0 | 1,186 | 0 | 1,050 | 0 | 1,458 | 0 | 1,322 | 0 | 1,497 | 0 | 1,509 | 0 | 9,057 | 1.08% | 0 | 0 | 0 |
| Fritz Dinkhauser List – Citizens' Forum Tyrol | FRITZ | 513 | 0 | 594 | 0 | 541 | 0 | 1,421 | 0 | 1,007 | 0 | 1,241 | 0 | 1,362 | 0 | 6,679 | 0.79% | 0 | 0 | 0 |
| Independent Citizens' Initiative Save Austria | RETTÖ | 417 | 0 | 437 | 0 | 385 | 0 | 1,132 | 0 | 763 | 0 | 920 | 0 | 999 | 0 | 5,053 | 0.60% | 0 | 0 | 0 |
| The Christians | DC | 240 | 0 | 297 | 0 | 300 | 0 | 454 | 0 | 470 | 0 | 441 | 0 | 653 | 0 | 2,855 | 0.34% | 0 | 0 | 0 |
| Animal Rights Party | TRP | 187 | 0 | 206 | 0 | 236 | 0 | 465 | 0 | 338 | 0 | 397 | 0 | 395 | 0 | 2,224 | 0.26% | 0 | 0 | 0 |
| Left | LINKE | 156 | 0 | 138 | 0 | 119 | 0 | 125 | 0 | 153 | 0 | 188 | 0 | 172 | 0 | 1,051 | 0.13% | 0 | 0 | 0 |
| Valid Votes | | 76,272 | 1 | 81,800 | 0 | 74,122 | 0 | 156,968 | 3 | 130,238 | 2 | 162,810 | 3 | 158,107 | 4 | 840,317 | 100.00% | 13 | 15 | 28 |
| Rejected Votes | | 1,139 | | 1,127 | | 948 | | 2,369 | | 1,834 | | 2,312 | | 2,374 | | 12,221 (Note: Includes 118 unassigned rejected votes.) | 1.43% | | | |
| Total Polled | | 77,411 | | 82,927 | | 75,070 | | 159,337 | | 132,072 | | 165,122 | | 160,481 | | 852,538 | 73.61% | | | |
| Registered Electors | | 110,370 | | 112,558 | | 100,304 | | 214,446 | | 176,915 | | 231,281 | | 212,248 | | 1,158,122 | | | | |
| Turnout | | 70.14% | | 73.67% | | 74.84% | | 74.30% | | 74.65% | | 71.39% | | 75.61% | | 73.61% | | | | |

The following candidates were elected:

- State seats (party mandates) - Dagmar Belakowitsch-Jenewein (FPÖ), 58 votes; Katharina Cortolezis-Schlager (ÖVP), 163 votes; Eva Glawischnig-Piesczek (GRÜNE), 2,596 votes; Johannes Hahn (ÖVP), 2,893 votes; Andreas Karlsböck (FPÖ), 14 votes; Wolfgang Katzian (SPÖ), 260 votes; Kai Jan Krainer (SPÖ), 218 votes; Andrea Kuntzl (SPÖ), 147 votes; Ulrike Lunacek (GRÜNE), 513 votes; Ferdinand Maier (ÖVP), 179 votes; Daniela Musiol (GRÜNE), 206 votes; Herbert Scheibner (BZÖ), 255 votes; Albert Steinhauser (GRÜNE), 144 votes; Heidemarie Unterreiner (FPÖ), 10 votes; and Wolfgang Zinggl (GRÜNE), 198 votes. (Note: SPÖ: 1st placed candidate Werner Faymann was elected on the federal list; 4th placed candidate Claudia Schmied renounced her mandate; 5th placed candidate Andreas Schieder was elected in Vienna South West; 6th placed candidate Laura Rudas was elected on the federal list; 7th placed candidate Christoph Matznetter was elected on the federal list; 8th placed candidate Renate Csörgits was elected on the federal list; 9th placed candidate Josef Cap was elected on the federal list; and 10th placed candidate Gertraud Knoll renounced her mandate.) (Note: FPÖ: 1st placed candidate Heinz-Christian Strache was elected on the federal list; 3rd placed candidate Martin Graf was elected in Vienna North; 4th placed candidate Peter Fichtenbauer was elected in Vienna South; and 5th placed candidate Johannes Hübner was elected in Vienna South West.) (Note: ÖVP: 2nd placed candidate Christine Marek was elected on the federal list.)

Substitutions:

- Johannes Hahn (ÖVP) resigned on 2 December 2008 and was replaced by Gabriele Tamandl (ÖVP) on 3 December 2008.
- Wolfgang Katzian (SPÖ) was reassigned to the Vienna South West seat vacated by Andreas Schieder and was replaced by Sabine Oberhauser (SPÖ) in Vienna on 3 December 2008.
- Ulrike Lunacek (GRÜNE) resigned on 9 July 2009 and was replaced by Karl Öllinger (GRÜNE) on 10 July 2009.
- Ferdinand Maier (ÖVP) resigned on 15 May 2012 and was replaced by Franz Windisch (ÖVP) on 16 May 2012.
- Andreas Karlsböck (FPÖ) was reassigned to the Vienna South seat vacated by Peter Fichtenbauer and was replaced by Hans-Jörg Jenewein (FPÖ) in Vienna on 21 July 2013.

===== 2006 =====
Results of the 2006 legislative election held on 1 October 2006:

| Party | | Vienna Inner East | | Vienna Inner South | | Vienna Inner West | | Vienna North | | Vienna North West | | Vienna South | | Vienna South West | | Total votes | % | Seats | | |
| Party | | Votes | Seats | Votes | Seats | Votes | Seats | Votes | Seats | Votes | Seats | Votes | Seats | Votes | Seats | Total votes | % | Reg. | Stat. | Tot. |
|---|---|---|---|---|---|---|---|---|---|---|---|---|---|---|---|---|---|---|---|---|
| Social Democratic Party of Austria | SPÖ | 33,420 | 1 | 28,003 | 1 | 20,135 | 0 | 71,261 | 2 | 44,267 | 1 | 75,656 | 3 | 59,086 | 2 | 331,828 | 41.04% | 10 | 3 | 13 |
| Austrian People's Party | ÖVP | 12,930 | 0 | 19,968 | 0 | 21,652 | 0 | 24,024 | 0 | 35,067 | 1 | 24,362 | 0 | 38,521 | 1 | 176,524 | 21.83% | 2 | 5 | 7 |
| The Greens – The Green Alternative | GRÜNE | 13,262 | 0 | 19,497 | 0 | 22,097 | 0 | 16,949 | 0 | 25,490 | 1 | 16,733 | 0 | 26,480 | 1 | 140,508 | 17.38% | 2 | 3 | 5 |
| Freedom Party of Austria | FPÖ | 10,559 | 0 | 8,599 | 0 | 5,472 | 0 | 24,229 | 0 | 14,984 | 0 | 28,569 | 1 | 19,686 | 0 | 112,098 | 13.86% | 1 | 3 | 4 |
| Hans-Peter Martin's List | MATIN | 1,655 | 0 | 1,454 | 0 | 1,187 | 0 | 4,159 | 0 | 2,442 | 0 | 3,481 | 0 | 3,410 | 0 | 17,788 | 2.20% | 0 | 0 | 0 |
| Alliance for the Future of Austria | BZÖ | 1,403 | 0 | 1,304 | 0 | 1,093 | 0 | 3,001 | 0 | 2,205 | 0 | 2,956 | 0 | 2,747 | 0 | 14,709 | 1.82% | 0 | 0 | 0 |
| Communist Party of Austria | KPÖ | 1,131 | 0 | 1,273 | 0 | 1,201 | 0 | 1,536 | 0 | 1,434 | 0 | 1,609 | 0 | 1,657 | 0 | 9,841 | 1.22% | 0 | 0 | 0 |
| EU Withdrawal – Neutral Free Austria | NFÖ | 281 | 0 | 261 | 0 | 197 | 0 | 663 | 0 | 390 | 0 | 660 | 0 | 566 | 0 | 3,018 | 0.37% | 0 | 0 | 0 |
| Socialist Left Party | SLP | 269 | 0 | 215 | 0 | 168 | 0 | 404 | 0 | 318 | 0 | 503 | 0 | 380 | 0 | 2,257 | 0.28% | 0 | 0 | 0 |
| Valid Votes | | 74,910 | 1 | 80,574 | 1 | 73,202 | 0 | 146,226 | 2 | 126,597 | 3 | 154,529 | 4 | 152,533 | 4 | 808,571 | 100.00% | 15 | 14 | 29 |
| Rejected Votes | | 852 | | 872 | | 690 | | 1,772 | | 1,360 | | 1,902 | | 1,773 | | 9,221 | 1.13% | | | |
| Total Polled | | 75,762 | | 81,446 | | 73,892 | | 147,998 | | 127,957 | | 156,431 | | 154,306 | | 817,792 | 72.35% | | | |
| Registered Electors | | 108,782 | | 111,576 | | 100,969 | | 204,900 | | 174,176 | | 222,935 | | 207,008 | | 1,130,346 | | | | |
| Turnout | | 69.65% | | 73.00% | | 73.18% | | 72.23% | | 73.46% | | 70.17% | | 74.54% | | 72.35% | | | | |

The following candidates were elected:

- State seats (party mandates) - Ulrike Baumgartner (ÖVP), 70 votes; Dagmar Belakowitsch (FPÖ), 27 votes; Gertrude Brinek (ÖVP), 141 votes; Josef Cap (SPÖ), 1,389 votes; Martin Graf (FPÖ), 59 votes; Elisabeth Hlavac (SPÖ), 76 votes; Andrea Kuntzl (SPÖ), 928 votes; Ulrike Lunacek (GRÜNE), 670 votes; Ferdinand Maier (ÖVP), 123 votes; Christine Marek (ÖVP), 90 votes; Franz Morak (ÖVP), 218 votes; Karl Öllinger (GRÜNE), 907 votes; Terezija Stoisits (GRÜNE), 64 votes; and Harald Vilimsky (FPÖ), 22 votes. (Note: ÖVP: 1st placed candidate Wolfgang Schüssel was elected on the federal list; and 2nd placed candidate Maria Rauch-Kallat was elected in Vienna North West.) (Note: Grüne: 1st placed candidate Eva Glawischnig was elected in Vienna South West.) (Note: FPÖ: 1st placed candidate Heinz-Christian Strache was elected on the federal list.)

Substitutions:

- Ulrike Baumgartner (ÖVP) resigned on 31 December 2006 and was replaced by Peter Michael Ikrath (ÖVP) on 2 January 2007.
- Christine Marek (ÖVP) resigned on 11 January 2007 and was replaced by Gabriele Tamandl (ÖVP) on 16 January 2007.
- Terezija Stoisits (GRÜNE) resigned on 30 June 2007 and was replaced by Albert Steinhauser (GRÜNE) on 2 July 2007.
- Gertrude Brinek (ÖVP) resigned on 11 July 2008 and was replaced by Alfred Finz (ÖVP) on 4 August 2008.

===== 2002 =====
Results of the 2002 legislative election held on 24 November 2002:

| Party | | Vienna Inner East | | Vienna Inner South | | Vienna Inner West | | Vienna North | | Vienna North West | | Vienna South | | Vienna South West | | Total votes | % | Seats | | |
| Party | | Votes | Seats | Votes | Seats | Votes | Seats | Votes | Seats | Votes | Seats | Votes | Seats | Votes | Seats | Total votes | % | Reg. | Stat. | Tot. |
|---|---|---|---|---|---|---|---|---|---|---|---|---|---|---|---|---|---|---|---|---|
| Social Democratic Party of Austria | SPÖ | 37,581 | 1 | 31,048 | 1 | 23,493 | 0 | 79,678 | 3 | 50,024 | 1 | 85,866 | 3 | 65,746 | 2 | 373,436 | 43.77% | 11 | 3 | 14 |
| Austrian People's Party | ÖVP | 20,774 | 0 | 27,496 | 1 | 30,175 | 1 | 39,904 | 1 | 47,746 | 1 | 41,245 | 1 | 54,156 | 2 | 261,496 | 30.65% | 7 | 3 | 10 |
| The Greens – The Green Alternative | GRÜNE | 12,174 | 0 | 17,804 | 0 | 21,651 | 0 | 15,690 | 0 | 22,234 | 0 | 16,265 | 0 | 23,323 | 0 | 129,141 | 15.14% | 0 | 4 | 4 |
| Freedom Party of Austria | FPÖ | 7,019 | 0 | 6,297 | 0 | 5,093 | 0 | 12,281 | 0 | 10,303 | 0 | 14,659 | 0 | 12,323 | 0 | 67,975 | 7.97% | 0 | 2 | 2 |
| Liberal Forum | LiF | 905 | 0 | 1,034 | 0 | 954 | 0 | 2,069 | 0 | 1,468 | 0 | 1,833 | 0 | 1,798 | 0 | 10,061 | 1.18% | 0 | 0 | 0 |
| Communist Party of Austria | KPÖ | 623 | 0 | 551 | 0 | 423 | 0 | 969 | 0 | 652 | 0 | 1,134 | 0 | 845 | 0 | 5,197 | 0.61% | 0 | 0 | 0 |
| Socialist Left Party | SLP | 397 | 0 | 376 | 0 | 199 | 0 | 786 | 0 | 549 | 0 | 920 | 0 | 679 | 0 | 3,906 | 0.46% | 0 | 0 | 0 |
| The Democrats | | 197 | 0 | 200 | 0 | 139 | 0 | 412 | 0 | 264 | 0 | 454 | 0 | 364 | 0 | 2,030 | 0.24% | 0 | 0 | 0 |
| Valid Votes | | 79,670 | 1 | 84,806 | 2 | 82,127 | 1 | 151,789 | 4 | 133,240 | 2 | 162,376 | 4 | 159,234 | 4 | 853,242 | 100.00% | 18 | 12 | 30 |
| Rejected Votes | | 827 | | 763 | | 545 | | 1,695 | | 1,210 | | 1,784 | | 1,572 | | 8,396 | 0.97% | | | |
| Total Polled | | 80,497 | | 85,569 | | 82,672 | | 153,484 | | 134,450 | | 164,160 | | 160,806 | | 861,638 | 77.60% | | | |
| Registered Electors | | 106,381 | | 109,739 | | 111,998 | | 196,491 | | 168,401 | | 216,293 | | 201,018 | | 1,110,321 | | | | |
| Turnout | | 75.67% | | 77.98% | | 73.82% | | 78.11% | | 79.84% | | 75.90% | | 80.00% | | 77.60% | | | | |

The following candidates were elected:

- State seats (party mandates) - Ulrike Baumgartner-Gabitzer (ÖVP), 32 votes; Gertrude Brinek (ÖVP), 124 votes; Heinz Fischer (SPÖ), 694 votes; Eva Glawischnig (GRÜNE), 2,958 votes; Andrea Kuntzl (SPÖ), 315 votes; Karl Öllinger (GRÜNE), 741 votes; Helene Partik-Pablé (FPÖ), 210 votes; Herbert Scheibner (FPÖ), 734 votes; Ulli Sima (SPÖ), 340 votes; Terezija Stoisits (GRÜNE), 620 votes; Walter Tancsits (ÖVP), 66 votes; and Alexander Van der Bellen (GRÜNE), 10,135 votes. (Note: SPÖ: 1st placed candidate Wolfgang Petritsch renounced his mandate.) (Note: ÖVP: 1st placed candidate Wolfgang Schüssel was elected on the federal list; 2nd placed candidate Alfred Finz was elected in Vienna Inner South; 3rd placed candidate Maria Rauch-Kallat was elected in Vienna North West; and 4th placed candidate Franz Morak was elected in Vienna Inner West.)

Substitutions:

- Ulrike Baumgartner-Gabitzer (ÖVP) was reassigned to the Vienna Inner South seat vacated by Alfred Finz and was replaced by Christine Marek (ÖVP) in Vienna on 5 March 2003.
- Walter Tancsits (ÖVP) was reassigned to the Vienna North West seat vacated by Maria Rauch-Kallat and was replaced by Peter Michael Ikrath (ÖVP) in Vienna on 5 March 2003.
- Heinz Fischer (SPÖ) resigned on 16 June 2004 and was replaced by Caspar Einem (SPÖ).
- Ulli Sima (SPÖ) resigned on 1 July 2004 and was replaced by Elisabeth Hlavac (SPÖ) on 1 July 2004.

==== 1990s ====
===== 1999 =====
Results of the 1999 legislative election held on 3 October 1999:

| Party | | Vienna Inner East | | Vienna Inner South | | Vienna Inner West | | Vienna North | | Vienna North West | | Vienna South | | Vienna South West | | Total votes | % | Seats | | |
| Party | | Votes | Seats | Votes | Seats | Votes | Seats | Votes | Seats | Votes | Seats | Votes | Seats | Votes | Seats | Total votes | % | Reg. | Stat. | Tot. |
|---|---|---|---|---|---|---|---|---|---|---|---|---|---|---|---|---|---|---|---|---|
| Social Democratic Party of Austria | SPÖ | 30,513 | 1 | 25,526 | 1 | 19,668 | 0 | 63,007 | 2 | 41,502 | 1 | 69,917 | 2 | 55,092 | 2 | 305,225 | 37.85% | 9 | 3 | 12 |
| Freedom Party of Austria | FPÖ | 20,030 | 0 | 18,108 | 0 | 14,485 | 0 | 38,253 | 1 | 29,551 | 1 | 43,190 | 1 | 36,141 | 1 | 199,758 | 24.77% | 4 | 4 | 8 |
| Austrian People's Party | ÖVP | 9,746 | 0 | 15,792 | 0 | 18,736 | 0 | 17,268 | 0 | 27,776 | 1 | 18,348 | 0 | 29,300 | 1 | 136,966 | 16.99% | 2 | 3 | 5 |
| The Greens – The Green Alternative | GRÜNE | 7,592 | 0 | 11,045 | 0 | 12,712 | 0 | 11,181 | 0 | 14,159 | 0 | 11,157 | 0 | 15,428 | 0 | 83,274 | 10.33% | 0 | 3 | 3 |
| Liberal Forum | LiF | 4,619 | 0 | 7,297 | 0 | 9,665 | 0 | 7,083 | 0 | 9,901 | 0 | 7,162 | 0 | 10,404 | 0 | 56,131 | 6.96% | 0 | 0 | 0 |
| The Independents | DU | 1,259 | 0 | 1,133 | 0 | 1,046 | 0 | 2,703 | 0 | 2,115 | 0 | 2,811 | 0 | 2,618 | 0 | 13,685 | 1.70% | 0 | 0 | 0 |
| Communist Party of Austria | KPÖ | 897 | 0 | 786 | 0 | 730 | 0 | 1,184 | 0 | 929 | 0 | 1,432 | 0 | 1,123 | 0 | 7,081 | 0.88% | 0 | 0 | 0 |
| No to NATO and EU – Neutral Austria Citizens' Initiative | NEIN | 412 | 0 | 447 | 0 | 316 | 0 | 798 | 0 | 671 | 0 | 814 | 0 | 795 | 0 | 4,253 | 0.53% | 0 | 0 | 0 |
| Valid Votes | | 75,068 | 1 | 80,134 | 1 | 77,358 | 0 | 141,477 | 3 | 126,604 | 3 | 154,831 | 3 | 150,901 | 4 | 806,373 | 100.00% | 15 | 13 | 28 |
| Rejected Votes | | 1,078 | | 934 | | 695 | | 2,239 | | 1,372 | | 2,225 | | 2,028 | | 10,571 | 1.29% | | | |
| Total Polled | | 76,146 | | 81,068 | | 78,053 | | 143,716 | | 127,976 | | 157,056 | | 152,929 | | 816,944 | 73.70% | | | |
| Registered Electors | | 105,340 | | 110,139 | | 114,862 | | 192,452 | | 168,497 | | 215,435 | | 201,722 | | 1,108,447 | | | | |
| Turnout | | 72.29% | | 73.61% | | 67.95% | | 74.68% | | 75.95% | | 72.90% | | 75.81% | | 73.70% | | | | |

The following candidates were elected:

- State seats (party mandates) - Gerhard Bauer (FPÖ), 15 votes; Gertrude Brinek (ÖVP), 132 votes; Rudolf Edlinger (SPÖ), 1,166 votes; Robert Egghart (FPÖ), 21 votes; Caspar Einem (SPÖ), 2,544 votes; Eva Glawischnig (GRÜNE), 544 votes; Wolfgang Jung (FPÖ), 14 votes; Detlev Neudeck (FPÖ), 46 votes; Karl Öllinger (GRÜNE), 135 votes; Elisabeth Pittermann (SPÖ), 436 votes; Erwin Rasinger (ÖVP), 173 votes; Terezija Stoisits (GRÜNE), 391 votes; and Walter Tancsits (ÖVP), 95 votes. (Note: SPÖ: 1st placed candidate Eleonora Hostasch was elected on the federal list; and 2nd placed candidate Heinz Fischer was elected on the federal list.) (Note: FPÖ: 1st placed candidate Herbert Scheibner was elected in Vienna South West; 2nd placed candidate Peter Westenthaler was elected in Vienna South; 3rd placed candidate Helene Partik-Pablé was elected in Vienna North West; and 4th placed candidate Martin Graf was elected in Vienna North.) (Note: ÖVP: 1st placed candidate Wolfgang Schüssel was elected in Vienna South West.)

Substitutions:

- Wolfgang Jung (FPÖ) was reassigned to the Vienna South West seat vacated by Herbert Scheibner and was replaced by Ilse Burket (FPÖ) in Vienna on 17 February 2000.
- Elisabeth Pittermann (SPÖ) resigned on 13 December 2000 and was replaced by Elisabeth Hlavac (SPÖ) on 14 December 2000.

===== 1995 =====
Results of the 1995 legislative election held on 17 December 1995:

| Party | | Vienna Inner East | | Vienna Inner South | | Vienna Inner West | | Vienna North | | Vienna North West | | Vienna South | | Vienna South West | | Total votes | % | Seats | | |
| Party | | Votes | Seats | Votes | Seats | Votes | Seats | Votes | Seats | Votes | Seats | Votes | Seats | Votes | Seats | Total votes | % | Reg. | Stat. | Tot. |
|---|---|---|---|---|---|---|---|---|---|---|---|---|---|---|---|---|---|---|---|---|
| Social Democratic Party of Austria | SPÖ | 39,033 | 1 | 33,990 | 1 | 28,178 | 1 | 73,478 | 2 | 53,735 | 2 | 86,395 | 3 | 69,182 | 2 | 383,991 | 43.98% | 12 | 2 | 14 |
| Freedom Party of Austria | FPÖ | 18,291 | 0 | 17,015 | 0 | 13,727 | 0 | 30,209 | 1 | 26,898 | 1 | 36,957 | 1 | 32,120 | 1 | 175,217 | 20.07% | 4 | 2 | 6 |
| Austrian People's Party | ÖVP | 12,332 | 0 | 19,857 | 0 | 23,663 | 0 | 20,165 | 0 | 34,874 | 1 | 23,047 | 0 | 36,721 | 1 | 170,659 | 19.55% | 2 | 4 | 6 |
| Liberal Forum | LiF | 5,933 | 0 | 8,331 | 0 | 9,888 | 0 | 11,350 | 0 | 12,955 | 0 | 11,908 | 0 | 14,984 | 0 | 75,349 | 8.63% | 0 | 2 | 2 |
| The Greens – The Green Alternative | GRÜNE | 4,765 | 0 | 6,972 | 0 | 8,111 | 0 | 6,733 | 0 | 8,933 | 0 | 7,463 | 0 | 9,787 | 0 | 52,764 | 6.04% | 0 | 2 | 2 |
| No to NATO and EU – Neutral Austria Citizens' Initiative | NEIN | 994 | 0 | 960 | 0 | 760 | 0 | 1,810 | 0 | 1,467 | 0 | 2,114 | 0 | 1,889 | 0 | 9,994 | 1.14% | 0 | 0 | 0 |
| Communist Party of Austria | KPÖ | 409 | 0 | 345 | 0 | 256 | 0 | 667 | 0 | 434 | 0 | 760 | 0 | 550 | 0 | 3,421 | 0.39% | 0 | 0 | 0 |
| Natural Law Party | ÖNP | 164 | 0 | 122 | 0 | 143 | 0 | 251 | 0 | 257 | 0 | 374 | 0 | 323 | 0 | 1,634 | 0.19% | 0 | 0 | 0 |
| Valid Votes | | 81,921 | 1 | 87,592 | 1 | 84,726 | 1 | 144,663 | 3 | 139,553 | 4 | 169,018 | 4 | 165,556 | 4 | 873,029 | 100.00% | 18 | 12 | 30 |
| Rejected Votes | | 1,219 | | 1,160 | | 841 | | 2,403 | | 1,832 | | 2,907 | | 2,498 | | 12,860 | 1.45% | | | |
| Total Polled | | 83,140 | | 88,752 | | 85,567 | | 147,066 | | 141,385 | | 171,925 | | 168,054 | | 885,889 | 79.32% | | | |
| Registered Electors | | 106,763 | | 112,943 | | 114,958 | | 182,968 | | 175,198 | | 216,865 | | 207,183 | | 1,116,878 | | | | |
| Turnout | | 77.87% | | 78.58% | | 74.43% | | 80.38% | | 80.70% | | 79.28% | | 81.11% | | 79.32% | | | | |

The following candidates were elected:

- State seats (party mandates) - Volker Kier (LiF), 247 votes; Friedrich König (ÖVP), 82 votes; Franz Löschnak (SPÖ), 206 votes; Karl Öllinger (GRÜNE), 154 votes; Madeleine Petrovic (GRÜNE), 1,871 votes; Susanne Preisinger (FPÖ), 23 votes; Erwin Rasinger (ÖVP), 346 votes; Maria Rauch (ÖVP), 201 votes; Heide Schmidt (LiF), 3,457 votes; Hans Schöll (FPÖ), 41 votes; Walter Schwimmer (ÖVP), 80 votes; and Franz Vranitzky (SPÖ), 15,628 votes. (Note: SPÖ: 2nd placed candidate Brigitte Ederer was elected in Vienna Inner East; 3rd placed candidate Heinz Fischer was elected on the federal list; and 4th placed candidate Eleonora Hostasch was elected on the federal list.) (Note: FPÖ: 1st placed candidate Helene Partik-Pablé was elected in Vienna North West; 2nd placed candidate Holger Bauer was elected in Vienna South; 3rd placed candidate Herbert Scheibner was elected in Vienna South West; and 5th placed candidate Martin Graf was elected in Vienna North.) (Note: ÖVP: 1st placed candidate Wolfgang Schüssel was elected on the federal list; 3rd placed candidate Heinrich Neisser was elected in Vienna North West; and 6th placed candidate Ingrid Tichy-Schreder was elected in Vienna South West.)

Substitutions:

- Friedrich König (ÖVP) resigned on 15 January 1996 and was replaced by Fritz Neugebauer (ÖVP) on 15 January 1996.
- Franz Vranitzky (SPÖ) resigned on 13 March 1996 and was replaced by Elisabeth Pittermann (SPÖ) on 14 March 1996.
- Fritz Neugebauer (ÖVP) resigned on 1 October 1996 and was replaced by Friedrich König (ÖVP) on 2 October 1996.
- Hans Schöll (FPÖ) resigned on 11 November 1996 and was replaced by Wolfgang Jung (FPÖ) on 12 November 1996.
- Walter Schwimmer (ÖVP) resigned on 31 August 1999 and was replaced by Fritz Neugebauer (ÖVP) on 2 September 1999.

===== 1994 =====
Results of the 1994 legislative election held on 9 October 1994:

| Party | | Vienna Inner East | | Vienna Inner South | | Vienna Inner West | | Vienna North | | Vienna North West | | Vienna South | | Vienna South West | | Total votes | % | Seats | | |
| Party | | Votes | Seats | Votes | Seats | Votes | Seats | Votes | Seats | Votes | Seats | Votes | Seats | Votes | Seats | Total votes | % | Reg. | Stat. | Tot. |
|---|---|---|---|---|---|---|---|---|---|---|---|---|---|---|---|---|---|---|---|---|
| Social Democratic Party of Austria | SPÖ | 32,284 | 1 | 27,135 | 1 | 20,669 | 0 | 58,837 | 2 | 44,578 | 1 | 72,338 | 3 | 57,837 | 2 | 313,678 | 38.48% | 10 | 3 | 13 |
| Freedom Party of Austria | FPÖ | 19,555 | 0 | 18,198 | 0 | 14,660 | 0 | 29,832 | 1 | 29,643 | 1 | 38,797 | 1 | 34,521 | 1 | 185,206 | 22.72% | 4 | 3 | 7 |
| Austrian People's Party | ÖVP | 10,324 | 0 | 16,756 | 0 | 19,595 | 0 | 16,027 | 0 | 28,388 | 1 | 19,266 | 0 | 29,332 | 1 | 139,688 | 17.14% | 2 | 3 | 5 |
| Liberal Forum | LiF | 6,595 | 0 | 8,884 | 0 | 10,147 | 0 | 11,997 | 0 | 14,603 | 0 | 13,049 | 0 | 16,869 | 0 | 82,144 | 10.08% | 0 | 3 | 3 |
| The Greens – The Green Alternative | GRÜNE | 6,891 | 0 | 9,842 | 0 | 11,542 | 0 | 10,490 | 0 | 13,911 | 0 | 11,628 | 0 | 15,239 | 0 | 79,543 | 9.76% | 0 | 3 | 3 |
| No – Civic Action Group; Against the Sale of Austria | NEIN | 814 | 0 | 829 | 0 | 680 | 0 | 1,429 | 0 | 1,286 | 0 | 1,779 | 0 | 1,672 | 0 | 8,489 | 1.04% | 0 | 0 | 0 |
| Communist Party of Austria | KPÖ | 443 | 0 | 366 | 0 | 290 | 0 | 677 | 0 | 453 | 0 | 723 | 0 | 585 | 0 | 3,537 | 0.43% | 0 | 0 | 0 |
| Natural Law Party | ÖNP | 142 | 0 | 128 | 0 | 141 | 0 | 215 | 0 | 256 | 0 | 280 | 0 | 264 | 0 | 1,426 | 0.17% | 0 | 0 | 0 |
| Citizen Greens Austria – Free Democrats | BGÖ | 56 | 0 | 69 | 0 | 97 | 0 | 134 | 0 | 122 | 0 | 121 | 0 | 147 | 0 | 746 | 0.09% | 0 | 0 | 0 |
| United Greens Austria – List Adi Pinter | VGÖ | 59 | 0 | 63 | 0 | 59 | 0 | 88 | 0 | 121 | 0 | 135 | 0 | 142 | 0 | 667 | 0.08% | 0 | 0 | 0 |
| Valid Votes | | 77,163 | 1 | 82,270 | 1 | 77,880 | 0 | 129,726 | 3 | 133,361 | 3 | 158,116 | 4 | 156,608 | 4 | 815,124 | 100.00% | 16 | 15 | 31 |
| Rejected Votes | | 992 | | 886 | | 716 | | 1,851 | | 1,525 | | 2,074 | | 2,339 | | 10,383 | 1.26% | | | |
| Total Polled | | 78,155 | | 83,156 | | 78,596 | | 131,577 | | 134,886 | | 160,190 | | 158,947 | | 825,507 | 73.19% | | | |
| Registered Electors | | 109,060 | | 114,765 | | 114,539 | | 179,852 | | 179,058 | | 219,852 | | 210,726 | | 1,127,852 | | | | |
| Turnout | | 71.66% | | 72.46% | | 68.62% | | 73.16% | | 75.33% | | 72.86% | | 75.43% | | 73.19% | | | | |

The following candidates were elected:

- State seats (personal mandates) - Franz Vranitzky (SPÖ), 57,901 votes.
- State seats (party mandates) - Erhard Busek (ÖVP), 19,828 votes; Johanna Dohnal (SPÖ), 874 votes; Martina Gredler (LiF), 184 votes; John Gudenus (FPÖ), 361 votes; Volker Kier (LiF), 155 votes; Ingrid Korosec (ÖVP), 193 votes; Franz Löschnak (SPÖ), 1,043 votes; Karl Öllinger (GRÜNE), 170 votes; Madeleine Petrovic (GRÜNE), 13,313 votes; Susanne Preisinger (FPÖ), 32 votes; Heide Schmidt (LiF), 12,178 votes; Hans Schöll (FPÖ), 75 votes; Walter Schwimmer (ÖVP), 326 votes; and Terezija Stoisits (GRÜNE), 1,004 votes. (Note: SPÖ: 3rd placed candidate Heinz Fischer was elected on the federal list.) (Note: FPÖ: 1st placed candidate Helene Partik-Pablé was elected in Vienna North West; 2nd placed candidate Holger Bauer was elected in Vienna South; 3rd placed candidate Herbert Scheibner was elected in Vienna South West; and 6th placed candidate Martin Graf was elected in Vienna North.)

Substitutions:

- Erhard Busek (ÖVP) resigned on 13 December 1994 and was replaced by Friedrich König (ÖVP) on 15 December 1994.
- Johanna Dohnal (SPÖ) resigned on 14 December 1994 and was replaced by Irmtraut Karlsson (SPÖ) on 15 December 1994.
- Franz Löschnak (SPÖ) resigned on 14 December 1994 and was replaced by Elisabeth Pittermann (SPÖ) on 15 December 1994.
- Franz Vranitzky (SPÖ) resigned on 14 December 1994 and was replaced by Josef Edler (SPÖ) on 15 December 1994.
- Martina Gredler (LiF) resigned on 20 January 1995 and was replaced by Brigitte Peschel (LiF) on 23 January 1995.
- Friedrich König (ÖVP) resigned on 12 March 1995 and was replaced by Michael Graff (ÖVP) on 15 March 1995.
- Josef Edler (SPÖ) resigned on 19 April 1995 and was replaced by Elisabeth Pittermann (SPÖ) who was herself replaced by Franz Löschnak (SPÖ) on 26 April 1995.
- Michael Graff (ÖVP) resigned on 7 May 1995 and was replaced by Erhard Busek (ÖVP) on 8 May 1995.
- Ingrid Korosec (ÖVP) resigned on 30 June 1995 and was replaced by Friedrich König (ÖVP) on 4 July 1995.
- Erhard Busek (ÖVP) resigned on 24 July 1995 and was replaced by Michael Graff (ÖVP) on 31 July 1995.
- Friedrich König (ÖVP) resigned on 31 July 1995 and was replaced by Maria Rauch-Kallat (ÖVP) on 8 August 1995.
- John Gudenus (FPÖ) resigned on 10 November 1995 and was replaced by Wolfgang Jung (FPÖ) on 13 November 1995.

===== 1990 =====
Results of the 1990 legislative election held on 7 October 1990:

| Party | | Votes | % | Seats |
|---|---|---|---|---|
| Socialist Party of Austria | SPÖ | 416,022 | 50.70% | 18 |
| Austrian People's Party | ÖVP | 173,086 | 21.09% | 7 |
| Freedom Party of Austria | FPÖ | 129,062 | 15.73% | 5 |
| The Green Alternative | GRÜNE | 62,560 | 7.62% | 2 |
| United Greens of Austria | VGÖ | 17,790 | 2.17% | 0 |
| Alliance of Welfare Beneficiaries | VDS | 12,242 | 1.49% | 0 |
| Communist Party of Austria | KPÖ | 6,777 | 0.83% | 0 |
| Christian Democratic Party | CDP | 3,041 | 0.37% | 0 |
| Valid Votes | | 820,580 | 100.00% | 32 |
| Rejected Votes | | 17,037 | 2.03% | |
| Total Polled | | 837,617 | 73.98% | |
| Registered Electors | | 1,132,198 | | |

The following candidates were elected:

- Party mandates - Holger Bauer (FPÖ), 82 votes; Doris Bures (SPÖ), 29 votes; Erhard Busek (ÖVP), 4,105 votes; Josef Cap (SPÖ), 208 votes; Karl Dittrich (ÖVP), 25 votes; Kurt Eder (SPÖ), 36 votes; Brigitte Ederer (SPÖ), 114 votes; Heinz Fischer (SPÖ), 113 votes; Marilies Flemming (ÖVP), 831 votes; Anton Gaál (SPÖ), 58 votes; Kurt Heindl (SPÖ), 8 votes; Elisabeth Hlavac (SPÖ), 11 votes; Eleonora Hostasch (SPÖ), 11 votes; Friedrich König (ÖVP), 73 votes; Hans Matzenauer (SPÖ), 12 votes; Georg Mautner Markhof (FPÖ), 112 votes; Franz Mrkvicka (SPÖ), 22 votes; Ernst Nedwed (SPÖ), 40 votes; Heinrich Neisser (ÖVP), 278 votes; Rudolf Nürnberger (SPÖ), 21 votes; Helene Partik-Pablé (FPÖ), 895 votes; Rainer Pawkowicz (FPÖ), 149 votes; Madeleine Petrovic (GRÜNE), 511 votes; Peter Schieder (SPÖ), 10 votes; Heide Schmidt (FPÖ), 3,351 votes; Herbert Schmidtmeier (SPÖ), 12 votes; Edgar Schranz (SPÖ), 18 votes; Wolfgang Schüssel (ÖVP), 1,917 votes; Walter Schwimmer (ÖVP), 84 votes; Manfred Srb (GRÜNE), 42 votes; Fritz Svihalek (SPÖ), 217 votes; and Gabrielle Traxler (SPÖ), 66 votes.

Substitutions:

- Marilies Flemming (ÖVP) resigned on 16 November 1990 and was replaced by Ingrid Tichy-Schreder (ÖVP) on 22 November 1990.
- Erhard Busek (ÖVP) resigned on 17 December 1990 and was replaced by Ingrid Korosec (ÖVP) on 18 December 1990.
- Wolfgang Schüssel (ÖVP) resigned on 17 December 1990 and was replaced by Josef Arthold (ÖVP) on 18 December 1990.
- Rainer Pawkowicz (FPÖ) resigned on 8 December 1991 and was replaced by Hans Schöll (FPÖ) on 9 December 1991.
- Ernst Nedwed (SPÖ) resigned on 28 January 1992 and was replaced by Ernst Steinbach (SPÖ) on 29 January 1992.
- Brigitte Ederer (SPÖ) resigned on 3 April 1992 and was replaced by Peter Jankowitsch (SPÖ) on 8 April 1992.
- Georg Mautner Markhof (FPÖ) resigned on 6 April 1992 and was replaced by John Gudenus (FPÖ) on 9 April 1992.
- Karl Dittrich (ÖVP) resigned on 30 April 1992 and was replaced by Helmut Klomfar (ÖVP) on 6 May 1992.
- Hans Matzenauer (SPÖ) resigned on 31 October 1992 and was replaced by Josef Edler (SPÖ) on 6 November 1992.
- Peter Jankowitsch (SPÖ) resigned on 18 October 1993 and was replaced by Irmtraut Karlsson (SPÖ) on 19 October 1993.
- Manfred Srb (GRÜNE) resigned on 3 May 1994 and was replaced by Sonja Puntscher Riekmann (GRÜNE) on 20 May 1994.

==== 1980s ====
===== 1986 =====
Results of the 1986 legislative election held on 23 November 1986:

| Party | | Votes | % | Seats |
|---|---|---|---|---|
| Socialist Party of Austria | SPÖ | 477,557 | 52.35% | 18 |
| Austrian People's Party | ÖVP | 303,109 | 33.23% | 11 |
| The Green Alternative - Freda Meissner-Blau List | GRÜNE | 55,571 | 6.09% | 2 |
| Freedom Party of Austria | FPÖ | 52,525 | 5.76% | 2 |
| Communist Party of Austria | KPÖ | 9,345 | 1.02% | 0 |
| Action List - I've Had Enough | MIR | 8,100 | 0.89% | 0 |
| Green Alternatives – Democratic List | GAL | 6,005 | 0.66% | 0 |
| Valid Votes | | 912,212 | 100.00% | 33 |
| Rejected Votes | | 9,767 | 1.06% | |
| Total Polled | | 921,979 | 81.50% | |
| Registered Electors | | 1,131,318 | | |

The following candidates were elected: Holger Bauer (FPÖ); Josef Cap (SPÖ); Adolf Czettel (SPÖ); Karl Dittrich (ÖVP); Brigitte Ederer (SPÖ); Michael Graff (ÖVP); Hilde Hawlicek (SPÖ); Kurt Heindl (SPÖ); Hans Hobl (SPÖ); Marga Hubinek (ÖVP); Herbert Kohlmaier (ÖVP); Friedrich König (ÖVP); Hans Ludwig (SPÖ); Hans Matzenauer (SPÖ); Ernst Nedwed (SPÖ); Heinrich Neisser (ÖVP); Rudolf Nürnberger (SPÖ); Helene Partik-Pablé (FPÖ); Peter Pilz (GRÜNE); Rudolf Pöder (SPÖ); Josef Rieder (SPÖ); Rudolf Sallinger (ÖVP); Stefan Schemer (SPÖ); Peter Schieder (SPÖ); Herbert Schmidtmeier (SPÖ); Johann Schmölz (SPÖ); Edgar Schranz (SPÖ); Wolfgang Schüssel (ÖVP); Walter Schwimmer (ÖVP); Manfred Srb (GRÜNE); Heribert Steinbauer (ÖVP); Ingrid Tichy-Schreder (ÖVP); and Gabrielle Traxler (SPÖ).

Substitutions:

- Hilde Hawlicek (SPÖ) resigned on 22 January 1987 and was replaced by Heinz Fischer (SPÖ) on 27 January 1987.
- Heinrich Neisser (ÖVP) resigned on 28 January 1987 and was replaced by Oskar Mayer (ÖVP) on 29 January 1987.
- Hans Hobl (SPÖ) resigned on 15 November 1987 and was replaced by Franz Mrkvicka (SPÖ) on 24 November 1987.
- Adolf Czettel (SPÖ) resigned on 20 November 1987 and was replaced by Kurt Eder (SPÖ) on 24 November 1987.
- Herbert Kohlmaier (ÖVP) resigned on 23 March 1988 and was replaced by Heinrich Schmelz (ÖVP) on 15 April 1988.
- Heinrich Schmelz (ÖVP) resigned on 10 May 1988 and was replaced by Gertrude Brinek (ÖVP) on 19 May 1988.
- Johann Schmölz (SPÖ) resigned on 26 September 1989 and was replaced by Eleonora Hostasch (SPÖ) on 27 September 1989.
- Josef Rieder (SPÖ) resigned on 14 December 1989 and was replaced by Elisabeth Hlavac (SPÖ) on 15 December 1989.

===== 1983 =====
Results of the 1983 legislative election held on 24 April 1983:

| Party | | Votes | % | Seats |
|---|---|---|---|---|
| Socialist Party of Austria | SPÖ | 554,663 | 56.57% | 20 |
| Austrian People's Party | ÖVP | 329,883 | 33.64% | 12 |
| Freedom Party of Austria | FPÖ | 42,948 | 4.38% | 1 |
| United Greens of Austria | VGÖ | 22,374 | 2.28% | 0 |
| Alternative List Austria | ALÖ | 13,696 | 1.40% | 0 |
| Communist Party of Austria | KPÖ | 9,620 | 0.98% | 0 |
| Stop Immigrants Movement | AUS | 3,914 | 0.40% | 0 |
| Austria Party | ÖP | 3,437 | 0.35% | 0 |
| Valid Votes | | 980,535 | 100.00% | 33 |
| Rejected Votes | | 13,255 | 1.33% | |
| Total Polled | | 993,790 | 87.02% | |
| Registered Electors | | 1,141,971 | | |

The following candidates were elected: Anton Benya (SPÖ); Kurt Bergmann (ÖVP); Helmut Braun (SPÖ); Josef Cap (SPÖ); Adolf Czettel (SPÖ); Alfred Dallinger (SPÖ); Karl Dittrich (ÖVP); Heinz Fischer (SPÖ); Michael Graff (ÖVP); Hilde Hawlicek (SPÖ); Kurt Heindl (SPÖ); Hans Hobl (SPÖ); Marga Hubinek (ÖVP); Herbert Kohlmaier (ÖVP); Friedrich König (ÖVP); Erwin Lanc (SPÖ); Karl Lausecker (SPÖ); Franz Löschnak (SPÖ); Kurt Mühlbacher (SPÖ); Ernst Nedwed (SPÖ); Heinrich Neisser (ÖVP); Rudolf Sallinger (ÖVP); Stefan Schemer (SPÖ); Edgar Schranz (SPÖ); Wolfgang Schüssel (ÖVP); Walter Schwimmer (ÖVP); Karl Sekanina (SPÖ); Ingrid Smejkal (SPÖ); Norbert Steger (FPÖ); Heribert Steinbauer (ÖVP); Kurt Steyrer (SPÖ); Ingrid Tichy-Schreder (ÖVP); and Ernst Eugen Veselsky (SPÖ).

Substitutions:

- Alfred Dallinger (SPÖ) resigned on 31 May 1983 and was replaced by Gabrielle Traxler (SPÖ) on 1 June 1983.
- Heinz Fischer (SPÖ) resigned on 31 May 1983 and was replaced by Albrecht Konecny (SPÖ) on 1 June 1983.
- Erwin Lanc (SPÖ) resigned on 31 May 1983 and was replaced by Franziska Fast (SPÖ) on 1 June 1983.
- Karl Lausecker (SPÖ) resigned on 31 May 1983 and was replaced by Josef Veleta (SPÖ) on 1 June 1983.
- Franz Löschnak (SPÖ) resigned on 31 May 1983 and was replaced by Josef Rieder (SPÖ) on 1 June 1983.
- Karl Sekanina (SPÖ) resigned on 31 May 1983 and was replaced by Rudolf Pöder (SPÖ) on 1 June 1983.
- Kurt Steyrer (SPÖ) resigned on 31 May 1983 and was replaced by Peter Jankowitsch (SPÖ) on 1 June 1983.
- Franziska Fast (SPÖ) resigned on 30 June 1983 and was replaced by Brigitte Ederer (SPÖ) on 1 July 1983.
- Adolf Czettel (SPÖ) resigned on 26 June 1984 and was replaced by Rudolf Nürnberger (SPÖ) on 27 June 1984.
- Helmut Braun (SPÖ) resigned on 6 September 1984 and was replaced by Erika Krenn (SPÖ) on 7 September 1984.
- Ingrid Smejkal (SPÖ) resigned on 6 September 1984 and was replaced by Peter Schieder (SPÖ) on 7 September 1984.
- Erika Krenn (SPÖ) resigned on 11 September 1984 and was replaced by Hans Ludwig (SPÖ) on 13 September 1984.
- Josef Veleta (SPÖ) resigned on 30 March 1986 and was replaced by Johann Schmölz (SPÖ) on 31 March 1986.
- Peter Jankowitsch (SPÖ) resigned on 17 June 1986 and was replaced by Hans Matzenauer (SPÖ) on 18 June 1986.

==== 1970s ====
===== 1979 =====
Results of the 1979 legislative election held on 6 May 1979:

| Party | | Votes | % | Seats |
|---|---|---|---|---|
| Socialist Party of Austria | SPÖ | 610,360 | 60.60% | 23 |
| Austrian People's Party | ÖVP | 334,088 | 33.17% | 12 |
| Freedom Party of Austria | FPÖ | 47,694 | 4.74% | 1 |
| Communist Party of Austria | KPÖ | 15,003 | 1.49% | 0 |
| Valid Votes | | 1,007,145 | 100.00% | 36 |
| Rejected Votes | | 9,876 | 0.97% | |
| Total Polled | | 1,017,021 | 86.19% | |
| Registered Electors | | 1,179,919 | | |

The following candidates were elected: Anneliese Albrecht (SPÖ); Hannes Androsch (SPÖ); Anton Benya (SPÖ); Helmut Braun (SPÖ); Christian Broda (SPÖ); Adolf Czettel (SPÖ); Alfred Dallinger (SPÖ); Karl Dittrich (ÖVP); Hertha Firnberg (SPÖ); Heinz Fischer (SPÖ); Walter Hauser (ÖVP); Hilde Hawlicek (SPÖ); Kurt Heindl (SPÖ); Hans Hobl (SPÖ); Marga Hubinek (ÖVP); Franz Karasek (ÖVP); Herbert Kohlmaier (ÖVP); Friedrich König (ÖVP); Erwin Lanc (SPÖ); Karl Lausecker (SPÖ); Maria Metzker (SPÖ); Kurt Mühlbacher (SPÖ); Ernst Nedwed (SPÖ); Heinrich Neisser (ÖVP); Rudolf Sallinger (ÖVP); Stefan Schemer (SPÖ); Hermann Schnell (SPÖ); Edgar Schranz (SPÖ); Walter Schwimmer (ÖVP); Erika Seda (SPÖ); Karl Sekanina (SPÖ); Josef Staribacher (SPÖ); Norbert Steger (FPÖ); Heribert Steinbauer (ÖVP); Ingrid Tichy-Schreder (ÖVP); and Günther Wiesinger (ÖVP).

Substitutions:

- Franz Karasek (ÖVP) resigned on 2 October 1979 and was replaced by Wendelin Ettmayer (ÖVP) on 5 October 1979.
- Erika Seda (SPÖ) resigned on 20 October 1980 and was replaced by Ernst Eugen Veselsky (SPÖ) on 21 October 1980.
- Hannes Androsch (SPÖ) resigned on 16 February 1981 and was replaced by Franz Löschnak (SPÖ) on 17 February 1981.
- Anneliese Albrecht (SPÖ) resigned on 5 October 1981 and was replaced by Ingrid Smejkal (SPÖ) on 6 October 1981.

===== 1975 =====
Results of the 1975 legislative election held on 5 October 1975:

| Party | | Votes | % | Seats |
|---|---|---|---|---|
| Socialist Party of Austria | SPÖ | 624,072 | 59.84% | 23 |
| Austrian People's Party | ÖVP | 354,453 | 33.99% | 13 |
| Freedom Party of Austria | FPÖ | 42,638 | 4.09% | 1 |
| Communist Party of Austria | KPÖ | 20,739 | 1.99% | 0 |
| Group of Revolutionary Marxists | GRM | 1,024 | 0.10% | 0 |
| Valid Votes | | 1,042,926 | 100.00% | 37 |
| Rejected Votes | | 8,065 | 0.77% | |
| Total Polled | | 1,050,991 | 87.68% | |
| Registered Electors | | 1,198,647 | | |

The following candidates were elected: Anneliese Albrecht (SPÖ); Hannes Androsch (SPÖ); Franz Bauer (ÖVP); Anton Benya (SPÖ); Christian Broda (SPÖ); Tassilo Broesigke (FPÖ); Erhard Busek (ÖVP); Karl Czernetz (SPÖ); Alfred Dallinger (SPÖ); Kurt Fiedler (ÖVP); Hertha Firnberg (SPÖ); Heinz Fischer (SPÖ); Josef Frühwirth (ÖVP); Walter Hauser (ÖVP); Kurt Heindl (SPÖ); Hans Hobl (SPÖ); Marga Hubinek (ÖVP); Franz Karasek (ÖVP); Herbert Kohlmaier (ÖVP); Friedrich König (ÖVP); Josef Kostelecky (SPÖ); Erwin Lanc (SPÖ); Karl Lausecker (SPÖ); Maria Metzker (SPÖ); Kurt Mühlbacher (SPÖ); Heinz Nittel (SPÖ); Otto Probst (SPÖ); Rudolf Sallinger (ÖVP); Stefan Schemer (SPÖ); Hermann Schnell (SPÖ); Edgar Schranz (SPÖ); Walter Schwimmer (ÖVP); Erika Seda (SPÖ); Karl Sekanina (SPÖ); Josef Staribacher (SPÖ); Karl Wedenig (ÖVP); and Günther Wiesinger (ÖVP).

Substitutions:

- Josef Kostelecky (SPÖ) resigned on 12 February 1976 and was replaced by Johann Hatzl (SPÖ) on 23 February 1976.
- Heinz Nittel (SPÖ) resigned on 28 September 1976 and was replaced by Hilde Hawlicek (SPÖ) on 4 October 1976.
- Franz Bauer (ÖVP) resigned on 20 June 1977 and was replaced by Wendelin Ettmayer (ÖVP) on 22 June 1977.
- Karl Czernetz (SPÖ) died on 3 August 1978 and was replaced by Ernst Nedwed (SPÖ) on 21 September 1978.
- Erhard Busek (ÖVP) resigned on 7 November 1978 and was replaced by Karl Dittrich (ÖVP) on the same day.
- Otto Probst (SPÖ) died on 22 December 1978 and was replaced by Helmut Braun (SPÖ) on 23 January 1979.
- Johann Hatzl (SPÖ) resigned on 14 February 1979 and was replaced by Adolf Czettel (SPÖ) on 21 February 1979.

===== 1971 =====
Results of the 1971 legislative election held on 10 October 1971:

| Party | | Votes | % | Seats |
|---|---|---|---|---|
| Socialist Party of Austria | SPÖ | 641,596 | 59.49% | 24 |
| Austrian People's Party | ÖVP | 365,266 | 33.87% | 14 |
| Freedom Party of Austria | FPÖ | 46,794 | 4.34% | 1 |
| Communist Party of Austria | KPÖ | 22,941 | 2.13% | 0 |
| Offensive Left | OL | 1,874 | 0.17% | 0 |
| Valid Votes | | 1,078,471 | 100.00% | 39 |
| Rejected Votes | | 8,246 | 0.76% | |
| Total Polled | | 1,086,717 | 87.40% | |
| Registered Electors | | 1,243,424 | | |

The following candidates were elected: Anneliese Albrecht (SPÖ); Hannes Androsch (SPÖ); Franz Bauer (ÖVP); Anton Benya (SPÖ); Christian Broda (SPÖ); Tassilo Broesigke (FPÖ); Karl Czernetz (SPÖ); Kurt Fiedler (ÖVP); Hertha Firnberg (SPÖ); Heinz Fischer (SPÖ); Franz Fleischmann (SPÖ); Leopold Gratz (SPÖ); Friedrich Hahn (ÖVP); Rudolf Häuser (SPÖ); Walter Hauser (ÖVP); Hans Hobl (SPÖ); Marga Hubinek (ÖVP); Franz Karasek (ÖVP); Herbert Kohlmaier (ÖVP); Friedrich König (ÖVP); Josef Kostelecky (SPÖ); Erwin Lanc (SPÖ); Franz Linsbauer (ÖVP); Hans Mayr (SPÖ); Maria Metzker (SPÖ); Otto Mitterer (ÖVP); Kurt Mühlbacher (SPÖ); Kurt Neuner (ÖVP); Otto Probst (SPÖ); Rudolf Sallinger (ÖVP); Peter Schieder (SPÖ); Hermann Schnell (SPÖ); Edgar Schranz (SPÖ); Walter Schwimmer (ÖVP); Erika Seda (SPÖ); Karl Sekanina (SPÖ); Josef Staribacher (SPÖ); Karl Wedenig (ÖVP); and Robert Weisz (SPÖ).

Substitutions:

- Leopold Gratz (SPÖ) resigned on 15 June 1973 and was replaced by Karl Lausecker (SPÖ) on 18 June 1973.
- Hans Mayr (SPÖ) resigned on 21 November 1973 and was replaced by Kurt Heindl (SPÖ) on 26 November 1973.
- Peter Schieder (SPÖ) resigned on 21 November 1973 and was replaced by Alfred Gisel (SPÖ) on 26 November 1973.
- Friedrich Hahn (ÖVP) resigned on 23 November 1973 and was replaced by Günther Wiesinger (ÖVP) on 26 November 1973.
- Rudolf Häuser (SPÖ) resigned on 15 October 1974 and was replaced by Alfred Dallinger (SPÖ) on 17 October 1974.

===== 1970 =====
Results of the 1970 legislative election held on 1 March 1970:

| Party | | Vienna Inner East | | Vienna Inner West | | Vienna North East | | Vienna North West | | Vienna South East | | Vienna South West | | Vienna West | | Total votes | % | Seats | | |
| Party | | Votes | Seats | Votes | Seats | Votes | Seats | Votes | Seats | Votes | Seats | Votes | Seats | Votes | Seats | Total votes | % | Dis. | Uni. | Tot. |
|---|---|---|---|---|---|---|---|---|---|---|---|---|---|---|---|---|---|---|---|---|
| Socialist Party of Austria | SPÖ | 51,578 | 2 | 28,208 | 1 | 158,324 | 5 | 56,425 | 2 | 122,643 | 4 | 115,666 | 4 | 104,003 | 4 | 636,847 | 57.43% | 22 | 1 | 23 |
| Austrian People's Party | ÖVP | 56,819 | 2 | 36,773 | 2 | 67,335 | 2 | 62,478 | 2 | 49,552 | 1 | 70,131 | 2 | 54,937 | 2 | 398,025 | 35.89% | 13 | 2 | 15 |
| Freedom Party of Austria | FPÖ | 6,203 | 0 | 4,275 | 0 | 7,802 | 0 | 7,170 | 0 | 5,112 | 0 | 7,766 | 0 | 5,792 | 0 | 44,120 | 3.98% | 0 | 0 | 0 |
| Communist Party of Austria | KPÖ | 1,209 | 0 | 507 | 0 | 6,188 | 0 | 1,222 | 0 | 3,303 | 0 | 2,685 | 0 | 2,514 | 0 | 17,628 | 1.59% | 0 | 0 | 0 |
| Democratic Progressive Party | DFP | 1,122 | 0 | 714 | 0 | 2,541 | 0 | 1,184 | 0 | 1,837 | 0 | 2,161 | 0 | 1,938 | 0 | 11,497 | 1.04% | 0 | 0 | 0 |
| National Democratic Party | NDP | 262 | 0 | 0 | 0 | 0 | 0 | 275 | 0 | 316 | 0 | 0 | 0 | 0 | 0 | 853 | 0.08% | 0 | 0 | 0 |
| Valid Votes | | 117,193 | 4 | 70,477 | 3 | 242,190 | 7 | 128,754 | 4 | 182,763 | 5 | 198,409 | 6 | 169,184 | 6 | 1,108,970 | 100.00% | 35 | 3 | 38 |
| Rejected Votes | | 773 | | 448 | | 1,497 | | 828 | | 1,155 | | 1,507 | | 1,082 | | 7,290 | 0.65% | | | |
| Total Polled | | 117,966 | | 70,925 | | 243,687 | | 129,582 | | 183,918 | | 199,916 | | 170,266 | | 1,116,260 | 87.96% | | | |
| Registered Electors | | 137,143 | | 83,675 | | 273,935 | | 148,170 | | 206,871 | | 224,444 | | 194,792 | | 1,269,030 | | | | |
| Turnout | | 86.02% | | 84.76% | | 88.96% | | 87.45% | | 88.90% | | 89.07% | | 87.41% | | 87.96% | | | | |

The following candidates were elected:

- Electoral union seats - Kurt Fiedler (ÖVP); Maria Metzker (SPÖ); and Kurt Neuner (ÖVP).

On 24 June 1970 the Constitutional Court annulled the results in Vienna Inner East, Vienna North West and Vienna South East as the nomination papers of the National Democratic Party were signed by fewer than 200 eligible voters. Results of the re-run held on 4 October 1970:

| Party | | Vienna Inner East | | Vienna Inner West | | Vienna North East | | Vienna North West | | Vienna South East | | Vienna South West | | Vienna West | | Total votes | % | Seats | | |
| Party | | Votes | Seats | Votes | Seats | Votes | Seats | Votes | Seats | Votes | Seats | Votes | Seats | Votes | Seats | Total votes | % | Dis. | Uni. | Tot. |
|---|---|---|---|---|---|---|---|---|---|---|---|---|---|---|---|---|---|---|---|---|
| Socialist Party of Austria | SPÖ | 48,045 | 2 | 28,208 | 1 | 158,324 | 5 | 54,152 | 2 | 114,525 | 4 | 115,666 | 4 | 104,003 | 4 | 622,923 | 58.66% | 22 | 1 | 23 |
| Austrian People's Party | ÖVP | 47,868 | 2 | 36,773 | 2 | 67,335 | 2 | 53,047 | 2 | 40,937 | 1 | 70,130 | 2 | 54,937 | 2 | 371,027 | 34.94% | 13 | 1 | 14 |
| Freedom Party of Austria | FPÖ | 5,820 | 0 | 4,275 | 0 | 7,802 | 0 | 6,864 | 0 | 4,863 | 0 | 7,766 | 0 | 5,792 | 0 | 43,182 | 4.07% | 0 | 1 | 1 |
| Communist Party of Austria | KPÖ | 797 | 0 | 507 | 0 | 6,188 | 0 | 769 | 0 | 2,229 | 0 | 2,685 | 0 | 2,514 | 0 | 15,689 | 1.48% | 0 | 0 | 0 |
| Democratic Progressive Party | DFP | 453 | 0 | 714 | 0 | 2,541 | 0 | 537 | 0 | 673 | 0 | 2,161 | 0 | 1,938 | 0 | 9,017 | 0.85% | 0 | 0 | 0 |
| Valid Votes | | 102,983 | 4 | 70,477 | 3 | 242,190 | 7 | 115,369 | 4 | 163,227 | 5 | 198,408 | 6 | 169,184 | 6 | 1,061,838 | 100.00% | 35 | 3 | 38 |
| Rejected Votes | | 540 | | 448 | | 1,497 | | 624 | | 839 | | 1,508 | | 1,082 | | 6,538 | 0.61% | | | |
| Total Polled | | 103,523 | | 70,925 | | 243,687 | | 115,993 | | 164,066 | | 199,916 | | 170,266 | | 1,068,376 | 84.19% | | | |
| Registered Electors | | 137,143 | | 83,675 | | 273,935 | | 148,170 | | 206,871 | | 224,444 | | 194,792 | | 1,269,030 | | | | |
| Turnout | | 75.49% | | 84.76% | | 88.96% | | 78.28% | | 79.31% | | 89.07% | | 87.41% | | 84.19% | | | | |

The following candidates were elected:

- Electoral union seats - Tassilo Broesigke (FPÖ); Kurt Fiedler (ÖVP); and Maria Metzker (SPÖ).

==== 1960s ====
===== 1966 =====
Results of the 1966 legislative election held on 6 March 1966:

| Party | | Vienna Inner East | | Vienna Inner West | | Vienna North East | | Vienna North West | | Vienna South East | | Vienna South West | | Vienna West | | Total votes | % | Seats | | |
| Party | | Votes | Seats | Votes | Seats | Votes | Seats | Votes | Seats | Votes | Seats | Votes | Seats | Votes | Seats | Total votes | % | Dis. | Uni. | Tot. |
|---|---|---|---|---|---|---|---|---|---|---|---|---|---|---|---|---|---|---|---|---|
| Socialist Party of Austria | SPÖ | 47,037 | 1 | 26,160 | 1 | 124,349 | 4 | 51,074 | 2 | 107,167 | 4 | 105,013 | 4 | 96,696 | 3 | 557,496 | 49.37% | 19 | 2 | 21 |
| Austrian People's Party | ÖVP | 64,464 | 2 | 43,089 | 2 | 67,187 | 2 | 68,391 | 3 | 51,909 | 2 | 73,789 | 2 | 58,931 | 2 | 427,760 | 37.88% | 15 | 1 | 16 |
| Democratic Progressive Party | DFP | 8,839 | 0 | 5,439 | 0 | 14,325 | 0 | 9,108 | 0 | 12,682 | 0 | 14,138 | 0 | 14,538 | 0 | 79,069 | 7.00% | 0 | 0 | 0 |
| Freedom Party of Austria | FPÖ | 6,426 | 0 | 4,430 | 0 | 7,581 | 0 | 6,928 | 0 | 5,641 | 0 | 7,984 | 0 | 6,537 | 0 | 45,527 | 4.03% | 0 | 1 | 1 |
| Communists and Left Socialists | KLS | 0 | 0 | 0 | 0 | 18,636 | 0 | 0 | 0 | 0 | 0 | 0 | 0 | 0 | 0 | 18,636 | 1.65% | 0 | 0 | 0 |
| Marxist–Leninist Party of Austria | MLÖ | 0 | 0 | 0 | 0 | 0 | 0 | 0 | 0 | 486 | 0 | 0 | 0 | 0 | 0 | 486 | 0.04% | 0 | 0 | 0 |
| Liberal Party of Austria | LPÖ | 0 | 0 | 72 | 0 | 0 | 0 | 176 | 0 | 0 | 0 | 0 | 0 | 0 | 0 | 248 | 0.02% | 0 | 0 | 0 |
| Valid Votes | | 126,766 | 3 | 79,190 | 3 | 232,078 | 6 | 135,677 | 5 | 177,885 | 6 | 200,924 | 6 | 176,702 | 5 | 1,129,222 | 100.00% | 34 | 4 | 38 |
| Rejected Votes | | 1,250 | | 744 | | 2,201 | | 1,293 | | 1,732 | | 2,365 | | 1,841 | | 11,426 | 1.00% | | | |
| Total Polled | | 128,016 | | 79,934 | | 234,279 | | 136,970 | | 179,617 | | 203,289 | | 178,543 | | 1,140,648 | 90.07% | | | |
| Registered Electors | | 144,144 | | 90,359 | | 257,835 | | 151,645 | | 199,896 | | 223,392 | | 199,104 | | 1,266,375 | | | | |
| Turnout | | 88.81% | | 88.46% | | 90.86% | | 90.32% | | 89.86% | | 91.00% | | 89.67% | | 90.07% | | | | |

The following candidates were elected:

- Electoral union seats - Otto Skritek (SPÖ); Josef Staribacher (SPÖ); Karl Titze (ÖVP); and Emil van Tongel (FPÖ).

===== 1962 =====
Results of the 1962 legislative election held on 18 November 1962:

| Party | | Vienna Inner East | | Vienna Inner West | | Vienna North East | | Vienna North West | | Vienna South East | | Vienna South West | | Vienna West | | Total votes | % | Seats | | |
| Party | | Votes | Seats | Votes | Seats | Votes | Seats | Votes | Seats | Votes | Seats | Votes | Seats | Votes | Seats | Total votes | % | Dis. | Uni. | Tot. |
|---|---|---|---|---|---|---|---|---|---|---|---|---|---|---|---|---|---|---|---|---|
| Socialist Party of Austria | SPÖ | 52,134 | 1 | 30,793 | 1 | 129,456 | 4 | 57,268 | 2 | 109,490 | 4 | 110,533 | 4 | 105,591 | 4 | 595,265 | 52.42% | 20 | 2 | 22 |
| Austrian People's Party | ÖVP | 61,234 | 2 | 41,103 | 1 | 58,052 | 2 | 62,859 | 2 | 46,985 | 1 | 66,457 | 2 | 55,295 | 2 | 391,985 | 34.52% | 12 | 2 | 14 |
| Freedom Party of Austria | FPÖ | 11,171 | 0 | 7,999 | 0 | 11,420 | 0 | 12,037 | 0 | 8,762 | 0 | 12,672 | 0 | 10,794 | 0 | 74,855 | 6.59% | 0 | 2 | 2 |
| Communists and Left Socialists | KLS | 3,817 | 0 | 1,938 | 0 | 21,091 | 0 | 3,782 | 0 | 10,094 | 0 | 8,299 | 0 | 8,266 | 0 | 57,287 | 5.04% | 0 | 0 | 0 |
| European Federal Party of Austria | EFP | 2,430 | 0 | 1,533 | 0 | 2,729 | 0 | 2,667 | 0 | 2,051 | 0 | 2,619 | 0 | 2,203 | 0 | 16,232 | 1.43% | 0 | 0 | 0 |
| Valid Votes | | 130,786 | 3 | 83,366 | 2 | 222,748 | 6 | 138,613 | 4 | 177,382 | 5 | 200,580 | 6 | 182,149 | 6 | 1,135,624 | 100.00% | 32 | 6 | 38 |
| Rejected Votes | | 1,034 | | 718 | | 2,080 | | 1,237 | | 1,564 | | 2,016 | | 1,782 | | 10,431 | 0.91% | | | |
| Total Polled | | 131,820 | | 84,084 | | 224,828 | | 139,850 | | 178,946 | | 202,596 | | 183,931 | | 1,146,055 | 90.64% | | | |
| Registered Electors | | 148,849 | | 94,324 | | 246,136 | | 153,073 | | 196,510 | | 221,464 | | 204,041 | | 1,264,397 | | | | |
| Turnout | | 88.56% | | 89.14% | | 91.34% | | 91.36% | | 91.06% | | 91.48% | | 90.14% | | 90.64% | | | | |

The following candidates were elected:

- Electoral union seats - Kurt Fiedler (ÖVP); Willfried Gredler (FPÖ); Stella Klein-Löw (SPÖ); Kurt Neuner (ÖVP); Josef Staribacher (SPÖ); and Emil van Tongel (FPÖ).

Substitutions:

- Willfried Gredler (FPÖ) resigned on 2 November 1963 and was replaced by Tassilo Broesigke (FPÖ) on 4 November 1963.

==== 1950s ====
===== 1959 =====
Results of the 1959 legislative election held on 10 May 1959:

| Party | | Vienna Inner East | | Vienna Inner West | | Vienna North East | | Vienna North West | | Vienna South East | | Vienna South West | | Vienna West | | Total votes | % | Seats | | |
| Party | | Votes | Seats | Votes | Seats | Votes | Seats | Votes | Seats | Votes | Seats | Votes | Seats | Votes | Seats | Total votes | % | Dis. | Uni. | Tot. |
|---|---|---|---|---|---|---|---|---|---|---|---|---|---|---|---|---|---|---|---|---|
| Socialist Party of Austria | SPÖ | 51,959 | 2 | 31,687 | 1 | 123,947 | 4 | 57,174 | 2 | 104,870 | 4 | 109,023 | 4 | 105,826 | 4 | 584,486 | 52.38% | 21 | 2 | 23 |
| Austrian People's Party | ÖVP | 60,909 | 2 | 41,605 | 1 | 54,770 | 2 | 60,665 | 2 | 45,279 | 1 | 64,709 | 2 | 55,597 | 2 | 383,534 | 34.37% | 12 | 3 | 15 |
| Freedom Party of Austria | FPÖ | 12,790 | 0 | 9,528 | 0 | 12,378 | 0 | 13,778 | 0 | 9,186 | 0 | 13,529 | 0 | 11,888 | 0 | 83,077 | 7.44% | 0 | 2 | 2 |
| Communists and Left Socialists | KLS | 4,456 | 0 | 2,400 | 0 | 21,619 | 0 | 4,154 | 0 | 12,202 | 0 | 9,655 | 0 | 10,308 | 0 | 64,794 | 5.81% | 0 | 0 | 0 |
| Valid Votes | | 130,114 | 4 | 85,220 | 2 | 212,714 | 6 | 135,771 | 4 | 171,537 | 5 | 196,916 | 6 | 183,619 | 6 | 1,115,891 | 100.00% | 33 | 7 | 40 |
| Rejected Votes | | 1,591 | | 1,034 | | 2,628 | | 1,628 | | 2,085 | | 2,693 | | 2,359 | | 14,018 | 1.24% | | | |
| Total Polled | | 131,705 | | 86,254 | | 215,342 | | 137,399 | | 173,622 | | 199,609 | | 185,978 | | 1,129,909 | 91.41% | | | |
| Registered Electors | | 148,159 | | 96,610 | | 233,053 | | 150,059 | | 188,328 | | 216,635 | | 203,305 | | 1,236,149 | | | | |
| Turnout | | 88.89% | | 89.28% | | 92.40% | | 91.56% | | 92.19% | | 92.14% | | 91.48% | | 91.41% | | | | |

The following candidates were elected:

- Electoral union seats - Robert Bechinie (SPÖ); Hans Ehgartner (ÖVP); Willfried Gredler (FPÖ); Edmund Grünsteidl (ÖVP); Stella Klein-Löw (SPÖ); Hans Kulhanek (ÖVP); and Emil van Tongel (FPÖ).

===== 1956 =====
Results of the 1956 legislative election held on 13 May 1956:

| Party | | Vienna Inner East | | Vienna Inner West | | Vienna North East | | Vienna North West | | Vienna South East | | Vienna South West | | Vienna West | | Total votes | % | Seats | | |
| Party | | Votes | Seats | Votes | Seats | Votes | Seats | Votes | Seats | Votes | Seats | Votes | Seats | Votes | Seats | Total votes | % | Dis. | Uni. | Tot. |
|---|---|---|---|---|---|---|---|---|---|---|---|---|---|---|---|---|---|---|---|---|
| Socialist Party of Austria | SPÖ | 50,438 | 2 | 31,718 | 1 | 116,673 | 4 | 55,743 | 2 | 98,784 | 4 | 106,142 | 4 | 103,265 | 4 | 562,763 | 49.74% | 21 | 1 | 22 |
| Austrian People's Party | ÖVP | 65,729 | 2 | 46,144 | 2 | 56,554 | 2 | 64,763 | 2 | 46,207 | 1 | 67,414 | 2 | 59,759 | 2 | 406,570 | 35.93% | 13 | 2 | 15 |
| Communists and Left Socialists | KLS | 7,413 | 0 | 3,838 | 0 | 28,788 | 1 | 6,917 | 0 | 17,838 | 0 | 15,226 | 0 | 16,598 | 0 | 96,618 | 8.54% | 1 | 1 | 2 |
| Freedom Party of Austria | FPÖ | 10,686 | 0 | 8,594 | 0 | 8,528 | 0 | 10,618 | 0 | 6,143 | 0 | 10,206 | 0 | 8,687 | 0 | 63,462 | 5.61% | 0 | 1 | 1 |
| Free Workers Movement of Austria | | 116 | 0 | 311 | 0 | 562 | 0 | 0 | 0 | 0 | 0 | 0 | 0 | 823 | 0 | 1,812 | 0.16% | 0 | 0 | 0 |
| Ergocratic Party | | 0 | 0 | 67 | 0 | 0 | 0 | 0 | 0 | 0 | 0 | 0 | 0 | 121 | 0 | 188 | 0.02% | 0 | 0 | 0 |
| Austrian Patriotic Union | ÖPU | 0 | 0 | 0 | 0 | 0 | 0 | 37 | 0 | 0 | 0 | 0 | 0 | 46 | 0 | 83 | 0.01% | 0 | 0 | 0 |
| Austrian Middle Class Party | | 0 | 0 | 0 | 0 | 23 | 0 | 0 | 0 | 0 | 0 | 0 | 0 | 0 | 0 | 23 | 0.00% | 0 | 0 | 0 |
| Valid Votes | | 134,382 | 4 | 90,672 | 3 | 211,128 | 7 | 138,078 | 4 | 168,972 | 5 | 198,988 | 6 | 189,299 | 6 | 1,131,519 | 100.00% | 35 | 5 | 40 |
| Rejected Votes | | 2,817 | | 1,866 | | 4,411 | | 3,047 | | 3,629 | | 4,578 | | 4,022 | | 24,370 | 2.11% | | | |
| Total Polled | | 137,199 | | 92,538 | | 215,539 | | 141,125 | | 172,601 | | 203,566 | | 193,321 | | 1,155,889 | 94.48% | | | |
| Registered Electors | | 147,420 | | 99,953 | | 227,501 | | 148,994 | | 181,629 | | 213,854 | | 204,022 | | 1,223,373 | | | | |
| Turnout | | 93.07% | | 92.58% | | 94.74% | | 94.72% | | 95.03% | | 95.19% | | 94.75% | | 94.48% | | | | |

The following candidates were elected:

- Electoral union seats - Ernst Fischer (KLS); Willfried Gredler (FPÖ); Franz Krippner (ÖVP); Karl Kysela (SPÖ); and Michael Walla (ÖVP).

Substitutions:

- Franz Krippner (ÖVP) was reassigned to the Vienna North East seat vacated by Ignaz Köck and was replaced by Karl Kummer (ÖVP) in Electoral Union I on 12 December 1956.
- Karl Kysela (SPÖ) was reassigned to the Vienna West seat vacated by Adolf Schärf and was replaced by Otto Probst (SPÖ) in Electoral Union I.
- Otto Probst (SPÖ) was reassigned to the Vienna South East seat vacated by Leo Geiger and was replaced by Franz Jonas (SPÖ) in Electoral Union I.
- Karl Kummer (ÖVP) was reassigned to the Vienna West seat vacated by Karl Gruber and was replaced by Hans Kulhanek (ÖVP) in Electoral Union I on 24 October 1958.

===== 1953 =====
Results of the 1953 legislative election held on 22 February 1953:

| Party | | Vienna Inner East | | Vienna Inner West | | Vienna North East | | Vienna North West | | Vienna South East | | Vienna South West | | Vienna West | | Total votes | % | Seats | | |
| Party | | Votes | Seats | Votes | Seats | Votes | Seats | Votes | Seats | Votes | Seats | Votes | Seats | Votes | Seats | Total votes | % | Dis. | Uni. | Tot. |
|---|---|---|---|---|---|---|---|---|---|---|---|---|---|---|---|---|---|---|---|---|
| Socialist Party of Austria | SPÖ | 54,160 | 2 | 35,857 | 1 | 120,874 | 4 | 59,309 | 2 | 101,209 | 4 | 108,473 | 4 | 110,650 | 4 | 590,532 | 50.15% | 21 | 1 | 22 |
| Austrian People's Party | ÖVP | 59,371 | 2 | 42,351 | 1 | 49,173 | 1 | 57,513 | 2 | 40,277 | 1 | 59,496 | 2 | 53,967 | 2 | 362,148 | 30.75% | 11 | 2 | 13 |
| Federation of Independents | WdU | 18,842 | 0 | 16,138 | 0 | 18,185 | 0 | 21,570 | 0 | 12,594 | 0 | 19,290 | 0 | 18,064 | 0 | 124,683 | 10.59% | 0 | 3 | 3 |
| Electoral Community of the Austrian People's Opposition (KPÖ, Left Socialists and Democratic Union) | VO | 7,627 | 0 | 4,015 | 0 | 26,478 | 0 | 7,105 | 0 | 16,806 | 0 | 15,602 | 0 | 16,305 | 0 | 93,938 | 7.98% | 0 | 2 | 2 |
| Bipartisan Agreement of the Centre | | 325 | 0 | 300 | 0 | 353 | 0 | 468 | 0 | 274 | 0 | 403 | 0 | 386 | 0 | 2,509 | 0.21% | 0 | 0 | 0 |
| Free Democrats | | 209 | 0 | 336 | 0 | 146 | 0 | 181 | 0 | 231 | 0 | 685 | 0 | 233 | 0 | 2,021 | 0.17% | 0 | 0 | 0 |
| Christian Social Party and Non-Party Personalities | | 189 | 0 | 154 | 0 | 261 | 0 | 190 | 0 | 185 | 0 | 292 | 0 | 225 | 0 | 1,496 | 0.13% | 0 | 0 | 0 |
| Austrian National Republicans and Independents | | 77 | 0 | 0 | 0 | 0 | 0 | 0 | 0 | 63 | 0 | 73 | 0 | 44 | 0 | 257 | 0.02% | 0 | 0 | 0 |
| Austrian Patriotic Union | ÖPU | 0 | 0 | 0 | 0 | 0 | 0 | 0 | 0 | 0 | 0 | 0 | 0 | 26 | 0 | 26 | 0.00% | 0 | 0 | 0 |
| Valid Votes | | 140,800 | 4 | 99,151 | 2 | 215,470 | 5 | 146,336 | 4 | 171,639 | 5 | 204,314 | 6 | 199,900 | 6 | 1,177,610 | 100.00% | 32 | 8 | 40 |
| Rejected Votes | | 1,795 | | 1,332 | | 2,687 | | 1,760 | | 2,046 | | 2,804 | | 2,547 | | 14,971 | 1.26% | | | |
| Total Polled | | 142,595 | | 100,483 | | 218,157 | | 148,096 | | 173,685 | | 207,118 | | 202,447 | | 1,192,581 | 96.70% | | | |
| Registered Electors | | 149,096 | | 105,583 | | 225,309 | | 152,743 | | 179,314 | | 212,895 | | 208,381 | | 1,233,321 | | | | |
| Turnout | | 95.64% | | 95.17% | | 96.83% | | 96.96% | | 96.86% | | 97.29% | | 97.15% | | 96.70% | | | | |

The following candidates were elected:

- Electoral union seats - Ernst Fischer (VO); Willfried Gredler (WdU); Johann Koplenig (VO); Franz Krippner (ÖVP); Karl Kysela (SPÖ); Helfried Pfeifer (WdU); Fritz Stüber (WdU); and Michael Walla (ÖVP).

==== 1940s ====
===== 1949 =====
Results of the 1949 legislative election held on 9 October 1949:

| Party | | Vienna Inner East | | Vienna Inner West | | Vienna North East | | Vienna North West | | Vienna South East | | Vienna South West | | Vienna West | | Total votes | % | Seats | | |
| Party | | Votes | Seats | Votes | Seats | Votes | Seats | Votes | Seats | Votes | Seats | Votes | Seats | Votes | Seats | Total votes | % | Dis. | Uni. | Tot. |
|---|---|---|---|---|---|---|---|---|---|---|---|---|---|---|---|---|---|---|---|---|
| Socialist Party of Austria | SPÖ | 51,977 | 2 | 34,492 | 1 | 112,655 | 5 | 57,188 | 2 | 94,844 | 4 | 105,287 | 4 | 108,997 | 4 | 565,440 | 49.51% | 22 | 2 | 24 |
| Austrian People's Party | ÖVP | 63,035 | 3 | 47,958 | 2 | 55,860 | 2 | 62,497 | 2 | 43,889 | 2 | 66,506 | 2 | 62,109 | 2 | 401,854 | 35.18% | 15 | 2 | 17 |
| Left Bloc (KPÖ and Left Socialists) | LB | 7,453 | 0 | 4,361 | 0 | 22,602 | 1 | 7,059 | 0 | 16,135 | 0 | 15,499 | 0 | 16,601 | 0 | 89,710 | 7.85% | 1 | 2 | 3 |
| Federation of Independents | WdU | 12,418 | 0 | 11,137 | 0 | 10,226 | 0 | 15,755 | 0 | 6,652 | 0 | 12,182 | 0 | 10,779 | 0 | 79,149 | 6.93% | 0 | 2 | 2 |
| Democratic Union | DU | 698 | 0 | 584 | 0 | 327 | 0 | 540 | 0 | 258 | 0 | 540 | 0 | 358 | 0 | 3,305 | 0.29% | 0 | 0 | 0 |
| Fourth Party | | 288 | 0 | 356 | 0 | 418 | 0 | 369 | 0 | 428 | 0 | 438 | 0 | 405 | 0 | 2,702 | 0.24% | 0 | 0 | 0 |
| Valid Votes | | 135,869 | 5 | 98,888 | 3 | 202,088 | 8 | 143,408 | 4 | 162,206 | 6 | 200,452 | 6 | 199,249 | 6 | 1,142,160 | 100.00% | 38 | 8 | 46 |
| Rejected Votes | | 2,362 | | 1,645 | | 2,738 | | 2,218 | | 2,140 | | 2,562 | | 2,286 | | 15,951 | 1.38% | | | |
| Total Polled | | 138,231 | | 100,533 | | 204,826 | | 145,626 | | 164,346 | | 203,014 | | 201,535 | | 1,158,111 | 96.88% | | | |
| Registered Electors | | 144,112 | | 104,940 | | 211,141 | | 150,396 | | 169,012 | | 208,627 | | 207,133 | | 1,195,361 | | | | |
| Turnout | | 95.92% | | 95.80% | | 97.01% | | 96.83% | | 97.24% | | 97.31% | | 97.30% | | 96.88% | | | | |

The following candidates were elected:

- Electoral union seats - Franz Bauer (ÖVP); Ernst Fischer (LB); Erwin Machunze (ÖVP); Karl Maisel (SPÖ); Helfried Pfeifer (WdU); Adolf Schärf (SPÖ); Erwin Scharf (LB); and Fritz Stüber (WdU).

Substitutions:

- Franz Bauer (ÖVP) resigned on 10 October 1950 and was replaced by Franz Dworak (ÖVP) on 8 November 1950.

===== 1945 =====
Results of the 1945 legislative election held on 25 November 1945:

| Party | | Vienna Inner East | | Vienna Inner West | | Vienna North East | | Vienna North West | | Vienna South East | | Vienna South West | | Vienna West | | Total votes | % | Seats | | |
| Party | | Votes | Seats | Votes | Seats | Votes | Seats | Votes | Seats | Votes | Seats | Votes | Seats | Votes | Seats | Total votes | % | Dis. | Uni. | Tot. |
|---|---|---|---|---|---|---|---|---|---|---|---|---|---|---|---|---|---|---|---|---|
| Socialist Party of Austria | SPÖ | 48,237 | 3 | 33,903 | 2 | 98,586 | 5 | 51,687 | 2 | 86,286 | 5 | 89,995 | 5 | 99,520 | 5 | 508,214 | 57.15% | 27 | 1 | 28 |
| Austrian People's Party | ÖVP | 47,659 | 3 | 39,206 | 2 | 41,115 | 2 | 49,951 | 2 | 35,173 | 2 | 50,266 | 2 | 47,433 | 2 | 310,803 | 34.95% | 15 | 1 | 16 |
| Communist Party of Austria | KPÖ | 5,214 | 0 | 3,512 | 0 | 16,602 | 0 | 5,367 | 0 | 13,783 | 0 | 11,872 | 0 | 13,957 | 0 | 70,307 | 7.91% | 0 | 2 | 2 |
| Valid Votes | | 101,110 | 6 | 76,621 | 4 | 156,303 | 7 | 107,005 | 4 | 135,242 | 7 | 152,133 | 7 | 160,910 | 7 | 889,324 | 100.00% | 42 | 4 | 46 |
| Rejected Votes | | 1,021 | | 822 | | 1,278 | | 977 | | 1,102 | | 1,387 | | 1,380 | | 7,967 | 0.89% | | | |
| Total Polled | | 102,131 | | 77,443 | | 157,581 | | 107,982 | | 136,344 | | 153,520 | | 162,290 | | 897,291 | 96.91% | | | |
| Registered Electors | | 106,348 | | 80,483 | | 161,471 | | 112,317 | | 139,474 | | 158,175 | | 167,623 | | 925,891 | | | | |
| Turnout | | 96.03% | | 96.22% | | 97.59% | | 96.14% | | 97.76% | | 97.06% | | 96.82% | | 96.91% | | | | |

The following candidates were elected:

- Electoral union seats - Ernst Fischer (KPÖ); Johann Koplenig (KPÖ); Bruno Pittermann (SPÖ); and Michael Walla (ÖVP).

==== 1930s ====
===== 1930 =====
Results of the 1930 legislative election held on 9 November 1930:

| Party | | Vienna Inner East | | Vienna Inner West | | Vienna North East | | Vienna North West | | Vienna South East | | Vienna South West | | Vienna West | | Total votes | % | Seats | | |
| Party | | Votes | Seats | Votes | Seats | Votes | Seats | Votes | Seats | Votes | Seats | Votes | Seats | Votes | Seats | Total votes | % | Dis. | Uni. | Tot. |
|---|---|---|---|---|---|---|---|---|---|---|---|---|---|---|---|---|---|---|---|---|
| Social Democratic Workers' Party of Austria | SDAPÖ | 68,504 | 3 | 45,022 | 2 | 137,756 | 6 | 73,175 | 2 | 124,517 | 5 | 118,313 | 4 | 136,131 | 5 | 703,418 | 58.98% | 27 | 3 | 30 |
| Christian Social Party and Heimwehr | CSP-HW | 45,257 | 2 | 32,534 | 1 | 39,789 | 1 | 39,967 | 1 | 36,874 | 1 | 45,697 | 1 | 42,761 | 1 | 282,879 | 23.72% | 8 | 3 | 11 |
| National Economy Bloc and Landbund (GDVP, LBd et al.) | NWB-LBd | 23,192 | 1 | 15,048 | 0 | 14,939 | 0 | 20,501 | 0 | 14,988 | 0 | 19,973 | 0 | 15,734 | 0 | 124,375 | 10.43% | 1 | 3 | 4 |
| National Socialist German Workers' Party (Hitler Movement) | NSDAP-H | 4,221 | 0 | 3,251 | 0 | 4,402 | 0 | 5,273 | 0 | 2,912 | 0 | 3,875 | 0 | 3,606 | 0 | 27,540 | 2.31% | 0 | 0 | 0 |
| Homeland Bloc (Heimwehr) | HB | 4,991 | 0 | 3,839 | 0 | 2,693 | 0 | 4,400 | 0 | 3,365 | 0 | 3,792 | 0 | 3,297 | 0 | 26,377 | 2.21% | 0 | 0 | 0 |
| Communist Party of Austria | KPÖ | 464 | 0 | 244 | 0 | 1,974 | 0 | 540 | 0 | 1,959 | 0 | 1,753 | 0 | 3,667 | 0 | 10,601 | 0.89% | 0 | 0 | 0 |
| Austrian People's Party | | 1,214 | 0 | 930 | 0 | 1,100 | 0 | 1,076 | 0 | 1,190 | 0 | 1,249 | 0 | 1,660 | 0 | 8,419 | 0.71% | 0 | 0 | 0 |
| Democratic Centre Party | DMP | 1,720 | 0 | 1,120 | 0 | 1,422 | 0 | 1,361 | 0 | 291 | 0 | 459 | 0 | 346 | 0 | 6,719 | 0.56% | 0 | 0 | 0 |
| Jewish List | | 245 | 0 | 237 | 0 | 1,190 | 0 | 328 | 0 | 65 | 0 | 0 | 0 | 68 | 0 | 2,133 | 0.18% | 0 | 0 | 0 |
| People's Party Loyal to the Emperor | | 0 | 0 | 16 | 0 | 0 | 0 | 0 | 0 | 0 | 0 | 37 | 0 | 104 | 0 | 157 | 0.01% | 0 | 0 | 0 |
| National Democratic Association | | 14 | 0 | 0 | 0 | 11 | 0 | 0 | 0 | 0 | 0 | 21 | 0 | 8 | 0 | 54 | 0.00% | 0 | 0 | 0 |
| Valid Votes | | 149,822 | 6 | 102,241 | 3 | 205,276 | 7 | 146,621 | 3 | 186,161 | 6 | 195,169 | 5 | 207,382 | 6 | 1,192,672 | 100.00% | 36 | 9 | 45 |
| Rejected Votes | | 636 | | 470 | | 780 | | 680 | | 734 | | 934 | | 848 | | 5,082 | 0.42% | | | |
| Total Polled | | 150,458 | | 102,711 | | 206,056 | | 147,301 | | 186,895 | | 196,103 | | 208,230 | | 1,197,754 | 93.38% | | | |
| Registered Electors | | 165,830 | | 112,473 | | 218,278 | | 160,298 | | 197,105 | | 208,740 | | 219,898 | | 1,282,622 | | | | |
| Turnout | | 90.73% | | 91.32% | | 94.40% | | 91.89% | | 94.82% | | 93.95% | | 94.69% | | 93.38% | | | | |

The following candidates were elected:

- Electoral union seats - Bernhard Ellend (CSP-HW); August Forstner (SDAPÖ); Otto Glöckel (SDAPÖ); Alexander Hryntschak (CSP-HW); Emma Kapral (CSP-HW); Maria Schneider (NWB-LBd); Albert Sever (SDAPÖ); Richard Weigl (NWB-LBd); and August von Wotawa (NWB-LBd).

Substitutions:

- Alexander Hryntscha (CSP-HW) was reassigned to the seat vacated by Ignaz Seipel and was replaced by Johann Thomas Wancura (CSP-HW) in Electoral Union I on 2 August 1932.
- August von Wotawa (NWB-LBd) died on 23 May 1933 and was replaced by Johannes Schauer-Schoberlechner (NWB-LBd) on 27 April 1934.

==== 1920s ====
===== 1927 =====
Results of the 1927 legislative election held on 24 April 1927:

| Party | | Vienna Inner East | | Vienna Inner West | | Vienna North East | | Vienna North West | | Vienna South East | | Vienna South West | | Vienna West | | Total votes | % | Seats | | |
| Party | | Votes | Seats | Votes | Seats | Votes | Seats | Votes | Seats | Votes | Seats | Votes | Seats | Votes | Seats | Total votes | % | Dis. | Uni. | Tot. |
|---|---|---|---|---|---|---|---|---|---|---|---|---|---|---|---|---|---|---|---|---|
| Social Democratic Workers' Party of Austria | SDAPÖ | 65,747 | 3 | 46,353 | 2 | 134,019 | 6 | 73,727 | 3 | 123,298 | 5 | 112,343 | 4 | 138,134 | 6 | 693,621 | 59.62% | 29 | 0 | 29 |
| Unity List (CSP, GDVP er al.) | EL | 72,237 | 3 | 52,615 | 2 | 56,762 | 2 | 63,866 | 2 | 52,109 | 2 | 66,378 | 2 | 59,648 | 2 | 423,615 | 36.41% | 15 | 1 | 16 |
| Democratic List (BDP, Austrian Business Party and Employees Party) | | 2,937 | 0 | 2,321 | 0 | 1,968 | 0 | 2,683 | 0 | 1,650 | 0 | 1,964 | 0 | 1,589 | 0 | 15,112 | 1.30% | 0 | 0 | 0 |
| Jewish Party | | 1,317 | 0 | 1,647 | 0 | 5,089 | 0 | 1,954 | 0 | 301 | 0 | 296 | 0 | 241 | 0 | 10,845 | 0.93% | 0 | 0 | 0 |
| Communist Party of Austria | KPÖ | 329 | 0 | 212 | 0 | 1,284 | 0 | 397 | 0 | 1,516 | 0 | 1,329 | 0 | 2,454 | 0 | 7,521 | 0.65% | 0 | 0 | 0 |
| National Socialist Bloc (NSDAP-H et al.) | VSB | 894 | 0 | 935 | 0 | 831 | 0 | 1,597 | 0 | 756 | 0 | 1,175 | 0 | 1,060 | 0 | 7,248 | 0.62% | 0 | 0 | 0 |
| Landbund | Lbd | 469 | 0 | 229 | 0 | 636 | 0 | 533 | 0 | 257 | 0 | 553 | 0 | 415 | 0 | 3,092 | 0.27% | 0 | 0 | 0 |
| Ude-Verband - Association Against Corruption | | 467 | 0 | 317 | 0 | 230 | 0 | 562 | 0 | 0 | 0 | 417 | 0 | 333 | 0 | 2,326 | 0.20% | 0 | 0 | 0 |
| Association of Independent Citizens | | 0 | 0 | 0 | 0 | 0 | 0 | 0 | 0 | 51 | 0 | 9 | 0 | 0 | 0 | 60 | 0.01% | 0 | 0 | 0 |
| Valid Votes | | 144,397 | 6 | 104,629 | 4 | 200,819 | 8 | 145,319 | 5 | 179,938 | 7 | 184,464 | 6 | 203,874 | 8 | 1,163,440 | 100.00% | 44 | 1 | 45 |
| Rejected Votes | | 1,099 | | 669 | | 1,123 | | 842 | | 1,198 | | 1,131 | | 1,206 | | 7,268 | 0.62% | | | |
| Total Polled | | 145,496 | | 105,298 | | 201,942 | | 146,161 | | 181,136 | | 185,595 | | 205,080 | | 1,170,708 | 92.77% | | | |
| Registered Electors | | 162,866 | | 114,275 | | 213,358 | | 158,922 | | 193,004 | | 199,751 | | 219,792 | | 1,261,968 | | | | |
| Turnout | | 89.33% | | 92.14% | | 94.65% | | 91.97% | | 93.85% | | 92.91% | | 93.31% | | 92.77% | | | | |

The following candidates were elected:

- Electoral union seats - Leopold Waber (EL).

Substitutions:

- Leopold Waber (EL) was replaced by Alexander Hryntschak (EL) on 15 January 1929.

===== 1923 =====
Results of the 1923 legislative election held on 21 October 1923:

| Party | | Vienna Inner East | | Vienna Inner West | | Vienna North East | | Vienna North West | | Vienna South East | | Vienna South West | | Vienna West | | Total votes | % | Seats | | |
| Party | | Votes | Seats | Votes | Seats | Votes | Seats | Votes | Seats | Votes | Seats | Votes | Seats | Votes | Seats | Total votes | % | Dis. | Uni. | Tot. |
|---|---|---|---|---|---|---|---|---|---|---|---|---|---|---|---|---|---|---|---|---|
| Social Democratic Workers' Party of Austria | SDAPÖ | 51,425 | 2 | 34,845 | 1 | 110,036 | 5 | 57,270 | 2 | 101,618 | 5 | 93,428 | 4 | 122,842 | 5 | 571,464 | 55.53% | 24 | 3 | 27 |
| Christian Social Party | CSP | 56,835 | 3 | 41,386 | 2 | 43,637 | 2 | 48,679 | 2 | 42,747 | 2 | 53,963 | 2 | 50,536 | 2 | 337,783 | 32.83% | 15 | 1 | 16 |
| Association of the Greater German People's Party and Landbund | GDVP-LBd | 9,553 | 0 | 7,554 | 0 | 5,913 | 0 | 11,075 | 0 | 5,433 | 0 | 8,570 | 0 | 5,521 | 0 | 53,619 | 5.21% | 0 | 2 | 2 |
| Jewish Electoral Group | | 3,638 | 0 | 3,639 | 0 | 10,001 | 0 | 4,584 | 0 | 931 | 0 | 1,120 | 0 | 1,057 | 0 | 24,970 | 2.43% | 0 | 0 | 0 |
| Civic Democratic Labour Party | | 5,465 | 0 | 3,483 | 0 | 1,814 | 0 | 3,669 | 0 | 1,544 | 0 | 1,768 | 0 | 1,143 | 0 | 18,886 | 1.84% | 0 | 0 | 0 |
| Communist Party of Austria | KPÖ | 699 | 0 | 295 | 0 | 2,342 | 0 | 539 | 0 | 2,755 | 0 | 2,555 | 0 | 4,379 | 0 | 13,564 | 1.32% | 0 | 0 | 0 |
| Czechoslovak Minority Party | | 710 | 0 | 825 | 0 | 1,159 | 0 | 605 | 0 | 1,649 | 0 | 820 | 0 | 1,812 | 0 | 7,580 | 0.74% | 0 | 0 | 0 |
| People's Party Loyal to the Emperor | | 287 | 0 | 262 | 0 | 0 | 0 | 0 | 0 | 216 | 0 | 170 | 0 | 225 | 0 | 1,160 | 0.11% | 0 | 0 | 0 |
| Federation of all Workers | | 0 | 0 | 6 | 0 | 0 | 0 | 0 | 0 | 0 | 0 | 0 | 0 | 0 | 0 | 6 | 0.00% | 0 | 0 | 0 |
| Valid Votes | | 128,612 | 5 | 92,295 | 3 | 174,902 | 7 | 126,421 | 4 | 156,893 | 7 | 162,394 | 6 | 187,515 | 7 | 1,029,032 | 100.00% | 39 | 6 | 45 |
| Rejected Votes | | 1,391 | | 1,116 | | 1,564 | | 1,399 | | 1,602 | | 1,689 | | 1,775 | | 10,536 | 1.01% | | | |
| Total Polled | | 130,003 | | 93,411 | | 176,466 | | 127,820 | | 158,495 | | 164,083 | | 189,290 | | 1,039,568 | 91.16% | | | |
| Registered Electors | | 147,883 | | 104,833 | | 188,811 | | 144,251 | | 170,754 | | 178,969 | | 204,822 | | 1,140,323 | | | | |
| Turnout | | 87.91% | | 89.10% | | 93.46% | | 88.61% | | 92.82% | | 91.68% | | 92.42% | | 91.16% | | | | |

The following candidates were elected:

- Electoral union seats - Otto Bauer (SDAPÖ); Otto Glöckel (SDAPÖ); Ferdinand Skaret (SDAPÖ); Leopold Waber (GDVP-LBd); and Ernst Wense (CSP).

Substitutions:

- Ernst Wense (CSP) resigned on 29 October 1924 was replaced by Johann Thomas Wancura (CSP) on 11 November 1924.
