= Maria Neumann =

Austrian politician (born 1970)

Member of the National Council
- Incumbent
- Assumed office 24 January 2018
- Preceded by: Karl Mahrer
- Constituency: Vienna

Personal details
- Born: 5 April 1970 (age 56)
- Party: People's Party

Maria Neumann, formerly Smodics-Neumann (born 5 April 1970), is an Austrian politician of the People's Party serving as a member of the National Council since 2018. From 2020 to 2024, she served as deputy chairwoman of the defense committee.
