= Meri Disoski =

Austrian politician (born 1982)

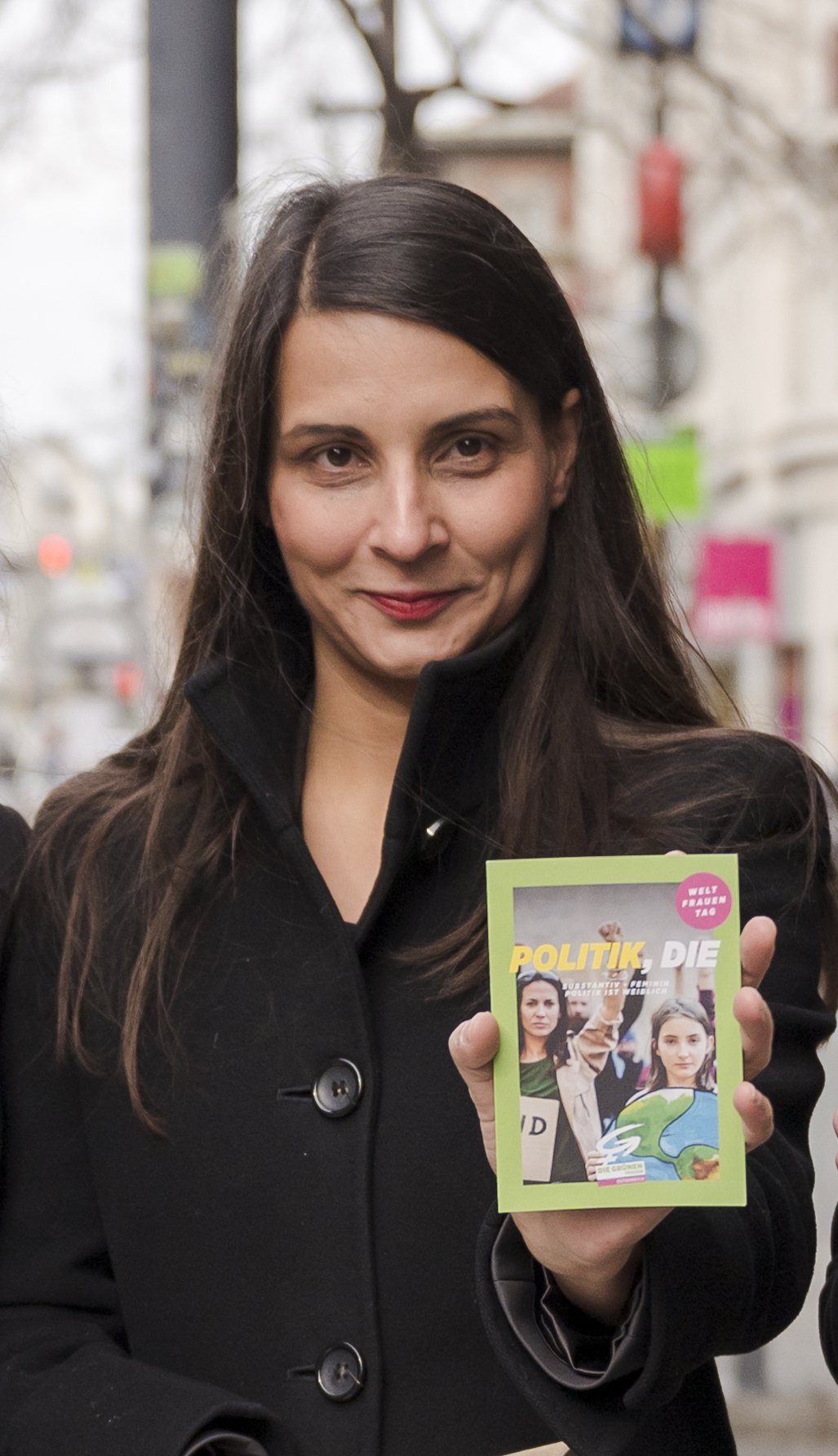
- Disoski in 2023

Member of the National Council
- Incumbent
- Assumed office 23 October 2019
- Constituency: Vienna

Personal details
- Born: 4 October 1982 (age 44)
- Party: The Greens

Meri Disoski (born 4 October 1982) is an Austrian politician of The Greens. She has been a member of the National Council since 2019, and has served as deputy group leader of The Greens since 2021. Disoski is their Spokesperson for Foreign and European Policy, Women, and Gender Equality.
