= Kai Jan Krainer =

Austrian politician (born 1968)

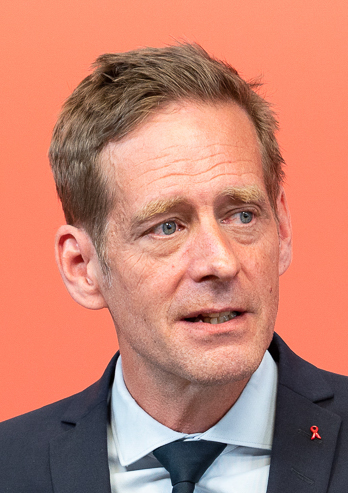
- Krainer in 2021

Member of the National Council
- Incumbent
- Assumed office 20 December 2002

Personal details
- Born: 9 September 1968 (age 57)
- Party: Social Democratic Party

Kai Jan Krainer (born 9 September 1968) is an Austrian politician of the Social Democratic Party. He has been a member of the National Council since 2002, and has served as deputy group leader of the Social Democratic Party since 2023.
