= Dagmar Belakowitsch-Jenewein =

Austrian politician (born 1968)

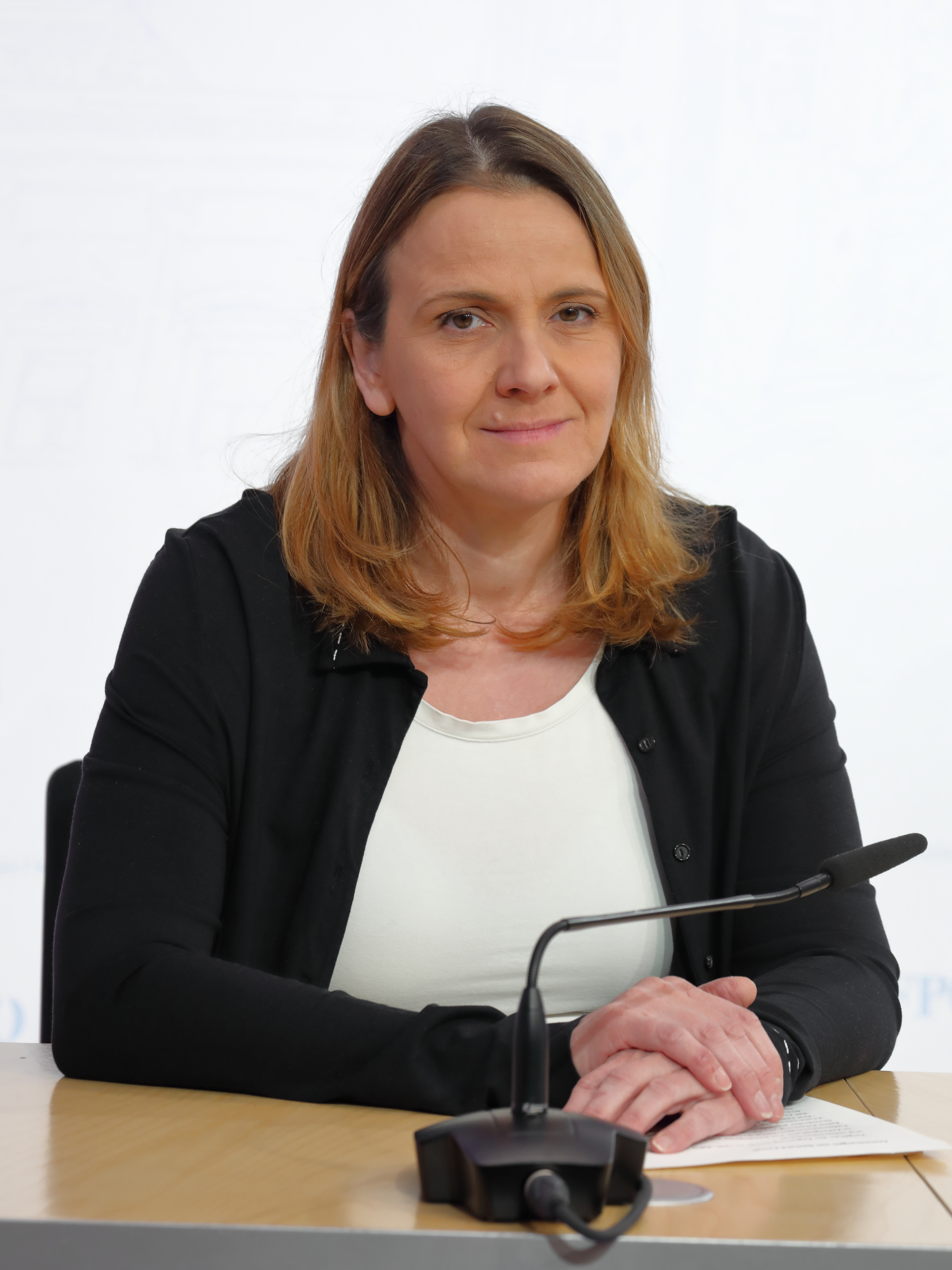

Member of the National Council
- Incumbent
- Assumed office 2006
- Constituency: 9 Wien

Personal details
- Born: 24 August 1968 (age 57)
- Party: Freedom Party of Austria
- Committees: Committee for Health Affairs

Dagmar Belakowitsch-Jenewein (born 24 August 1968 in Vienna) is an Austrian politician for the Freedom Party of Austria (FPÖ), currently serving as a Member of the Parliament of Austria, the National Council.

She studied medicine at the University of Vienna and the University of Graz, graduating as Dr. med. univ. She became a board member of the local party in Vienna in 2006, and was elected to the National Council the same year.

She is married and has a son.

Political offices
Preceded by	Member of the National Council of Austria; 2006–	Succeeded by
Preceded by Barbara Rosenkranz	Chair of Committee for Health Affairs of the National Council of Austria; 2008–	Incumbent
