= Josef Staribacher =

Austrian politician (1921 - 2014)

Josef Staribacher (25 March 1921 – 4 January 2014) was an Austrian politician.

Staribacher died of pneumonia on 4 January 2014 at the age of 92.
