= Manfred Srb =

Austrian politician (1941–2022)

Member of the Federal Council of Austria
- In office 17 December 1986 – 3 May 1994

Personal details
- Born: 5 June 1941 Stockerau, Ostmark, Germany
- Died: 8 January 2022 (aged 80)
- Party: The Greens – The Green Alternative

Manfred Srb (5 June 1941 – 8 January 2022) was an Austrian politician. A member of The Greens – The Green Alternative, he served in the Federal Council from 1986 to 1994. He died on 8 January 2022, at the age of 80.
