= Hans-Jörg Jenewein =

Austrian politician (born 1974)

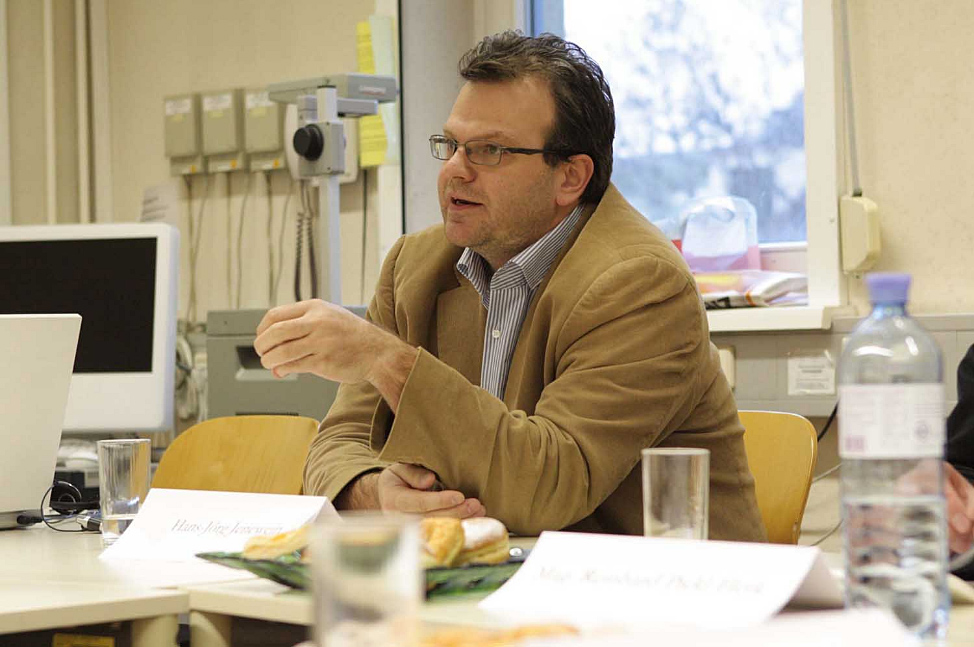

Member of the Federal Council

Personal details
- Born: 12 June 1974 (age 51)
- Party: Freedom Party of Austria

Hans-Jörg Jenewein (born 12 June 1974) is an Austrian politician who is currently a Member of the Federal Council for the Freedom Party of Austria (FPÖ).
