= Jessi Lintl =

Austrian politician (born 1956)

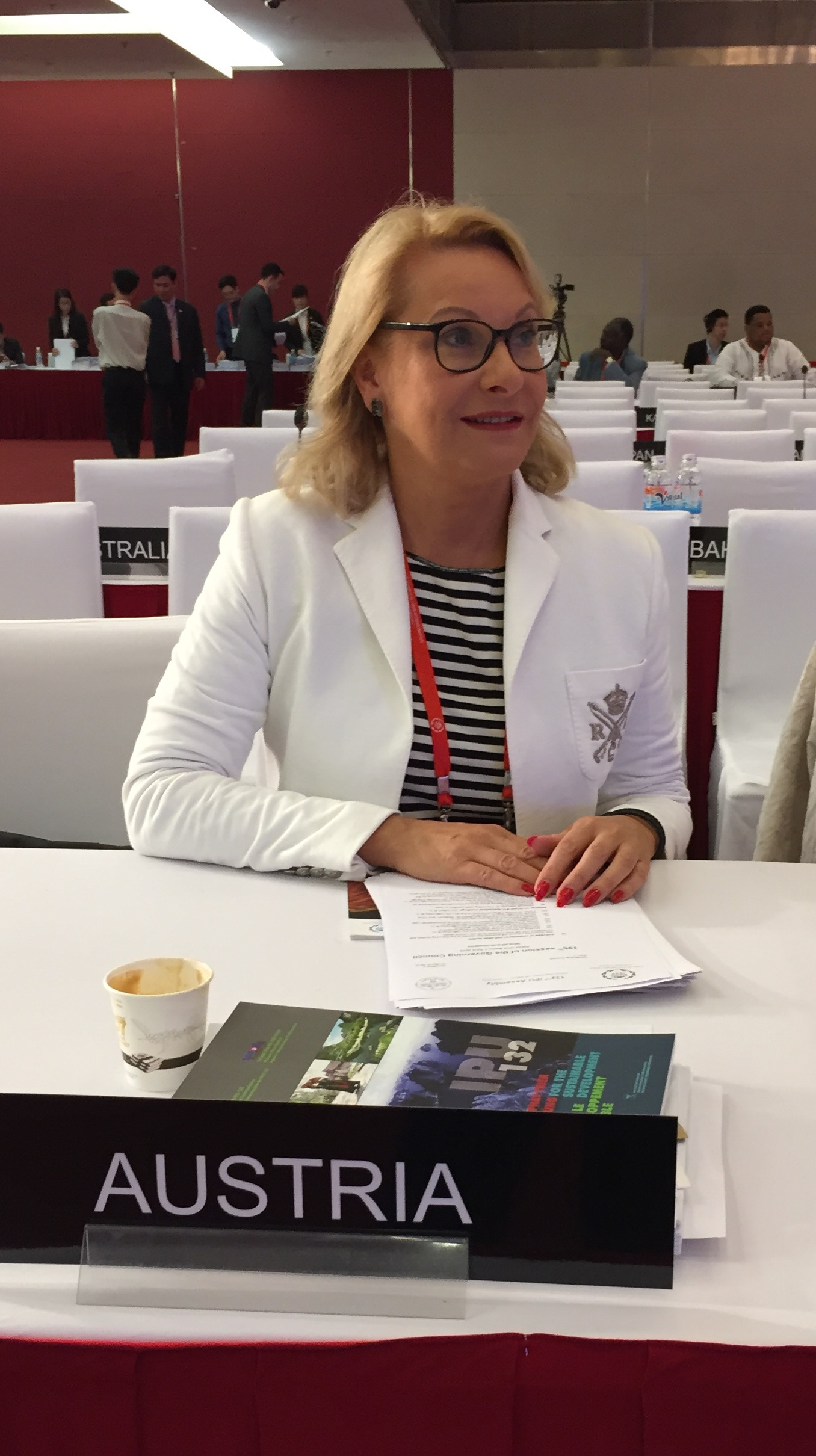

Member of the National Council
- Constituency: 9 Wien

Personal details
- Born: 30 June 1956 (age 69)
- Party: Freedom Party of Austria

Jessi Lintl (born 30 June 1956) is an Austrian politician who is a Member of the National Council for the Freedom Party of Austria (FPÖ).
