= Andreas Karlsböck =

Austrian politician (1960–2019)

Member of the National Council
- In office 28 October 2008 – 8 November 2017
- Constituency: 9D Wien Süd

Personal details
- Born: 18 November 1960 Vienna, Austria
- Died: 22 November 2019 (aged 59)
- Party: Freedom Party of Austria
- Education: University of Vienna

Andreas F. Karlsböck (18 November 1960 – 22 November 2019) was an Austrian politician. He was a Member of the National Council for the Freedom Party of Austria (FPÖ) from 2008 to 2017.

== Biography ==
Karlsböck was born on 18 November 1960 in Vienna where he was raised. In 1979, he entered the University of Vienna, where he studied medicine. He graduated in 1985 and went on to become a dental, oral and maxillofacial surgeon.

He joined the Freedom Party of Austria in 1992 and become a member of his district council in Vienna. In the 2008 Austrian legislative election, the FPÖ increased its representation in the National Council and Karlsböck won a seat in parliament.

Karlsböck was among several members of the FPÖ invited to the inauguration of President Donald Trump in 2017.

In 2016, the Vienna prosecutors opened an investigation of allegations that Karlsböck beat a woman with whom he had a relationship 20 to 30 times and holding a pillow over her face.

He left parliament after the 2017 Austrian legislative election. Although he had been re-elected, Karlsböck stepped down due to ill health. He had suffered from a serious illness since 2015. The disease recurred in 2017. Karlsböck died on 22 November 2019.
