= Thomas Schellenbacher =

Austrian politician (born 1964)

Member of the National Council
- Incumbent
- Assumed office 29 October 2013
- Constituency: 9 Wien

Personal details
- Born: 23 July 1964 (age 61)
- Party: Freedom Party of Austria

Thomas Schellenbacher (born 23 July 1964) is an Austrian politician who has been a Member of the National Council for the Freedom Party of Austria (FPÖ) since 2013.
