= 2019 Austrian legislative election =

- 29 September 2019

All 183 seats in the National Council 92 seats needed for a majority
- Opinion polls
- Turnout: 75.6% (▼4.4 pp)
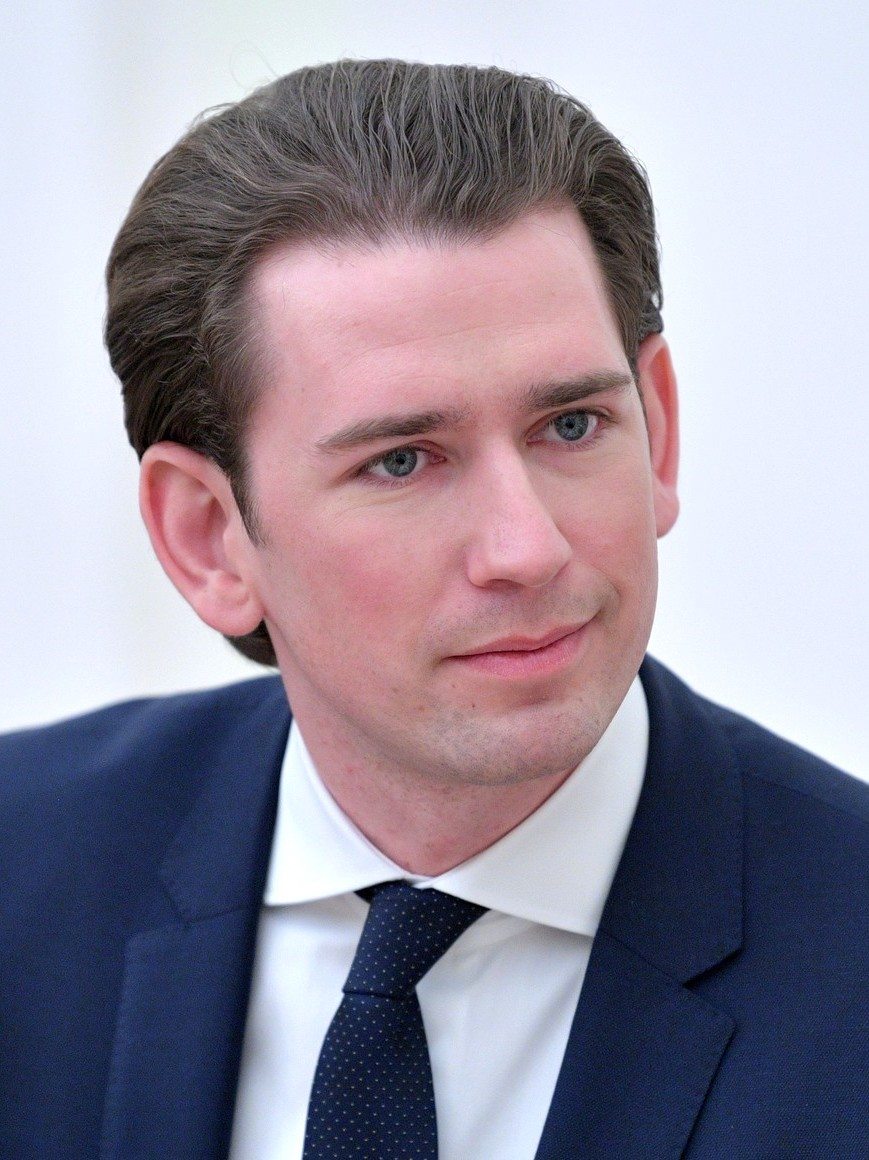

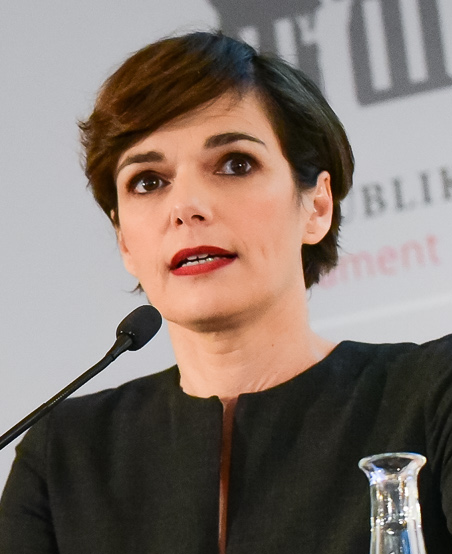

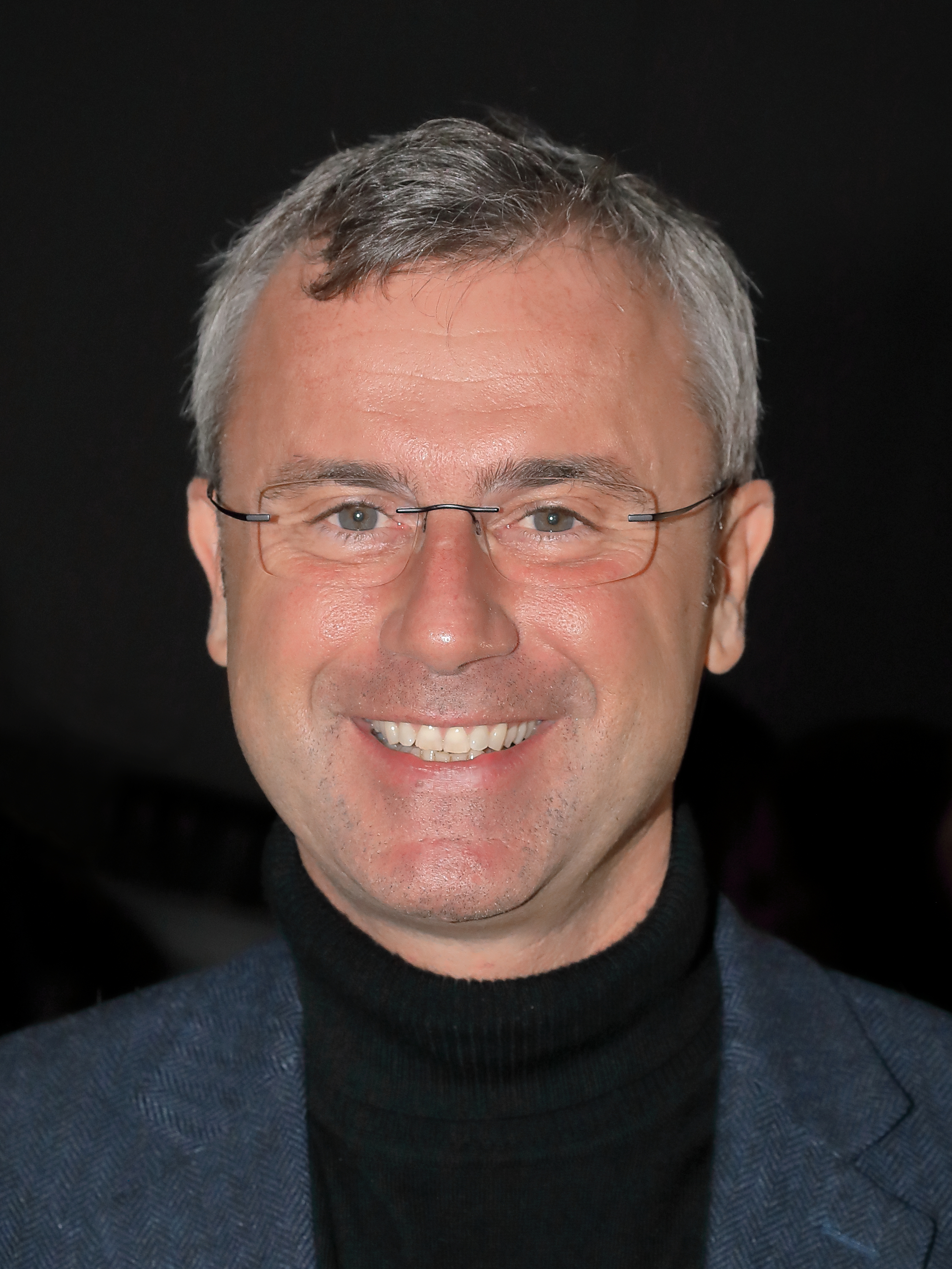

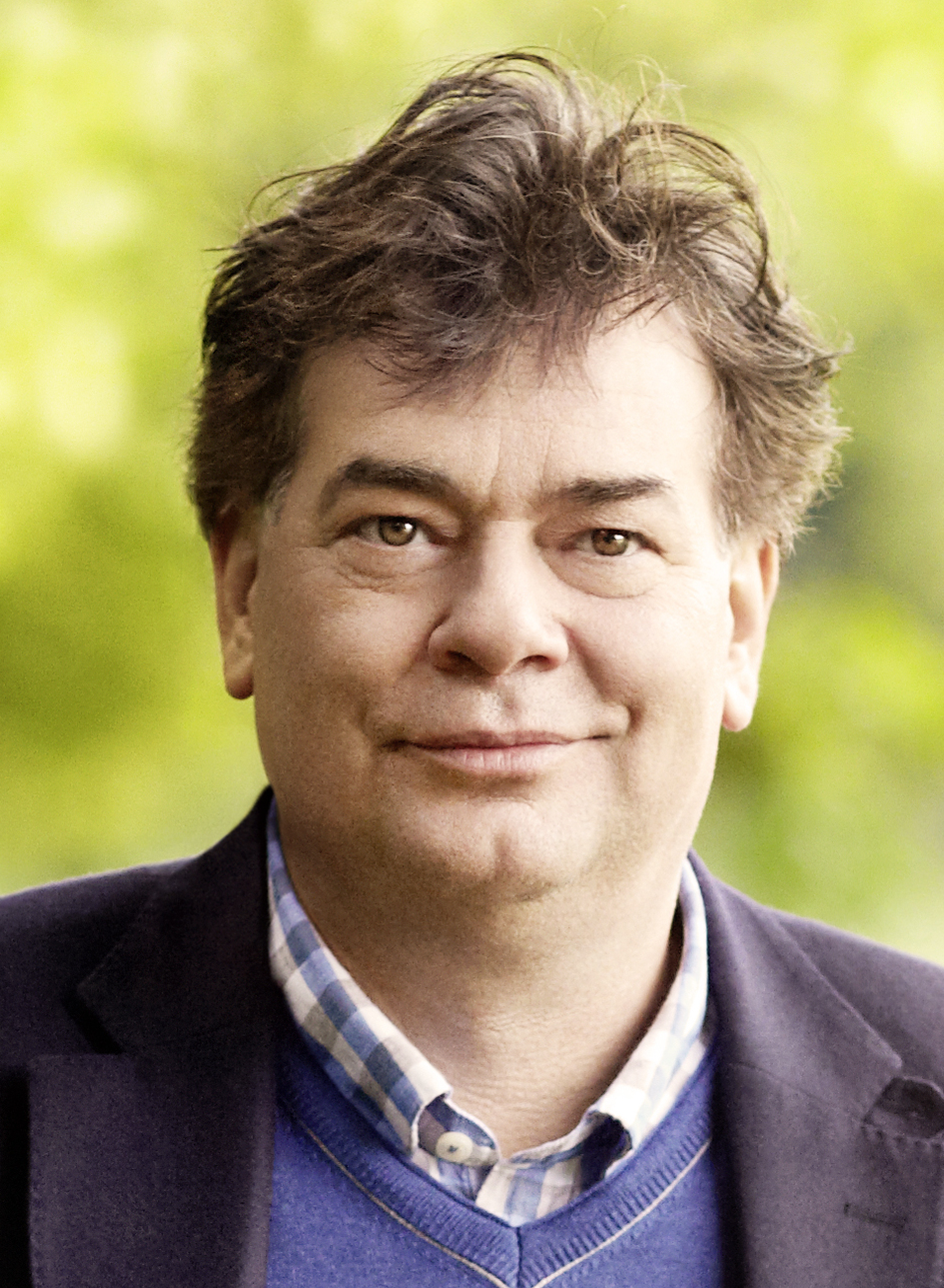

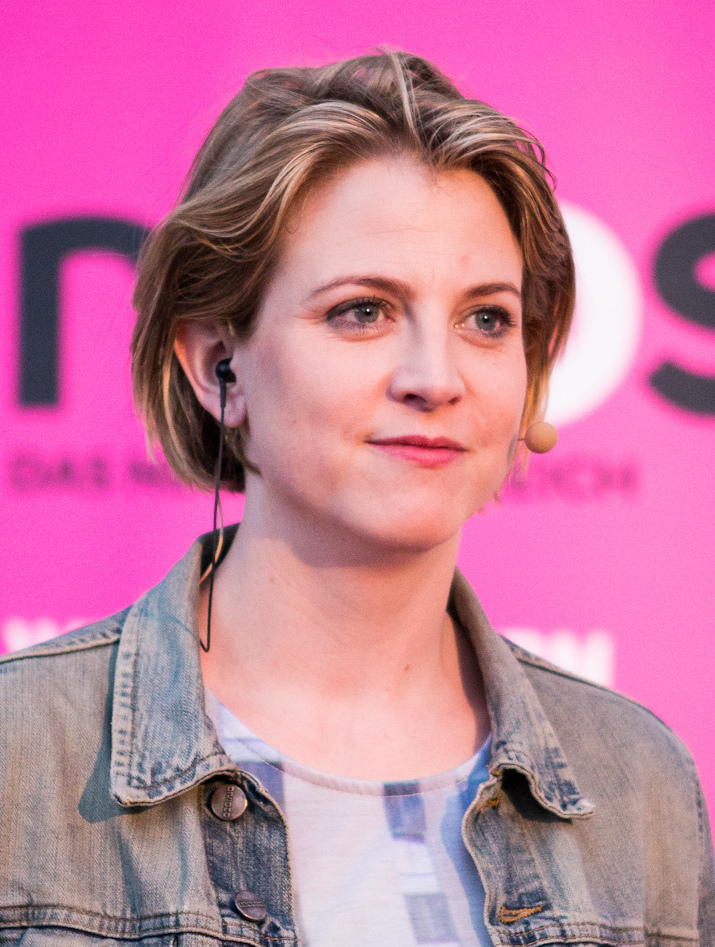
	First party	Second party	Third party
Leader	Sebastian Kurz	Pamela Rendi-Wagner	Norbert Hofer
Party	ÖVP	SPÖ	FPÖ
Last election	31.5%, 62 seats	26.9%, 52 seats	26.0%, 51 seats
Seats won	71	40	31
Seat change	▲9	▼12	▼20
Popular vote	1,789,417	1,011,868	772,666
Percentage	37.5%	21.2%	16.2%
Swing	▲6.0 pp	▼5.7 pp	▼9.8 pp
	Fourth party	Fifth party
Leader	Werner Kogler	Beate Meinl-Reisinger
Party	Greens	NEOS
Last election	3.8%, 0 seats	5.3%, 10 seats
Seats won	26	15
Seat change	▲26	▲5
Popular vote	664,055	387,124
Percentage	13.9%	8.1%
Swing	▲10.1 pp	▲2.8 pp
Chancellor before election
Brigitte Bierlein
Independent
Chancellor after election
Sebastian Kurz
ÖVP

Legislative elections were held in Austria on 29 September 2019 to elect the 27th National Council, the lower house of Austria's bicameral parliament. The snap election was called in the wake of the Ibiza affair in May, which caused the resignation of Vice Chancellor Heinz-Christian Strache and the collapse of the governing coalition of the Austrian People's Party (ÖVP) and Freedom Party of Austria (FPÖ). The government subsequently lost a motion of no confidence in parliament, before ÖVP Chancellor Sebastian Kurz was replaced by non-partisan Brigitte Bierlein on an interim basis.

The conservative ÖVP achieved its best result since 2002, improving its vote share six percentage points. The centre-left Social Democratic Party (SPÖ) won just 21.2%, its worst result in over a century. The FPÖ suffered a substantial loss of almost ten points. The Greens re-entered the National Council after falling out in 2017, and achieved their best ever result with 13.9% and 26 seats. NEOS improved from 2017, rising from 10 to 15 seats.

With the ÖVP in a clear position to lead the new government, it held talks with all other parties. By early November, a coalition with The Greens was seen as the most likely outcome. Negotiations continued through December, and on 1 January, ÖVP leader Kurz and Greens leader Werner Kogler announced the formation of a coalition government between their two parties. The government was sworn in on 7 January 2020 as Second Kurz government, with Sebastian Kurz returning as Chancellor and Kogler taking office as Vice Chancellor.

== Background ==
The 2017 legislative election was called four years into a grand coalition between the Social Democratic Party of Austria (SPÖ) and Austrian People's Party (ÖVP), prompted by the demand of newly elected ÖVP leader Sebastian Kurz for a snap election. Although the SPÖ won 52 seats, as it did in the 2013 election, the ÖVP and FPÖ both made large gains, increasing their strength by 15 seats to 62 and by 11 to 51, respectively, making the former the largest party at the federal level. The Peter Pilz List entered the National Council with 8 seats, while the NEOS gained one seat and the Greens lost all of their 24 seats because they failed to clear the 4% threshold of the vote, which is required to qualify for the proportional allocation of seats.

Following the election, President Alexander Van der Bellen asked Kurz to form the next government, and the ÖVP initiated exploratory talks with the other parties represented in the National Council. The ÖVP officially started coalition negotiations with the FPÖ on 25 October 2017, agreeing on a five-point roadmap. Negotiations drew towards a close in late November, and the parties announced a coalition agreement on 15 December, with the coalition government led by Kurz sworn in on 18 December.

On 4 November 2017 Peter Pilz announced that he would not take his seat, following accusations of sexual harassment. On 11 June 2018, Pilz returned to the National Council and was sworn in after charges of sexual harassment were dropped by the state prosecution. His return was made possible by the resignation of another member of the National Council, Peter Kolba, who stepped down after significant disputes within the List Pilz. The swearing-in ceremony of Pilz was met with heavy resistance. Almost all female representatives walked out of the parliament room as he was about to take the oath.

On 7 May 2018 Matthias Strolz announced that he would step down as leader of NEOS and hand over the party leadership in June, citing personal reasons and a successful period for the party since it was founded in 2012, with steady electoral gains during his term. On 23 June 2018, party delegates elected Beate Meinl-Reisinger as their new leader in a meeting that took place in Vienna.

On 20 August 2018 Maria Stern was elected new party leader of the List Pilz during a party meeting in Vienna. Participants also agreed to rename the list, for which a PR agency was hired. On 19 November 2018, the List Pilz presented their new name: "Jetzt" (or "Now", in English).

On 18 September 2018 opposition leader Christian Kern announced that he would resign as leader of the Austrian Social Democrats. Four days later, former Minister of Health Pamela Rendi-Wagner was designated as the new chairwoman of the Social Democratic Party. She was officially confirmed as party leader through a delegate vote at a party convention held on 24 November 2018. Rendi-Wagner is the first female leader of the SPÖ.

=== Ibiza affair and snap election announcement ===
On 17 May 2019 a secretly recorded video was published of a July 2017 meeting in Ibiza, Spain, which appeared to show the then opposition politicians Heinz-Christian Strache and Johann Gudenus discussing their party's underhanded practices and intentions. In the video, both politicians appeared receptive to proposals by a woman posing as the niece of a Russian oligarch, discussing providing the FPÖ positive news coverage in return for government contracts. Strache and Gudenus also hinted at corrupt political practices involving other wealthy donors to the FPÖ in Europe and elsewhere.

On 18 May Strache announced that he would resign as FPÖ leader and vice chancellor, with Norbert Hofer replacing him as FPÖ leader.

On 19 May Kurz tore up the coalition agreement and announced his intention to seek a snap election in September with President Alexander Van der Bellen also signalling an election early that month. Just eight days later, the Kurz government was toppled in the first successful no-confidence vote in modern Austrian history.

On 3 June Brigitte Bierlein and her independent technocratic interim government was sworn into office by President Alexander Van der Bellen. Her government consisted of 12 members, instead of the 16 in the first Kurz government.

On 12 June 2019 the election date was eventually set for 29 September with the votes of SPÖ and FPÖ, while the ÖVP was opposed, having favoured an early September poll date instead. The prevailing view was that the snap election should not be held during the summer holiday season, and that it should not coincide with state elections in Vorarlberg, to be held on 13 October 2019.

== Electoral system ==
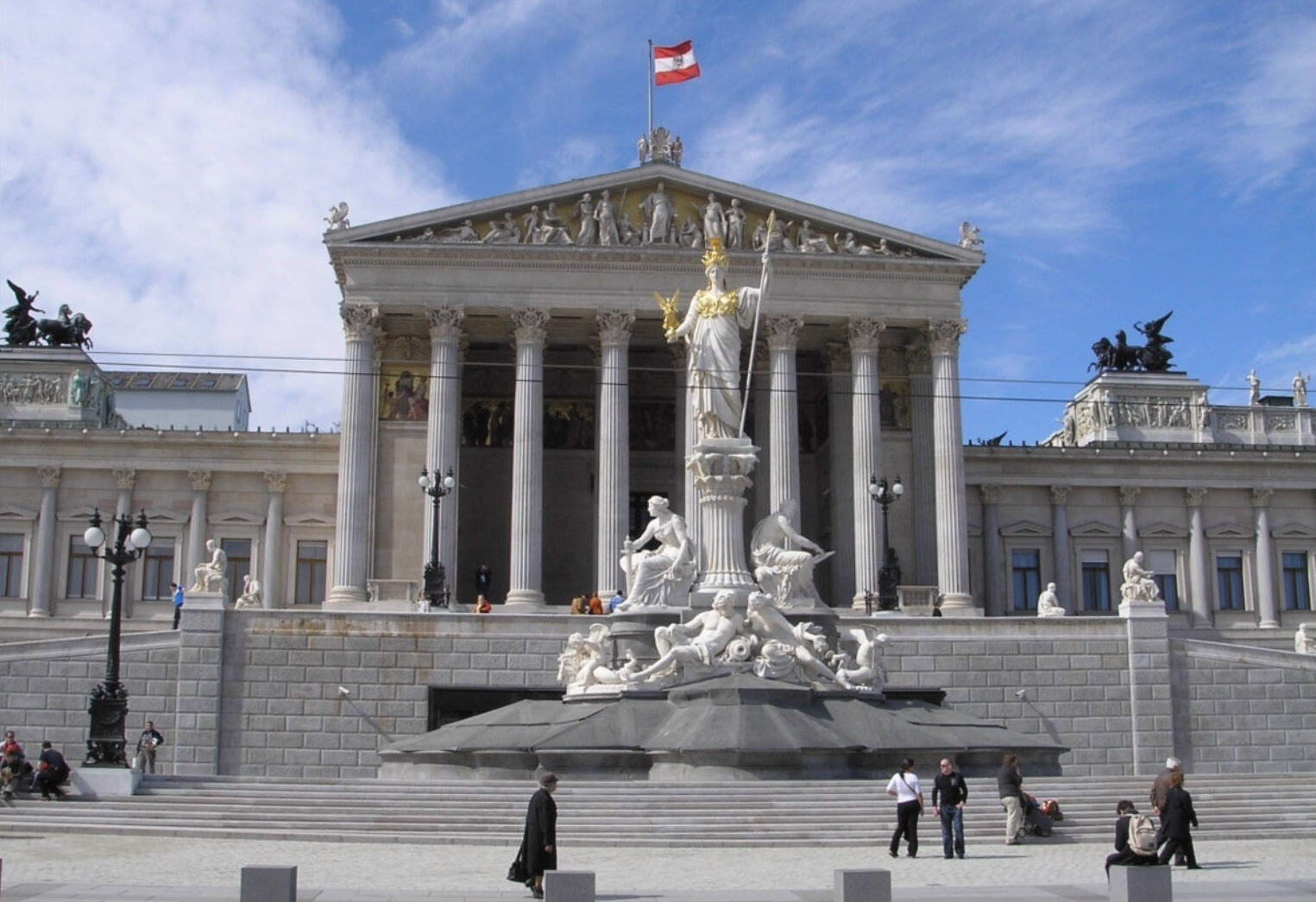
Austrian Parliament building (Vienna)

The 183 members of the National Council are elected by open list proportional representation at the level of one federal constituency consisting of all of Austria, 9 state constituencies, and 39 regional constituencies. Seats in the National Council are apportioned to the regional constituencies based on the results of the most recent census. Following elections, seats are allocated to the candidates of successful parties and lists in a three-stage process: from regional constituencies to state constituencies to the federal constituency.

For parties to receive any representation in the National Council, they must either win at least one seat in a constituency directly, or clear a 4 percent national electoral threshold. Seats are distributed according to the Hare method in the first two stages, at the level of regional and state constituencies, with any remaining seats allocated using the D'Hondt method at the federal level, to ensure overall proportionality between a party's national vote share and its share of parliamentary seats. Deviations from near-perfect proportionality can nevertheless occur when a smaller party fails to clear the 4% hurdle and receives no seats, a fate the Green Party suffered in 2017. The rationale for the threshold is to discourage parties from splintering, and thereby prevent parliament from fragmenting into numerous small parties, which would complicate coalition formation in the first instance, and would undermine their stability once they are formed.

In addition to voting for a political party, voters may cast three preferential votes for specific candidates of that party, but are not required to do so. These additional votes do not affect the proportional allocation based on the vote for the party or list, but can change the rank order of candidates on a party's lists at the federal, state, and regional level. The threshold to increase the position of a candidate on a federal party list is 7 percent, compared to 10 percent at the state level, and 14 percent at the regional level. The names of candidates on regional party lists are printed on the ballot and can be marked with an "x" to indicate the voter's preference. Preference votes for candidates on party lists at the state and federal level, however, must be written in by the voter, either by writing the name or the rank number of the candidate in a blank spot provided for that purpose. Austria still uses paper ballots, rather than electronic voting machines or online voting. Because the names of candidates on the regional lists are printed on the ballot, and because more parties and lists compete today than was the case in earlier decades of the Second Republic, today's ballots are much larger in size than was the case before the introduction of preferential voting. Voting by placing an "x" in the circle provided next to party name on the top of the ballot, or marking a specific candidate name on the regional list of a party at the bottom, is the most common method, but other markings other than "x" are also allowed. A voter may not cross party-lines to cast a preference vote for a candidate of another party, however. Such preference votes are invalid.

=== Date ===
Per Article 26 and 27 of the Federal Constitutional Law, the National Council must be convened by the President no later than 30 days after the most recent election. The standard duration of the legislative period of the National Council is five years, by the end of which it must be renewed through an election on a Sunday or a public holiday. Because the inaugural meeting of the 26th National Council took place on 9 November 2017, as determined by President Alexander Van der Bellen, the latest date on which the next legislative election could have been held would be 6 November 2022.

== Contesting parties ==
The table below lists parties represented in the 26th National Council.

Name		Ideology	Leader	2017 result	
Name		Ideology	Leader	Votes (%)	Seats
ÖVP	Austrian People's Party; Österreichische Volkspartei	Christian democracy Liberal conservatism	Sebastian Kurz	31.5%	62 / 183
SPÖ	Social Democratic Party of Austria; Sozialdemokratische Partei Österreichs	Social democracy	Pamela Rendi-Wagner	26.9%	52 / 183
FPÖ	Freedom Party of Austria; Freiheitliche Partei Österreichs	Right-wing populism Euroscepticism	Norbert Hofer	26.0%	51 / 183
NEOS	NEOS	Liberalism; Pro-Europeanism	Beate Meinl-Reisinger	5.3%	10 / 183
JETZT	JETZT; JETZT – Liste Pilz	Left-wing populism Green politics	Maria Stern (lead candidate: Peter Pilz)	4.4%	8 / 183

=== Ballot access requirements ===
In order to contest the election nationwide, a party (or list) must have the support of three members of parliament or collect 2,600 valid signatures from eligible voters ahead of the elections.

Parties may contest the election in individual states only, if they so chose. To do so, they must submit a minimum number of voter signatures that varies by state as follows:

- 100 – Burgenland, Vorarlberg
- 200 – Carinthia, Salzburg, Tyrol
- 400 – Styria, Upper Austria
- 500 – Lower Austria, Vienna

For the 2019 elections, parties had less than a month (9 July and 2 August) to collect signatures. The state and federal election commissions then validated the signatures and announced the list of parties that qualified.

=== Parties that collected enough signatures ===
In addition to the parties already represented in the National Council, eight parties collected enough signatures to be placed on the ballot. Three of these were cleared to be on the ballot in all states, five of them only in some.

On the ballot in all 9 states

- The Greens (GRÜNE)
- Communist Party of Austria Plus (KPÖ)
- The Change (WANDL)

On the ballot in some states only

- Austrian Beer Party (BIER) – on the ballot only in Vienna
- BZÖ Carinthia – Alliance of Patriots (BZÖ) – on the ballot only in Carinthia
- Christian Party of Austria (CPÖ) – on the ballot only in the Burgenland
- Every Vote Counts! (GILT) – on the ballot only in Tyrol and Vorarlberg
- Socialist Left Party (SLP) – on the ballot only in Upper Austria

=== Failed to achieve ballot access ===
Another eight parties or lists sought ballot access, but failed to collect enough signatures to meet the 2 August 2019 deadline.

- Party for Children and Humanity (ARGUS)
- Democratic Alternative (DA)
- New Era Movement (LIEBE)
- People's Veto - You have the right to say NO! (NEIN!)
- Platform for Homeland & Environment, Neutrality and Direct Democracy (participating parties: NFÖ and IHU, formerly EUAUS) (ÖXIT)
- Die PARTEI (PARTEI), Austrian branch of the identically named German party
- Austrian Alternative (VOLG)
- Electoral Alliance Austria (wählÖ)

== Opinion polls ==
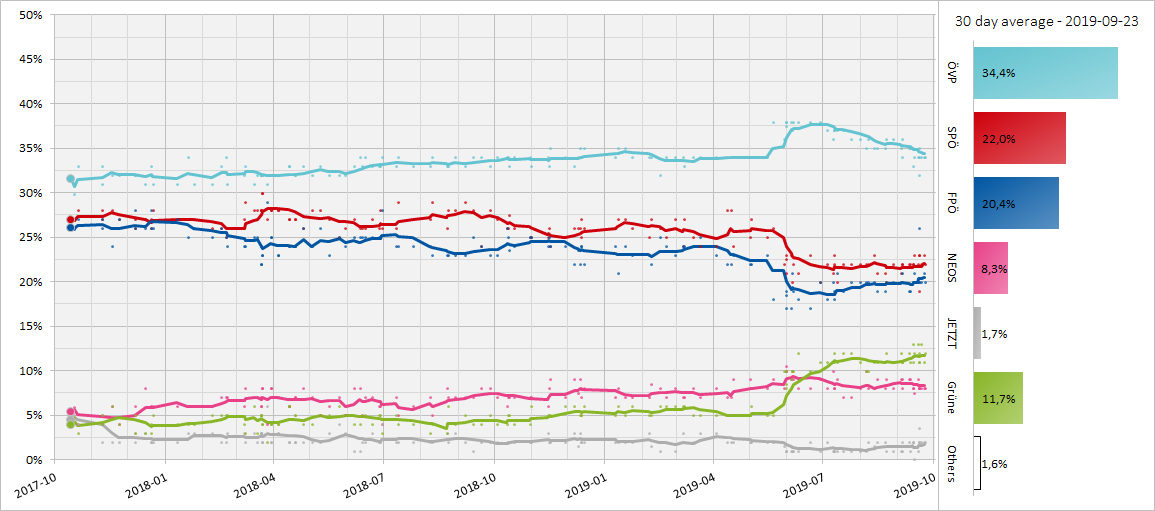

== Results ==
Party	Votes	%	Seats	+/–
Austrian People's Party	1,789,417	37.46	71	+9
Social Democratic Party of Austria	1,011,868	21.18	40	–12
Freedom Party of Austria	772,666	16.17	31	–20
The Greens	664,055	13.90	26	+26
NEOS	387,124	8.10	15	+5
JETZT – Pilz List	89,169	1.87	0	–8
KPÖ Plus	32,736	0.69	0	0
Der Wandel	22,168	0.46	0	New
Beer Party	4,946	0.10	0	New
Every Vote Counts!	1,767	0.04	0	0
BZÖ Carinthia – Alliance of Patriots	760	0.02	0	New
Socialist Left Party	310	0.01	0	0
Christian Party of Austria	260	0.01	0	0
Total	4,777,246	100.00	183	0
Valid votes	4,777,246	98.80		
Invalid/blank votes	58,223	1.20		
Total votes	4,835,469	100.00		
Registered voters/turnout	6,396,812	75.59		
Source: Interior Ministry

=== Results by state ===
==== Vote share ====
State	ÖVP	SPÖ	FPÖ	Grüne	NEOS	PILZ	Others	Turnout
Burgenland	38.3	29.4	17.3	8.1	4.9	1.3	0.8	81.4
Carinthia	34.9	26.2	19.8	9.5	6.8	1.7	1.1	72.4
Lower Austria	42.3	19.9	16.4	11.0	7.7	1.7	1.0	80.6
Upper Austria	36.8	22.1	17.5	13.7	7.3	1.5	1.1	77.7
Salzburg	46.4	16.4	13.7	12.6	8.4	1.4	1.1	76.4
Styria	38.9	19.2	18.5	13.0	7.1	1.7	1.7	74.8
Tyrol	45.8	13.0	14.7	14.7	8.9	1.7	1.2	71.8
Vorarlberg	36.6	13.1	14.7	18.1	13.6	2.1	1.7	67.7
Vienna	24.6	27.1	12.8	20.7	9.9	3.0	1.9	72.0
Austria	37.5	21.2	16.2	13.9	8.1	1.9	1.3	75.6
Source: Austrian Interior Ministry

==== Seats ====
State	ÖVP	SPÖ	FPÖ	Grüne	NEOS	PILZ	Others	Total	Turnout
Burgenland	2	2	1	0	0	0	0	5	81.4
Carinthia	4	3	2	1	0	0	0	10	72.4
Lower Austria	15	7	6	4	2	0	0	34	80.6
Upper Austria	11	7	5	4	2	0	0	29	77.7
Salzburg	5	1	1	1	1	0	0	10	76.4
Styria	10	5	4	3	1	0	0	23	74.8
Tyrol	6	1	2	2	1	0	0	12	71.8
Vorarlberg	2	1	1	1	1	0	0	6	67.7
Vienna	8	8	4	6	3	0	0	29	72.0
Austria	71	40	31	26	15	0	0	183	75.59

=== Preference votes ===
Alongside votes for a party, voters were able to cast a preferential votes for a candidate on the party list. The ten candidates with the most preferential votes on a federal level were as follows:

Party	Pos.	Candidate	Votes	%
ÖVP	1	Sebastian Kurz	155,803	83.9
FPÖ	2	Herbert Kickl	75,699	64.4
FPÖ	1	Norbert Hofer	30,502	25.9
SPÖ	1	Pamela Rendi-Wagner	26,875	30.9
GRÜNE	1	Werner Kogler	25,789	45.7
NEOS	1	Beate Meinl-Reisinger	15,435	60.5
SPÖ	134	Tarik Mete	15,382	17.7
ÖVP	2	Elisabeth Köstinger	7,617	4.9
JETZT	1	Peter Pilz	4,277	45.4
SPÖ	7	Elisabeth Herr	3,675	4.2

=== Maps ===
Map showing the largest party on the state level

Map showing the results of the election on the sub-constituency level

Map showing the largest party on the district level

Map showing the largest party on the municipal level

== Government formation ==
Although the ÖVP under Sebastian Kurz won a large plurality, it came up 21 seats short of a majority and thus needed the support of a junior partner in order to return Kurz to the chancellorship. Several coalition options were mathematically possible based on the distribution of parliamentary seats among the other parties, which reflected their respective shares of the vote. The Green Party achieved their best electoral results ever, in part at the expense of the SPÖ, and was viewed as a potentially viable coalition partner, although such a conservative-green alliance would have unprecedented at the national level in Austria and would have required compromise on policy positions by both sides.

=== Exploratory coalition talks ===
President Van der Bellen met with Kurz on Monday, 7 October 2019 to charge him with the task of forming a new government. Kurz had committed himself to hold talks with all parties. The Green Party leadership had already voted in favor of exploratory talks, and had avoided setting preconditions, though as of 29 September, a coalition with the ÖVP was backed by only 1/3 of Green party members. The Green Party leader, Werner Kogler, is a veteran of coalition talks with the ÖVP that failed on an earlier occasion after the 2002 election. However, 4 in 10 ÖVP voters prefer FPÖ, whereas only 1 in 5 could imagine cooperation with the Green Party. The party leaders of SPÖ, FPÖ and NEOS also agreed to take part in the exploratory talks, which are the first step to form a new government.

After the conclusion of the first round of talks, the FPÖ told Kurz that they would not continue the exploratory talks, but would consider re-entering negotiations should talks with other parties fail. Another round of exploratory talks with SPÖ, the Greens, and NEOS was then scheduled for Thursday, 17 October and Friday, 18 October.

=== State elections in Vorarlberg ===
Meanwhile, regional elections to the state legislature were held in Vorarlberg, Austria's westernmost constituent Bundesland (state) on 13 October 2019. The outcome of the election to this state legislature was closely watched because it came on the heels of the National Council elections, and because the state had already established a precedent for a workable conservative-green coalition government at the sub-national level in the previous election cycle. Based on the final election results, all parties represented in the Vorarlberg state legislature increased their share of the vote - except for the scandal-plagued FPÖ, which sustained heavy losses, just as it did in the national parliamentary elections two weeks earlier. With 18.9% of the vote, the Greens emerged as the second-largest party after the ÖVP, which garnered 43.5%. Based on the final election results, four parties represented in the 36-seat state legislature prior to the election gained one additional seat each, all at the expense of the FPÖ, which lost four. As is the case at the federal level, coalition talks were held to determine the composition of the new government. A renewal of the ÖVP-Green coalition was the most likely outcome after Governor Markus Wallner (ÖVP) invited the Greens once again to in-depth talks following a round of talks with other party leaders. The coalition negotiations between ÖVP and Greens were finalized on 5 November 2019, and the new Vorarlberg government was sworn in on 6 November.

Kurz set a deadline for 8 November for exploratory talks with the Greens to end. Previously, SPÖ and NEOS broke off talks with Kurz and told him they are only available for direct coalition talks. Kurz then agreed to schedule four more rounds of in-depth exploratory talks with the Green Party and told the media that he plans a decision about formal coalition talks for the days after 8 November.

After the final round of talks between ÖVP and Greens on 8 November, the Greens announced a party meeting for Sunday, 10 November and scheduled a subsequent vote on the approval of coalition talks with the ÖVP. Kurz announced that he would talk with key ÖVP party members, such as state governors, over the weekend and await a decision by the Greens before announcing his own decision. According to a poll by broadcaster ATV, published on 8 November, public support for a ÖVP-Green coalition increased to 55%, with 36% opposed. Among Green Party voters only, support rose to 96%, while among ÖVP voters only, 61% supported such a coalition, with 33% opposed. Support was also high among voters from the liberal NEOS (79%) and the SPÖ (68%), with opposition only coming from the FPÖ (71%).

=== Formal coalition negotiations at the federal level ===
After conferring with numerous ÖVP leaders around the country by phone over the weekend, Kurz announced his party's unity in favor of formal coalition negotiations with the Greens, rather than with the Social Democrats. He cited government stability as a key consideration for the choice, but cautioned that the outcome was still uncertain. Although unprecedented in Austria at the federal level, the idea of a coalition between the Christian-Democrats with the Greens was disproportionately favored by voters under 30 in both parties. Austria's younger generation has greater political clout than elsewhere because the voting age was lowered to 16, thus increasing their demographic share of the electorate. Born in 1986, Sebastian Kurz himself was one of the youngest heads of government on a global level when he first became Federal Chancellor in 2017.

A Kurz-Kogler meeting was scheduled for Tuesday morning, 12 November 2019. Green leaders had unanimously approved opening coalition negotiations at a party meeting on Sunday. Kogler was quoted as saying that "our hand is extended to the ÖVP" but acknowledged that this undertaking had its risks. Major topics on which the two ideologically disparate parties had to strive to reach common ground are migration (refugees/immigration/integration), education, the economy, and transparency in government.

President Van der Bellen and NEOS welcomed the breakthrough announced by Kurz Monday morning, while the FPÖ criticized him for "delivering Austria to the Greens". The SPÖ called for government formation to finish quickly. Kurz had not offered any particular reason why a coalition with the SPÖ had been rejected.

The prospect of Austria being governed by a coalition of conservatives and greens was a novel development on the western European political landscape at a national level, and was watched with anticipation from the outside.

On 15 November, ÖVP and Greens decided to create a negotiation team of more than 100 people combined, to negotiate in 6 major groups and 36 sub-groups, discussing different policy areas and issues. Group leaders from the two parties were named to oversee the comprehensive talks, which started on Monday, 18 November, involving all sub-groups.

On 17 November, Hofer indicated he would say yes to a coalition agreement with Kurz.

=== State elections in Styria ===
On Sunday, 24 November 2019, legislative elections were held in Styria, Austria's fourth-largest state by population. The ÖVP won a resounding victory at the expense of both the Social Democrats and the FPÖ, which had done very well in the Styrian election of 2015. The ÖVP managed to re-establish itself as the historically dominant political force in the state. The Greens exceeded 10% of the vote statewide for the first time in history. With 6% the Communists did better than the NEOS who received 5%, but the NEOS had ground to celebrate nonetheless because they won enough votes to enter the Landtag for the first time, and with two seats.

Based on preliminary data reported as of 1700 on polling day, the breakdown by party is as follows: ÖVP 36.61% - SPÖ 22.89% - FPÖ 17.94% - GRÜNE 11.43% - KPÖ 6.02% - NEOS 5.10%. The Greens did exceptionally well in Graz, Styria's capital, which is also the stronghold of the Communist Party, a unique facet in Styrian politics.

Styria uses a slightly different version of PR to convert vote shares into seats than is used for elections to the national parliament. There is no 4% threshold. Instead, a party must win at least one seat (Grundmandat) by meeting a certain numerical requirement (Wahlzahl). Rather than being fixed, the number of votes necessary to meet this quota varies because it is computed based on all valid ballots cast in a district and the number of mandates allocated to that district. For the purpose of Landtag elections, Styria is divided into four districts (Wahlkreise) of unequal size, to which mandates (corresponding to seats in the Landtag) are apportioned based on the most recent census. The number of mandates per district is known going into the election, but the Wahlzahl is not known because it is affected by turnout, which this time was low by historical standards. As in national elections, the voting age is 16. Austria is an international outlier in giving youth in 16-18 age range the right to vote, and thus a stake in the political game and an ability to help shape their country's future. Voting used to be compulsory in several states, including, Styria, but that is no longer the case.

At the end of election day, the provisional distribution of seats in the 48-seat Landtag was projected as follows: ÖVP 18 seats (+4), SPÖ 12 (-3), FPÖ 8 (-6), GRÜNE 6 (+3), KPÖ 2 (no change), NEOS 2 (+2). After all ballots were counted (including postal votes and those cast by voters outside their precincts using a voting card available for that purpose) one mandate that was projected for the Communists shifted to the SPÖ, whose leader had already resigned, following his party's sharp drop in voter support. The Communists and the Neos accordingly received two seats each. Each won one basic mandate in the regional district that includes Graz, the capital, and a second one by aggregating their statewide votes. The Greens won five basic mandates outright, three of them in the Graz district, and received one more in the second stage of the seat-allocation process, bringing their total of 6, thereby doubling their strength in the Landtag. The turnout in this election was 64.5%, the lowest in history. As a result of the large shifts in voter support among the parties, the constellation of power in Styria came to mirror that at the federal level: Multiple variants of possible coalitions led by the ÖVP as the leading party were possible, but a coalition government with the Greens as a junior coalition partner would have required the inclusion of a third small party.

While coalition negotiations between the ÖVP and the Greens were continuing at the federal level, they were concluded in Styria in only three weeks. On Monday, 16 December 2019, ÖVP and SPÖ presented an agreement for a joint government dubbed „Koalition weiß-grün“ (White-Green Coalition), which eschewed reference to the two parties' traditional political colors (black and red, respectively). The newly formed coalition was also promoted as a "Partnership for Reform" and a "Partnership for the Future."

Notwithstanding the novel branding, this pact was a new edition of a conventional "grand coalition" between Austria's traditional center-right and center-left parties. Reflecting the ÖVP election win, the new government was led by Hermann Schützenhöfer (ÖVP) as Governor. Anton Lang (SPÖ) was the deputy governor. Because of the shift in respective electoral support for the two parties, the ÖVP had one more seat in the provincial government, filled by ex-minister Juliane Bogner-Strauß.

The Styrian Landtag met on Tuesday, 17 December, for its inaugural session. The immediate task of the re-constituted body consisted of electing its three presiding officers (one each from the three largest parties), installing in the new state government pursuant to the coalition agreement, and designating Styria's nine representatives in the Bundesrat, the upper chamber of Austria's bicameral national parliament.

=== ÖVP-Green coalition agreement reached by party negotiating teams and leaders ===
On 29 December the ÖVP and the Greens informed the media that their coalition negotiations are close to coming to fruition. This followed a series of one-on-one talks between Kurz and Kogler that continued over the weekend and into the new week, with a few details remaining to be worked out. Prospective ministers were to pay courtesy calls to federal president Van der Bellen, who wished to confer with each one of them prior to them being sworn in. The public presentation of the coalition government was expected as early as 2 January 2020. According to the Salzburger Nachrichten, the post of ministers of the Interior, Foreign Relations, Finances, Economy, Instruction and Agriculture will be given to ÖVP members, while the posts of ministers of Infrastructures, Environment, Justice, Health and Social Affairs will go to the Greens.

The coalition agreement on a joint government program and on the allocation of ministerial portfolios must, however, be approved by the rank and file of the Green party at a national party congress (Bundeskongress) called for that purpose, in keeping with the party's commitment to Basisdemokratie, which can be translated as bottom-up or grassroots democracy, here as an organizational principle within the party. The invitation to the Congress was delivered by email shortly before midnight on Saturday. The party's internal rules required at least one week notice, and the delegates had yet to see the full text of the coalition agreement on which they were to vote. Therefore, the party's ratification of the negotiated coalition agreement through its 276 delegates at the party congress could not take place until 4 January 2020. The earliest swearing-in date could have been 7 January 2020 because the Monday the 6th is a national holiday in Austria. Even if approval was likely, the Green Party Congress (dubbed BuKo) was to give an idea of how unified the party is, and whether internal fissures will jeopardize its leadership's role and effectiveness as junior partner in the anticipated ÖVP–Green coalition government, the first of its kind at the federal level.

On New Year's Day, 22:00 local time, in a joint televised appearance, Sebastian Kurz and Werner Kogler announced the successful conclusion of their coalition talks and formation of a new joint government, with the formal government program to be released on 2 January. They complimented each other and thanked Austrians for their patience. Between them, the two parties had 97 seats, a five-seat majority.

Kurz said a very good result had been achieved; not just a deal based on the least common denominator. He again stressed that two parties had received their respective mandates from the voters for different reasons: Tax relief and a hard line against illegal immigration and "political Islam" in the case of the ÖVP; the imperative to fight climate change in the case of the Greens. Kogler acknowledged that the negotiations were not easy, given the different orientations and policy positions of the two parties, and expressed a commitment to assume governing responsibility for the entirety of the Austrian "population", rather than just those who had voted Green or those who possess the right to vote. That larger constituency includes children and noncitizens. By expressing support for social policies to address child poverty and the challenges of other socially disadvantaged groups, such as the elderly, Kogler reaffirmed that the Green party stands for more than the environmental agenda. Also invoked was another core issue associated with the Green Party: Transparenz. While this is easily translated as transparency, it is a somewhat more expansive concept in Austrian political discourse that encompasses open government, freedom of information, ethics in public life, and the fight against corruption. The need for the latter was highlighted by the Ibiza affair that precipitated the fall of the previous coalition (Kurz Government I) and necessitated premature national elections in 2019, following a vote of no-confidence in the National Council.

The joint announcement also paid homage to the idea that policymaking need not be a zero-sum game, and that the parties' divergent policy goals and priorities with respect to tax relief and environmental policy measures can be reconciled and pursued through compromise, with due consideration of their disparate impact on different income strata in the population, and ameliorative policy measures (Sozialausgleich). Kurz made an analogous point about protecting the country's border (ÖVP priority) and protecting the environment (Green priority).

Kogler echoed President van der Bellen's message of national unity by quoting him for the proposition that "if you love your country, you don't split it."

The joint announcement was brief and cordial. No mention was made of a carbon tax or any specific policy measures or of the allocation of portfolios in the new government, at least half of which are expected to be assumed by women. No questions were entertained from members of the media.

=== Green Party Congress ratifies coalition pact ===
On 4 January 2020, a national party convention cleared the way for the Greens to share governing power with the conservatives New People's Party (ÖVP) in a Kurz-Kogler Cabinet, to be sworn in next week.

276 Green Party delegates from across the country met in Salzburg for a party congress required by the party's charter to formally approve the party's participation with the ÖVP on the terms spelled out in the coalition pact hammered out by Kurz and Kogler, and their respective negotiating teams, over the course of three month following the snap elections of 2019. The vote, taken on the open floor by show of hands with voting cards, was overwhelmingly in favor: 205 votes out of 220 (or 93.18%), with only 15 voting against.

The floor vote followed an open-mic session in which speakers had two minutes each to make statements, which some delegates used to voice criticism about the party having made too many concessions on core Green principles and positions, such as with respect to expansion of police powers and pretrial detention of persons deemed public security risks, and policies that reflect a contempt for human rights. Lack of progress on the issue of non-discrimination against homosexuals was also invoked as a reason to oppose the alliance with the Conservatives.

A motion for a secret convention vote was resoundingly rejected.

The designation of the five Greens to assume positions in the new Government—a selection that had been made and approved unanimously by the party's expanded executive committee—was put to a convention floor vote separately, and received near-unanimous approval with 99.25% of the votes, with only one No vote and one abstention. Among the Green members of the new Government is a former refugee from Bosnia, who will head the ministry of justice.

=== Swearing-in of the new government ===
On Tuesday, 7 January 2020, President Van der Bellen swore in the new ÖVP-Green government at the Hofburg (11 a.m. local time).

=== First state elections following formation of ÖVP–Green coalition ===
Regional elections for the Landtag of Burgenland, Austria's easternmost and least populous state, were held on 26 January 2020, and yielded an unexpected outcome: An absolute majority for the Social Democrats (SPÖ), who had governed the State in a coalition with the FPÖ. Both parties are currently in opposition to the ÖVP-Green coalition government at the national level. The Burgenland elections were called ahead of schedule, following the Ibiza affair. Both FPÖ and SPÖ suffered major setbacks in the national parliamentary elections of 2019 and in the 2019 Landtag elections in neighboring Styria, but nevertheless became the junior partner in an ÖVP-SPÖ coalition there. Burgenland uses a more personalized election system for Land election in which a preference vote for a candidate trumps the vote for a party list, with a 4% threshold to keep out the smallest parties. Of the six lists that competed, two did not surpass the threshold, including the NEOS.

According to preliminary results, the SPÖ garnered close to 50% of the votes, which translates into a majority in the provincial legislature, making a coalition with another party unnecessary. SPÖ leader and incumbent Governor Hans Peter Doskozil had steered pragmatic course, focusing on traditional Socialist objectives, such as higher wages, and had taken a more restrictive stance on immigration than the national SPÖ. He succeeded in his bid to demonstrate that the SPÖ is still capable of winning elections if it stays attuned to what the people want. Doskozil benefited from high personal popularity and from the "Governor-bonus" despite being handicapped in his re-election campaigning by a subdued voice related to vocal cord problems.

The New ÖVP received 30.6% of the vote while support for the FPÖ dropped to 9.7%. The Greens held steady with 6.5% but performed worse than had been projected. Seventy-five percent of the 250,181 registered voters turned out. Commentators and pundits expected that the SPÖ's overwhelming victory under Doskozil in Burgenland would have repercussions for the SPÖ at the national level, both with respect to the composition of its leadership, and the party's search for its place in Austria's evolving political landscape.

== See also ==
- List of members of the 27th National Council of Austria
