= Opinion polling for the 2019 Austrian legislative election =

In the run-up to the 2019 Austrian legislative election, various organisations carry out opinion polling to gauge voting intentions in Austria. Results of such polls are displayed in this list.

The date range for these opinion polls are from the previous legislative election, held on 15 October 2017, to the 2019 election, held on 29 September.

== Graphical summary ==
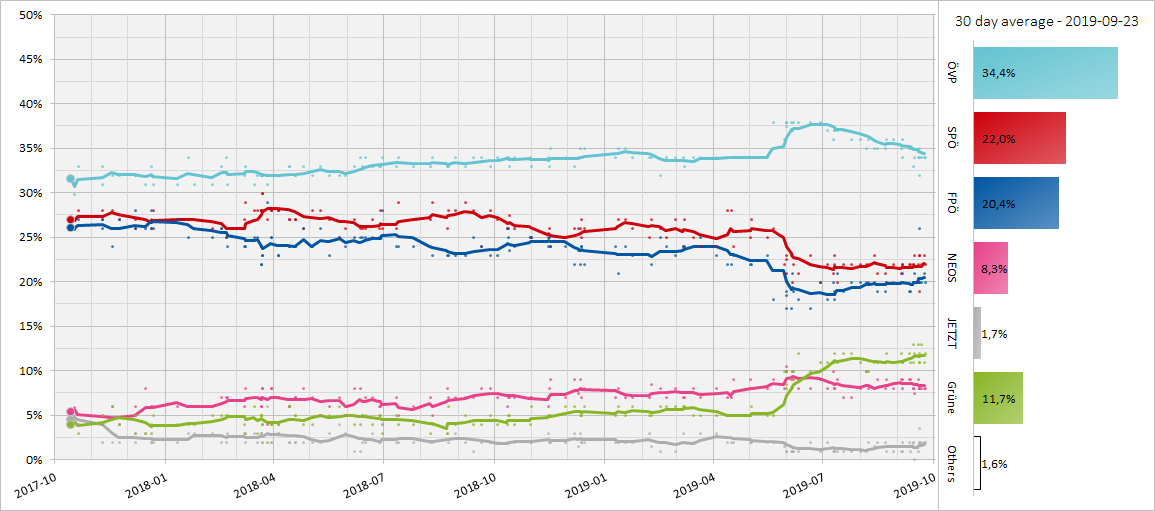

== Poll results ==
Polling firm	Fieldwork date	Sample size	ÖVP	SPÖ	FPÖ	NEOS	JETZT	Grüne	Others	Lead
2019 legislative election	29 Sep 2019	–	37.5	21.2	16.2	8.1	1.9	13.9	1.3	16.3
OGM	16–23 Sep 2019	1,006	34	22	20	8	2	12	2	12
Research Affairs	19–22 Sep 2019	1,000	34	23	21	8	2	11	1	11
Peter Hajek	12–20 Sep 2019	3,021	34	22	20	8	2	13	1	12
Market	16–18 Sep 2019	806	35	23	20	8	2	11	1	12
Research Affairs	13–18 Sep 2019	1,000	34	23	20	8	2	12	1	11
Karmasin	11–17 Sep 2019	3,000	34	22	20	9	1	13	1	12
OGM	6–13 Sep 2019	2,167	35	22	20	8	2	11	2	13
Unique Research	2–13 Sep 2019	2,402	33	22	20	8	2	13	2	11
Research Affairs	6–11 Sep 2019	511	35	22	19	9	1	11	3	13
Karmasin	5–10 Sep 2019	3,000	35	22	19	9	2	12	1	13
Market (Weekend)	5–8 Sep 2019	803	34	22	21	10	2	10	1	12
Market	2–4 Sep 2019	800	34	22	21	9	2	11	1	12
Research Affairs	30 Aug–4 Sep 2019	504	36	22	20	8	1	11	2	14
Karmasin	29 Aug–3 Sep 2019	3,000	35	21	20	9	1	12	2	14
GfK/Demox Research	September 2019	?	34	23	21	7.5	–	12	2.5	11
Research Affairs	22–28 Aug 2019	504	36	22	20	8	1	11	2	14
Unique Research	19–22 Aug 2019	800	36	20	20	9	1	12	2	16
Research Affairs	16–21 Aug 2019	505	35	21	19	8	2	11	4	14
Research Affairs	9–14 Aug 2019	506	35	21	19	9	2	11	3	14
OGM	8–12 Aug 2019	812	35	23	20	8	1.5	11	1.5	12
Kowarcz Marktforschung	26 Jul–9 Aug 2019	1,600	31	20	22	9	2	13	3	9
Research Affairs	1–7 Aug 2019	505	36	22	20	8	2	10	2	14
Market	2–5 Aug 2019	800	35	22	20	10	1	10	2	13
Research Affairs	25–31 Jul 2019	502	36	22	20	8	1	11	2	14
Research Affairs	18–24 Jul 2019	504	36	22	20	7	1	12	2	14
Research Affairs	5–17 Jul 2019	1,002	37	22	19	7	1	12	2	15
Unique Research	8–12 Jul 2019	800	37	20	21	9	1	11	1	16
Research Affairs	5–10 Jul 2019	501	37	22	18	8	1	12	2	15
IFES (for SPÖ)	1–10 Jul 2019	1,200	37	23	19	8	1	11	1	14
Market	8–9 Jul 2019	807	36	21	20	10	1	11	1	15
Research Affairs	27 Jun–4 Jul 2019	1,002	37	22	18	8	2	11	2	15
Peter Hajek	24–28 Jun 2019	800	38	20	20	9	1	11	1	18
Research Affairs	14–20 Jun 2019	1,003	38	23	17	8	2	10	2	15
SORA	31 May–10 Jun 2019	1,089	38	21	18	8	1	12	2	17
Market	5–6 Jun 2019	809	38	22	19	9	1	10	1	16
Unique Research	31 May–5 Jun 2019	800	37	20	21	10	1	10	1	16
Research Affairs	29 May–4 Jun 2019	1,000	38	23	17	9	1	9	3	15
Research Affairs	29–31 May 2019	500	38	23	17	10	1	8	3	15
Unique Research	29–31 May 2019	954	38	21	19	10	1	10	1	17
OGM	27–29 May 2019	805	36	22	21	8	1.5	10	1.5	14
GfK/Demox Research	Late May 2019	1,000	37.5	22.5	18.5	10.5	–	8.5	2	15
Research Affairs	18–20 May 2019	500	38	26	18	9	2	5	2	12
Research Affairs	9–15 May 2019	1,000	34	25	23	8	2	5	3	9
GfK/Demox Research	25 Apr–2 May 2019	1,500	34	27	22	8	2	6	1	7
Research Affairs	25 Apr–1 May 2019	1,002	34	25	22	9	2	5	3	9
Research Affairs	11–17 Apr 2019	1,007	34	24	23	9	2	5	3	10
Market	12–15 Apr 2019	803	34	28	22	7	2	5	2	6
Unique Research	8–12 Apr 2019	800	34	28	22	7	2	5	2	6
GfK/Demox Research	28 Mar–11 Apr 2019	1,500	33	27	24	7	2	6	1	6
Research Affairs	28 Mar–3 Apr 2019	1,001	34	24	23	8	3	5	3	10
Research Affairs	14–20 Mar 2019	1,002	34	24	25	7	3	5	2	9
Unique Research	11–15 Mar 2019	800	34	25	24	8	2	5	2	9
Unique Research	4–7 Mar 2019	800	33	27	24	7	2	6	1	6
Research Affairs	26 Feb–6 Mar 2019	1,001	34	24	24	7	3	6	2	10
Peter Hajek	21–28 Feb 2019	800	34	27	23	8	1	6	1	7
Research Affairs	13–20 Feb 2019	1,005	34	25	24	7	2	6	2	9
Unique Research	11–15 Feb 2019	800	32	26	25	8	1	6	2	6
GfK/Demox Research	5–8 Feb 2019	1,000	34	27	22	8.5	1.5	5	2	7
Research Affairs	31 Jan–6 Feb 2019	1,002	34	25	23	7	3	5	3	9
Research Affairs	17–23 Jan 2019	1,002	34	26	23	7	2	6	2	8
OGM	15–17 Jan 2019	803	35	27	24	7	2	5	0	8
Unique Research	7–11 Jan 2019	800	35	27	21	8	2	6	1	8
Research Affairs	3–9 Jan 2019	1,002	34	26	24	7	2	5	2	8
Unique Research	10–14 Dec 2018	800	35	26	22	8	2	6	1	9
Market	7–12 Dec 2018	804	34	27	24	7	2	5	1	7
Research Affairs	6–12 Dec 2018	1,001	34	25	24	8	2	5	2	9
Peter Hajek	3–11 Dec 2018	800	35	26	22	9	3	5	0	9
GfK/Demox Research	26 Nov–9 Dec 2018	2,000	34	26	23.5	7.5	1.5	5.5	2	8
Unique Research	3–6 Dec 2018	800	33	26	22	9	3	6	1	7
Research Affairs	22–28 Nov 2018	1,001	34	25	24	7	2	6	2	9
Unique Research	12–16 Nov 2018	800	35	24	24	9	2	5	1	11
Market	13–15 Nov 2018	803	33	26	25	8	2	5	1	7
Research Affairs	8–14 Nov 2018	1,001	34	25	24	6	3	5	3	9
Peter Hajek	22–31 Oct 2018	1,000	33	25	25	7	2	6	2	8
Research Affairs	24–30 Oct 2018	1,004	34	25	25	7	2	4	3	9
Spectra	9–29 Oct 2018	708	33	25	26	6	5	4	1	7
Research Affairs	11–17 Oct 2018	1,001	34	26	24	7	2	4	3	8
Unique Research	8–12 Oct 2018	800	34	26	25	7	2	5	1	8
OGM	9–11 Oct 2018	802	34	26	26	6	2	4	2	8
GfK/Demox Research	Early Oct 2018	1,500	33	27.5	23.5	7	2	5	2	5.5
Research Affairs	27 Sep–3 Oct 2018	1,003	34	27	23	7	2	4	3	7
Market	25–27 Sep 2018	804	33	28	23	8	2	5	1	5
Research Affairs	19–20 Sep 2018	506	34	24	24	8	2	4	4	10
Spectra	27 Aug–17 Sep 2018	793	32	25	27	7	4	4	1	5
Unique Research	10–13 Sep 2018	800	34	28	25	7	1	4	1	6
Unique Research	3–6 Sep 2018	800	33	29	23	7	2	5	1	4
Research Affairs	30 Aug–5 Sep 2018	1,002	33	27	23	7	3	3	4	6
Peter Hajek	23–29 Aug 2018	700	34	28	23	7	3	4	1	6
Market	20–23 Aug 2018	800	33	28	23	7	2	6	1	5
Research Affairs	16–22 Aug 2018	1,001	33	26	23	8	3	3	4	7
Spectra	31 Jul–22 Aug 2018	715	32	26	26	6	5	4	1	6
Unique Research	6–10 Aug 2018	800	34	29	23	5	2	4	3	5
Research Affairs	2–8 Aug 2018	1,002	33	27	24	7	2	3	4	6
Research Affairs	19–25 Jul 2018	1,001	33	27	24	6	2	4	4	6
Spectra	4–23 Jul 2018	717	33	26	24	6	4	5	2	7
Unique Research	9–13 Jul 2018	800	34	29	24	5	2	4	2	5
Research Affairs	5–11 Jul 2018	1,008	33	26	24	7	2	5	3	7
Spectra	6–29 Jun 2018	709	34	26	28	4	4	3	1	6
OGM	26–28 Jun 2018	806	33	28	25	6	2	5	1	5
Research Affairs	21–27 Jun 2018	1,004	33	26	25	6	2	5	3	7
Unique Research	18–21 Jun 2018	800	33	27	25	7	3	4	1	6
Market	12–15 Jun 2018	800	34	26	25	7	2	5	1	8
Research Affairs	7–13 Jun 2018	1,004	33	26	25	5	2	5	4	7
Peter Hajek	4–11 Jun 2018	700	34	26	25	8	1	4	2	8
Unique Research	4–6 Jun 2018	800	33	27	25	8	1	4	2	6
Spectra	9 May–5 Jun 2018	732	33	27	28	4	4	3	1	6
Research Affairs	24–30 May 2018	1,003	32	26	24	5	3	5	5	6
Unique Research	22–25 May 2018	800	32	25	25	7	4	6	1	7
Research Affairs	10–16 May 2018	1,008	32	27	23	6	3	5	4	5
IMAS	18 Apr–9 May 2018	1,007	33	28	26	5	2	5	2	5
Research Affairs	26 Apr–2 May 2018	1,005	32	28	24	7	2	4	3	4
Spectra	9–30 Apr 2018	738	34	28	27	5	4	1	1	6
Peter Hajek	19–25 Apr 2018	700	33	26	26	8	2	4	1	7
Research Affairs	12–18 Apr 2018	1,004	32	27	24	7	2	5	3	5
Unique Research	8–13 Apr 2018	500	33	27	24	6	2	6	2	6
Research Affairs	29 Mar–4 Apr 2018	1,008	32	28	23	7	3	4	3	4
Market	26–29 Mar 2018	811	32	28	25	8	2	4	1	4
Spectra	6–26 Mar 2018	717	31	27	29	4	6	2	1	2
Unique Research	19–22 Mar 2018	800	32	30	23	8	2	4	1	2
OGM	19–21 Mar 2018	519	32	28	24	7	3	5	1	4
Research Affairs	14–21 Mar 2018	1,008	32	28	22	6	3	5	4	4
IMAS	14 Feb–18 Mar 2018	2,073	32	28	25	7	2	3	3	4
Unique Research	12–15 Mar 2018	500	31	28	25	7	3	6	0	3
Market	6–8 Mar 2018	807	33	29	24	8	2	3	1	4
Research Affairs	1–7 Mar 2018	1,048	32	27	24	6	3	4	4	5
Research Affairs	15–21 Feb 2018	1,010	31	26	24	7	3	5	4	5
Peter Hajek	12–20 Feb 2018	726	34	25	25	7	2	5	2	9
Spectra	25 Jan–19 Feb 2018	709	33	28	26	5	6	2	0	5
Unique Research	11–16 Feb 2018	500	33	26	26	7	2	5	1	7
Research Affairs	1–8 Feb 2018	1,001	31	26	25	6	3	5	4	5
Research Affairs	18–24 Jan 2018	997	31	27	26	6	3	4	3	4
Unique Research	15–19 Jan 2018	500	34	27	25	6	3	4	1	7
Research Affairs	4–10 Jan 2018	1,020	31	27	27	6	2	4	3	4
Peter Hajek	18–21 Dec 2017	700	31	28	26	6	2	5	2	3
Market	18–20 Dec 2017	800	33	27	26	6	2	4	2	6
Research Affairs	18–20 Dec 2017	600	32	26	28	6	2	3	3	4
Unique Research	11–15 Dec 2017	500	31	27	26	8	3	3	2	4
Market	1–6 Dec 2017	814	32	26	26	6	3	5	2	6
Research Affairs	4–6 Dec 2017	600	32	27	28	5	2	3	3	4
Research Affairs	21–23 Nov 2017	600	32	27	27	4	2	4	4	5
Unique Research	13–17 Nov 2017	500	32	28	24	6	2	6	2	4
Research Affairs	7–9 Nov 2017	600	33	27	27	4	2	5	2	6
Market	6–9 Nov 2017	1,030	31	28	26	5	4	4	2	3
Research Affairs	18–20 Oct 2017	600	33	28	27	4	4	3	1	5
Christina Matzka	16–17 Oct 2017	500	29.9	26.9	25.9	5.9	5.0	4.8	1.6	3.0
2017 legislative election	15 Oct 2017	–	31.5	26.9	26.0	5.3	4.4	3.8	2.2	4.6

== Preferred Chancellor ==
Polling firm	Fieldwork date	Sample size	Kurz ÖVP	Rendi-Wagner/ Kern SPÖ	Hofer/ Strache FPÖ	Meinl-Reisinger/ Strolz NEOS	Kogler Grüne	Bierlein	Other/ None
Research Affairs	30 Aug–4 Sep 2019	504	42	21	19	–	–	–	18
Research Affairs	22–28 Aug 2019	504	40	20	19	–	–	–	21
Unique research	19–22 Aug 2019	800	32	12	15	7	7	–	27
Research Affairs	16–21 Aug 2019	505	42	18	20	–	–	–	20
Research Affairs	9–14 Aug 2019	506	45	17	20	–	–	–	18
OGM	8–12 Aug 2019	812	40	19	23	7	10	–	2
Research Affairs	9–14 Aug 2019	506	42	17	20	–	–	–	20
Research Affairs	1–7 Aug 2019	505	43	18	21	7	9	–	1
Market	2–5 Aug 2019	800	35	13	10	8	7	13	14
Research Affairs	25–31 Jul 2019	502	44	17	21	7	10	–	1
Research Affairs	18–24 Jul 2019	504	45	17	20	7	10	–	1
Research Affairs	5–17 Jul 2019	1002	46	17	20	6	10	–	1
Unique Research	8–12 Jul 2019	800	37	11	14	6	6	–	26
Research Affairs	5–10 Jul 2019	501	46	18	19	6	10	–	1
Market	8–9 Jul 2019	807	34	13	13	–	–	17	23
Research Affairs	27 Jun–4 Jul 2019	1,002	42	15	18	5	8	11	1
Research Affairs	27 Jun–4 Jul 2019	1,002	46	18	19	6	9	–	2
Peter Hajek	24–28 Jun 2019	800	37	13	13	5	6	–	26
Research Affairs	14–20 Jun 2019	1,003	46	29	25	–	–	–	–
Market	5–6 Jun 2019	809	39	12	10	6	–	17	16
Unique Research	31 May–5 Jun 2019	800	33	10	16	6	5	–	30
Research Affairs	29 May–4 Jun 2019	1,000	46	19	19	–	–	–	16
Unique Research	29–31 May 2019	954	38	10	14	6	–	–	32
Research Affairs	18–20 May 2019	500	46	26	13	–	–	–	15
GfK/Demox Research	25 Apr–2 May 2019	1,500	59	36	–	–	–	–	5
Research Affairs	25 Apr–1 May 2019	1,002	41	27	19	–	–	–	13
Research Affairs	11–17 Apr 2019	1,007	41	26	20	–	–	–	13
Market	12–15 Apr 2019	803	42	22	9	6	–	–	21
Unique Research	8–12 Apr 2019	800	42	16	12	?	–	–	?
GfK/Demox Research	28 Mar–11 Apr 2019	1,500	56	35	–	–	–	–	9
Research Affairs	28 Mar–3 Apr 2019	1,001	41	26	20	–	–	–	13
Research Affairs	14–20 Mar 2019	1,002	40	26	21	–	–	–	13
Unique Research	11–15 Mar 2019	800	40	15	13	4	–	–	28
Unique Research	4–7 Mar 2019	800	39	16	12	4	–	–	29
Research Affairs	26 Feb–6 Mar 2019	1,001	40	26	20	–	–	–	14
Peter Hajek	21–28 Feb 2019	800	38	19	15	5	–	–	23
Research Affairs	13–20 Feb 2019	1,005	40	27	19	–	–	–	14
Unique Research	11–15 Feb 2019	800	35	16	14	4	–	–	?
Research Affairs	31 Jan–6 Feb 2019	1,002	40	28	18	–	–	–	14
Research Affairs	17–23 Jan 2019	1,002	40	29	18	–	–	–	13
Unique Research	7–11 Jan 2019	800	39	16	12	4	–	–	?
Research Affairs	3–9 Jan 2019	1,002	40	29	19	–	–	–	12
Unique Research	10–14 Dec 2018	800	41	16	12	?	–	–	?
Market	7–12 Dec 2018	804	36	26	9	4	–	–	25
Research Affairs	6–12 Dec 2018	1,001	40	28	19	–	–	–	13
Peter Hajek	3–11 Dec 2018	800	38	17	13	5	–	–	27
Unique Research	3–6 Dec 2018	800	37	17	13	4	–	–	29
Research Affairs	22–28 Nov 2018	1,001	40	27	19	–	–	–	14
Unique Research	12–16 Nov 2018	800	41	16	13	?	–	–	?
Market	13–15 Nov 2018	803	39	23	25	4	–	–	?
Research Affairs	8–14 Nov 2018	1,001	40	28	19	–	–	–	13
Peter Hajek	22–31 Oct 2018	1,000	32	18	15	3	–	–	32
Research Affairs	24–30 Oct 2018	1,004	40	28	19	–	–	–	13
Spectra	9–29 Oct 2018	1,006	30	18	16	2	–	–	34
Research Affairs	11–17 Oct 2018	1,001	40	29	18	–	–	–	13
Unique Research	8–12 Oct 2018	800	33	15	12	?	–	–	?
Research Affairs	27 Sep–3 Oct 2018	1,003	39	30	18	–	–	–	13
Market	25–27 Sep 2018	804	36	25	?	?	–	–	?
Spectra	4 Jul–17 Sep 2018	3,057	29	21	17	2	–	–	30
Unique Research	10–13 Sep 2018	800	35	21	12	?	–	–	?
Unique Research	3–6 Sep 2018	800	35	23	13	2	–	–	27
Research Affairs	30 Aug–5 Sep 2018	1,002	39	30	19	–	–	–	12
Peter Hajek	23–29 Aug 2018	700	32	23	12	3	–	–	30
Research Affairs	16–22 Aug 2018	1,001	39	29	19	–	–	–	13
Unique Research	6–10 Aug 2018	800	32	23	13	3	–	–	29
Research Affairs	2–8 Aug 2018	1,002	39	31	19	–	–	–	11
Unique Research	9–13 Jul 2018	800	36	22	12	2	–	–	28
Research Affairs	5–11 Jul 2018	1,008	38	30	19	–	–	–	13
Spectra	9 Apr–29 Jun 2018	2,995	30	20	17	4	–	–	28
OGM	26–28 Jun 2018	806	39	29	19	3	4	–	6
Research Affairs	21–27 Jun 2018	1,004	38	29	20	–	–	–	13
Unique Research	18–21 Jun 2018	800	34	19	12	6	–	–	29
Market	12–15 Jun 2018	800	44	27	8	2	–	–	19
Research Affairs	7–13 Jun 2018	1,004	38	29	21	–	–	–	12
Peter Hajek	4–11 Jun 2018	700	33	23	15	?	–	–	?
Unique Research	4–6 Jun 2018	800	35	23	15	5	–	–	22
Research Affairs	24–30 May 2018	1,003	37	29	20	–	–	–	14
Unique Research	22–25 May 2018	800	34	20	14	?	–	–	?
Research Affairs	10–16 May 2018	1,008	37	30	20	–	–	–	13
Research Affairs	26 Apr–2 May 2018	1,005	37	30	21	–	–	–	12
Peter Hajek	19–25 Apr 2018	700	34	21	16	5	–	–	24
Research Affairs	12–18 Apr 2018	1,004	36	29	21	–	–	–	14
Unique Research	8–13 Apr 2018	500	35	25	13	?	–	–	?
Research Affairs	29 Mar–4 Apr 2018	1,008	36	29	21	–	–	–	14
Market	26–29 Mar 2018	811	38	26	10	4	–	–	22
Spectra	25 Jan–26 Mar 2018	1,994	31	22	18	–	–	–	29
Unique Research	19–22 Mar 2018	800	36	26	13	3	–	–	22
Research Affairs	14–21 Mar 2018	1,008	36	29	20	–	–	–	15
Unique Research	12–15 Mar 2018	500	37	29	11	?	–	–	?
Market	6–8 Mar 2018	807	37	30	11	6	–	–	16
Research Affairs	1–7 Mar 2018	1,048	36	28	21	–	–	–	15
Research Affairs	15–21 Feb 2018	1,010	35	27	21	–	–	–	17
Peter Hajek	12–20 Feb 2018	726	38	22	14	–	–	–	26
Unique Research	11–16 Feb 2018	500	43	21	14	?	–	–	?
Research Affairs	1–8 Feb 2018	1,001	34	27	22	–	–	–	17
Research Affairs	18–24 Jan 2018	997	33	28	23	–	–	–	16
Unique Research	15–19 Jan 2018	500	37	26	14	?	–	–	?
Research Affairs	4–10 Jan 2018	1,020	32	26	24	–	–	–	18
Peter Hajek	18–21 Dec 2017	700	33	25	15	4	–	–	23
Market	18–20 Dec 2017	800	39	29	?	–	–	–	?
Unique Research	11–15 Dec 2017	500	32	26	14	4	–	–	24
Market	1–6 Dec 2017	814	34	34	?	–	–	–	?
Research Affairs	21–23 Nov 2017	600	33	26	25	–	–	–	16
Unique Research	13–17 Nov 2017	500	34	31	15	4	–	–	16
Research Affairs	7–9 Nov 2017	600	34	27	25	–	–	–	14
Market	6–9 Nov 2017	1,030	42	32	14	–	–	–	12
Research Affairs	18–20 Oct 2017	600	39	28	17	–	–	–	16
Christina Matzka	16–17 Oct 2017	500	32	30	16	–	–	–	22

== Preferred coalition ==
Polling firm	Fieldwork date	Sample size	ÖVP–FPÖ	ÖVP–SPÖ	SPÖ–FPÖ	ÖVP	ÖVP–Grüne– NEOS	SPÖ–Grüne– NEOS	ÖVP–NEOS	ÖVP–Grüne	SPÖ–Grüne	Other	Don't know/ no answer
Research Affairs	6 Sep–11 Sep 2019	511	28	7	5	–	7	14	8	4	7	20	
Research Affairs	30 Aug–4 Sep 2019	504	23	10	6	–	8	12	9	5	8	19	
Research Affairs	22–28 Aug 2019	504	25	10	5	–	8	11	9	3	9	20	
Research Affairs	16–21 Aug 2019	505	28	9	6	–	14	12	–	5	8	18	
OGM	mid-August 2019	812	32	11	6	–	11	26	10	4	–	0	
Research Affairs	1–7 Aug 2019	505	28	10	5	–	10	14	–	4	9	20	
Research Affairs	25–31 Jul 2019	502	32	8	6	–	13	15	–	6	9	11	
Unique Research	22-25 Jul 2019	500	20	16	6	–	28	–	–	–	–	17	12
Research Affairs	18-24 Jul 2019	504	26	10	7	–	13	13	–	5	10	16	
Research Affairs	5-17 Jul 2019	1002	27	9	7	–	14	13	–	5	11	14	
Research Affairs	5-10 Jul 2019	501	21	8	4	–	–	20	17	7	–	23	
Research Affairs	27 Jun–4 Jul 2019	1,002	23	7	5	–	–	20	14	9	–	22	
Peter Hajek	24–28 Jun 2019	800	21	14	6	–	23	–	–	–	–	21	13
Research Affairs	14–20 Jun 2019	1,003	24	7	8	–	–	18	15	8	–	20	
Research Affairs	29 May–4 Jun 2019	1,000	21	8	6	–	26	19	–	–	–	20	
OGM	27–29 May 2019	805	24	14	9	–	30	–	–	–	–	23	
Peter Hajek	May 2019	500	21	7	5	–	25	19	–	–	–	23	–
Research Affairs	18–20 Oct 2017	600	34	15	21	13	–	–	–	–	–	17	
Unique Research	16–20 Oct 2017	500	35	17	12	5	–	–	–	–	–	10	20
Christina Matzka	16–17 Oct 2017	500	45	20	13	2	–	–	–	–	–	20	

== See also ==
- Opinion polling for the 2017 Austrian legislative election
