= Maria Stern =

Maria Stern may refer to:

- Maria Stern (poker player)
- Maria Stern (singer-songwriter)

== See also ==
- Maria Stein
- Maria Steen
- Maria Sten
