= EU Exit Party =

EU Exit Party for Austria EU-Austrittspartei für Österreich
- Leader: Mag. Robert Marschall
- Founded: 15 September 2011
- Dissolved: 26 July 2019
- Headquarters: 2340 Mödling, Hauptstraße 2/1
- Ideology: Hard Euroscepticism
- Political position: Right-wing

Website
- www.euaustrittspartei.at

The EU Exit Party for Austria (German: EU-Austrittspartei für Österreich, EUAUS) is a political party in Austria founded on 15 September 2011. Its party programme is centered mainly on the demand to withdraw from the European Union and the establishment of direct democracy.

It contested the 2013 legislative election, but only appeared on the ballot in Vorarlberg. It failed to pass the electoral threshold of 4%.

For the EU election 2014, together with the Neutral Free Austria Federation (Bündnis Neutrales Freies Österreich) which has very similar aims, the party has formed an electoral platform called EU-STOP. In the Viennese elections 2015, the NFAF formed another electoral alliance with the EU Exit Party.

In the legislative election 2017 the EU Exit Party participated in the state of Vienna.

In the legislative election 2019 the party aimed to participate together with the Platform ÖXIT (consisting of the Bündnis NFÖ and the Initiative Heimat und Umwelt) but withdrew its endorsement for them on 26 July due to organisational disputes and financial uncertainties, leading to the dissolution of the party.

== Election results ==
=== National Council ===
National Council of Austria
Election year	# of total votes	% of overall vote	# of seats	Government
2013	510	0.01%	0 / 183	Extra-parliamentary
2017	693	0.01%	0 / 183	Extra-parliamentary

=== European Parliament ===
Election	Votes	%	Seats	+/–
2014	77,897	2.76(#6)	0 / 18	▲
