= Alfred J. Noll =

Austrian lawyer, politician and writer (1960–2026)

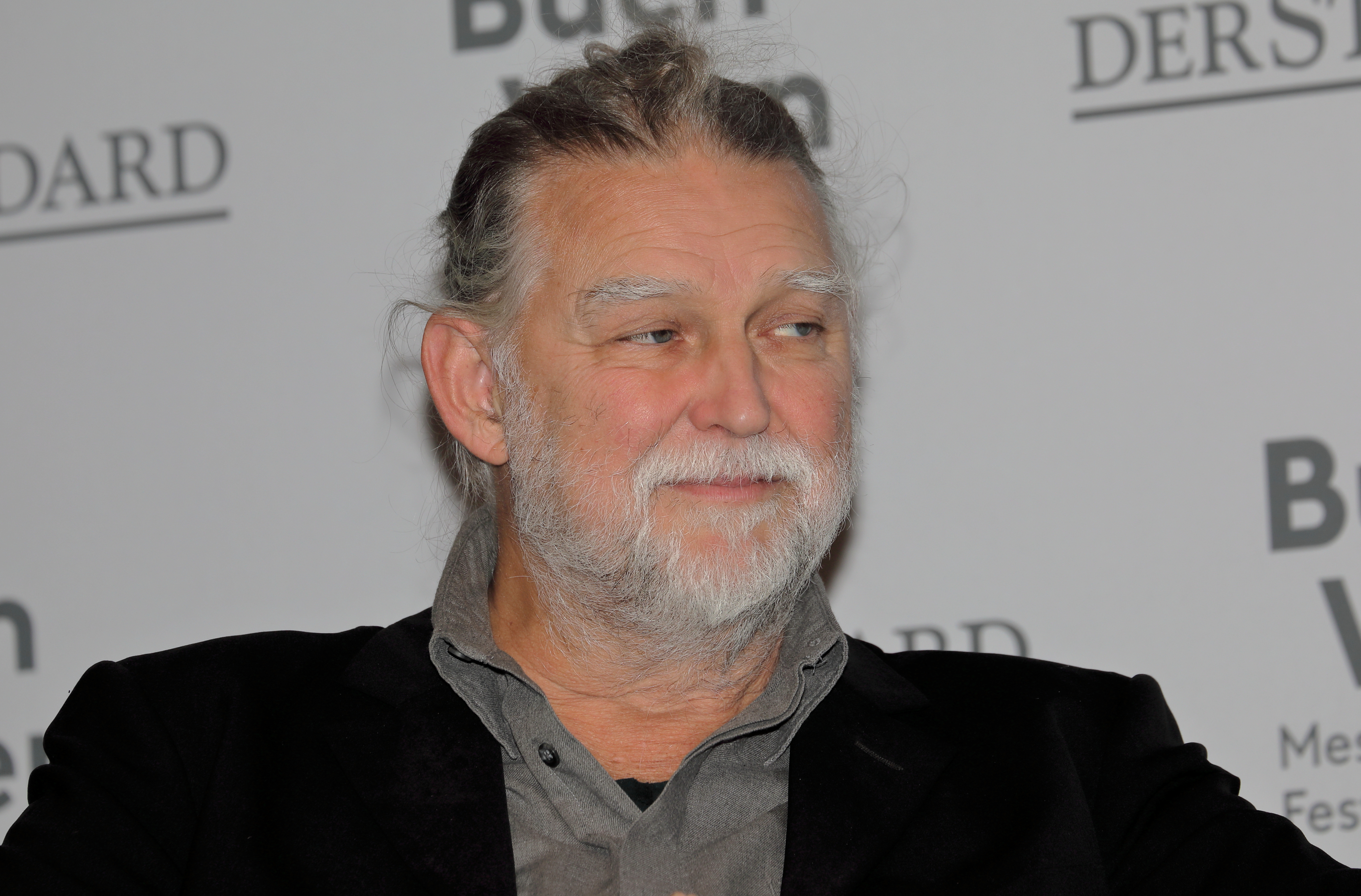
- Noll in 2023

Member of the National Council of Austria
- In office 9 November 2017 – 22 October 2019

Personal details
- Born: Alfred Johannes Noll; 30 January 1960 Salzburg, Austria
- Died: 16 March 2026 (aged 66)
- Party: JETZT
- Education: Werkschulheim Felbertal; University of Salzburg
- Occupation: Lawyer, writer

Alfred Johannes Noll (30 January 1960 – 16 March 2026) was an Austrian lawyer, politician and writer. A member of JETZT, he served in the National Council of Austria from 2017 to 2019.

Noll earned his law degree from the University of Salzburg. After earning his degree, he worked as a lawyer in Vienna, and earned his habilitation with the essay Objectivity or Equality? A legal policy study on law and equality before the Austrian Constitutional Court at the University of Natural Resources and Life Sciences, Vienna, where taught public law. He was named a university professor in 2013.

In 2016, he was awarded the Austrian State Prize in the category Cultural Journalism.

Noll died on 16 March 2026, at the age of 66.
