= 2017 Austrian legislative election =

- 15 October 2017

All 183 seats in the National Council 92 seats needed for a majority
- Opinion polls
- Turnout: 80.0% (▲5.1 pp)
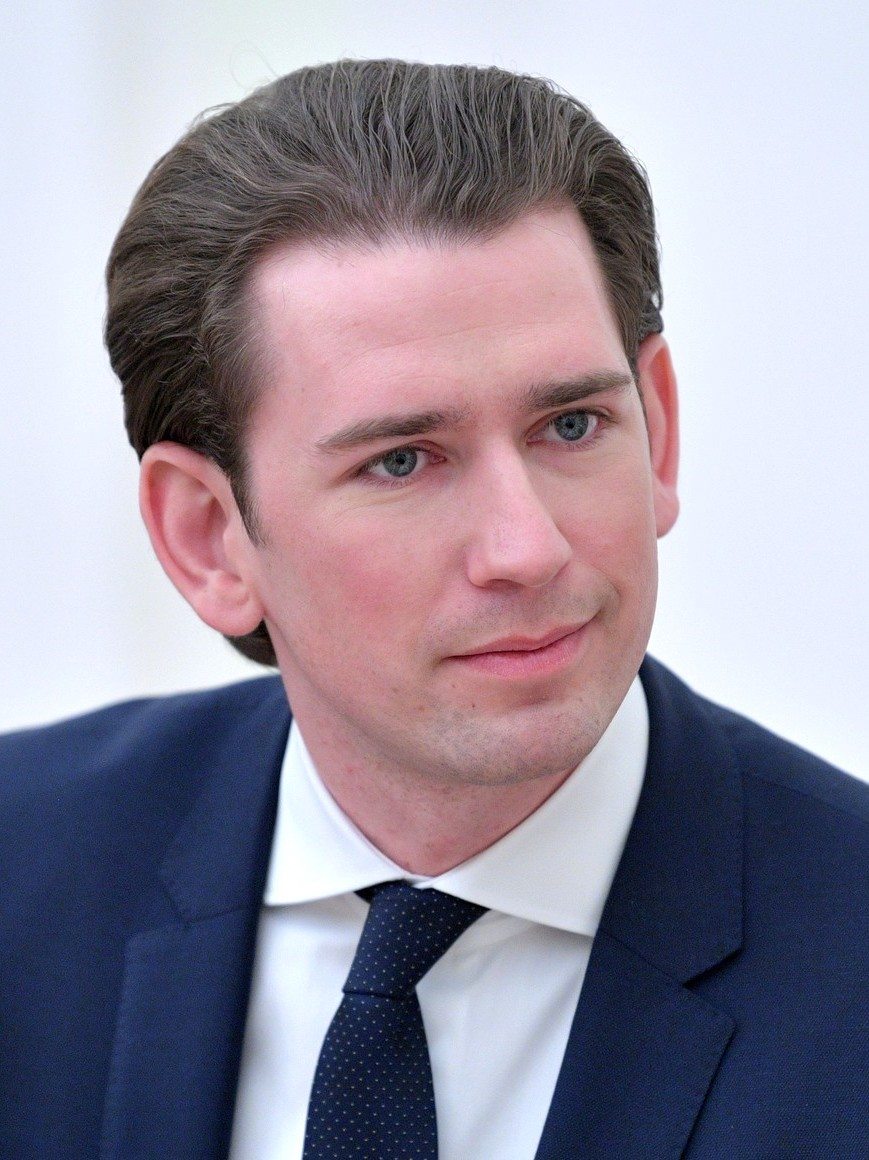

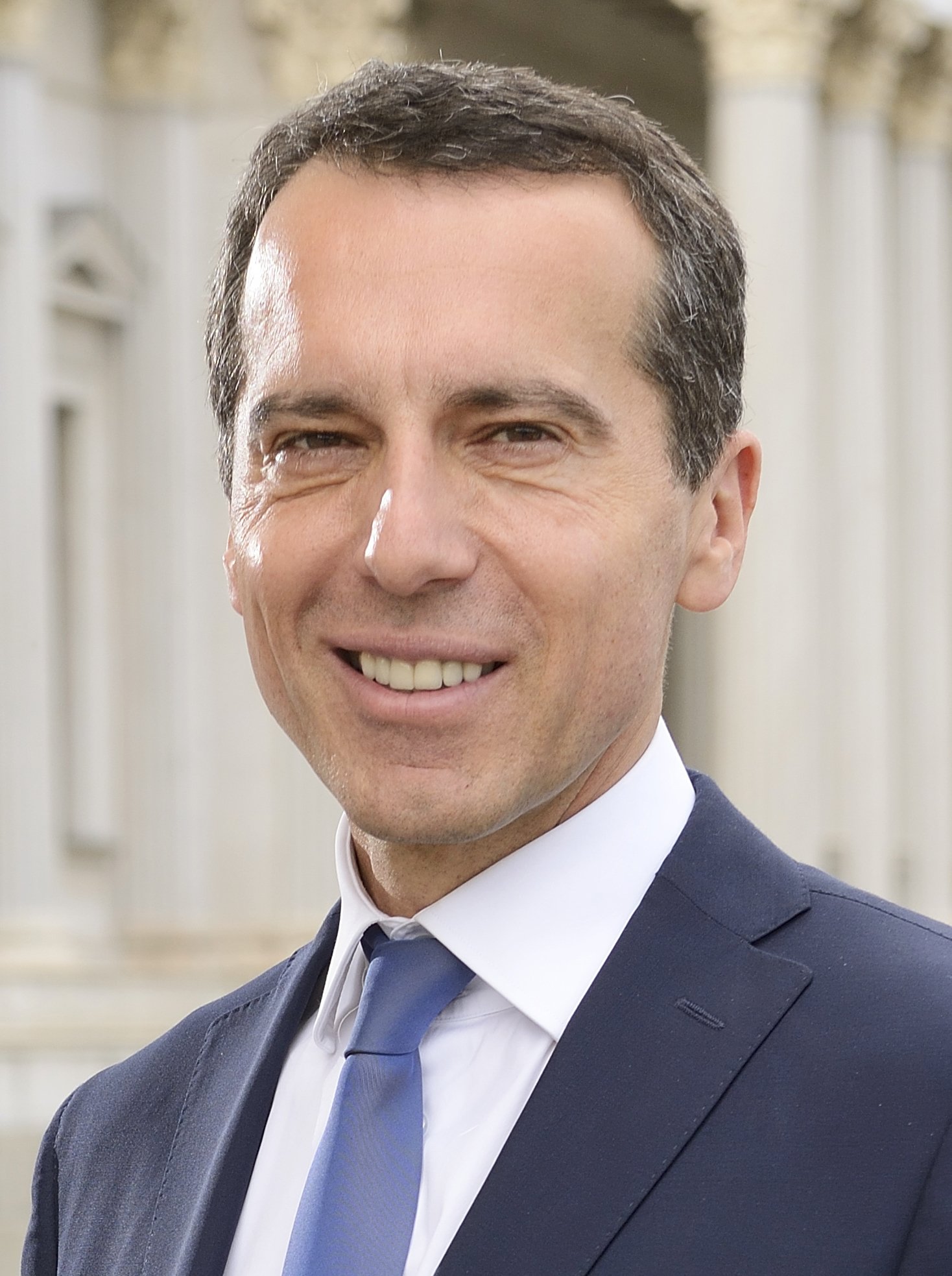

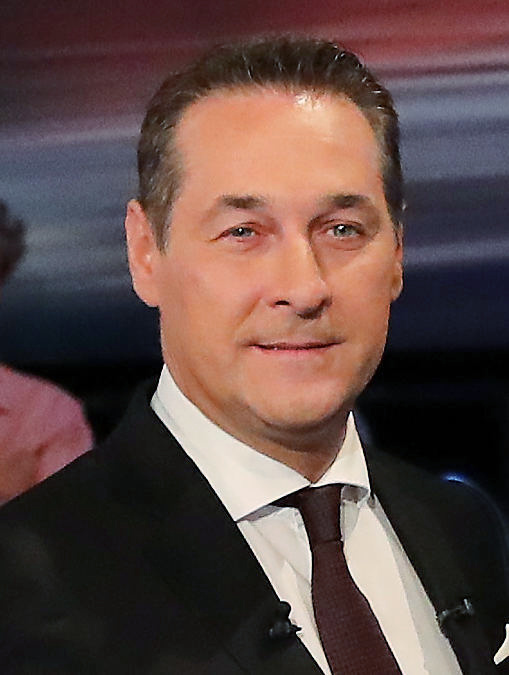

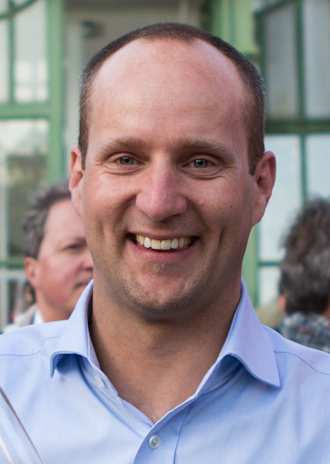

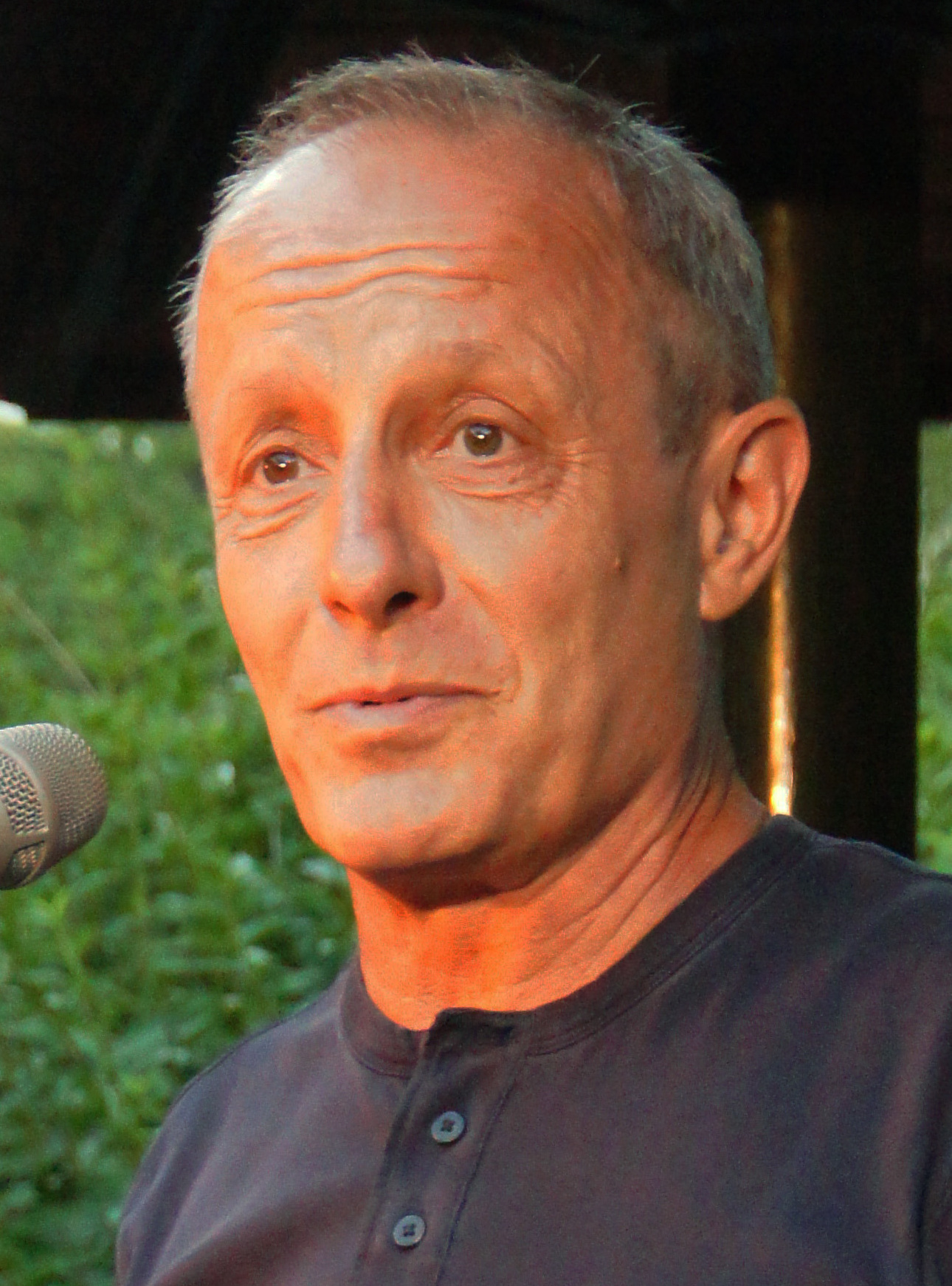

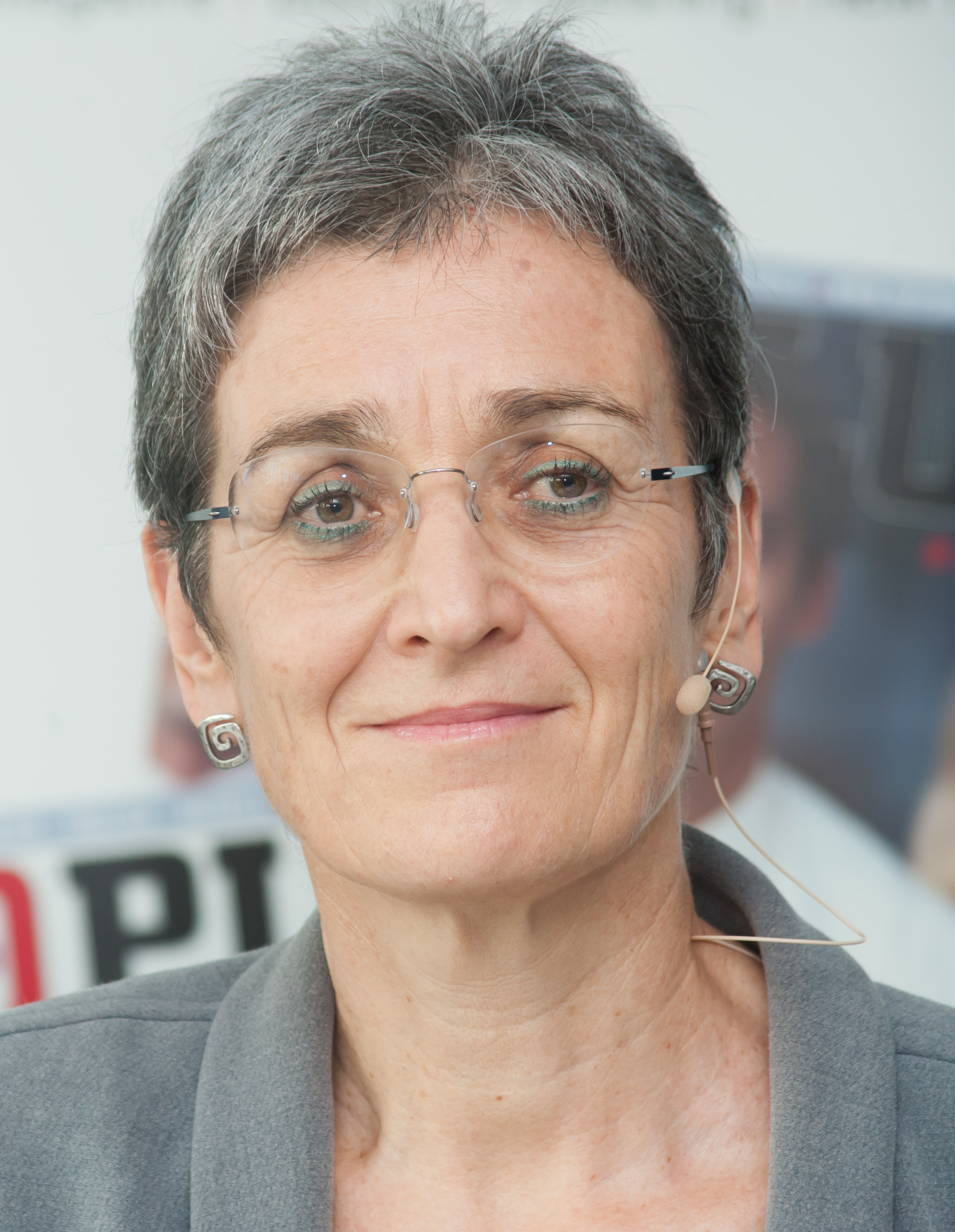
	First party	Second party	Third party
Leader	Sebastian Kurz	Christian Kern	Heinz-Christian Strache
Party	ÖVP	SPÖ	FPÖ
Last election	24.0%, 47 seats	26.8%, 52 seats	20.5%, 40 seats
Seats won	62	52	51
Seat change	▲15	Steady	▲11
Popular vote	1,595,526	1,361,746	1,316,442
Percentage	31.5%	26.9%	26.0%
Swing	▲7.5 pp	▲0.1 pp	▲5.5 pp
	Fourth party	Fifth party	Sixth party
Leader	Matthias Strolz	Peter Pilz	Ulrike Lunacek
Party	NEOS	PILZ	Greens
Leader since			19 May 2017
Last election	5.0%, 9 seats	Did not exist	24 seats, 12.4%
Seats won	10	8	0
Seat change	▲1	▲8	▼24
Popular vote	268,518	223,543	192,638
Percentage	5.3%	4.4%	3.8%
Swing	▲0.3 pp	New party	▼8.6%
Chancellor before election
Christian Kern
SPÖ
Elected Chancellor
Sebastian Kurz
ÖVP

Legislative elections were held in Austria on 15 October 2017 to elect the 26th National Council, the lower house of Austria's bicameral parliament. The snap election was called when the coalition government between the Social Democratic Party of Austria (SPÖ) and Austrian People's Party (ÖVP) was dissolved in May by the latter party's new leader Sebastian Kurz.

The ÖVP took a strong lead in opinion polls after Kurz's confirmation as leader, and emerged as the largest party in the election, with 31.5% of the vote and 62 of the 183 seats in the National Council. The SPÖ finished second with 52 seats, just ahead of the Freedom Party of Austria (FPÖ), which won 51 seats. NEOS was fourth with 10 seats. The Greens failed to pass the 4% electoral threshold and lost parliamentary representation for the first time since winning seats in the 1986 elections. The Peter Pilz List, which had split from the Greens at the start of the campaign, received 4.4% of the vote and won 8 seats.

Sebastian Kurz claimed victory on election night. Incumbent Chancellor and SPÖ leader Christian Kern announced that he was willing to consider a coalition with the FPÖ, though he said that the likelihood of such a coalition was very small. Kurz was formally invited to form a government on 20 October, and began coalition talks with FPÖ leader Heinz-Christian Strache four days later. Negotiation teams on both sides were established to work on a coalition agreement. The talks proved to be successful and led to the formation of the first Kurz government on 18 December.

== Background ==
Conservative ÖVP party leader Reinhold Mitterlehner resigned on 10 May. On 14 May Minister for Foreign Affairs and Integration Sebastian Kurz was unanimously elected new leader of the ÖVP by the federal party committee and called a snap election. Kurz announced the creation of an independent (but ÖVP-backed) list for the elections under the name "List Sebastian Kurz - The new People's Party", which would be open to non-ÖVP experts or otherwise-interested people.

Green Party leader Eva Glawischnig resigned from all her offices on 18 May, citing family and health-related reasons but also increasing political pressure over the last months following the expulsion of the Young Greens from the party, as well as the coming challenging election campaign. On 19 May, the Green Party committee unanimously elected current Tyrol state party head Ingrid Felipe as its new party leader. However, MEP Ulrike Lunacek was chosen as the party's candidate for the Chancellorship in the 2017 elections.

On 14 June, the Social Democratic Party (SPÖ) announced that it would drop a 30-year ban on coalitions with the far-right FPÖ under certain conditions. The party's "values compass" included a set of requirements that any coalition partner had to fulfil, including having a pro-European policy, a commitment to a minimum wage of €1,500 a month, gender equality and upholding human rights.

On 27 June Team Stronach announced that they would not contest the elections after founder Frank Stronach decided to stop all financial contributions to the party and stated his intention to leave politics.

On 8 July independent 2016 presidential candidate Irmgard Griss joined an electoral alliance with NEOS. Although not a member of the party and despite not participating in their primaries, she was given second place on the NEOS list after party leader Matthias Strolz. This measure was approved by a wide margin among delegates at a party meeting in Vienna.

On 14 July, former FPÖ-leader in Salzburg Karl Schnell announced that he would run in the election with a list called "Freie Liste Österreich – Liste Dr. Karl Schnell (FLÖ)". Schnell already has the support of 3 MPs in parliament and won't need to submit 2600 signatures to be on the ballot.

On 17 July long-time Green Party MP and founding member Peter Pilz decided to leave the parliamentary club. On 25 June, a majority of Green Party delegates at a convention voted not to renew his spot on the party list for the election. Pilz has repeatedly stated interest for running his own list in the election. On 25 July, he presented his new list, Peter Pilz's List, during a press conference. Pilz already has the support of 4 MPs in parliament and won't need to submit 2600 signatures to be on the ballot.

On 14 August the SPÖ ended their co-operation with Israeli election adviser Tal Silberstein after he was arrested in Israel on suspicion of money-laundering and corruption. For several years, Silberstein worked as an opinion poll and campaign strategy consultant on behalf of the Social Democratic Party.

On 14 August popular Austrian comedian Roland Düringer announced that his satirical, anti-establishment list My Vote Counts! (G!LT) collected more than 2600 signatures and will appear on the ballot in every state.

On 16 August the KPÖ+ election alliance between the Communist Party of Austria (KPÖ) and the Young Greens announced that they collected more than 2600 signatures and will appear on the ballot in every state. Following their expulsion from the Green Party in May, the Young Greens joined the alliance with the Communist Party.

On 30 September SPÖ general secretary and campaign manager Georg Niedermühlbichler resigned, following revelations of an internal SPÖ "dirt campaign" directed against ÖVP-leader Sebastian Kurz. The negative Facebook campaigning websites were initiated by former, controversial SPÖ adviser Tal Silberstein who got fired by the party a month before. In the days following the revelations and a blame-game about the origins and responsibility in the affair, the ÖVP decided to sue the SPÖ and vice versa.

On 6 October PR adviser and former Silberstein associate Peter Puller claimed to have been offered €100,000 by the ÖVP in exchange for internal information on the SPÖ election campaign, citing a meeting between himself and a Kurz campaign official. The ÖVP are denying that any offers were made.

== Electoral system ==
The 183 members of the National Council are elected by open list proportional representation in nine multi-member constituencies based on the states (with varying in size from 7 to 36 seats) and 39 sub-constituencies. Seats are allocated using the Hare method at the sub-constituency level and the D'Hondt at the federal level, with an electoral threshold of 4% or one seat in one of the 39 sub-constituencies. Voters are able to cast a party vote and one preference votes on each the federal, state and electoral district level for their preferred candidates within that party. The thresholds for a candidate to move up the list are 7% of the candidate's party result on the federal level, 10% on the state level and 14% on the electoral district level. Candidates for sub-constituency level are listed on the ballot while voters need to write-in their preferred candidate on state and federal level.

== Contesting parties ==
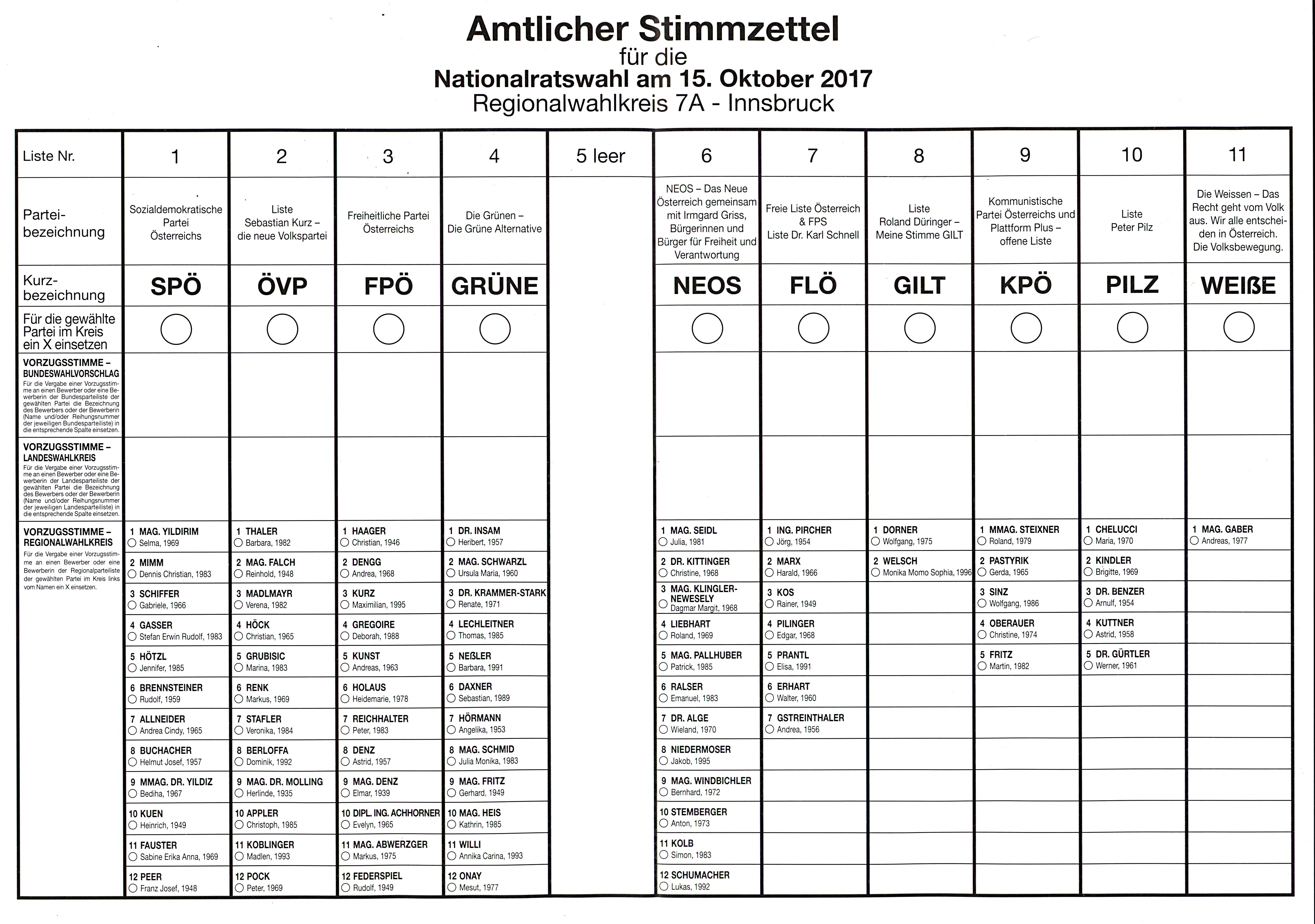
Official election ballot (sample)

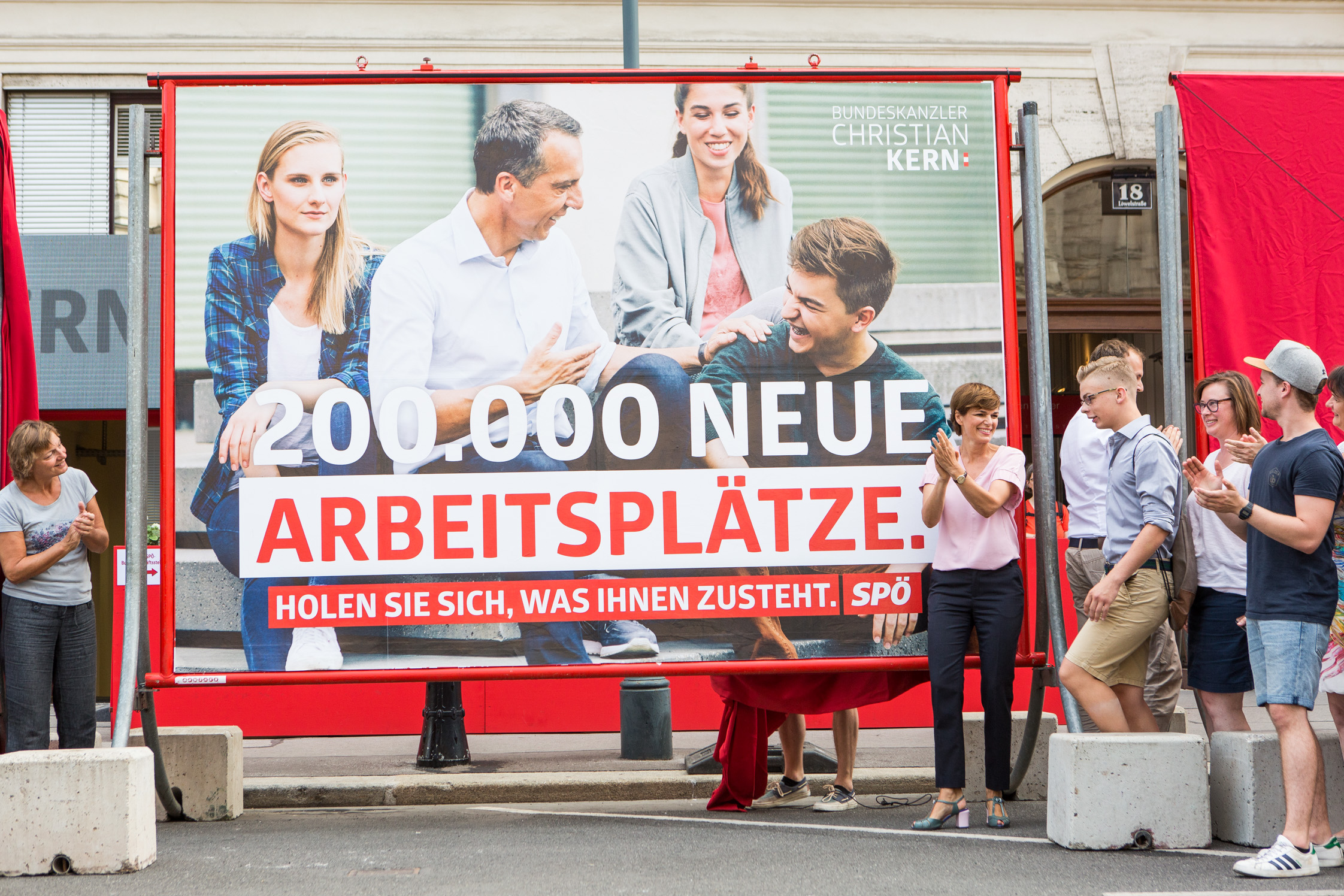
Election poster from the SPÖ

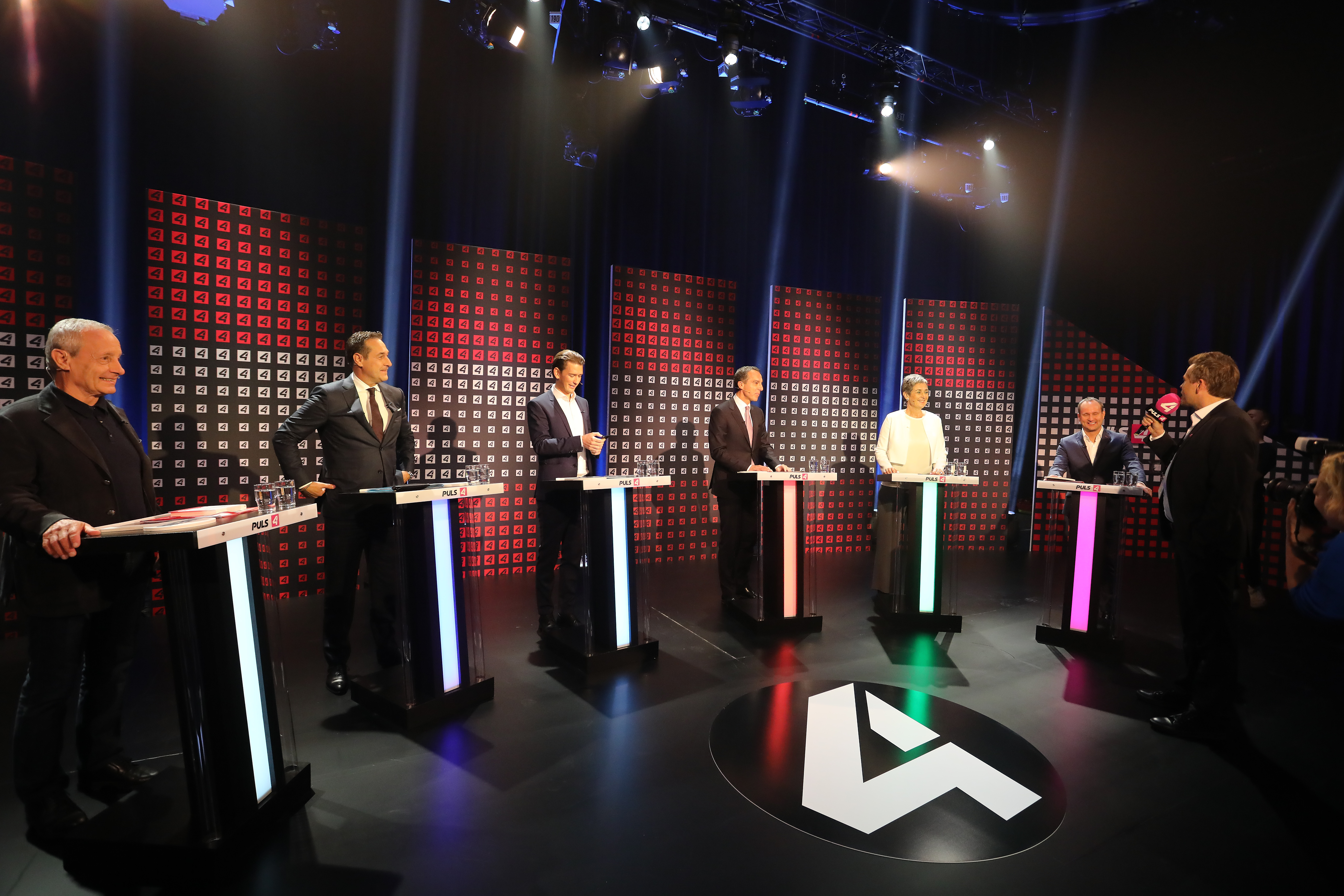
Puls 4 TV debate of the main candidates

The table below lists parties represented in the 25th National Council.

Name		Ideology	Leader	2013 result	
Name		Ideology	Leader	Votes (%)	Seats
SPÖ	Social Democratic Party of Austria; Sozialdemokratische Partei Österreichs	Social democracy	Christian Kern	26.8%	52 / 183
ÖVP	Austrian People's Party; Österreichische Volkspartei	Christian democracy	Sebastian Kurz	24.0%	47 / 183
FPÖ	Freedom Party of Austria; Freiheitliche Partei Österreichs	Right-wing populism Euroscepticism	Heinz-Christian Strache	20.5%	40 / 183
GRÜNE	The Greens; Die Grünen	Green politics	Ulrike Lunacek	12.4%	24 / 183
FRANK	Team Stronach; Team Stronach für Österreich	Classical liberalism Right-wing populism	Frank Stronach	5.7%	11 / 183
NEOS	NEOS	Liberalism; Pro-Europeanism	Matthias Strolz	5.0%	9 / 183

Team Stronach dissolved prior to the election and did not participate.

=== Ballot access requirements ===
In order to contest the election nationwide, a party (or list) must have the support of three members of parliament or collect 2,600 valid signatures from eligible voters ahead of the elections.

Parties may contest the election in individual states only, if they so chose. To do so, they must submit a minimum number of voter signatures that varies by state as follows:

- 100 – Burgenland, Vorarlberg
- 200 – Carinthia, Salzburg, Tyrol
- 400 – Upper Austria, Styria
- 500 – Lower Austria, Vienna

Parties were able to collect the signatures between 25 July and 18 August. The state and federal election commissions validated the signatures and announced the qualified parties on 24 August.

=== Parties that collected enough signatures ===
In addition to the parties already represented in the National Council (except Team Stronach, which dissolved in August and did not contest the election), eleven parties collected enough signatures to be placed on the ballot. Five of these were cleared to be on the ballot in all states, six of them only in some.

==== On the ballot in all 9 states ====
- Peter Pilz List (PILZ)
- Free List Austria (FLÖ)
- The Whites (WEIßE)
- My Vote Counts! (G!LT)
- KPÖ Plus: KPÖ and Young Greens (KPÖ)

==== On the ballot in some states only ====
- Socialist Left Party (SLP) – on the ballot only in Vienna and Upper Austria
- Homeless in Politics – Christian Liberals – Austria's Christian Poverty Party (ODP) – on the ballot only in Vienna
- EU Exit Party (EUAUS) – on the ballot only in Vienna
- New Movement for the Future (NBZ) – on the ballot only in Vorarlberg
- Men's Party (M) – on the ballot only in Vorarlberg
- Christian Party of Austria (CPÖ) – on the ballot only in Vorarlberg

== Voter statistics ==
According to final numbers, 6,400,993 citizens older than 16 were eligible to vote in the election. A total of 3,307,645 women and 3,093,348 men were eligible to vote. The numbers also included 60,762 Austrians who had their main residence abroad, but who registered in time to vote. Despite Vienna being the most populous state, Lower Austria had the most eligible voters (1,288,802), while Burgenland had the fewest (232,740). After a period of objection, the number of eligible voters was finalized and released on 15 September by the state and federal election commissions.

A total of 889,193 postal ballots had been requested ahead of the election, a new record. That number was up significantly from the election in 2013 when 668,810 ballots were requested. It was estimated that roughly 780,000 postal ballots will be cast, or about 15-16% of all ballots cast. The overwhelming majority of postal ballots was counted on Monday, 16 October and a small part on Thursday, 19 October - when the final election result was made official.

== Campaign ==
Issues being debated included immigration, integration, crime and security, tax cuts, job creation/reducing unemployment, pensions and care for the elderly.

== Opinion polls ==
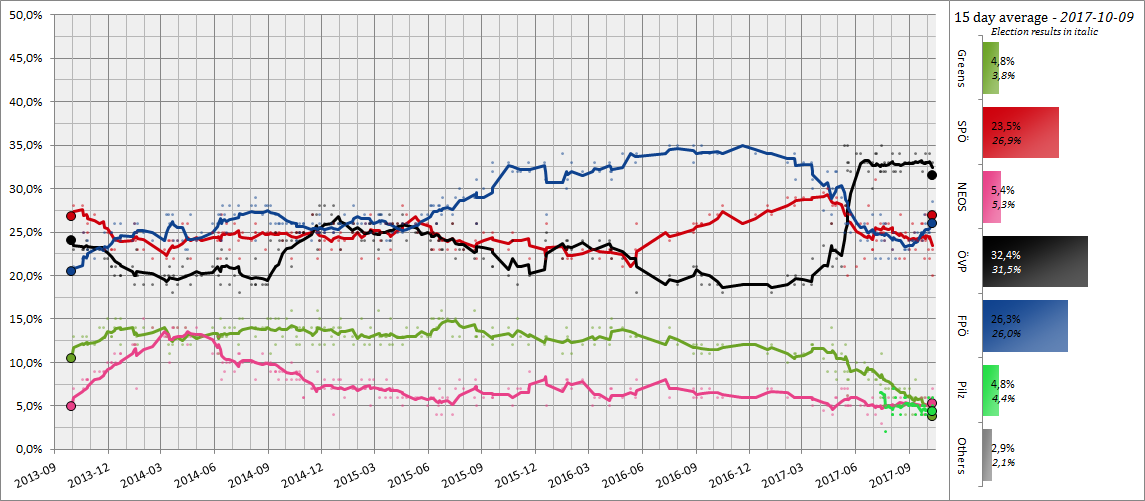

== Results ==
Party	Votes	%	Seats	+/–
Austrian People's Party	1,595,526	31.47	62	+15
Social Democratic Party of Austria	1,361,746	26.86	52	0
Freedom Party of Austria	1,316,442	25.97	51	+11
NEOS	268,518	5.30	10	+1
Peter Pilz List	223,543	4.41	8	New
The Greens	192,638	3.80	0	−24
My Vote Counts!	48,234	0.95	0	New
Communist Party of Austria	39,689	0.78	0	0
The Whites	9,167	0.18	0	New
Free List Austria	8,889	0.18	0	New
New Movement for the Future	2,724	0.05	0	New
Homeless in Politics	761	0.02	0	New
Socialist Left Party	713	0.01	0	0
EU Exit Party	693	0.01	0	0
Christian Party of Austria	425	0.01	0	0
Men's Party	221	0.00	0	0
Total	5,069,929	100.00	183	0
Valid votes	5,069,929	99.01		
Invalid/blank votes	50,952	0.99		
Total votes	5,120,881	100.00		
Registered voters/turnout	6,400,993	80.00		
Source: Interior Ministry

=== Results by state ===
State	ÖVP	SPÖ	FPÖ	NEOS	PILZ	Grüne	Others	Turnout
Burgenland	32.8	32.9	25.2	2.9	2.8	2.0	1.3	84.5
Carinthia	26.8	29.3	31.8	4.3	3.6	2.4	1.7	78.5
Lower Austria	35.6	24.8	25.9	4.8	4.1	2.7	1.9	84.8
Upper Austria	31.5	27.6	26.8	4.8	3.7	3.7	1.9	81.8
Salzburg	37.7	22.2	24.4	5.7	3.5	4.0	2.4	80.7
Styria	31.5	25.1	29.4	5.0	3.9	2.8	2.2	79.8
Tyrol	38.4	20.8	24.9	5.7	3.8	4.5	1.8	76.4
Vorarlberg	34.7	17.8	24.4	9.0	3.0	7.2	3.8	72.2
Vienna	21.6	34.5	21.3	6.5	7.5	5.9	2.8	76.1
Austria	31.5	26.9	26.0	5.3	4.4	3.8	2.1	80.0
Source: Austrian Interior Ministry

=== Preference votes ===
Alongside votes for a party, voters were able to cast a preferential votes for a candidate on the party list. The ten candidates with the most preferential votes on a federal level were as follows:

Party	Pos.	Candidate	Votes	%
ÖVP	1	Sebastian Kurz	145,484	80.7
SPÖ	1	Christian Kern	121,393	55.4
FPÖ	1	Heinz-Christian Strache	62,543	66.3
FPÖ	2	Norbert Hofer	9,492	10.2
SPÖ	25	Hans Peter Doskozil	9,022	7.4
ÖVP	2	Elisabeth Köstinger	7,944	5.5
NEOS	1	Matthias Strolz	7,265	36.1
GRÜNE	1	Ulrike Lunacek	6,748	36.9
PILZ	1	Peter Pilz	6,064	55.1
SPÖ	29	Ahmed Husagić	5,742	4.7

=== Maps ===
Map showing the results of the election on the state level

Map showing the results of the election on the sub-constituency level. The boxes indicate seats won on that level (Grundmandate)

Map showing the results of the election on the district level

Map showing the results of the election on the municipal level ("Gleichstand" = tie)

== Government formation ==
On 20 October, Sebastian Kurz was officially instructed by Austrian President Alexander Van der Bellen to form a new government.

On 22 October, after Sebastian Kurz talked with all party leaders and Chancellor Kern being the last one he talked with, Kern announced that the SPÖ would prepare for opposition starting on Monday, 23 October.

On 24 October, Sebastian Kurz officially invited the FPÖ to coalition talks. The FPÖ accepted this offer and first talks started on Wednesday, 25 October.

On 16 December, the new ÖVP-FPÖ government was officially presented at a press conference by Sebastian Kurz and Heinz-Christian Strache. As result of the negotiations the ÖVP staffed eight cabinet posts and the FPÖ six. Each party also established an additional State Secretary. President Van der Bellen approved the new government and it was sworn in on 18 December.
