= JETZT (party) =

JETZT – Pilz List JETZT – Liste Pilz
- Abbreviation: JETZT
- Chairman: Rudolf Mang
- Founder: Peter Pilz
- Founded: 26 July 2017
- Dissolved: 2020
- Split from: The Greens – The Green Alternative
- Headquarters: Rahlgasse 3/3, 1060 Vienna
- Ideology: Green politics Left-wing populism
- Political position: Centre-left to left-wing
- Colours: Transparent (official); Grey (customary)

Website
- partei.jetzt

JETZT – Pilz List (German: JETZT – Liste Pilz, "jetzt" meaning "now"), founded in 2017 as the Peter Pilz List (Liste Peter Pilz), was a green and left-wing populist political party in Austria. It was founded by Peter Pilz, a former member of The Greens – The Green Alternative, who left his previous party in July 2017 and formed the Peter Pilz List to run in the October legislative election. The party won 4.4% of votes cast and eight seats. In the 2019 legislative election, the party lost its representation in the National Council.

== History ==
A long-time member of The Greens – The Green Alternative, Peter Pilz was among the first delegation of Greens deputies elected to the National Council in 1986, and served as the party's spokesman between 1992 and 1994. At the federal convention of The Greens in June 2017, he sought election for fourth place on the federal party list for the upcoming election. However, he lost to Julian Schmid. He was then offered sixth place on the list, but rejected it and instead announced his retirement from the National Council. Over the following weeks, speculation grew about the prospect of Pilz forming his own party. When questioned on the subject, he neither confirmed or denied rumours. Opinion polls conducted throughout July indicated such a party could garner support from around 4–6% of voters.

On 25 July 2017, Pilz announced his resignation from the Greens and his intention to run his own electoral list for the election, named the "Peter Pilz List". An application for registration as a political party was submitted on 26 July and approved on 31 July. Pilz claimed that he did not intend to found a new political party; no party programme would be formulated, and there would be no party line. He said that registration as a party was necessary to gather the grassroots support he desired, which he did not consider possible with a purely electoral list. He intended each candidate on the list to specialise in and represent a specific policy area, stating he sought to "people the programme".

For his list, Pilz initially presented teacher, musician, and activist Maria Stern, lawyer and consumer advocate Peter Kolba, former Social Democratic Party of Austria (SPÖ) politician and animal rights activist Sebastian Bohrn Mena, entrepreneur Stephanie Cox, and lawyer Alfred J. Noll. On 28 July, three National Council deputies defected from their parties and joined the Pilz list: Wolfgang Zinggl and Bruno Rossmann from The Greens and Daniela Holzinger-Vogtenhuber from the SPÖ. Their support allowed the party to bypass the threshold of 2,600 signatures normally required for ballot access in all nine states. In August, four more candidates were presented: Renée Schroeder and Hannes Werthner (for science policy), nursing assistant Teresa Roscher (for nursing), and lawyer Alma Zadić (for integration).

=== 2017 legislative election ===
The Pilz List carried out an unconventional campaign, eschewing posters which traditionally play a prominent part in Austrian campaigns. The party published only one poster, a blank page with text reading: "1 poster - our only one! / 0 EUR tax money / 0 pestering / Yes, it works!" and a link to the party's website. The party campaigned heavily on social media, as well as through various media appearances. They promoted their candidates via public functions and so-called "Pilz talks" concerning various policy areas. The events were conducted in a participatory fashion, with anyone interested given the opportunity to engage in the discussion. Peter Pilz called for public funding of political parties to be halved, and financed his campaign using voluntary donations. He stated the party's goal for the election was to win a double-digit percentage of votes.

The party ultimately won 4.4% of the electorate with 223,543 votes, and secured eight seats in the National Council. The Pilz List outperformed Pilz's former party, with the Greens falling short of the 4% electoral threshold, losing all their seats. Analysis by the SORA Institute showed that, compared to the 2013 election results, the Pilz List took 67,000 votes (30% of its total) from the Greens, 32,000 from the SPÖ, 31,000 from NEOS – The New Austria and Liberal Forum and non-voters, 12,000 from the Freedom Party of Austria, 10,000 from the Austrian People's Party, 8,000 from Team Stronach, 6,000 from the Alliance for the Future of Austria, and 20,000 from other parties. The seats were filled by Peter Pilz, Bruno Rossmann, Wolfgang Zinggl, Daniela Holzinger-Vogtenhuber, Alfred J. Noll, Stephanie Cox, Alma Zadić, and Peter Kolba.

=== Following the 2017 election ===
In early November 2017, Die Presse published statements from an anonymous employee of the Greens parliamentary group accusing Peter Pilz of repeated sexual harassment and sexual assault, ranging from verbal harassment to groping. Subsequently, Falter published further allegations that an employee of the European People's Party was groped by Pilz at the 2013 European Forum Alpbach. Pilz denied all accusations, but announced on 4 November he would no longer accept his seat in the National Council. On 8 November, he was replaced by Martha Bißmann. Peter Kolba subsequently became parliamentary leader of the party.

On 18 December 2017, Kolba announced that the Pilz List would not run in the upcoming state elections in Carinthia, Lower Austria, Salzburg, and Tyrol. He stated the party wanted time to build as a movement, and that they planned to compete in the following European Parliament elections.

On 14 January 2018, Kolba announced that Pilz would return to the National Council. The timeframe for the move and who would resign to allow his re-entry was not clarified. This was strongly criticised by other parties, with the women's spokeswomen of both the SPÖ and NEOS stating the allegations against him were "not even partially cleared up".

On 22 May 2018, the Innsbruck public prosecutor's office suspended its investigation of Pilz for sexual harassment due to the alleged victims' inability to press charges.

On 15 April 2018, Kolba announced his pending resignation as parliamentary leader, which was later delayed due to lack of agreement on a new leader. On 30 May, Bruno Rossmann was chosen to succeed Kolba. On 31 May, Kolba announced his immediate resignation from the National Council, claiming he "wanted nothing more to do with this list anymore." He did not explain his motivations, and party members claimed they were unaware that he intended to resign. He was to be succeeded by Maria Stern. However, Stern agreed to decline her mandate and allow Pilz to re-enter the National Council via the federal list in exchange for being guaranteed election as the party's federal leader. Pilz thus returned to the National Council on 8 June. During his swearing-in on 11 June, all female deputies left the chamber with the exception of those from the Pilz group, Second President of the National Council Doris Bures, and NEOS deputy Karin Doppelbauer.

The party's relations with Martha Bißmann, who had taken up Pilz's original seat in November 2017, had become increasingly strained; by June 2018, the party was on the verge of expelling her. However, after discussions, on 12 June they granted her a "last chance". She resigned from the party, but remained in the Pilz List parliamentary group. On 10 July, Sebastian Bohrn Mena was expelled from the parliamentary group without notice after speaking critically of Pilz in an interview. On 19 July, Bißmann was also expelled from the parliamentary group.

At a party meeting on 20 August 2018, Maria Stern was elected as party leader. Pilz became deputy leader.

On 19 November 2018, the party announced it was changing its name to "NOW – Pilz List" (German: JETZT – Liste Pilz). The parliamentary group took the name "JETZT" the next day, while the party formally changed its name on 3 December. The party also adopted a formal party programme, which identified four key priorities: Europe, ecology, justice, and oversight.

=== 2019 elections and exit from parliament ===
In the 2019 European Parliament election on 26 May, JETZT ran a joint list named "EUROPA NOW! – Initiative Johannes Voggenhuber", featuring former Greens MEP Johannes Voggenhuber as the lead candidate. The list won 1.04% of votes cast and failed to win any seats.

After a snap legislative election was called in June 2019, Alfred J. Noll, Bruno Rossmann, Wolfgang Zinggl and Stephanie Cox announced they would not seek re-election. Alma Zadić announced she would instead run for the Greens; she was elected to the fifth spot on the Greens' federal list. On 9 July, she was expelled from the JETZT parliamentary group.

In the election, JETZT garnered 89,169 votes (1.87%), less than half the number they had won in 2017, losing their representation in the National Council. Peter Pilz's former party, the Greens, re-entered parliament with their best ever result, winning 13.9% of votes cast and 26 seats.

After the election, Stern and Pilz resigned. Carinthian former police officer Rudolf Mang was elected as the party's new leader.

== Ideology and platform ==
After the launch of the party, Die Presse described it as an answer to the Greens' failure to "take the left-wing populist course Peter Pilz recommended," and "at the same time a political experiment. ... Socio-politically the movement is clearly left ... On the other hand, when it comes to the topic of "Migration and Asylum", the initiative should be classified on the right." They emphasised Pilz's outspoken opposition to "Political Islam", which he described as a greater threat to Austria than right-wing populism.

The Pilz List has been compared to German party The Left, which is often classified as left-wing populist. Political scientist Reinhard Heinisch stated that the Pilz list could occupy space in the "left-wing populist area" which has opened up due to the "rightward drift" of other parties on the left. He stated the party could target "older, male, left-wing segments of the electorate with a critical emphasis on social issues and immigration and Islam, who may currently feel less wooed by the Greens."

By design, the party did not have a binding platform or party line; during the 2017 election campaign, the party's website stated, "Our candidates are our programmes." During the 2017 election campaign, Kurier listed the "most important points" of the Pilz platform as:

- Fighting "Political Islam" and combating the "Erdoğan network" (emphasised by Pilz)
- A 35-hour work week, inheritance tax with an exemption limit of €500,000, a reduction in income tax, opposing austerity, and cracking down on tax evasion (Bruno Rossmann)
- Greater parliamentary oversight and new alliances in parliament (Bruno Rossmann and Wolfgang Zinggl)
- The introduction of effective class action and compensation, reform of housing law, and restriction of temporary leases (Peter Kolba)
- Countering the flexibilization of working hours and enabling greater balance of work and family time (Daniela Holzinger-Vogtenhuber)
- A ban on large-scale animal transportation (Sebastian Bohrn Mena)
- An independent Ministry for Integration and expanded on language education and integration services, including 2,000 specially trained integration teachers (Alma Zadić)
- Investment relief for entrepreneurs, including a separate legal form for social enterprises (Stephanie Cox)
- Doubling funding for scientific research, to €400 million annually (Renee Schroeder)
- At least one day of free admission to federal museums per week, and opposing private investment in heritage protection (Wolfgang Zinggl)
- Modernising the Support Act, including the introduction of child support (Maria Stern)

== Finances ==
During the 2017 election campaign, the Peter Pilz List hosted a live list of all donations it received on its website. For donations over €1,000, the donor was required to give their name for the public record. The party received 1,359 donations totalling €289,644 in the year of its foundation, with almost a third of that coming from a single donation of €98,365 from party candidate Alfred J. Noll. The second largest donation came from candidate Renée Schroeder with €20,000.

In the last quarter of 2017, the Pilz list received €812,121 in public funding due to its three National Council deputies. From 2018, it received €4.8 million in party and public funding. After JETZT failed to win seats in the 2019 legislative election, the party foundation "Education Association - Open Society" retained €1.4 million in public funding which it was not required to repay.

== Election results ==
National Council of Austria
Election year	# of total votes	% of overall vote	# of seats	Government
2017	223,543 (5th)	4.41	8 / 183	Opposition
2019	89,169 (6th)	1.87	0 / 183	Extra-parliamentary

== Symbols ==
At the unveiling of the party, Pilz stated its official colour is "transparent", but that white would suffice for representation in opinion polls. However, the party has primarily been portrayed using grey, and often uses the colour in promotional material.

First 2017 logo

Second 2017 logo

2018 logo

== See also ==
- Der Wandel
- Madeleine Petrovic List
