= New Movement for the Future =

New Movement for the Future (German: Neue Bewegung für die Zukunft, Turkish: Gelecek için Yeni Hareket, Serbo-Croatian: Novi pokret za budućnost) is an Austrian migrant workers' movement established in 1999, and since 2017 a namesake minor Austrian political party. It has been taking part to the Vorarlberg Austrian Chamber of Labour's elections since 1999.

It was officially registered as a party on 1 January 2017, and was founded by Turkish migrants.

== Results at Vorarlberg Austrian Chamber of Labour's elections ==
1999	2004	2009	2014
3,200 votes	3,053 votes	2,874 votes	2,383 votes
7.2%	6.6%	6.08%	5.48%
5 seats	4 seats	4 seats	4 seats

Whereas the NBZ was the sole list with Turkish candidates in 1999, others did so in 2004 and the number of non-NBZ Turks elected rose from 4 in 2009 (1 Conservative, 1 Social Democrat, 1 Liberal, 1 Green) to 5 in 2014 (1 Social Democrat, 1 Liberal, 3 Greens).

== 2009 Landtag elections in Vorarlberg ==
A NBZ list was announced to take part in the 2009 Vorarlberg state election, 2009, but this led to such a controversy that its leader, Adnan Dincer, announced on 2 April 2009 the decision not to take part as such in these elections.

Finally, several NBZ candidates were included on a common list including five minor parties, including the Communist Party of Austria, Die Gsiberger (GSI). Gsiberger is Vorarlberg's inhabitants nickname given by other Austrians because of some peculiar expression in their Alemannic (not Austro-Bavarian as in other parts of Austria) dialect. The anticorruption Euro-MP Hans-Peter Martin supported this list "in order to counter parties oligopoly". "Die Gsiberger" got 3,042 votes (1.74%) and no representative.

== Political ideology ==
The party claims to be for Austrians of a Turkish immigrant background, but insists that it is not purely Turkish or Islamic. The party supports Turkish president Recep Tayyip Erdoğan and opposed the 2016 Turkish coup d'état attempt.
