= Peter Pilz =

Austrian politician

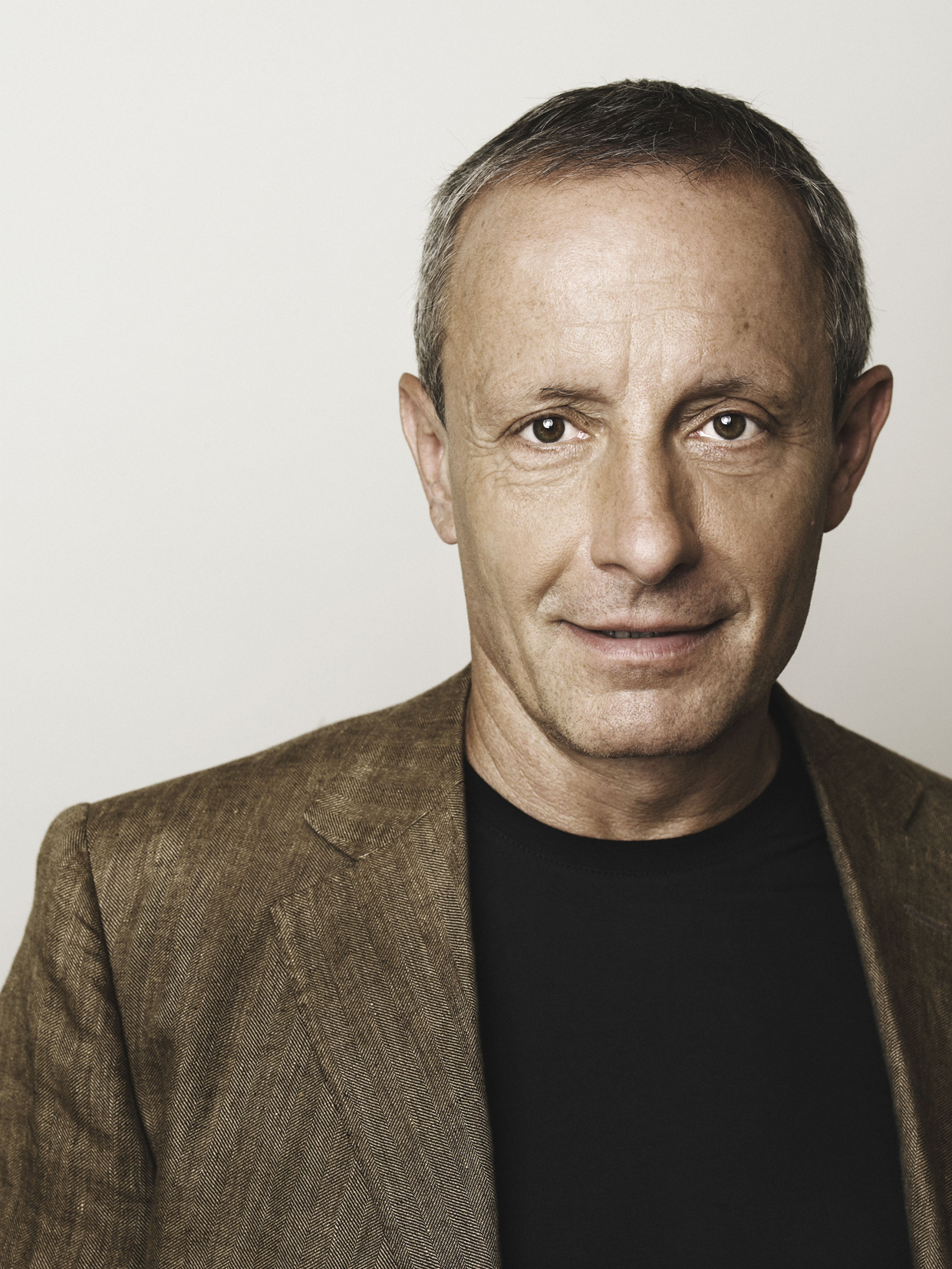

Member to the National Council
- In office 10 June 2018 – 29 September 2019
- Affiliation: Peter Pilz List
- In office 29 October 1999 – 8 November 2017
- Nominated by: Johannes Voggenhuber
- Affiliation: The Greens
- In office 17 December 1986 – 8 December 1991
- Affiliation: Green Alternative

Chairman of the Peter Pilz List
- In office 26 July 2017 – 20 August 2018
- Preceded by: Office established
- Succeeded by: Maria Stern

Spokesman of the Green Party
- In office 1992–1994
- Preceded by: Johannes Voggenhuber
- Succeeded by: Madeleine Petrovic

Personal details
- Born: 22 January 1954 (age 72) Kapfenberg, Styria, Austria
- Party: JETZT; formerly known as Peter Pilz List (since 2017)
- Other political affiliations: The Greens (before 2017)

Peter Pilz (born 22 January 1954) is an Austrian politician (JETZT). From 1986 to 2017, he was a member of the Austrian Green Party.

== Political career ==
Born in Kapfenberg, Styria, Pilz was a member of the Austrian Parliament (Nationalrat) between 1986 and 1991, 1999 and 2017, and between 2018 and 2019. From 1992 to 1994 he also was federal spokesperson of the Greens. His main area of interest is legal matters and political corruption. Commonly known wearing a black jacket and a red, grey or green T-shirt, he was the first Austrian politician to keep a blog on the Internet.

In January 2005, Pilz made international news when he called for Arnold Schwarzenegger to be stripped of his Austrian citizenship. As Governor of California, Schwarzenegger had refused to intercede in the execution of a convicted murderer, Donald Beardslee. Pilz pointed to an Austrian law which prohibits any Austrian from taking part in, or ordering, an execution.

A few months later, Pilz claimed that a person whom he called "Zeuge D" (German: "witness D") has information that Iranian president Mahmoud Ahmadinejad had participated in the murder of 3 Kurds in Vienna in 1989. According to him the Austrian police had already contacted the witness, who supposedly lived in France, but this was denied by the Austrian Ministry of Justice.

On 25 July 2017, with the disappointment of Green leadership and lack of responses in refugee and migrant crisis, he announced his independent campaign for the elections to the Austrian parliament in the autumn. He headed the Peter Pilz List, a group of intellectuals, artists and entrepreneurs, critical toward the establishment. His new party cleared the 4 percent threshold for entering parliament in the election and handed a major defeat to the Greens, whose support fell to 3.9 percent from more than 12 percent in 2013.

On 4 November 2017, after sexual harassment allegations came to light, Pilz announced that he would not take his seat in the National Council, and the seat was assumed by Martha Bissmann. On 22 May 2018, Pilz and his party announced that he would return to parliament before summer, as the trial against him had ended.

== Other activities ==
- SK Rapid Wien, member of the board of trustees
