= Maria Stern (singer-songwriter) =

Austrian singer-songwriter and politician (born 1972)

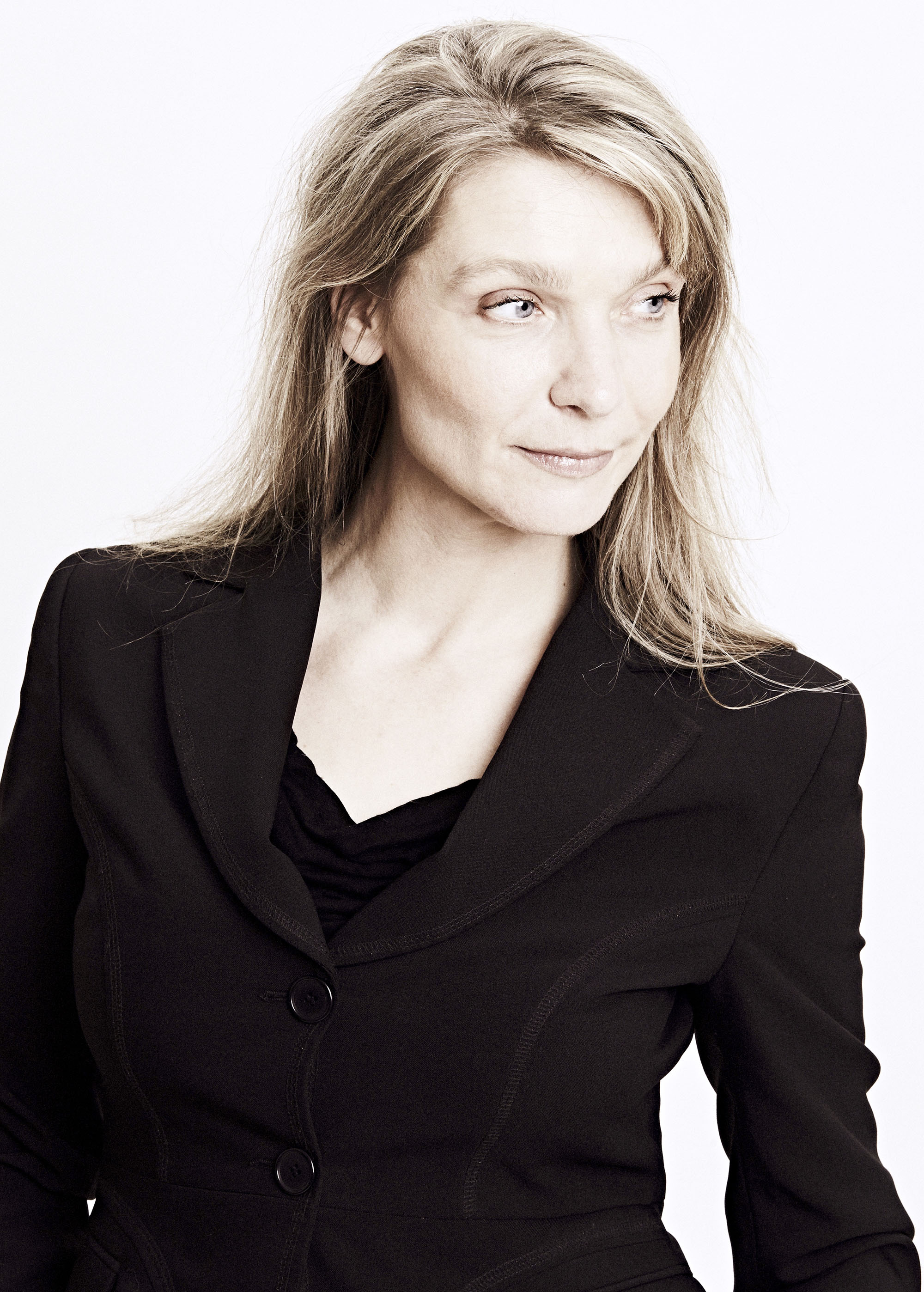
- Stern in 2016

Chairwoman of the NOW – List Pilz
- Incumbent
- Assumed office 20 August 2018
- Preceded by: Peter Pilz

Personal details
- Born: 5 September 1972 (age 53) East Berlin, East Germany (now Berlin, Germany)
- Party: JETZT
- Profession: Singer-songwriter; teacher; writer; politician

Maria Stern (born 5 September 1972) is an Austrian singer-songwriter, teacher, writer and politician. From August 2018 she was the chairwoman of the Peter Pilz List, later known as JETZT.
