= List of members of the 28th National Council of Austria =

This is a list of members of the 28th National Council (German: Nationalrat) of Austria, the lower house of the bicameral legislature. The 28th National Council was elected in the 2024 Austrian legislative election, and was constituted in its first session on 24 October 2024.

== List of members ==
Image	Name	Date of birth	Party	Constituency	State	Notes	Ref.
	Lisa Aldali	1989	NEOS	Federal list		Replacement for Stephanie Krisper	
	Hannes Amesbauer	18 April 1981	FPÖ	6D – Upper Styria	Styria	Resigned on 18 December 2024 to join the state government of Styria Replaced by Albert Royer	
	Katrin Auer	30 June 1974	SPÖ	4D – Traunviertel	Upper Austria		
	Gertraud Auinger-Oberzaucher	21 July 1971	NEOS	3 – Lower Austria	Lower Austria		
	Andreas Babler	25 February 1973	SPÖ	Federal list		Chairman of the Social Democratic Party of Austria Resigned on 6 March 2025 to join Cabinet Stocker Replaced by Muna Duzdar	
	Roland Baumann	19 November 1992	SPÖ	4A – Greater Linz	Upper Austria		
	Angela Baumgartner	20 May 1969	ÖVP	3G – Lower Austria East	Lower Austria		
	Petra Bayr	28 April 1968	SPÖ	9D – Vienna South	Vienna		
	Dagmar Belakowitsch	24 August 1968	FPÖ	Federal list			
	Ricarda Berger	22 May 1986	FPÖ	9 – Vienna	Vienna		
	Tina Berger	7 September 1981	FPÖ	2C – Carinthia West	Carinthia		
	Michael Bernhard	30 April 1981	NEOS	Federal list			
	Reinhold Binder	12 August 1978	SPÖ	Federal list			
	Juliane Bogner-Strauß	3 November 1971	ÖVP	Federal list			
	Henrike Brandstötter	13 October 1975	NEOS	Federal list			
	Lukas Brandweiner	28 May 1989	ÖVP	3 – Lower Austria	Lower Austria		
	Hermann Brückl	3 November 1968	FPÖ	4B – Innviertel	Upper Austria		
	Magnus Brunner	6 May 1972	ÖVP	Federal list		Resigned on 19 November 2024 to join Von der Leyen Commission II Replaced by Andreas Hanger	
	Doris Bures	3 August 1962	SPÖ	9E – Vienna South-West	Vienna	Third President of the National Council	
	Gernot Darmann	7 July 1975	FPÖ	2A – Klagenfurt	Carinthia		
	Romana Deckenbacher	14 January 1967	ÖVP	9 – Vienna	Vienna		
	Gerhard Deimek	9 January 1963	FPÖ	4D – Traunviertel	Upper Austria		
	Antonio Della Rossa	15 January 1982	SPÖ	8 – Vorarlberg	Vorarlberg		
	Veit Dengler	21 November 1968	NEOS	6 – Styria	Styria		
	Martina Diesner-Wais	10 February 1968	ÖVP	3B – Waldviertel	Lower Austria		
	Meri Disoski	4 October 1982	GRÜNE	9 – Vienna	Vienna		
	Karin Doppelbauer	2 March 1975	NEOS	4 – Upper Austria	Upper Austria		
	Muna Duzdar	22 August 1978	SPÖ	Federal list	Federal list	Moved up on 7 March 2025 after the resignation of Andreas Babler	
	Rosa Ecker	10 April 1969	FPÖ	4E – Mühlviertel	Upper Austria		
	Heike Eder	30 May 1988	ÖVP	8B – Vorarlberg South	Vorarlberg		
	Karoline Edtstadler	28 March 1981	ÖVP	Federal list		Resigned on 2 July 2025 to join the state government of Salzburg Replaced by Kira Grünberg	
	Kurt Egger	18 June 1974	ÖVP	6 – Styria	Styria		
	Irene Eisenhut	1974	FPÖ	3C – Mostviertel	Lower Austria		
	Thomas Elian	3 December 1989	ÖVP	3E – Lower Austria South	Lower Austria	Moved up on 7 March 2025 after the resignation of Christian Stocker	
	Melanie Erasim	23 January 1983	SPÖ	3 – Lower Austria	Lower Austria		
	Margreth Falkner	24 July 1975	ÖVP	7D – Oberland	Tyrol		
	Elisabeth Feichtinger	24 September 1987	SPÖ	4 – Upper Austria	Upper Austria	Moved up on 7 March 2025 after the resignation of Eva-Maria Holzleitner	
	Fiona Fiedler	27 January 1976	NEOS	6 – Styria	Styria		
	Hubert Fuchs	13 January 1969	FPÖ	9 – Vienna	Vienna		
	Klaus Fürlinger	1 June 1965	ÖVP	4A – Greater Linz	Upper Austria		
	Johannes Gasser	5 April 1991	NEOS	8 – Vorarlberg	Vorarlberg		
	Leonore Gewessler		GRÜNE				
	Karin Greiner	4 November 1967	SPÖ		Styria		
	Ernst Gödl	15 September 1977	ÖVP	Greater Graz	Styria		
	Elisabeth Götze	19 March 1966	GRÜNE		Lower Austria		
	Lukas Hammer	25 May 1983	GRÜNE	Vienna North West	Vienna		
	Andreas Haitzer	25 December 1967	SPÖ				
	Elke Hanel-Torsch	18 September 1981	SPÖ				
	Peter Manfred Harrer	28 April 1971	SPÖ		Styria		
	Julia Herr	28 November 1992	SPÖ				
	Bernhard Herzog	25 November 1984	SPÖ				
	Heinrich Himmer	24 December 1978	SPÖ				
	Markus Hofer	26 September 1971	NEOS	4 – Upper Austria	Upper Austria		
	Ines Holzegger	3 June 1993	NEOS	9 – Vienna	Vienna		
	Douglas Hoyos	8 September 1990	NEOS	Federal list			
	Bernhard Höfler	1986	SPÖ				
	Franz Jantscher	7 February 1969	SPÖ		Styria		
	Janos Juvan	4 January 1985	NEOS	Federal list			
	Werner Kogler						
	Wolfgang Kocevar	28 October 1969	SPÖ				
	Markus Koza		GRÜNE				
	Kai Jan Krainer	9 September 1968	SPÖ				
	Stephanie Krisper	24 May 1980	NEOS	9 – Vienna	Vienna		
	Philip Kucher		SPÖ				
	Silvia Kumpan-Takacs		SPÖ				
	Maximilian Köllner		SPÖ				
	Robert Laimer		SPÖ				
	Mario Lindner		SPÖ				
	Sigrid Maurer		GRÜNE				
	Wolfgang Moitzi		SPÖ				
	Barbara Nessler	2 March 1991	GRÜNE	7 – Tyrol	Tyrol		
	Verena Nussbaum		SPÖ				
	Dominik Oberhofer	14 July 1980	NEOS	7 – Tyrol	Tyrol		
	Petra Oberrauner	27 January 1965	SPÖ				
	Agnes Sirkka Prammer	17 November 1977	GRÜNE				
	Christoph Pramhofer	1 June 1983	NEOS	Federal list			
	Ralph Schallmeiner		GRÜNE				
	Sabine Schatz	9 September 1978	SPÖ				
	Nikolaus Scherak	16 October 1986	NEOS	3 – Lower Austria	Lower Austria		
	Jakob Schwarz	2 April 1985	GRÜNE		Styria		
	Yannick Shetty	26 April 1995	NEOS	9 – Vienna	Vienna		
	Paul Stich	23 February 1998	SPÖ				
	David Stögmüller						
	Nicole Sunitsch				Styria		
	Petra Tanzler	21 January 1973	SPÖ				
	Barbara Teiber	5 August 1977	SPÖ				
	Nina Tomaselli		GRÜNE				
	Olga Voglauer		GRÜNE				
	Martina von Künsberg Sarre	17 January 1976	NEOS	3 – Lower Austria	Lower Austria		
	Pia Maria Wieninger	23 July 1982	SPÖ				
	Sophie Wotschke	24 July 1998	NEOS	Federal list			
	Peter Wurm	23 February 1965	FPÖ				
	Selma Yildirim	25 August 1969	SPÖ	7 – Tyrol	Tyrol		
	Alma Zadić	24 May 1984	GRÜNE	9 – Vienna	Vienna		
	Wolfgang Zanger		FPÖ	6D – Upper Styria	Styria		
	Christoph Zarits		ÖVP				
	Bettina Zopf		ÖVP				
	Süleyman Zorba		GRÜNE				

== See also ==
- Politics of Austria
