= List of members of the 27th National Council of Austria =

27th National Council
←	26th	28th	→
- Composition of the 27th National Council. Top: Composition at constitution. Bottom: Current composition.

Overview
- Legislative body: National Council
- Jurisdiction: Austria
- Meeting place: Redoute Wing (provisionally); Hofburg Imperial Palace, Vienna
- Term: 23 October 2019 – September 2024
- Election: 29 September 2019
- Government: Second Kurz government (until 2021); Schallenberg government
- Members: 183
- President: Wolfgang Sobotka (ÖVP)
- Second President: Doris Bures (SPÖ)
- Third President: Norbert Hofer (FPÖ)

This is a list of members of the 27th National Council (German: Nationalrat) of Austria, the lower house of the bicameral legislature. The 27th National Council was elected in the 29 September 2019 legislative election, and was constituted in its first session on 23 October 2019.

Originally, the National Council comprised 71 members of the Austrian People's Party (ÖVP), 40 members of the Social Democratic Party of Austria (SPÖ), 31 members of the Freedom Party of Austria (FPÖ), 26 members of The Greens – The Green Alternative (GRÜNE), and 15 members of NEOS – The New Austria and Liberal Forum (NEOS). In the constituent session of the National Council on 23 October 2019, Philippa Strache was expelled from the FPÖ. She has since sat as a non-attached member. As a result, the FPÖ group consists of 30 members.

The President of the National Council was Wolfgang Sobotka (ÖVP). The Second President is Doris Bures (SPÖ), and the Third President is Norbert Hofer (FPÖ).

This session was dissolved before the 2024 Austrian legislative election.

== Presidium ==
President		Party	Term
President	Wolfgang Sobotka	ÖVP	23 Oct. 2019 – present
Second President	Doris Bures	SPÖ	23 Oct. 2019 – present
Third President	Norbert Hofer	FPÖ	23 Oct. 2019 – present
Source: National Council

== Parliamentary groups ==
Group	Members		Leader	
Group	At election	Current	Leader	
Austrian People's Party (ÖVP)	71 / 183	71 / 183	August Wöginger	23 Oct. 2019 – 11 Oct. 2021
Austrian People's Party (ÖVP)	71 / 183	71 / 183	Sebastian Kurz	11 Oct. 2021 – 8 Dec. 2021
Austrian People's Party (ÖVP)	71 / 183	71 / 183	August Wöginger	8 Dec. 2021 – present
Social Democratic Party of Austria (SPÖ)	40 / 183	40 / 183	Pamela Rendi-Wagner	23 Oct. 2019 – present
Freedom Party of Austria (FPÖ)	31 / 183	30 / 183	Herbert Kickl	23 Oct. 2019 – present
The Greens – The Green Alternative (GRÜNE)	26 / 183	26 / 183	Sigrid Maurer	23 Oct. 2019 – present
NEOS – The New Austria and Liberal Forum (NEOS)	15 / 183	15 / 183	Beate Meinl-Reisinger	23 Oct. 2019 – present
No group affiliation	0 / 183	1 / 183	–	–
Source: National Council

== List of members ==
Image	Name	Date of birth	Party	Constituency	State	Notes	Ref.
	Hannes Amesbauer	18 April 1981	FPÖ	6D – Upper Styria	Styria		
	Erwin Angerer	30 December 1964	FPÖ	2 – Carinthia	Carinthia		
	Angela Baumgartner	20 May 1969	ÖVP	3G – Lower Austria East	Lower Austria		
	Petra Bayr	28 April 1968	SPÖ	9D – Vienna South	Vienna		
	Ruth Becher	28 January 1956	SPÖ	9G – Vienna North	Vienna		
	Dagmar Belakowitsch	24 August 1968	FPÖ	9 – Vienna	Vienna		
	Nikolaus Berlakovich	4 June 1961	ÖVP	1B – Burgenland South	Burgenland		
	Michael Bernhard	30 April 1981	NEOS	Federal list	Federal list		
	Eva Blimlinger	12 September 1961	GRÜNE	9 – Vienna	Vienna		
	Reinhard Eugen Bösch	16 January 1957	FPÖ	8 – Vorarlberg	Vorarlberg		
	Helmut Brandstätter	24 April 1955	NEOS	Federal list	Federal list		
	Henrike Brandstötter	13 October 1975	NEOS	Federal list	Federal list		
	Lukas Brandweiner	28 May 1989	ÖVP	3B – Waldviertel	Lower Austria		
	Hermann Brückl	3 November 1968	FPÖ	4B – Innviertel	Upper Austria		
	Doris Bures	3 August 1962	SPÖ	9E – Vienna South-West	Vienna	Second President of the National Council	
	Georg Bürstmayr	20 April 1963	GRÜNE	Federal list	Federal list	Moved up on 9 January 2020 after the resignation of Alma Zadić	
	Romana Deckenbacher	14 January 1967	ÖVP	9 – Vienna	Vienna	Moved up on 9 January 2020 after the resignation of Gernot Blümel	
	Gerhard Deimek	9 January 1963	FPÖ	4 – Upper Austria	Upper Austria		
	Martina Diesner-Wais	10 February 1968	ÖVP	3B – Waldviertel	Lower Austria		
	Meri Disoski	4 October 1982	GRÜNE	9 – Vienna	Vienna		
	Karin Doppelbauer	2 March 1975	NEOS	4 – Upper Austria	Upper Austria		
	Christian Drobits	7 February 1968	SPÖ	1 – Burgenland	Burgenland		
	Cornelia Ecker	27 February 1976	SPÖ	5 – Salzburg	Salzburg		
	Rosa Ecker	10 April 1969	FPÖ	4E – Mühlviertel	Upper Austria		
	Reinhold Einwallner	13 May 1973	SPÖ	8 – Vorarlberg	Vorarlberg		
	Faika El-Nagashi	3 September 1976	GRÜNE	9 – Vienna	Vienna		
	Martin Engelberg	13 March 1960	ÖVP	Federal list	Federal list		
	Melanie Erasim	23 January 1983	SPÖ	3 – Lower Austria	Lower Austria	Moved up on 15 April 2021 after the resignation of Sonja Hammerschmid	
	Ewa Ernst-Dziedzic	16 June 1980	GRÜNE	9E – Vienna South-West	Vienna		
	Franz Eßl	19 July 1957	ÖVP	5C – Lungau-Pinzgau-Pongau	Salzburg		
	Felix Eypeltauer	3 July 1992	NEOS	4 – Upper Austria	Upper Austria		
	Elisabeth Feichtinger	24 September 1987	SPÖ	4D – Traunviertel	Upper Austria	Moved up on 7 January 2021 after the resignation of Markus Vogl	
	Fiona Fiedler	27 January 1976	NEOS	6 – Styria	Styria		
	Ulrike Fischer	2 November 1972	GRÜNE	3 – Lower Austria	Lower Austria		
	Hubert Fuchs	13 January 1969	FPÖ	Federal list	Federal list		
	Klaus Fürlinger	1 June 1965	ÖVP	4A – Greater Linz	Upper Austria		
	Susanne Fürst	3 May 1969	FPÖ	4A – Greater Linz	Upper Austria		
	Hermann Gahr	15 July 1960	ÖVP	7B – Innsbruck Rural	Tyrol		
	Wolfgang Gerstl	14 October 1961	ÖVP	9E – Vienna South-West	Vienna		
	Ernst Gödl	28 December 1971	ÖVP	6A – Greater Graz	Styria		
	Elisabeth Götze	19 March 1966	GRÜNE	3 – Lower Austria	Lower Austria		
	Martin Graf	11 May 1960	FPÖ	9G – Vienna North	Vienna		
	Tanja Graf	7 May 1975	ÖVP	5B – Flachgau-Tennengau	Salzburg		
	Heike Grebien	31 July 1987	GRÜNE	6A – Greater Graz	Styria	Moved up on 9 January 2020 after the resignation of Werner Kogler	
	Karin Greiner	4 November 1967	SPÖ	6 – Styria	Styria		
	Maria Großbauer	25 May 1980	ÖVP	Federal list	Federal list		
	Kira Grünberg	13 August 1993	ÖVP	Federal list	Federal list		
	Christian Hafenecker	11 August 1980	FPÖ	3D – Lower Austria Centre	Lower Austria		
	Sibylle Hamann	14 August 1966	GRÜNE	Federal list	Federal list		
	Lukas Hammer	25 May 1983	GRÜNE	9F – Vienna North-West	Vienna		
	Michael Hammer	3 June 1977	ÖVP	4E – Mühlviertel	Upper Austria		
	Andreas Hanger	19 June 1968	ÖVP	3C – Mostviertel	Lower Austria		
	Peter Haubner	2 January 1960	ÖVP	5B – Flachgau-Tennengau	Salzburg		
	Gerald Hauser	30 September 1961	FPÖ	7 – Tyrol	Tyrol		
	Josef Hechenberger	2 October 1974	ÖVP	7C – Lowland	Tyrol		
	Gabriele Heinisch-Hosek	16 December 1961	SPÖ	Federal list	Federal list		
	Julia Elisabeth Herr	28 November 1992	SPÖ	Federal list	Federal list		
	Eva-Maria Himmelbauer	24 December 1986	ÖVP	3A – Weinviertel	Lower Austria		
	Hans Stefan Hintner	18 January 1964	ÖVP	3F – Thermenregion	Lower Austria		
	Norbert Hofer	2 March 1971	FPÖ	Federal list	Federal list	Third President of the National Council Chairman of the Freedom Party of Austria (until 7 Jun. 2021)	
	Manfred Hofinger	27 February 1970	ÖVP	4B – Innviertel	Upper Austria		
	Johann Höfinger	18 July 1969	ÖVP	3D – Lower Austria Centre	Lower Austria		
	Eva Maria Holzleitner	5 May 1993	SPÖ	4 – Upper Austria	Upper Austria		
	Franz Hörl	4 December 1956	ÖVP	7 – Tyrol	Tyrol		
	Douglas Hoyos-Trauttmansdorff	8 September 1990	NEOS	Federal list	Federal list		
	Johanna Jachs	16 October 1991	ÖVP	4E – Mühlviertel	Upper Austria		
	Carmen Jeitler-Cincelli	27 July 1980	ÖVP	3F – Thermenregion	Lower Austria		
	Alois Kainz	22 May 1964	FPÖ	3 – Lower Austria	Lower Austria		
	Gerhard Kaniak	6 March 1979	FPÖ	4C – Hausruckviertel	Upper Austria		
	Axel Kassegger	4 January 1966	FPÖ	6A – Greater Graz	Styria		
	Martina Kaufmann	7 January 1986	ÖVP	6A – Greater Graz	Styria	Elected for constituency 6 – Styria Moved up to constituency 6A on 18 December after the resignation of Juliane Bogner-Strauß Replaced by Josef Smolle in constituency 6 – Styria	
	Dietmar Keck	27 April 1957	SPÖ	4A – Greater Linz	Upper Austria		
	Herbert Kickl	19 October 1968	FPÖ	Federal list	Federal list	Chairman of the Freedom Party of Austria (since 7 Jun. 2021) Chairman of the FPÖ parliamentary group	
	Rebecca Kirchbaumer	25 August 1974	ÖVP	7B – Innsbruck Rural	Tyrol		
	Klaus Köchl	28 November 1961	SPÖ	2 – Carinthia	Carinthia		
	Maximilian Köllner	25 August 1991	SPÖ	1A – Burgenland North	Burgenland		
	Andreas Kollross	8 January 1971	SPÖ	3F – Thermenregion	Lower Austria		
	Karlheinz Kopf	27 June 1957	ÖVP	8B – Vorarlberg South	Vorarlberg		
	Markus Koza	12 December 1970	GRÜNE	Federal list	Federal list		
	Kai Jan Krainer	9 September 1968	SPÖ	9 – Vienna	Vienna		
	Stephanie Krisper	24 May 1980	NEOS	9 – Vienna	Vienna		
	Katharina Kucharowits	19 September 1983	SPÖ	3G – Lower Austria East	Lower Austria		
	Philip Kucher	29 September 1981	SPÖ	2 – Carinthia	Carinthia		
	Gudrun Kugler	12 November 1976	ÖVP	9G – Vienna North	Vienna		
	Andreas Kühberger	24 April 1974	ÖVP	6D – Upper Styria	Styria		
	Martina Künsberg Sarre	17 January 1976	NEOS	3 – Lower Austria	Lower Austria		
	Andrea Kuntzl	31 March 1958	SPÖ	9 – Vienna	Vienna		
	Robert Laimer	3 August 1966	SPÖ	3D – Lower Austria Centre	Lower Austria		
	Christian Lausch	2 December 1969	FPÖ	3 – Lower Austria	Lower Austria		
	Jörg Leichtfried	18 June 1967	SPÖ	6 – Styria	Styria		
	Max Lercher	24 September 1986	SPÖ	6D – Upper Styria	Styria		
	Klaus Lindinger	22 October 1988	ÖVP	4C – Hausruckviertel	Upper Austria		
	Mario Lindner	30 March 1982	SPÖ	Federal list	Federal list	Moved up on 1 April 2021 after the resignation of Thomas Drozda	
	Martin Litschauer	19 November 1974	GRÜNE	3 – Lower Austria	Lower Austria		
	Gerald Loacker	28 November 1973	NEOS	8 – Vorarlberg	Vorarlberg		
	Reinhold Lopatka	27 January 1960	ÖVP	6B – East Styria	Styria		
	Karl Mahrer	4 March 1955	ÖVP	9 – Vienna	Vienna		
	Nico Marchetti	19 February 1990	ÖVP	9D – Vienna South	Vienna		
	Johannes Margreiter	26 February 1958	NEOS	7 – Tyrol	Tyrol		
	Christoph Matznetter	8 June 1959	SPÖ	9 – Vienna	Vienna		
	Sigrid Maurer	19 March 1985	GRÜNE	9 – Vienna	Vienna	Chairwoman of the Greens parliamentary group	
	Beate Meinl-Reisinger	25 April 1978	NEOS	9 – Vienna	Vienna	Chairwoman of NEOS – The New Austria and Liberal Forum Chairwoman of the NEOS parliamentary group	
	Axel Melchior	21 October 1981	ÖVP	Federal list	Federal list		
	Andreas Minnich	2 October 1974	ÖVP	3A – Weinviertel	Lower Austria		
	Josef Muchitsch	21 August 1967	SPÖ	6 – Styria	Styria		
	Edith Mühlberghuber	22 October 1964	FPÖ	3 – Lower Austria	Lower Austria		
	Barbara Neßler	2 March 1991	GRÜNE	7 – Tyrol	Tyrol		
	Irene Neumann-Hartberger	17 December 1974	ÖVP	Federal list	Federal list	Initially moved up on 9 January 2020 after the resignation of Sebastian Kurz Resigned on 13 October 2021 and replaced by Kurz Moved up on 8 December 2021 after the second resignation of Kurz	
	Therese Niss	31 July 1977	ÖVP	9 – Vienna	Vienna		
	Verena Nussbaum	19 February 1970	SPÖ	6A – Greater Graz	Styria		
	Gabriel Obernosterer	13 May 1955	ÖVP	2C – Carinthia West	Carinthia		
	Petra Oberrauner	27 January 1965	SPÖ	2 – Carinthia	Carinthia		
	Friedrich Ofenauer	9 January 1973	ÖVP	3D – Lower Austria Centre	Lower Austria		
	Andreas Ottenschläger	7 May 1975	ÖVP	9F – Vienna North-West	Vienna		
	Elisabeth Pfurtscheller	6 March 1964	ÖVP	7D – Highland	Tyrol		
	Claudia Plakolm	10 December 1994	ÖVP	4 – Upper Austria	Upper Austria		
	Laurenz Pöttinger	25 September 1964	ÖVP	4C – Hausruckviertel	Upper Austria		
	Agnes Sirkka Prammer	17 November 1977	GRÜNE	4A – Greater Linz	Upper Austria	Moved up on 9 January 2020 after the resignation of Leonore Gewessler	
	Nikolaus Prinz	25 July 1962	ÖVP	4 – Upper Austria	Upper Austria		
	Christian Ragger	20 February 1973	FPÖ	2 – Carinthia	Carinthia		
	Walter Rauch	7 February 1978	FPÖ	6B – East Styria	Styria		
	Volker Reifenberger	5 April 1979	FPÖ	5 – Salzburg	Salzburg		
	Michel Reimon	11 July 1971	GRÜNE	Federal list	Federal list		
	Carina Reiter	22 November 1988	ÖVP	5C – Lungau-Pinzgau-Pongau	Salzburg		
	Pamela Rendi-Wagner	7 May 1971	SPÖ	Federal list	Federal list	Chairwoman of the Social Democratic Party of Austria Chairwoman of the SPÖ parliamentary group	
	Bedrana Ribo	25 November 1981	GRÜNE	6 – Styria	Styria		
	Christian Ries	20 January 1972	FPÖ	1 – Burgenland	Burgenland		
	Astrid Rössler	7 May 1959	GRÜNE	5 – Salzburg	Salzburg		
	Gertraud Salzmann	18 June 1964	ÖVP	5 – Salzburg	Salzburg		
	Werner Saxinger	22 February 1966	ÖVP	Federal list	Federal list	Moved up on 1 April 2020 after the resignation of Josef Moser	
	Ralph Schallmeiner	21 April 1976	GRÜNE	4C – Hausruckviertel	Upper Austria		
	Corinna Scharzenberger	24 June 1990	ÖVP	6D – Upper Styria	Styria		
	Sabine Schatz	9 September 1978	SPÖ	4E – Mühlviertel	Upper Austria		
	Nikolaus Scherak	16 October 1986	NEOS	3 – Lower Austria	Lower Austria		
	Elisabeth Scheucher-Pichler	28 February 1954	ÖVP	2A – Klagenfurt	Carinthia		
	Karl Schmidhofer	6 May 1962	ÖVP	6 – Styria	Styria		
	Peter Schmiedlechner	16 September 1982	FPÖ	3 – Lower Austria	Lower Austria		
	Johannes Schmuckenschlager	20 September 1978	ÖVP	3 – Lower Austria	Lower Austria		
	Joachim Schnabel	10 August 1976	ÖVP	6C – West Styria	Styria		
	Michael Schnedlitz	13 March 1984	FPÖ	3 – Lower Austria	Lower Austria		
	Philipp Schrangl	14 March 1985	FPÖ	Federal list	Federal list		
	Alois Schroll	13 March 1968	SPÖ	3C – Mostviertel	Lower Austria		
	Gabriela Schwarz	3 September 1962	ÖVP	Federal list	Federal list		
	Jakob Schwarz	2 April 1985	GRÜNE	6 – Styria	Styria		
	Michael Seemayer	17 August 1976	SPÖ	4 – Upper Austria	Upper Austria		
	Julia Seidl	23 July 1981	NEOS	Federal list	Federal list		
	Yannick Shetty	26 April 1995	NEOS	9 – Vienna	Vienna		
	Norbert Sieber	12 January 1969	ÖVP	8A – Vorarlberg North	Vorarlberg		
	Rudolf Silvan	22 September 1967	SPÖ	3 – Lower Austria	Lower Austria		
	Johann Singer	18 January 1958	ÖVP	4D – Traunviertel	Upper Austria		
	Maria Smodics-Neumann	5 April 1970	ÖVP	9 – Vienna	Vienna		
	Josef Smolle	23 August 1958	ÖVP	6 – Styria	Styria	Moved up on 19 December 2019 after the resignation of Juliane Bogner-Strauß	
	Wolfgang Sobotka	5 January 1956	ÖVP	3 – Lower Austria	Lower Austria	President of the National Council	
	Clemens Stammler	31 January 1974	GRÜNE	4 – Upper Austria	Upper Austria	Moved up on 9 January 2020 after the resignation of Stefan Kaineder	
	Christoph Stark	1 April 1963	ÖVP	6B – East Styria	Styria		
	Harald Stefan	12 September 1965	FPÖ	9D – Vienna South	Vienna		
	Petra Steger	4 October 1987	FPÖ	Federal list	Federal list		
	Michaela Steinacker	30 June 1952	ÖVP	3 – Lower Austria	Lower Austria		
	Christian Stocker	20 March 1960	ÖVP	3E – Lower Austria South	Lower Austria		
	Alois Stöger	3 September 1960	SPÖ	4 – Upper Austria	Upper Austria		
	David Stögmüller	1 February 1987	GRÜNE	4 – Upper Austria	Upper Austria		
	Philippa Strache	1 December 1987	Independent	9 – Vienna	Vienna	Elected for the FPÖ, expelled on 23 October 2019.	
	Georg Strasser	29 June 1971	ÖVP	3C – Mostviertel	Lower Austria		
	Alexandra Tanda	9 October 1962	ÖVP	7 – Tyrol	Tyrol	Moved up on 9 January 2020 after the resignation of Margarete Schramböck	
	Rudolf Taschner	30 March 1953	ÖVP	Federal list	Federal list	Moved up on 9 January 2020 after the resignation of Karl Nehammer	
	Nina Tomaselli	16 April 1985	GRÜNE	8 – Vorarlberg	Vorarlberg		
	Agnes Totter	27 May 1974	ÖVP	6B – East Styria	Styria		
	Harald Troch	2 May 1959	SPÖ	9D – Vienna South	Vienna		
	Olga Voglauer	3 October 1980	GRÜNE	2 – Carinthia	Carinthia		
	Petra Vorderwinkler	21 January 1973	SPÖ	3 – Lower Austria	Lower Austria		
	Johann Weber	9 May 1965	ÖVP	2D – Carinthia East	Carinthia		
	Peter Weidinger	21 November 1977	ÖVP	2 – Carinthia	Carinthia	Moved up on 9 January 2020 after the resignation of Elisabeth Köstinger	
	Hermann Weratschnig	26 April 1975	GRÜNE	7 – Tyrol	Tyrol		
	Petra Wimmer	13 December 1965	SPÖ	4C – Hausruckviertel	Upper Austria		
	Rainer Wimmer	10 August 1955	SPÖ	Federal list	Federal list		
	August Wöginger	2 November 1974	ÖVP	4B – Innviertel	Upper Austria	Chairman of the ÖVP parliamentary group (Constitution – 11 Oct. 2021, again since 8 Dec. 2021)	
	Peter Wurm	23 February 1965	FPÖ	7 – Tyrol	Tyrol		
	Selma Yildirim	25 August 1969	SPÖ	7 – Tyrol	Tyrol		
	Nurten Yılmaz	17 September 1957	SPÖ	9F – Vienna North-West	Vienna		
	Wolfgang Zanger	4 December 1968	FPÖ	6 – Styria	Styria		
	Christoph Zarits	16 September 1980	ÖVP	1A – Burgenland North	Burgenland		
	Bettina Zopf	19 July 1974	ÖVP	4D – Traunviertel	Upper Austria		
	Süleyman Zorba	16 June 1993	GRÜNE	3 – Lower Austria	Lower Austria		

== List of former members ==
Image	Name	Date of birth	Party	Constituency	State	Notes	Ref.
	Gernot Blümel	24 October 1981	ÖVP	9 – Vienna	Vienna	Resigned on 7 January 2020 to join Cabinet Kurz II Replaced by Romana Deckenbacher	
	Juliane Bogner-Strauß	3 November 1971	ÖVP	6A – Greater Graz	Styria	Resigned on 18 December 2019 to join the state government of Styria Replaced by Martina Kaufmann	
	Thomas Drozda	24 July 1965	SPÖ	Federal list	Federal list	Resigned on 31 March 2021 Replaced by Mario Lindner	
	Leonore Gewessler	15 September 1977	GRÜNE	4A – Greater Linz	Upper Austria	Resigned on 7 January 2020 to join Cabinet Kurz II Replaced by Agnes Sirkka Prammer	
	Sonja Hammerschmid	24 June 1968	SPÖ	3 – Lower Austria	Lower Austria	Resigned on 14 April 2021 Replaced by Melanie Erasim	
	Stefan Kaineder	22 January 1985	GRÜNE	4 – Upper Austria	Upper Austria	Resigned on 7 January 2020 to join the state government of Upper Austria Replaced by Clemens Stammler	
	Werner Kogler	20 November 1961	GRÜNE	6A – Greater Graz	Styria	Spokesman of The Greens – The Green Alternative Resigned on 7 January 2020 to join Cabinet Kurz II Replaced by Heike Grebien	
	Elisabeth Köstinger	22 November 1978	ÖVP	2 – Carinthia	Carinthia	Resigned on 7 January 2020 to join Cabinet Kurz II Replaced by Peter Weidinger	
	Sebastian Kurz	27 August 1986	ÖVP	Federal list	Federal list	Chairman of the Austrian People's Party (until 3 Dec. 2021) Chairman of the ÖVP parliamentary group (11 Oct. 2021 – 8 Dec. 2021) Initially resigned on 7 January 2020 to join Cabinet Kurz II and replaced by Neumann-Hartberger Moved up on 11 October 2021 after the resignation of Irene Neumann-Hartberger Resigned on 8 Dec. 2021 and replaced by Neumann-Hartberger	
	Josef Moser	6 October 1955	ÖVP	Federal list	Federal list	Resigned on 31 March 2020 Replaced by Werner Saxinger	
	Karl Nehammer	18 October 1972	ÖVP	Federal list	Federal list	Resigned on 7 January 2020 to join Cabinet Kurz II Replaced by Rudolf Taschner	
	Sepp Schellhorn	12 May 1967	NEOS	Federal list	Federal list	Resigned on 31 July 2021 Replaced by Julia Seidl	
	Margarete Schramböck	12 May 1970	ÖVP	7 – Tyrol	Tyrol	Resigned on 7 January 2020 to join Cabinet Kurz II Replaced by Alexandra Tanda	
	Markus Vogl	27 November 1970	SPÖ	4D – Traunviertel	Upper Austria	Resigned on 6 January 2021 to become Vice Mayor of Steyr Replaced by Elisabeth Feichtinger	
	Alma Zadić	24 May 1984	GRÜNE	Federal list	Federal list	Resigned on 7 January 2020 to join Cabinet Kurz II Replaced by Georg Bürstmayr	
