= Eisenhut =

Eisenhut may refer to:

- Gossan or iron hat, the oxidized outcrop of sulfide ore deposits
- Eisenhut (mountain), an Austrian mountain
- A term for a German kettle hat
- German name of the Monkshood plant aconitum

== People ==
- Eugen Eisenhut (1906–1978), German geologist and ornithologist
- Irene Eisenhut (born 1974), Austrian politician
- Kari Eisenhut, Swiss glider pilot, 1999 Paragliding World Cup winner
- Neil Eisenhut (b. 1967), Canadian professional hockey player
- Thomas Eisenhut (1644–1702), German baroque composer
- Minister Eisenhut, leader of 1525 peasant revolt in Bruchsal, Germany
