= Gertraud Auinger-Oberzaucher =

Austrian politician (born 1971)

Member of the National Council
- Incumbent
- Assumed office 24 October 2024
- Constituency: Lower Austria

Personal details
- Born: 21 July 1971 (age 54)
- Party: NEOS

Gertraud Auinger-Oberzaucher (born 21 July 1971) is an Austrian politician of NEOS serving as a member of the National Council since 2024. She has been a municipal councillor of Baden bei Wien since 2020.

== See also ==
- List of members of the 28th National Council of Austria
