= Albert Royer =

Austrian politician (born 1973)

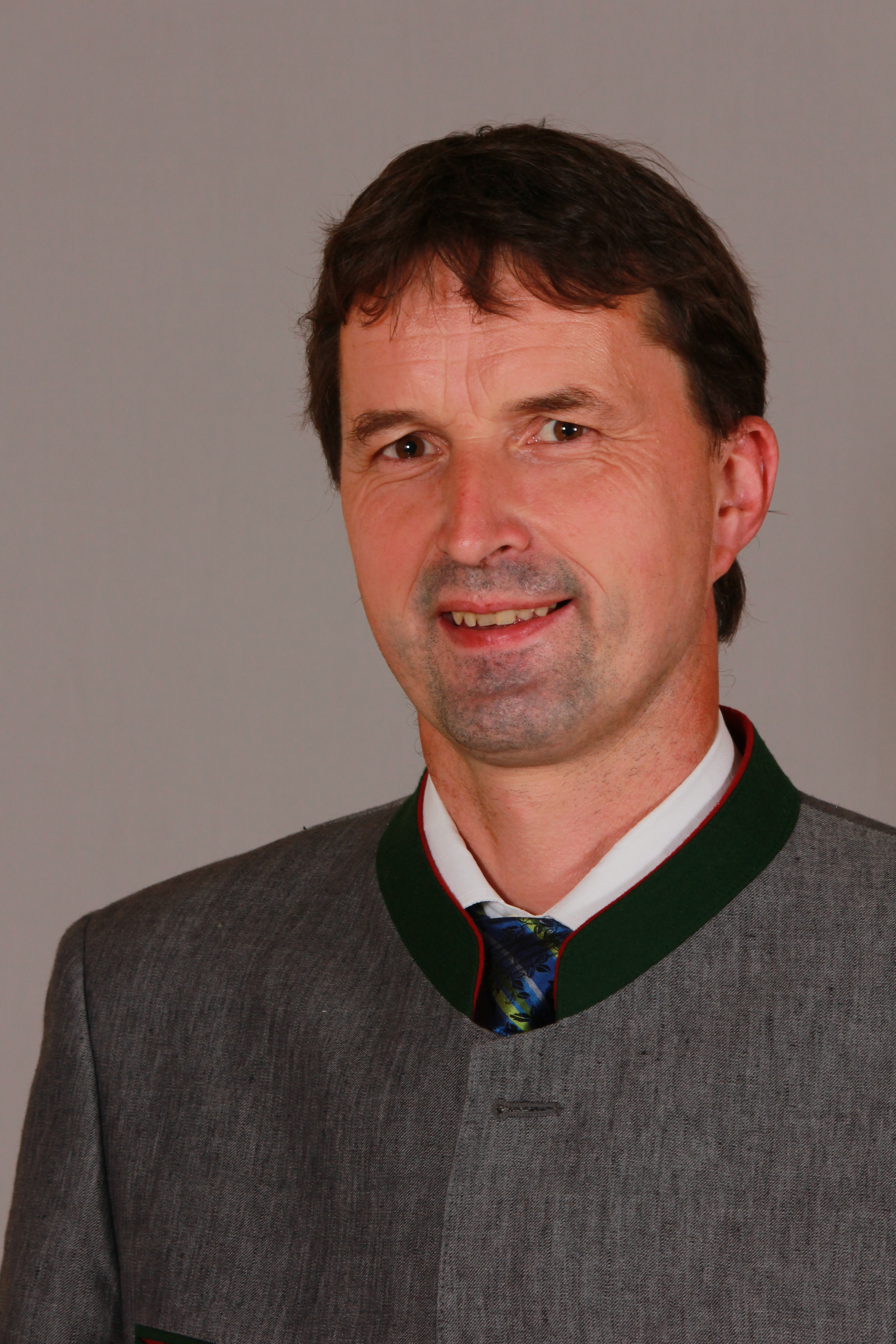
- Royer in 2016

Member of the National Council
- Incumbent
- Assumed office 20 December 2024
- Preceded by: Hannes Amesbauer
- Constituency: Upper Styria

Personal details
- Born: 9 April 1973 (age 53)
- Party: Freedom Party of Austria

Albert Royer (born 9 April 1973) is an Austrian politician serving as a member of the National Council since 2024. From 2015 to 2024, he was a member of the Landtag of Styria.
