= Felix Eypeltauer =

Austrian politician

Member of the National Council
- Incumbent
- Assumed office 23 October 2019

Personal details
- Born: Felix Eypeltauer; 3 July 1992 (age 34) Linz, Austria
- Party: NEOS – The New Austria and Liberal Forum
- Education: Johannes Kepler University Linz

Felix Eypeltauer (born 3 July 1992) is an Austrian politician from NEOS – The New Austria and Liberal Forum. He was sworn in as a member of the National Council on 23 October 2019 following his election in the 2019 Austrian legislative election.

== See also ==
- List of members of the 27th National Council of Austria
