= Katrin Auer =

Austrian politician (born 1974)

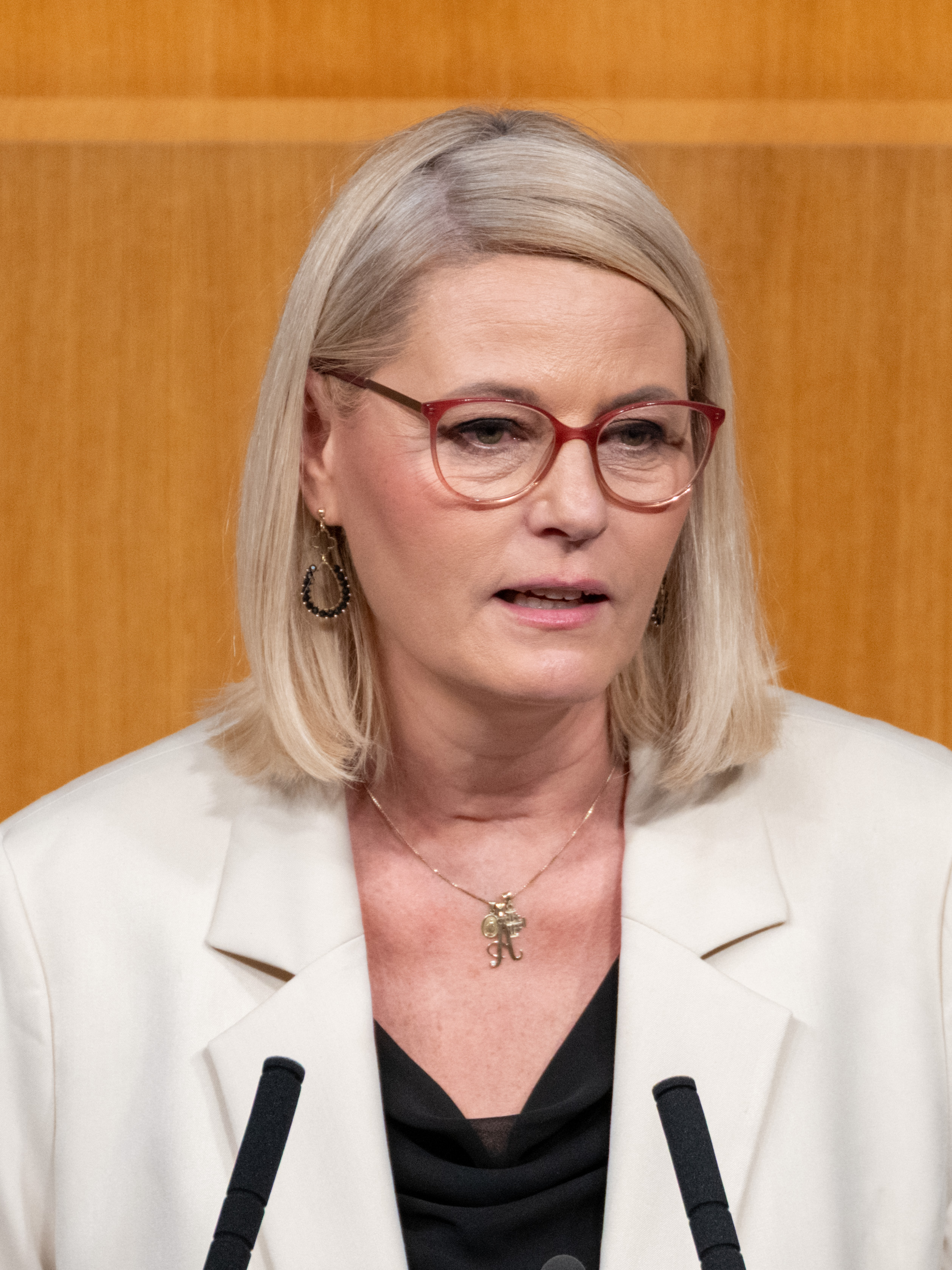
- Katrin Auer in 2026

Member of the National Council
- Incumbent
- Assumed office 24 October 2024
- Constituency: Traunviertel

Personal details
- Born: 30 June 1974 (age 52) Steyr, Austria
- Party: Social Democratic Party
- Education: University of Vienna
- Website: katrin-auer.at

Katrin Auer (born 30 June 1974) is an Austrian politician and member of the National Council. A member of the Social Democratic Party, she has represented Traunviertel since October 2024.

Auer was born on 30 June 1974 in Steyr. She has a diploma in political science and history from the University of Vienna. She also studied business management at the University of Graz. She was a research assistant at the Institute for Conflict Research in Vienna from 2000 to 2004. She was then worked in data management at the Austria Press Agency (2004–2005) and as a freelance historian (2005–2010). She was a management assistant at Auer Reisen GmbH (2010–2012) and managing director of the Museum of Working Life in Steyr (2012–2019). She has been on study leave since 2020.

Auer has held various positions in the Steyr and Steyr Rural District branches of the Social Democratic Party (SPÖ) since 2021. She has been a member of the municipal council in Steyr since November 2021. She was elected to the National Council at the 2024 legislative election.

== Electoral history ==
Electoral history of Katrin Auer
Election	Electoral district	Party	Votes	%	Result
2024 legislative	Traunviertel	Social Democratic Party	4,994	14.36%	Elected
2024 legislative	Upper Austria	Social Democratic Party	278	0.16%	Not elected

== See also ==
- List of members of the 28th National Council of Austria
