= Peter Manfred Harrer =

Austrian politician (born 1971)

Member of the National Council
- Incumbent
- Assumed office 7 March 2025
- Preceded by: Jörg Leichtfried
- Constituency: Styria

Personal details
- Born: 28 April 1971 (age 54)
- Party: Social Democratic Party

Peter Manfred Harrer (born 28 April 1971) is an Austrian politician serving as a member of the National Council since 2025. He has served as deputy mayor of Passail since 2020.
