= Philippa Strache =

Austrian presenter and politician

Pia Philippa Strache
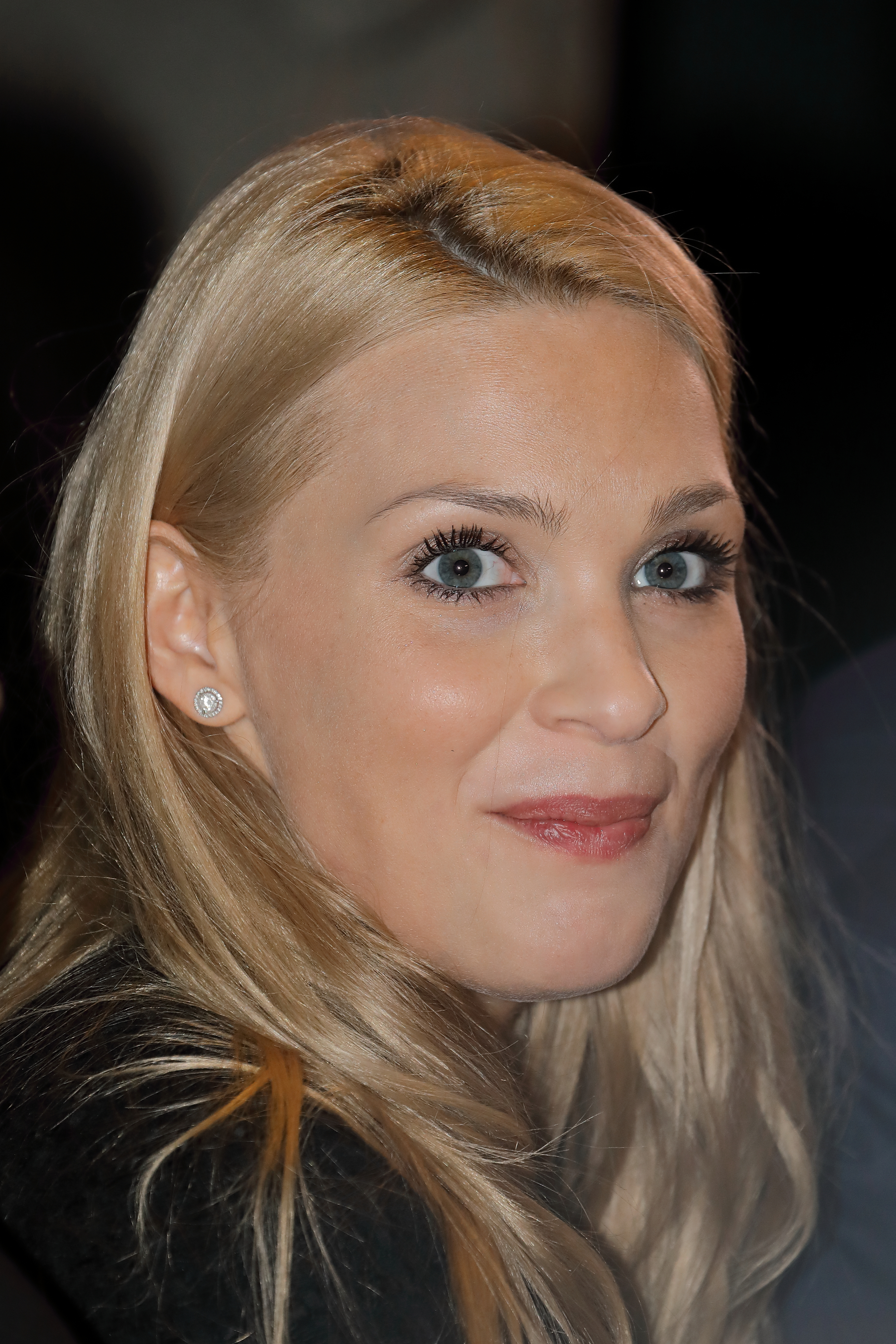

Member of the National Council
- In office 23 October 2019 – 23 October 2024

Personal details
- Born: 1 December 1987 (age 38) Vienna, Austria
- Party: Freedom Party (until October 2019)
- Spouse: Heinz-Christian Strache (m. 2016; div. 2023)
- Children: 1

Pia Philippa Beck (born 1 December 1987 in Vienna, known during her marriage as Philippa Strache) is an Austrian presenter and politician.

== Life ==
Strache was Josef Cap's assistant for five years in the parliamentary club of the SPÖ. Between 2012 and 2013, she worked as spokeswoman for Team Stronach. In 2016, she became presenter for the newly founded news channel oe24.tv. Additionally, she moderated the FPÖ's channel FPÖ TV on YouTube.

Beginning in summer of 2018, Strache served as honorary animal welfare officer of the FPÖ. She was also responsible for Heinz-Christian Strache's social media appearance. Strache is said to have received a salary of €9,500 for these functions.

Strache was an FPÖ candidate for the 2019 National Council elections. Her final entry into parliament was unclear for some time due to discussions about expense reports and the arithmetic of the elections. The discussion generated a broad media response.

On 7 October, the FPÖ announced that Harald Stefan would waive his basic mandate and thus enter the National Council via the national list, which would not have given Strache a mandate. On 9 October 2019 however, Vienna's state election authority announced that Harald Stefan could not waive his basic mandate and that Strache would therefore definitely be entitled to a mandate via the national list. As a result, the federal party chairman Norbert Hofer and the designated club Chairman Herbert Kickl immediately declared that the FPÖ would not include Philippa Strache in their parliamentary club. In the constituent session of the 27th legislative period on 23 October 2019, Strache became a member of the National Council; she was expelled from the FPÖ the same day.

== Personal life ==
Her relationship with Heinz-Christian Strache began in autumn of 2015; they had their first public appearance together in January 2016 at the Jägerball. Their wedding followed on 7 October 2016. On 1 January 2019, she gave birth to their son. The couple divorced in June 2023, when she started using her maiden name again.
