= Passail =

- Municipality
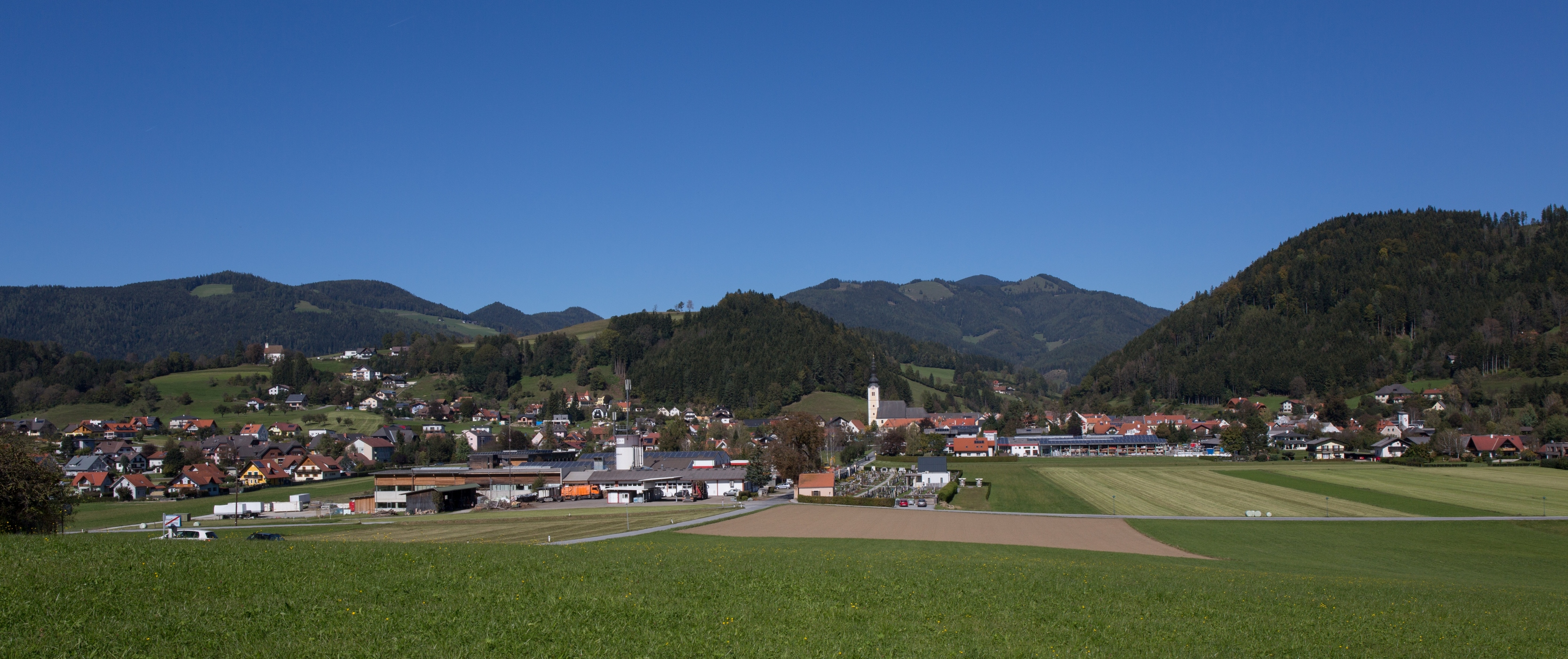
- Passail seen from the south

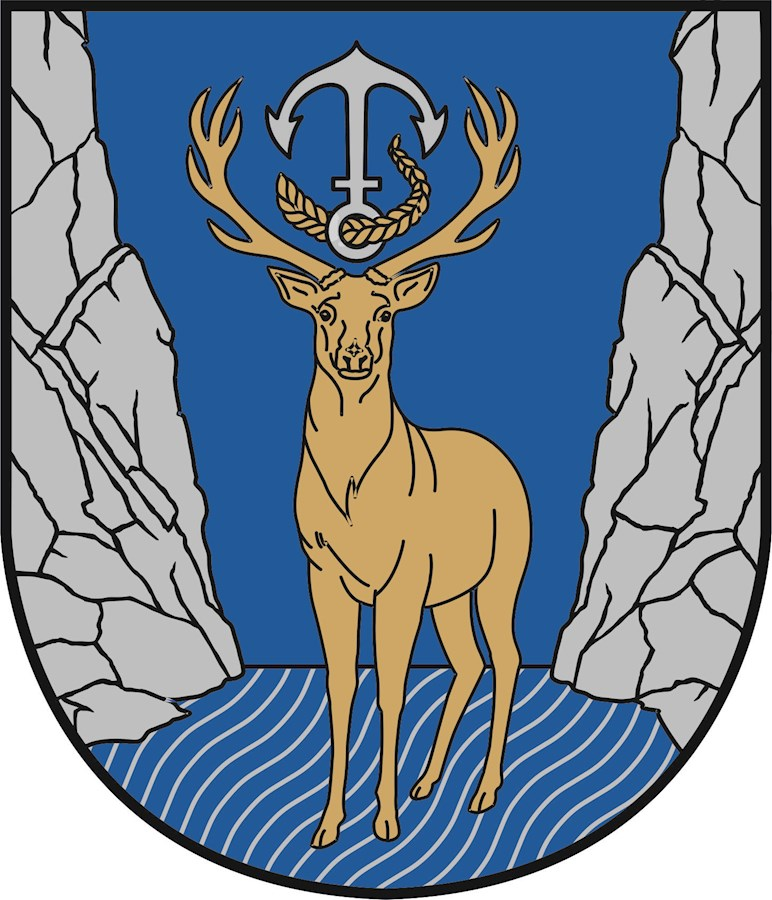
- Coat of arms

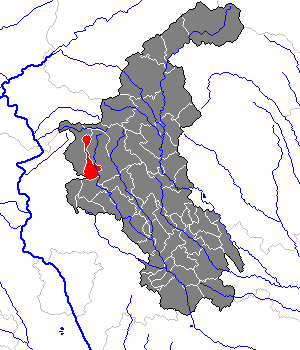
- Location within Weiz district

- Location within Austria
- Coordinates: 47°17′00″N 15°31′00″E
- Country: Austria
- State: Styria
- District: Weiz

Government
  - Mayor: Eva Karrer (SPÖ)

Area
  - Total: 80.18 km^{2} (30.96 sq mi)
- Elevation: 653 m (2,142 ft)

Population (2019-01-01)
  - Total: 4,245
  - Density: 52.94/km^{2} (137.1/sq mi)
- Time zone: UTC+1 (CET)
  - Summer (DST): UTC+2 (CEST)
- Postal code: 8162
- Area code: 03179
- Vehicle registration: WZ
- Website: www.passail.at

Passail is a municipality in the district of Weiz in the Austrian state of Styria. It is situated approximately 30 kilometers (19 mi) north-east of the state capital Graz.
