= Thomas Elian =

Austrian politician (born 1989)

Member of the National Council
- Incumbent
- Assumed office 7 March 2025
- Preceded by: Christian Stocker
- Constituency: Lower Austria South

Personal details
- Born: 3 December 1989 (age 36)
- Party: People's Party

Thomas Elian (born 3 December 1989) is an Austrian politician serving as a member of the National Council since 2025. He has served as chairman of the People's Party in Schwarzau am Steinfeld since 2015.
