= Michael Seemayer =

Austrian politician (born 1976)

Member of the National Council
- Incumbent
- Assumed office 23 October 2019
- Constituency: Upper Austria

Personal details
- Born: 17 August 1976 (age 49)
- Party: Social Democratic Party

Michael Seemayer (born 17 August 1976) is an Austrian trade unionist and politician of the Social Democratic Party. He has been a member of the National Council since 2019, and has served as the Upper Austrian state secretary of PRO-GE since 2018.
