= Süleyman Zorba =

Austrian politician

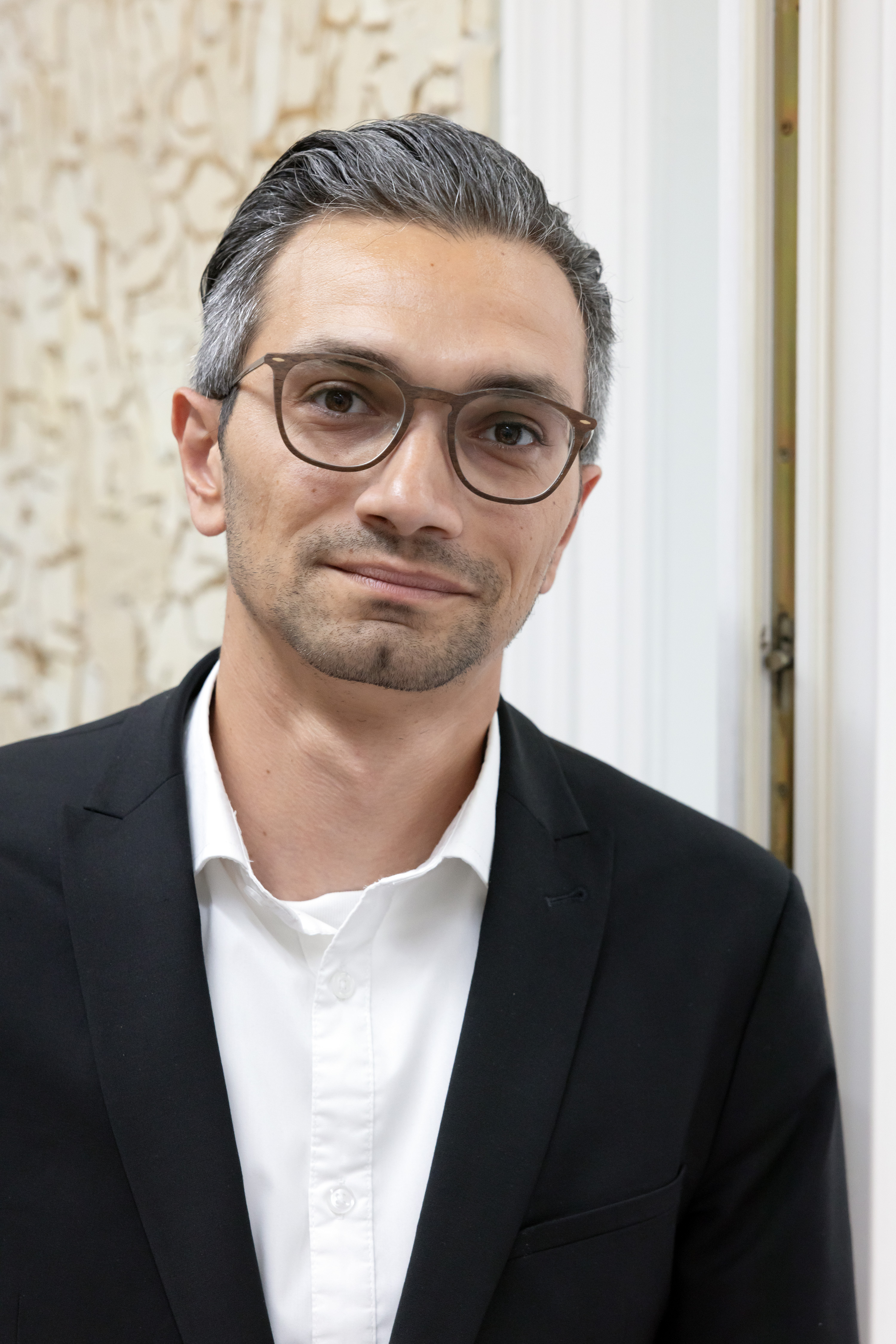
- Süleyman Zorba in 2024

Member of the National Council
- Incumbent
- Assumed office 23 October 2019

Personal details
- Born: Süleyman Zorba; June 16, 1993 (age 31); Sürmene, Turkey
- Political party: The Greens – The Green Alternative

Süleyman Zorba (born 16 June 1993) is an Austrian politician from The Greens – The Green Alternative. He was sworn in as a member of the National Council on 23 October 2019 following his election in the 2019 Austrian legislative election.

== See also ==
- List of members of the 27th National Council of Austria
