= Mario Lindner =

Austrian politician (born 1982)

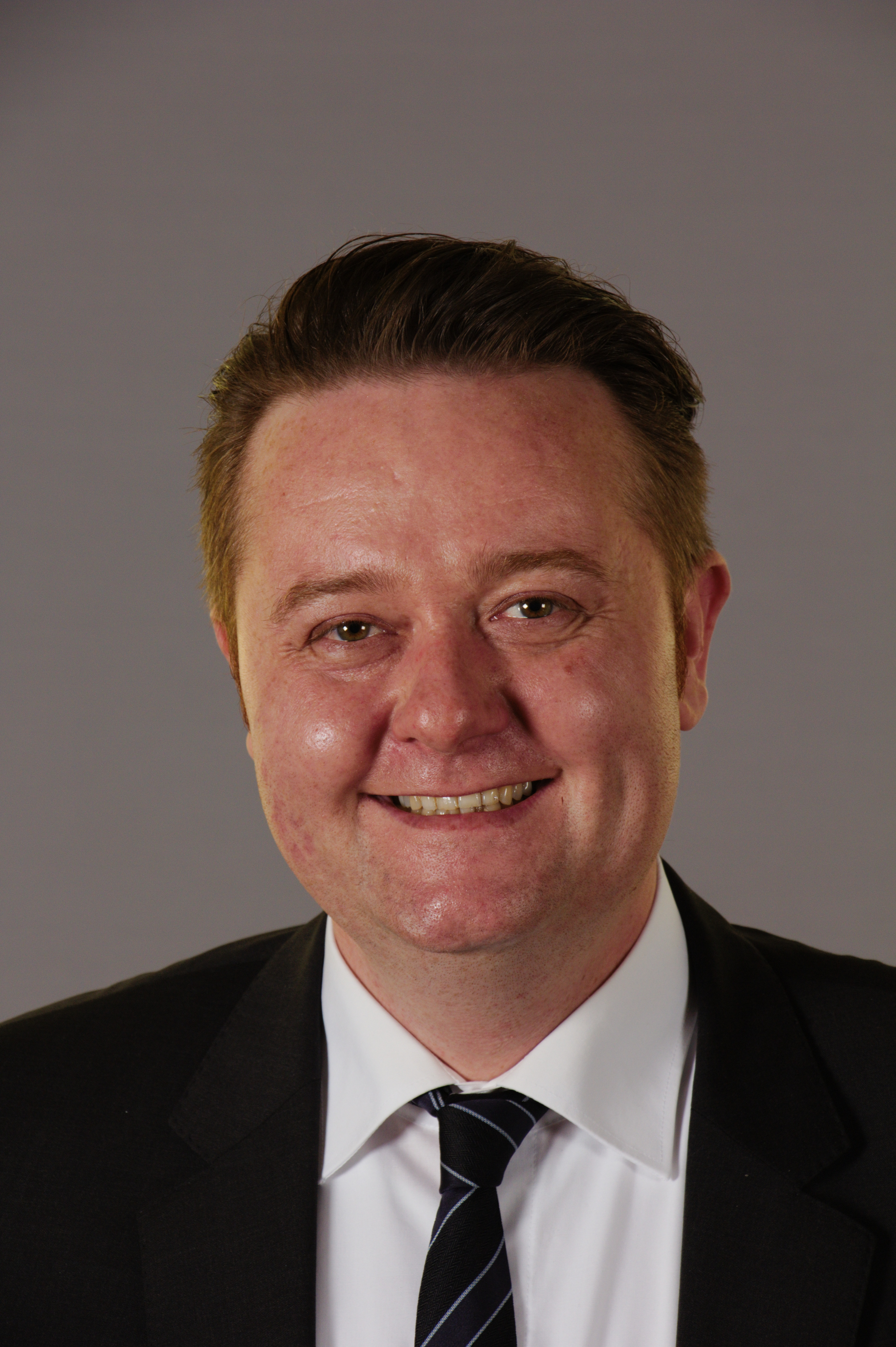
- Lindner in 2017

Member of the National Council
- Incumbent
- Assumed office 1 April 2021
- Preceded by: Thomas Drozda
- Constituency: Federal list
- In office 9 November 2017 – 22 October 2019
- Constituency: Federal list

Member of the Federal Council
- In office 16 June 2015 – 8 November 2017
- Nominated by: Landtag of Styria

Personal details
- Born: 30 March 1982 (age 44)
- Party: Social Democratic Party

Mario Lindner (born 30 March 1982) is an Austrian politician of the Social Democratic Party. He has been member of the National Council since 2021, having previously served from 2017 to 2019. He was a member of the Federal Council from 2015 to 2017, and served as its president in 2016.
