= Fiona Fiedler =

Member of the National Council of Austria

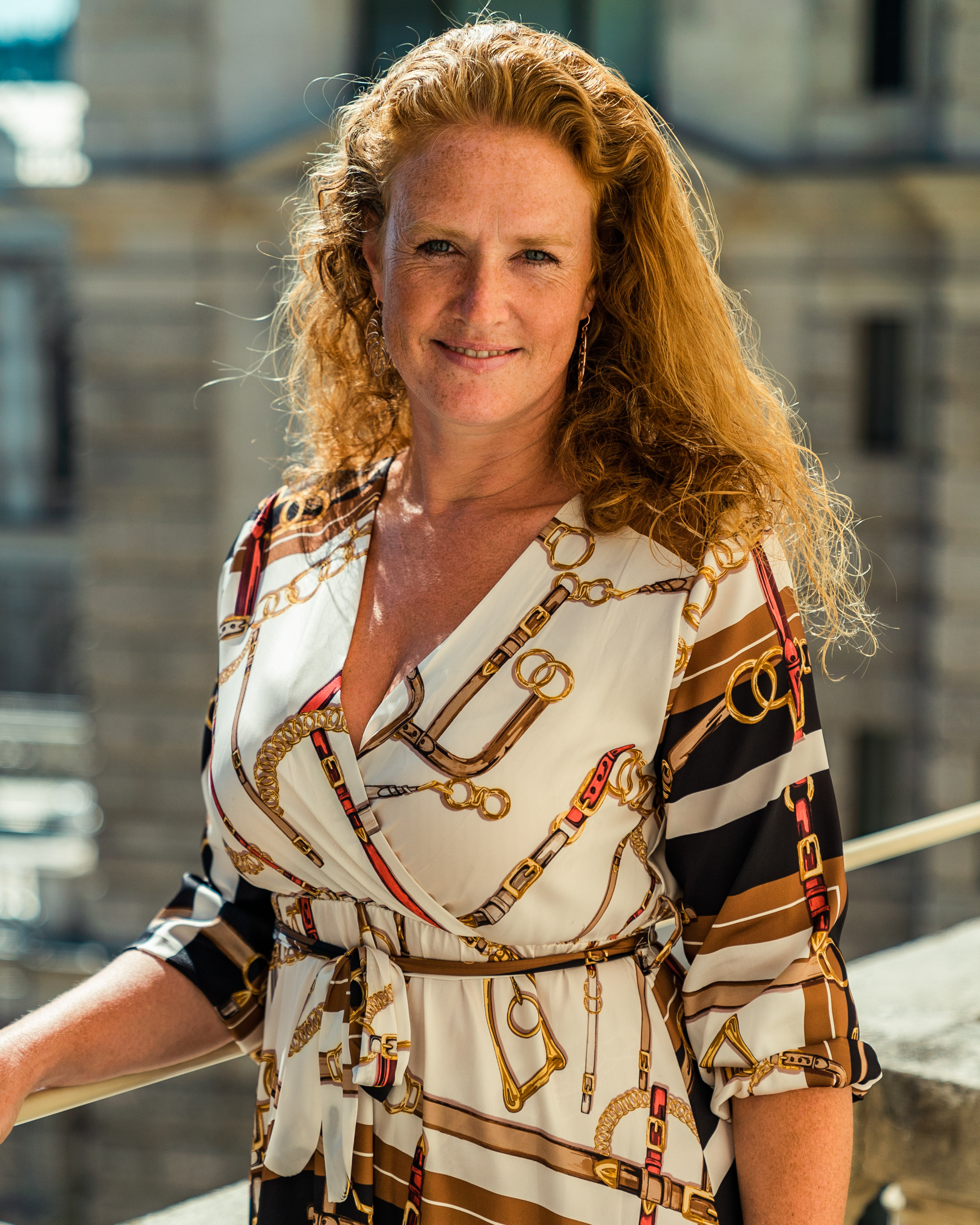
Fiona Fiedler in 2019

Fiona Fiedler (born 27 January 1976) is an Austrian politician of NEOS – The New Austria and Liberal Forum. She has been a member of the National Council since October 23, 2019.

== Life ==
=== Education and profession ===
After elementary school in Salzburg-Herrnau, Fiona Fiedler attended the Bundesgymnasium Nonntal, where she graduated in 1995. She then completed the two-year Salzburg College for Tourism in Kleßheim. From 2013, she studied at the University College of Teacher Education Styria, graduating in 2016 with a Bachelor of Education (BEd). She also began training as a children's choir director at the Johann Joseph Fux Conservatory in Graz. From 2003 to 2009, she worked in the catering industry, and from 2017 she was an elementary school teacher in Styria. Fiedler has lived in Graz since 1998, and is married and the mother of two sons.

=== Politics ===
Since 2019, she has been a member of NEOS, for which she ran as the top candidate in the Styrian state constituency in the 2019 National Council election. On October 23, 2019, she was sworn in as a member of the Austrian National Council at the beginning of the 27th legislative period. In the NEOS parliamentary group, she acts as the area spokesperson for people with disabilities and animal protection.

On January 20, 2022, she voted against the National Council's bill to introduce mandatory COVID-19 vaccination in Austria, but it was approved by a majority of National Council members. For the 2024 Austrian legislative election, she was ranked second on the Styrian NEOS state list behind Veit Dengler.
