= Eugen Eisenhut =

German geologist and ornithologist

Eugen Eisenhut (27 November 1906 – 21 November 1978) was a German geologist and ornithologist. He produced geological maps of Swabia and in his travels also researched the birdlife.

Eisenhut was born in Hochberg am Neckar, the youngest of three children of a pastor. The family moved to Geradstetten where he grew up where he had long hikes into the countryside and even to school. He studied at the Latin school in Schorndorff (1916–1921) and went to secondary school at Göppingen before interning at an engineering workshop. He completed his schooling in 1927 and went to Stuttgart where he wished to work in engineering but the events of 1933 came in the way as he had been a member of a free socialist student group. He met the theology professor Albrecht Ströle and then found employment at the bird observatory in Radolfzell. In 1934 he was arrested in Mettnau on suspicions of treason by the Gestapo. He was held in prison for a few months but let off due to lack of evidence and he continued to work at the bird observatory until it was shut down in 1935. He then worked as a bird taxidermist at the Tübingen Zoological Institute and then as an assistant in the geology department until 1942. He studied and received a doctorate in geology on stratigraphy and tectonics from the University of Tübingen and joined the Elwerath Petroleum Works Union company near Hanover and then to China. He returned to Germany and joined the geological department of the Württemberg Statistical Office where he worked until 1971. Eisenhut was involved in mapping the geology of the Swabian region at a scale of 1:25,000. At the same time he also kept his interests in ornithology and published on the biology of the sparrow and the influence of the level of lake Constance on bird populations.

Eisenhut married Margarete Münsinger in 1942 and they had two daughters. After his retirement he lived in a small house in Korntal.
