= Rudolf Silvan =

Austrian politician (born 1967)

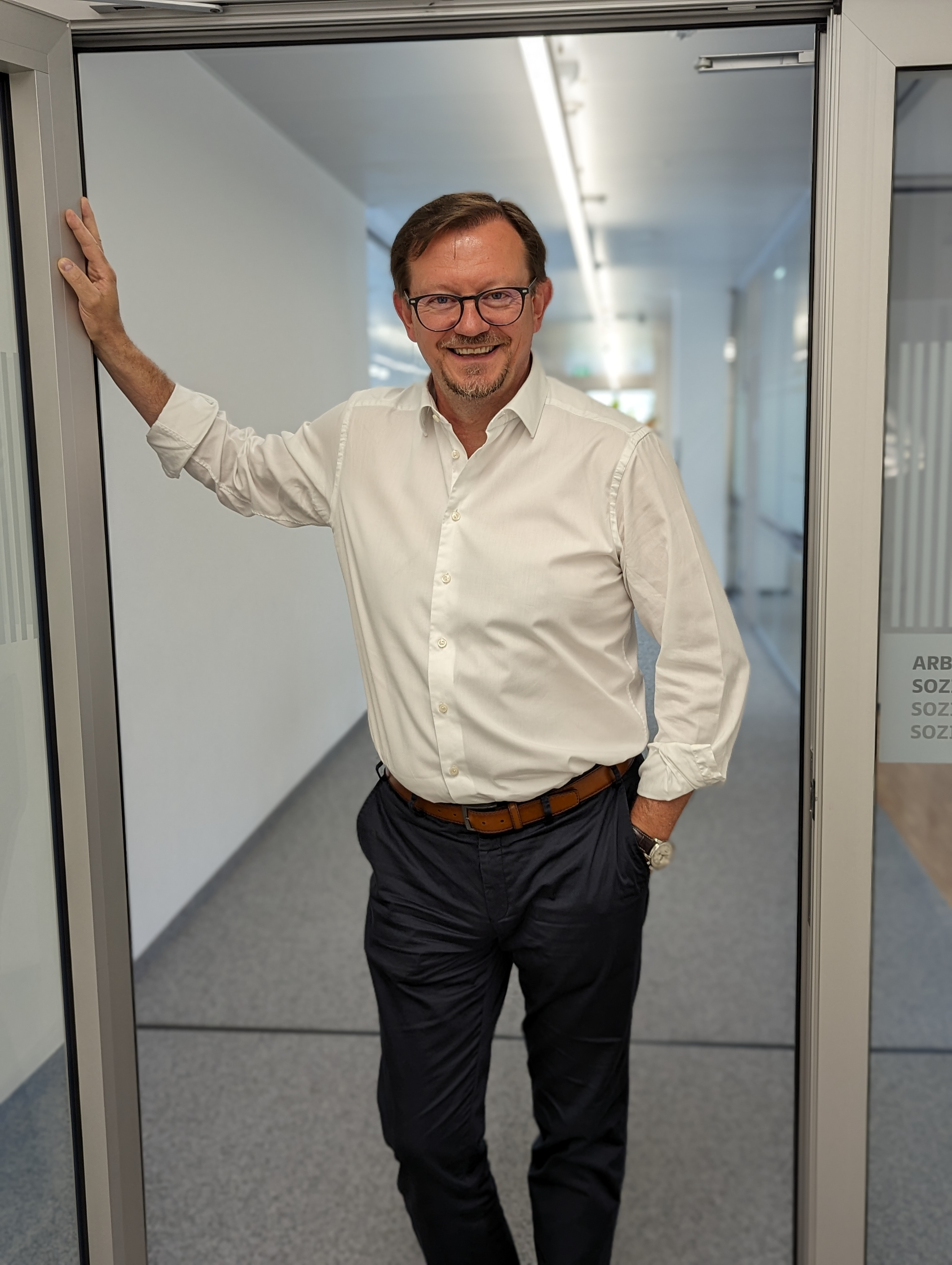
- Silvan in 2024

Member of the National Council
- Incumbent
- Assumed office 23 October 2019
- Constituency: Lower Austria

Personal details
- Born: 22 September 1967 (age 58)
- Party: Social Democratic Party

Rudolf Silvan (born 22 September 1967) is an Austrian politician of the Social Democratic Party serving as a member of the National Council since 2019. Since 2024, he has served as deputy group leader of the Social Democratic Party.
