= Michael Bernhard =

Austrian politician

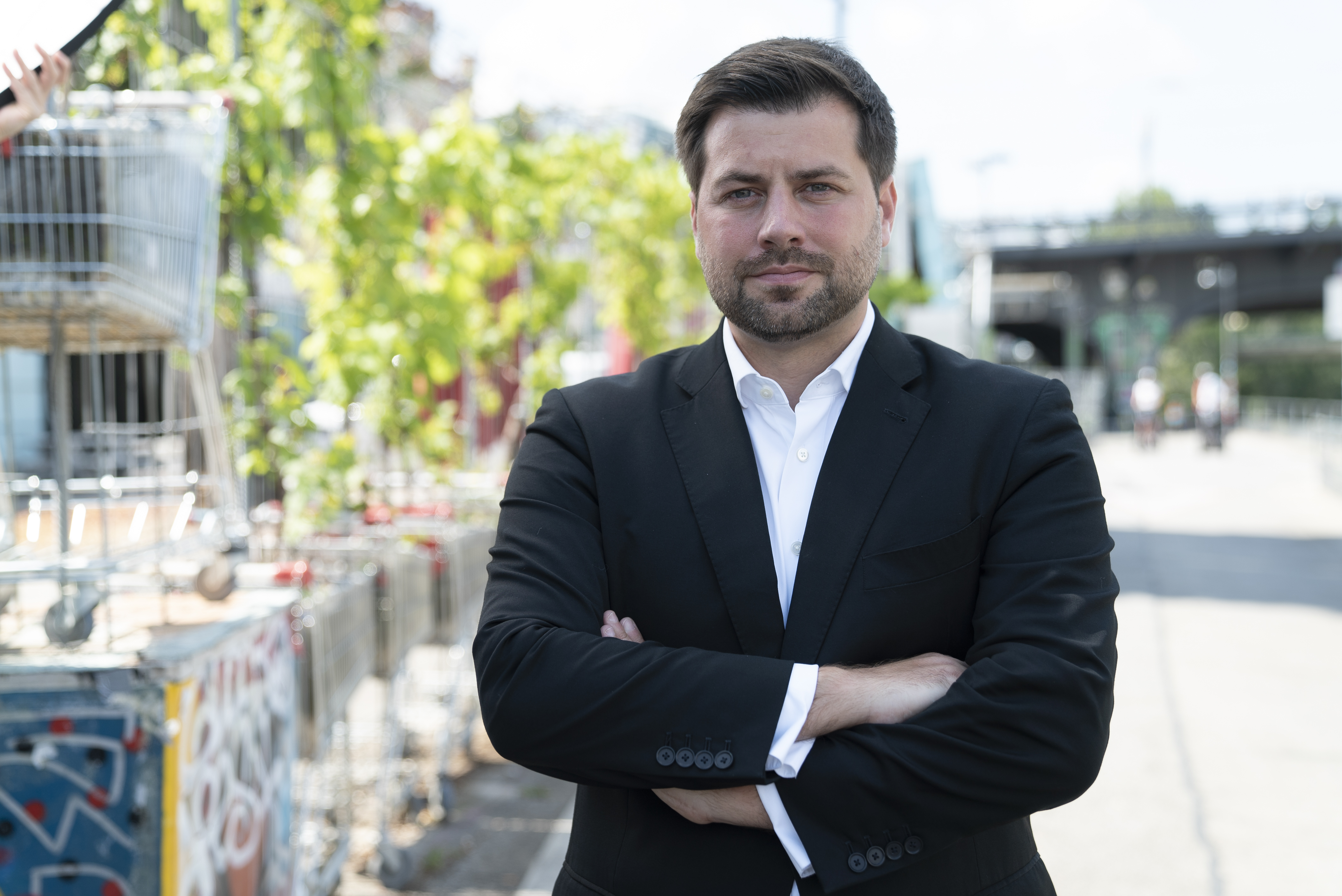
- Michael Bernhard in 2019

Member of the National Council
- Incumbent
- Assumed office 23 October 2019

Personal details
- Born: 30 April 1981 (age 45) Tulln an der Donau, Austria
- Party: NEOS – The New Austria and Liberal Forum

Michael Bernhard (born 30 April 1981) is an Austrian politician from NEOS – The New Austria and Liberal Forum. He was sworn in as a member of the National Council on 23 October 2019 following his election in the 2019 Austrian legislative election.

== See also ==
- List of members of the 27th National Council of Austria
