= Jakob Schwarz =

Austrian politician (born 1985)

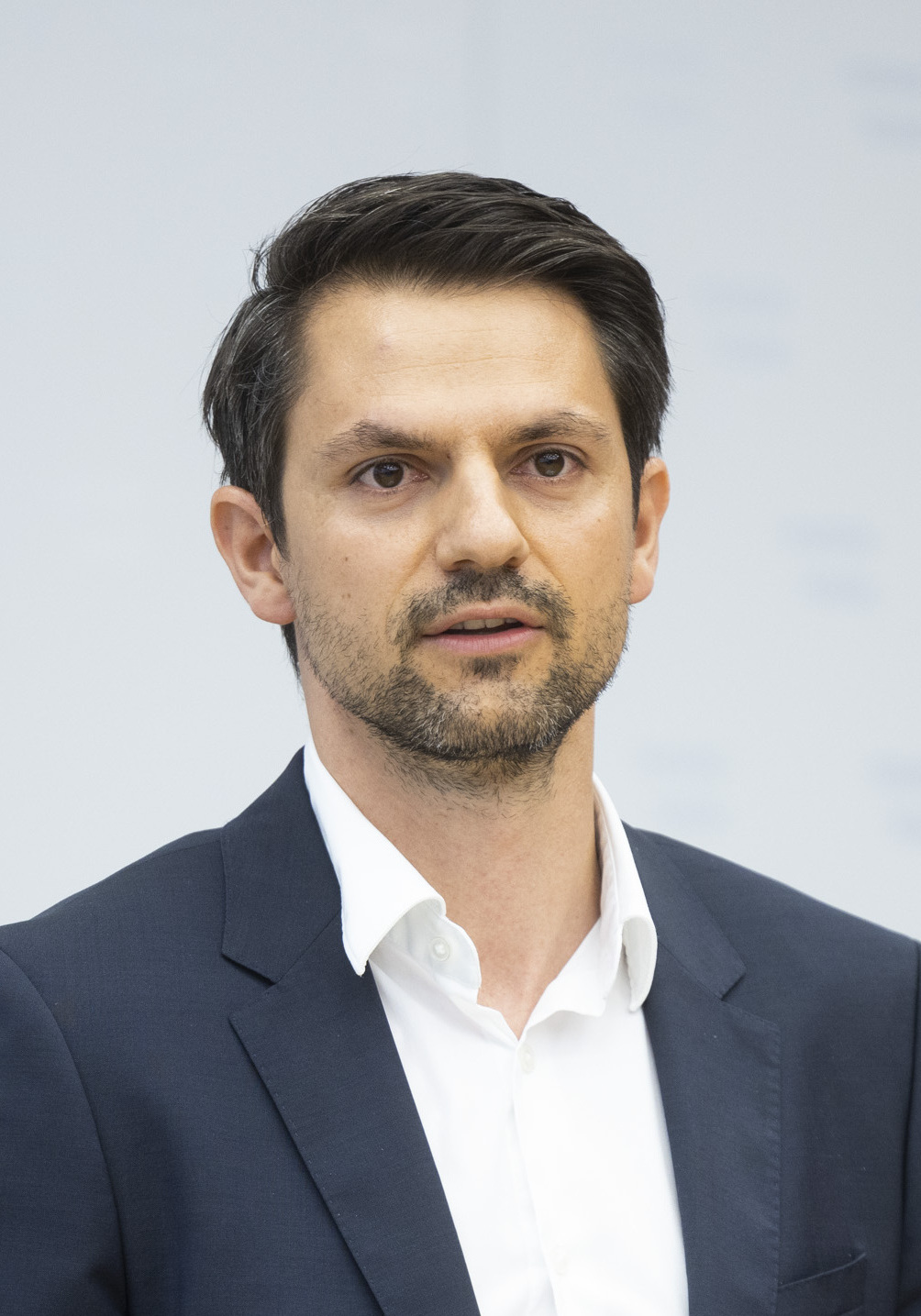
- Schwarz in 2022

Member of the National Council
- Incumbent
- Assumed office 23 October 2019
- Constituency: Styria

Personal details
- Born: 2 April 1985 (age 41)
- Party: The Greens – The Green Alternative (since 2002)

Jakob Schwarz (born 2 April 1985) is an Austrian politician of The Greens. Since 2019, he has been a member of the National Council. He previously served as co-spokesperson of the Federation of Young European Greens, and was a candidate for member of the European Parliament in the 2014 European Parliament election.
