= Olga Voglauer =

Austrian politician (born 1980)

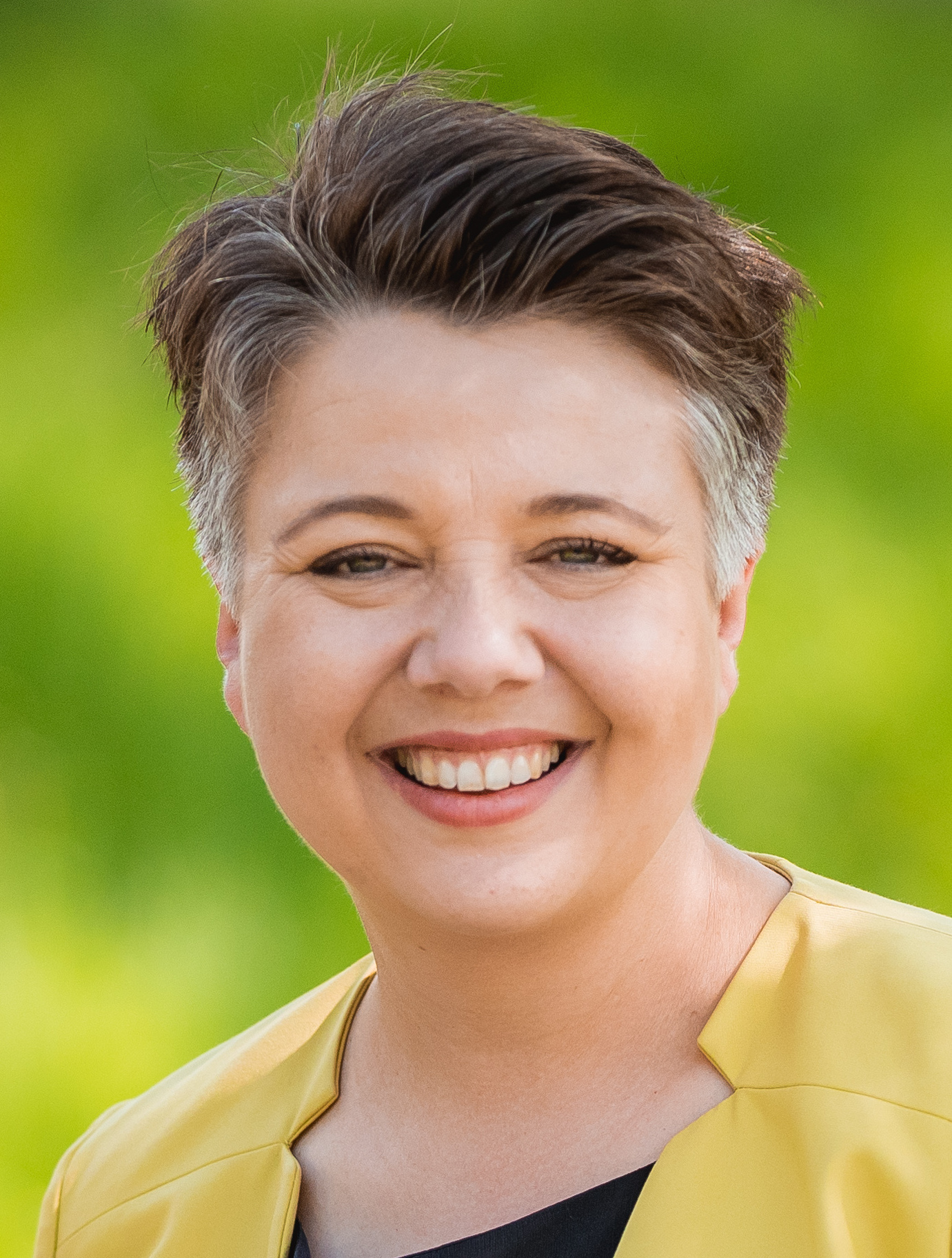
- Voglauer in 2022

Member of the National Council
- Incumbent
- Assumed office 23 October 2019
- Constituency: Carinthia

Personal details
- Born: 3 October 1980 (age 46)
- Party: The Greens

Olga Voglauer (born 3 October 1980 in Ludmannsdorf / Bilčovs) is an Austrian politician of The Greens. She has been a member of the National Council since 2019, and has served as general secretary of The Greens since 2023.
