= Irene Eisenhut =

Austrian politician (born 1974)

Member of the National Council
- Incumbent
- Assumed office 24 October 2024
- Constituency: Mostviertel

Personal details
- Born: 1974 (age 51–52)
- Party: Freedom Party

Irene Eisenhut (born 1974) is an Austrian police officer, trade unionist and politician of the Freedom Party serving as a member of the National Council since 2024. She has worked as a police officer since 1993 and has served as chairwoman of the Lower Austrian branch of the police union AUF since 2014.
