= Barbara Nessler =

Austrian politician (born 1991)

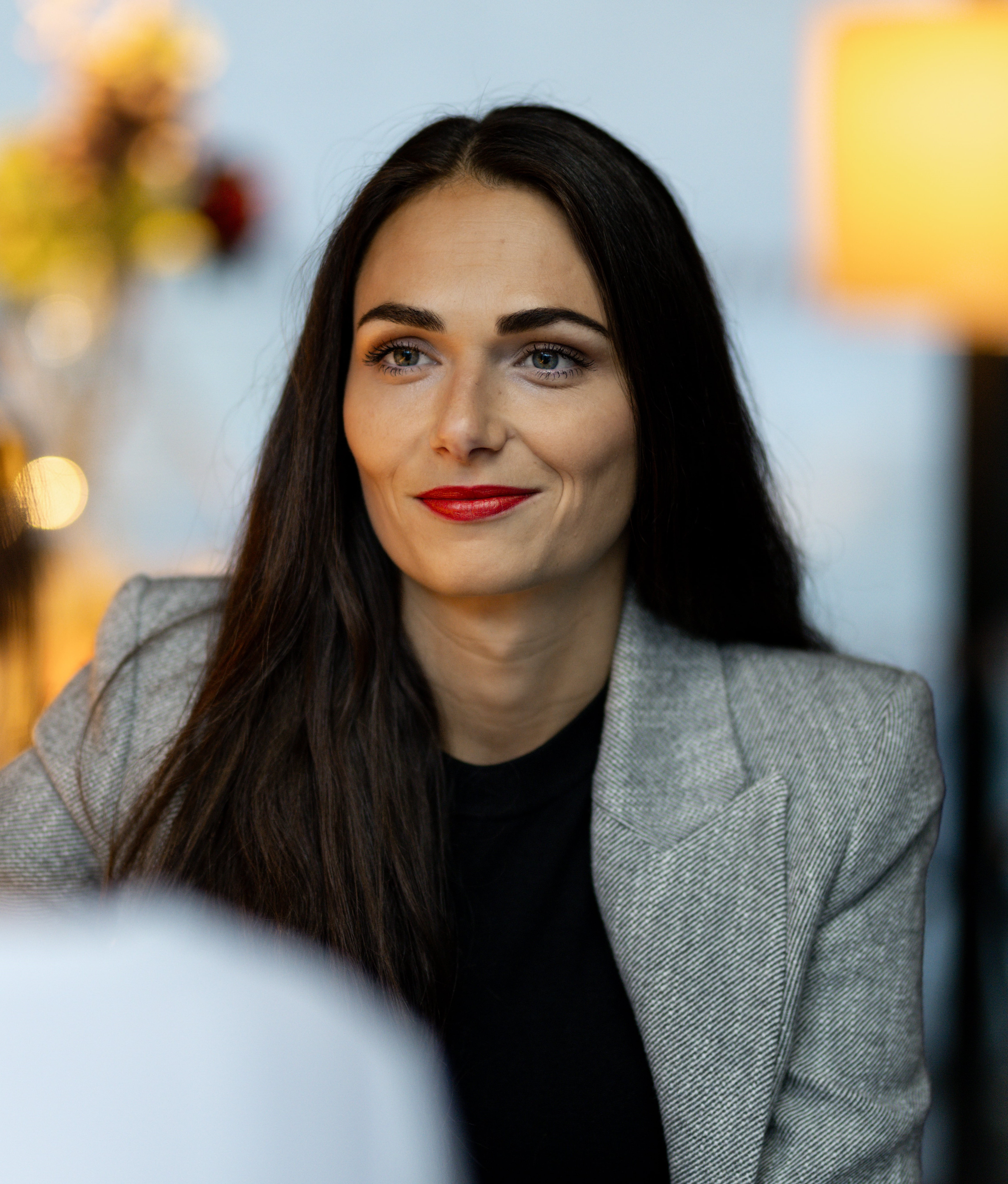
- Nessler in 2023

Member of the National Council
- Incumbent
- Assumed office 23 October 2019
- Constituency: Tyrol

Personal details
- Born: 2 March 1991 (age 35)
- Party: The Greens – The Green Alternative

Barbara Nessler (born 2 March 1991) is an Austrian politician of The Greens. Since 2019, she has been a member of the National Council. From 2018 to 2019, she was a member of the municipal council of Innsbruck.
