= Romana Deckenbacher =

Austrian politician (born 1967)

Member of the National Council
- Incumbent
- Assumed office 9 January 2020
- Preceded by: Gernot Blümel
- Constituency: Vienna

Personal details
- Born: 14 January 1967 (age 59)
- Party: People's Party

Romana Deckenbacher (born 14 January 1967) is an Austrian politician of the People's Party serving as a member of the National Council since 2020. From 2016 to 2022, she was a district councillor of Brigittenau.
