= Agnes Sirkka Prammer =

Austrian politician (born 1977)

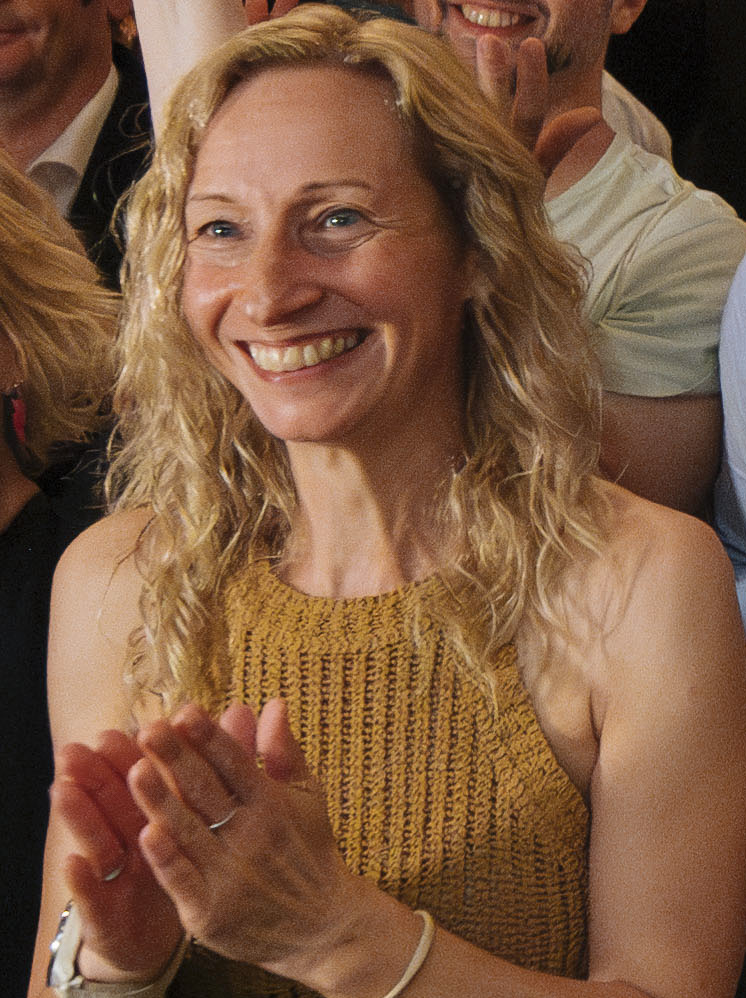
- Prammer in 2024

Member of the National Council
- Incumbent
- Assumed office 9 January 2020
- Preceded by: Leonore Gewessler
- Constituency: Greater Linz

Personal details
- Born: Agnes Sirkka Oswald; 17 November 1977 (age 49) Vienna, Austria
- Party: The Greens

Agnes Sirkka Prammer (née Oswald; born 17 November 1977) is an Austrian politician of The Greens. She has been a member of the National Council since 2020, and a municipal councillor of Leonding since 2015.

In addition to her role in parliament, Prammer has been serving as a member of the Austrian delegation to the Parliamentary Assembly of the Council of Europe (PACE) since 2023. In this capacity, she has been a member of the Assembly's Committee on Rules, Ethics and Immunities (since 2026); the Committee on the Election of Judges to the European Court of Human Rights (since 2026); Committee on Legal Affairs and Human Rights (since 2023); the Sub-Committee on Human Rights (since 2026). She also chairs PACE’s Parliamentary Alliance on Good Governance and Integrity in Sport.
