= Henrike Brandstötter =

Austrian politician (born 1975)

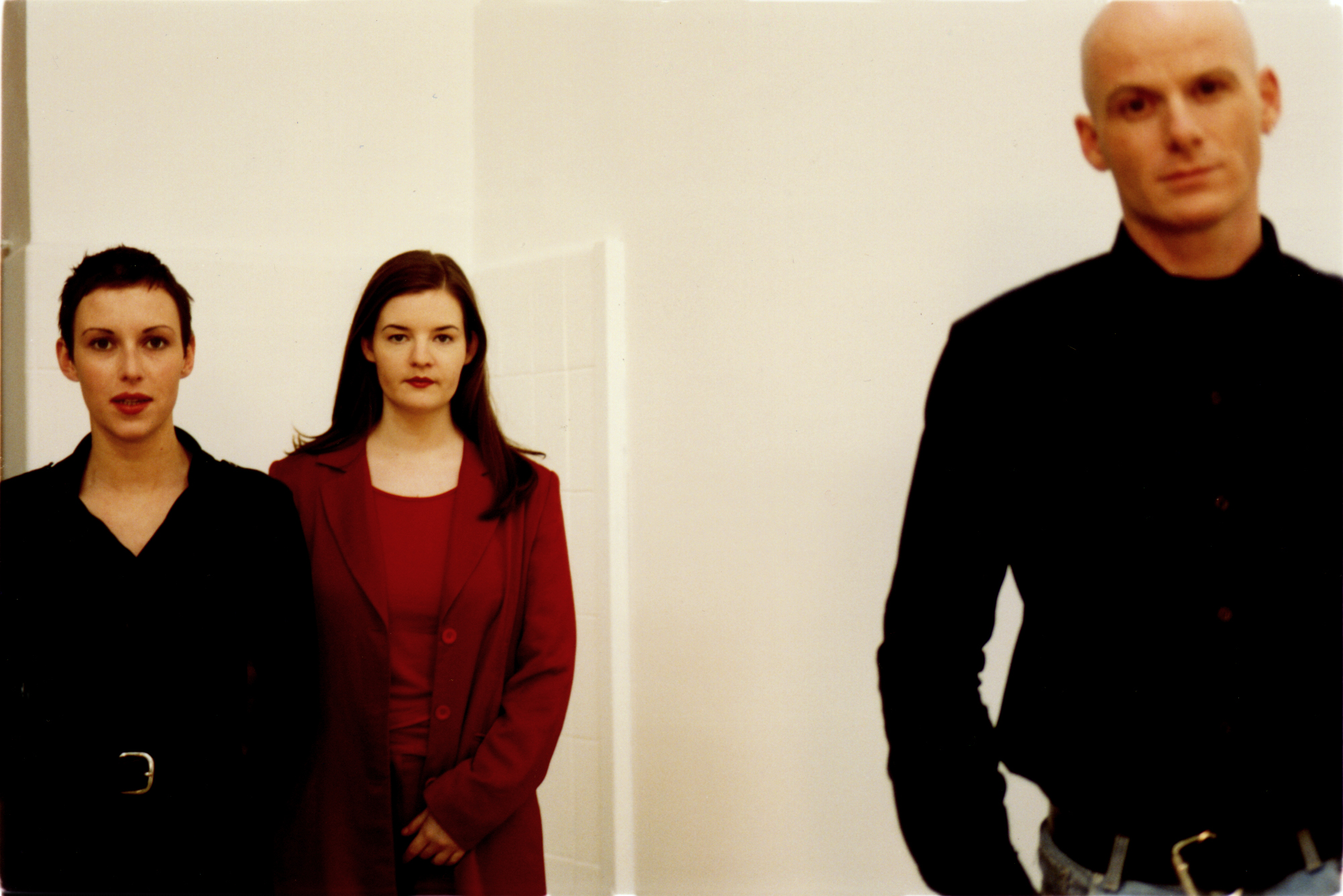
- Brandstötter in 1999

Member of the National Council
- Incumbent
- Assumed office 23 October 2019
- Constituency: Federal list

Personal details
- Born: 13 October 1975 (age 50) Salzburg, Austria
- Party: NEOS

Henrike Brandstötter (born 13 October 1975) is an Austrian politician of NEOS who has been serving as a member of the National Council since 2019. From 2015 to 2020, she had been a member of the Wieden district council.

Brandstötter is media spokesperson for Neos in the Stocker coalition, working on reforming the ORF via hackathon methods. In early 2026 the ORF rejected propaganda accusations she had launched. Brandstötter favored reducing the number of ORF foundation trustees (Stiftungsräte) to nine, and select them based on “expertise rather than party politics.”
