= Karin Doppelbauer =

Austrian politician (born 1975)

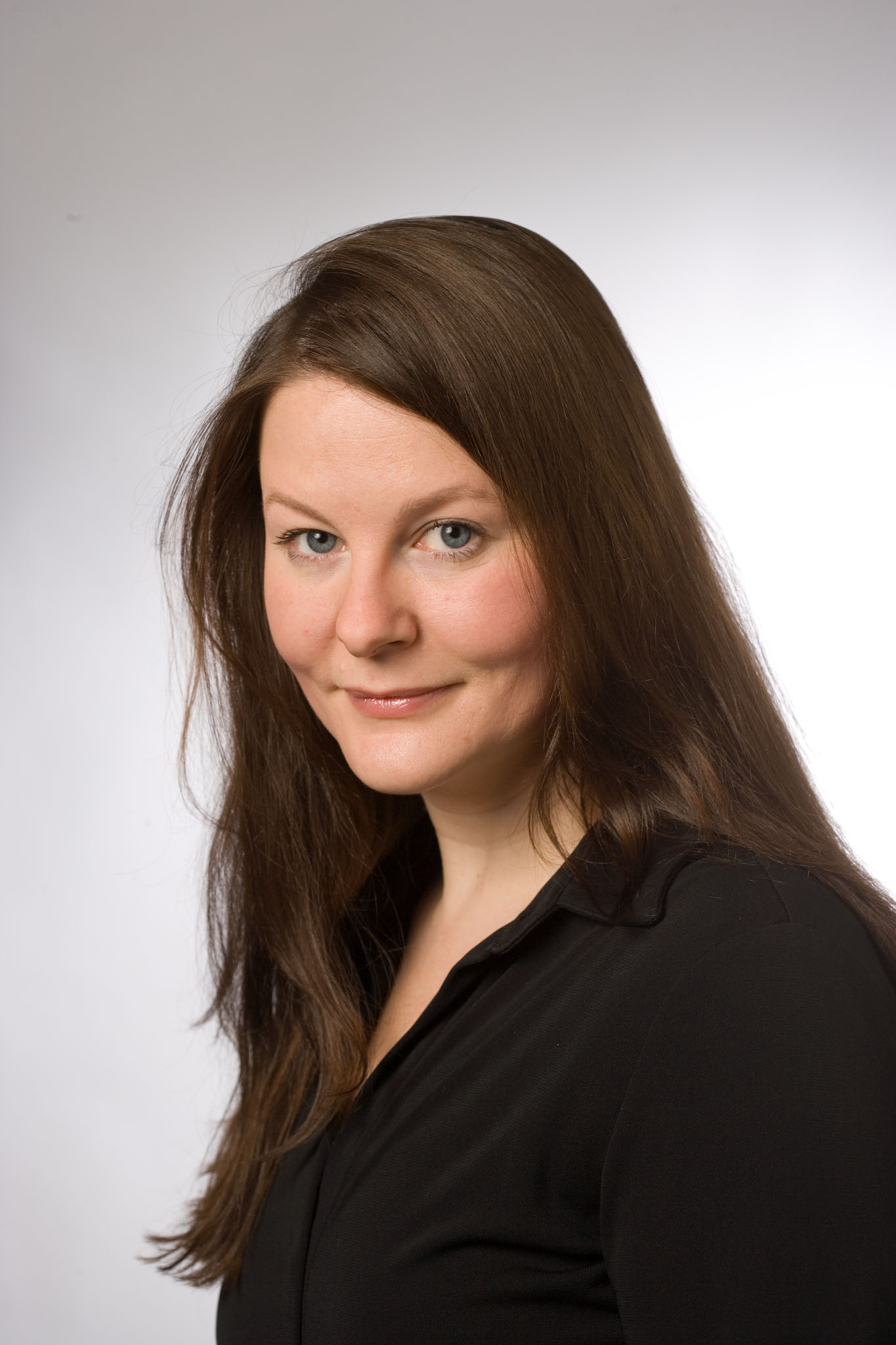
- Doppelbauer in 2007

Member of the National Council
- Incumbent
- Assumed office 4 April 2017
- Preceded by: Niko Alm
- Constituency: Vienna (2017); Upper Austria (2017–present)

Personal details
- Born: 2 March 1975 (age 51) Grieskirchen, Austria
- Party: NEOS

Karin Doppelbauer (born 2 March 1975) is an Austrian politician of NEOS. She has been a member of the National Council since 2017, and has served as spokesperson of JUNOS in Upper Austria since 2024.
