= Thomas Drozda =

Austrian politician (born 1965)

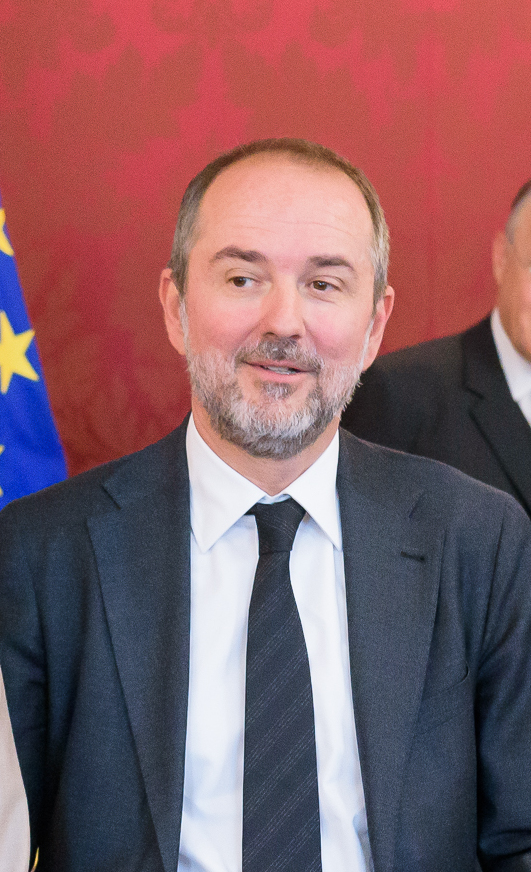

Managing director of the Social Democratic Party
- Incumbent
- Assumed office 25 September 2018
- Chairperson: Pamela Rendi-Wagner
- Preceded by: Max Lercher

Member of the National Council
- Incumbent
- Assumed office 9 November 2017
- Nominated by: Christian Kern
- Affiliation: Social Democratic Party

Personal details
- Born: 24 July 1965 (age 59); Piberbach, Upper Austria, Austria
- Political party: Social Democratic Party

Thomas Drozda (born 24 July 1965) is an Austrian politician and a member of the National Council. From 2016 to 2017 he was chancellery minister under the Kern government. Since September 2018 he has been serving as managing director of the Social Democratic Party.
