= David Stögmüller =

Austrian politician (born 1987)

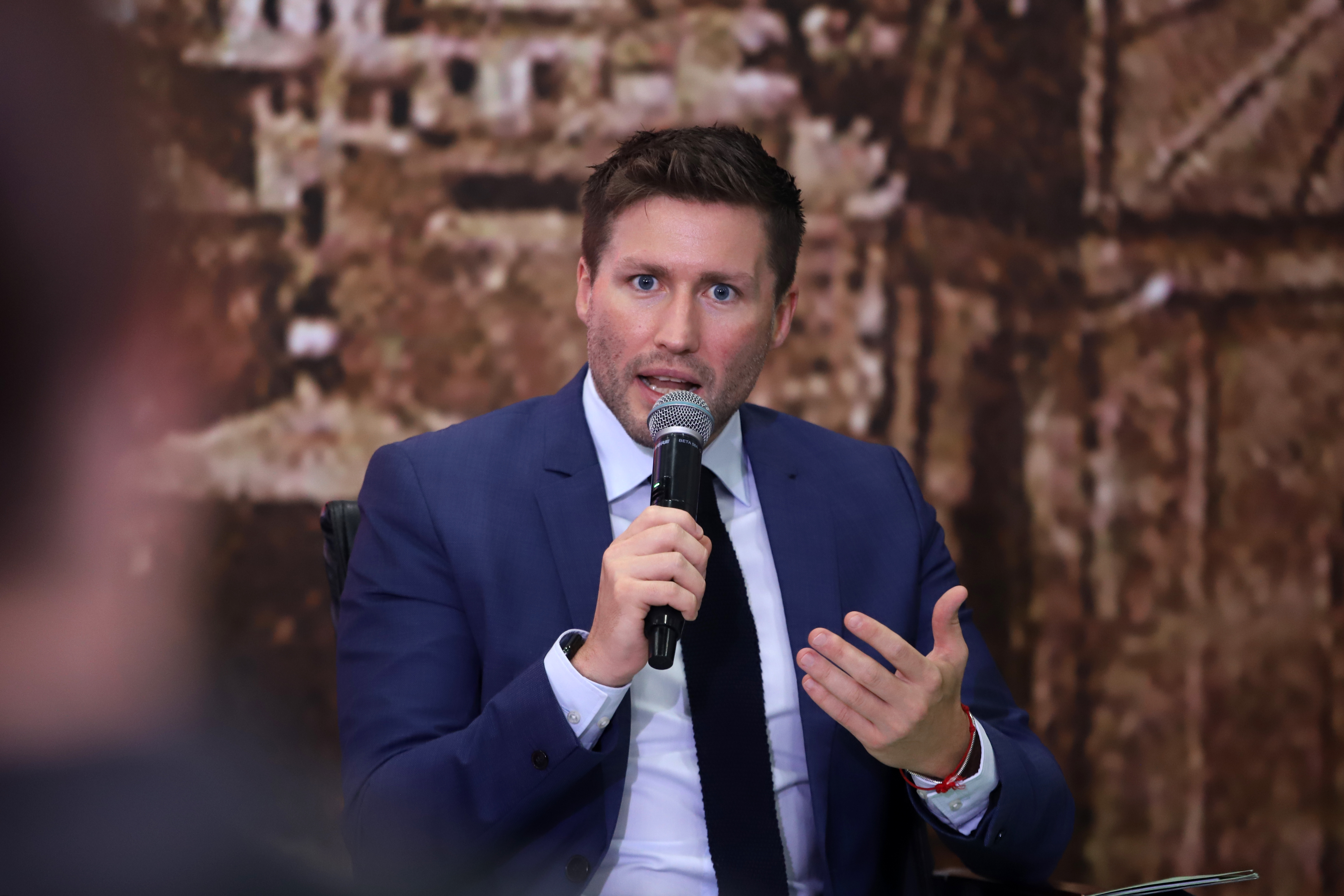
- Stögmüller in 2023

Member of the National Council
- Incumbent
- Assumed office 23 October 2019
- Constituency: Upper Austria

Member of the Federal Council
- In office 23 October 2015 – 22 October 2019
- Succeeded by: Claudia Hauschildt-Buschberger

Personal details
- Born: 1 February 1987 (age 39)
- Party: The Greens – The Green Alternative

David Stögmüller (born 1 February 1987) is an Austrian politician of The Greens. Since 2019, he has been a member of the National Council. From 2015 to 2019, he was a member of the Federal Council.
