= Veit Dengler =

Austrian politician (born 1968)

Member of the National Council
- Incumbent
- Assumed office 24 October 2024
- Constituency: Styria

Personal details
- Born: 21 November 1968 (age 57)
- Party: NEOS

Veit Valentin Dengler (born 21 November 1968) is an Austrian politician and co-founder of NEOS who has been serving as a member of the National Council since 2024.

From 2013 to 2017, Dengler headed NZZ Mediengruppe. From 2018 to 2021 he was COO of Bauer Media Group.

Expelled from his offices and the party itself for revolting against NEOS' political free riding and their authoritarian leadership style Dengler has been serving as independent politician since 10 July 2026.

A major topic on Dengler's political agenda are serious reductions in Austria's lavish system of political subsidies. Independents may secure speaking time on their own rather than being stonewalled by the usual party restrictions on public speech at political institutions. Dengler has repeatedly stated that he wants neutral Austria to join NATO.

== See also ==
- Cartel party theory
- Declaration of Neutrality
- Public participation
