= Petra Oberrauner =

Austrian politician (born 1965)

Member of the National Council
- Incumbent
- Assumed office 23 October 2019
- Constituency: Carinthia

Personal details
- Born: 27 January 1965 (age 61)
- Party: Social Democratic Party

Petra Oberrauner (born 27 January 1965) is an Austrian politician of the Social Democratic Party serving as a member of the National Council since 2019. Since 2022, she has served as deputy leader of the Social Democratic Party in Carinthia, and as leader of the party's women's wing in the state.
