= Elisabeth Götze =

Member of the National Council of Austria

Elisabeth Götze (born March 19, 1966) is an Austrian politician of The Greens – The Green Alternative. From 2015 to 2020, she was deputy mayor of Eichgraben, and since October 23, 2019, she is a member of the National Council.

== Life ==
=== Education and career ===
Elisabeth Götze attended the Mondweg Elementary School in Vienna and the Dominican Sisters' Secondary School for Modern Languages, where she graduated in 1984. She then began studying business economics at the Vienna University of Economics and Business Administration (WU), graduating in 1991 with a Magistra. From 1998, she pursued doctoral studies at WU, where she received her doctorate in 2002 with a dissertation titled Brand knowledge of 3- to 5-year-old children and its influence on brand decisions of their caregivers: empirical findings from selected countries.

From 1991 to 1992 and from 1998 to 2006, Götze was a university assistant at WU at the Institute for International Marketing and Management. In between, she worked as an assistant in a direct sales company. From 1998 to 2015 she was a lecturer at the University of Applied Sciences Wiener Neustadt, from 2006 to 2010 at the University of Applied Sciences Burgenland, and from 2014 to 2017 at the University of Continuing Education Krems. Since 2007, she has been a Senior Lecturer at the Vienna University of Economics and Business Administration. She has held teaching positions at the Hanoi University of Technology and the National Economics University, the Graduate School of Management in St. Petersburg, Russia, and the University of Gadjah Mada / Yogyakarta in Indonesia, among others.

=== Politics ===
Götze was a member of the municipal council of the market town of Eichgraben from 2005 to 2010, where she became deputy mayor after the 2015 municipal elections. In May 2018, she was elected to the provincial executive of the Green Party of Lower Austria. Since 2019, she has been a member of the regional leadership of the Lower Austria regional group of the Green Economy. In 2020, Johannes Maschl succeeded her as deputy mayor of Eichgraben; Götze remained an education and European councillor in Eichgraben.

In the 2019 Austrian legislative election, Götze was the Greens' top candidate in the Lower Austria constituency. On October 23, 2019, she was sworn in as a member of the Austrian National Council at the beginning of the 27th legislative period. As part of the negotiations to form a coalition government in 2019, she negotiated in the main group Economy and Finance. In the Green parliamentary group, she became spokesperson for economy and innovation, municipalities, and cities. For the 2024 Austrian legislative election, she was again chosen as the top candidate for Lower Austria in June 2023.
