= Selma Yildirim =

Austrian politician (born 1969)

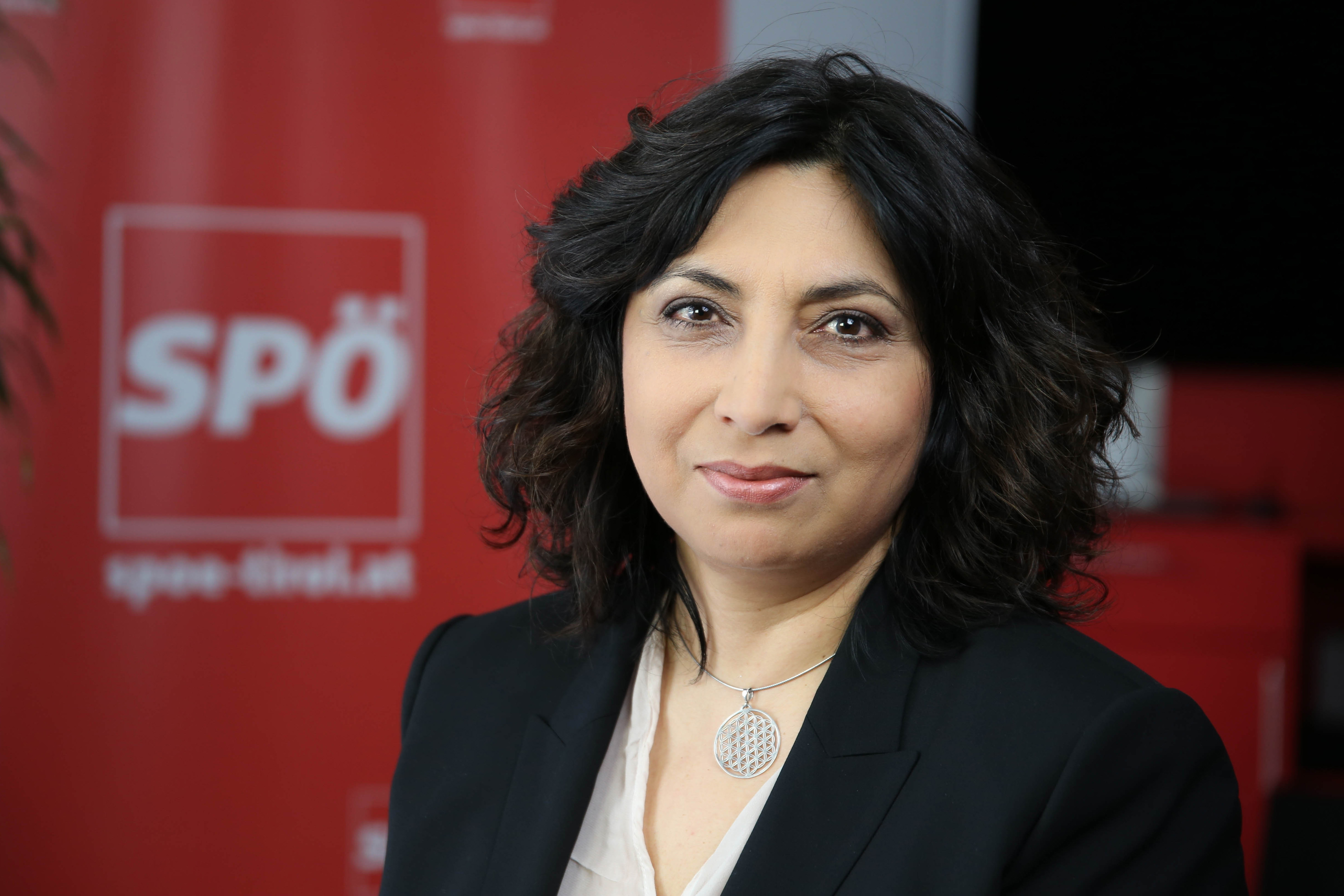

Member of National Council
- Incumbent
- Assumed office 15 October 2017
- President: Wolfgang Sobotka

Personal details
- Born: 25 August 1969 (age 55); Istanbul, Turkey
- Political party: Social Democratic Party

Selma Yildirim (born 25 August 1969) is an Austrian politician who is a member of the National Council and deputy chairperson of the Social Democratic Party of Austria (SPÖ).

== Life ==
Yildirim was born in 1969 in Istanbul, Turkey, and moved to Austria as a child. She studied law at the University of Innsbruck. She is the leader of the SPÖ Tirol's women's organisation since 2014. In November 2019 Yildirim became the party's spokesperson on judicial affairs.

Yildirim was elected to the National Council in the 2017 election, after running as her party's leading candidate in Tyrol. She kept her seat after the 2019 election.

Earlier, in April 2017, Yildirim had been nominated to become a judge on the Bundesfinanzgericht, but she was rejected in 2018 because she became a member of parliament in the meantime.
