= Rosa Ecker =

Austrian politician (born 1969)

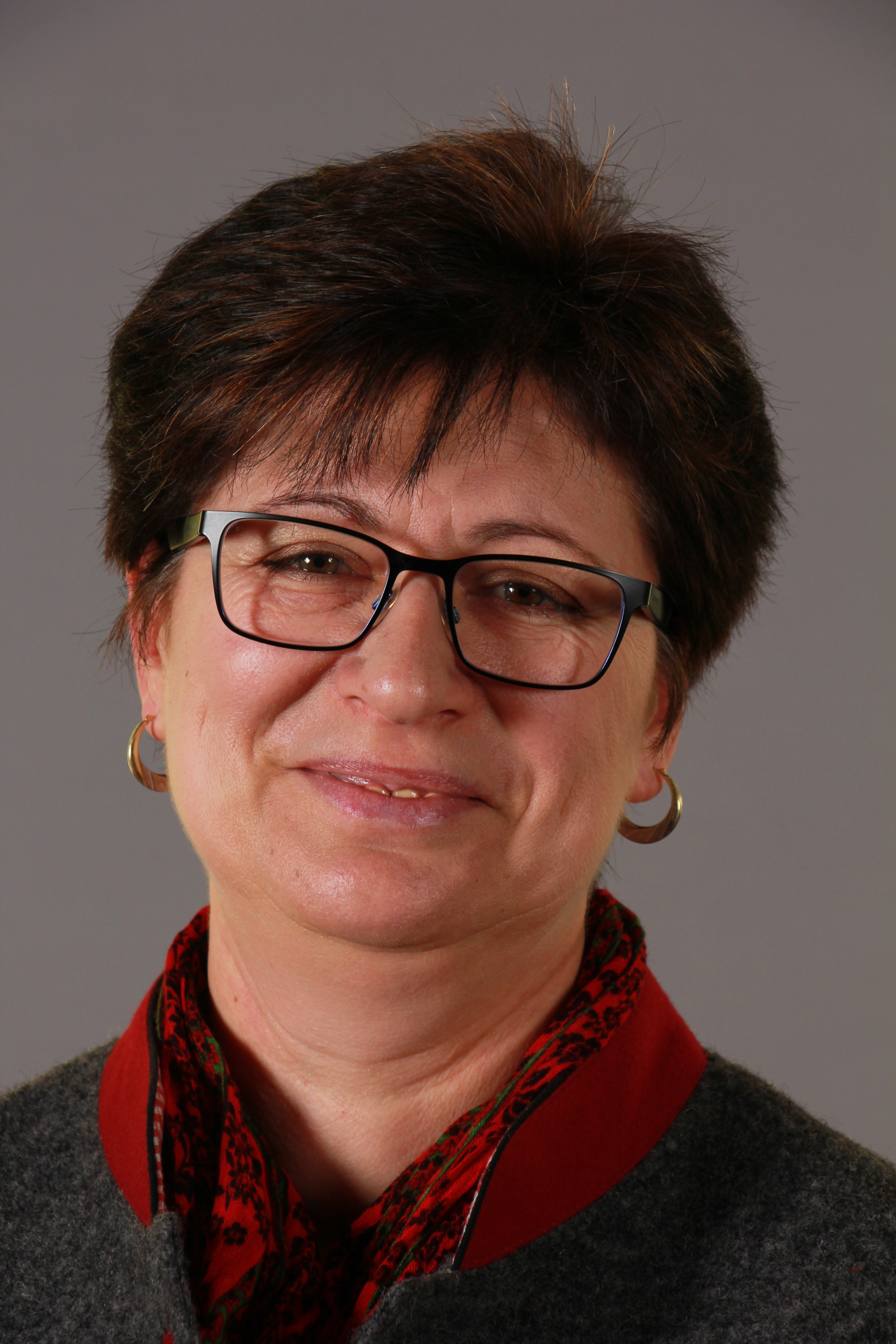

Member of the Federal Council
- Incumbent
- Assumed office 23 October 2015

Personal details
- Born: 10 March 1969 (age 57)
- Party: Freedom Party of Austria

Rosa Ecker (born 10 April 1969) is an Austrian politician who has been a Member of the Federal Council for the Freedom Party of Austria (FPÖ) since 2015.
