= Markus Koza =

Austrian politician (born 1970)

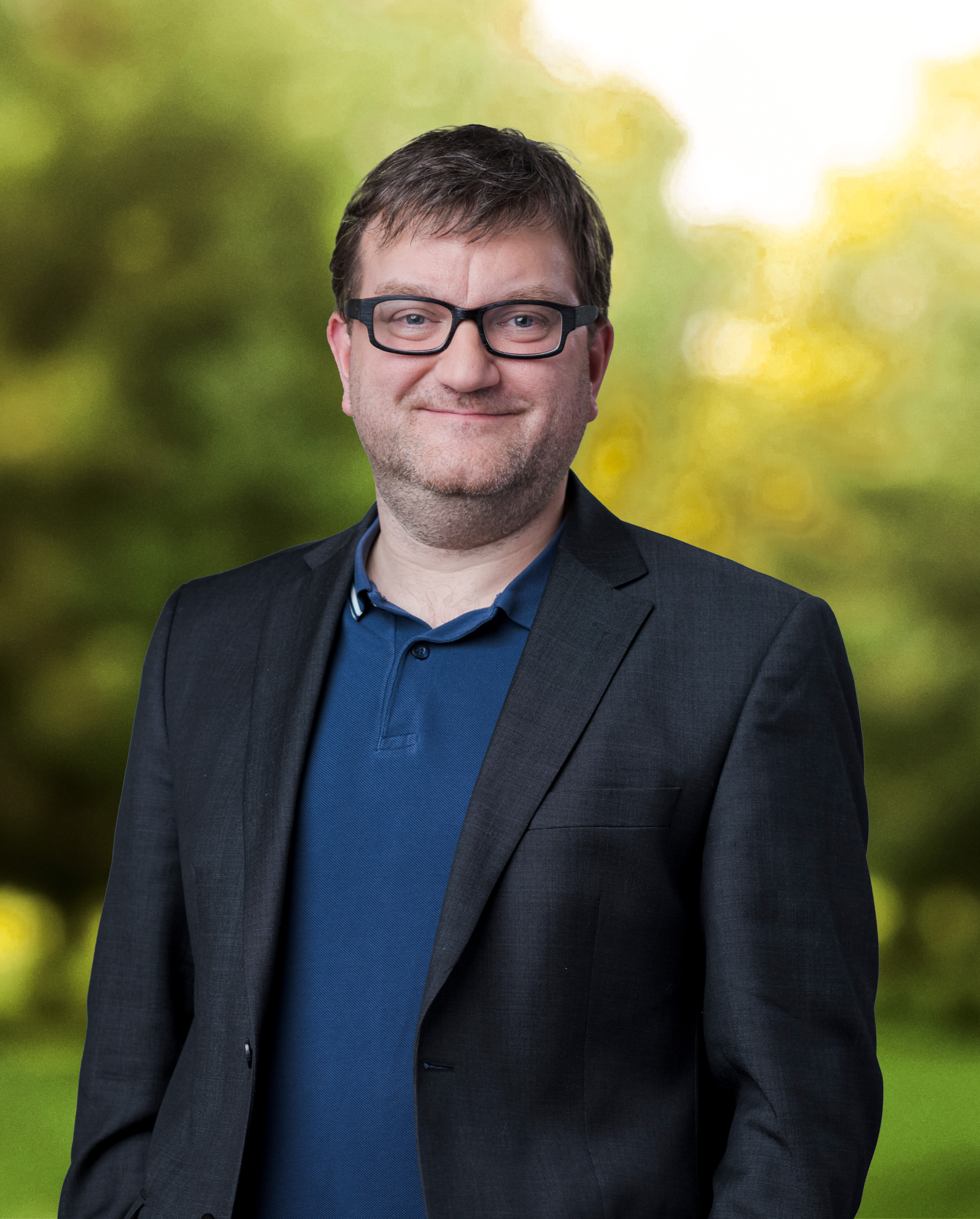
- Koza in 2024

Member of the National Council
- Incumbent
- Assumed office 23 October 2019
- Constituency: Federal list (2019–2024); Vienna (2024–present)

Personal details
- Born: 12 December 1970 (age 55)
- Party: The Greens

Markus Koza (born 12 December 1970) is an Austrian politician of The Greens serving as a member of the National Council since 2019. Until 2019, he was a district councillor of Wieden.

Koza is working towards a fair contribution by the wealthy to funding the welfare state and balancing the budget.
