= Melanie Erasim =

Austrian politician (born 1983)

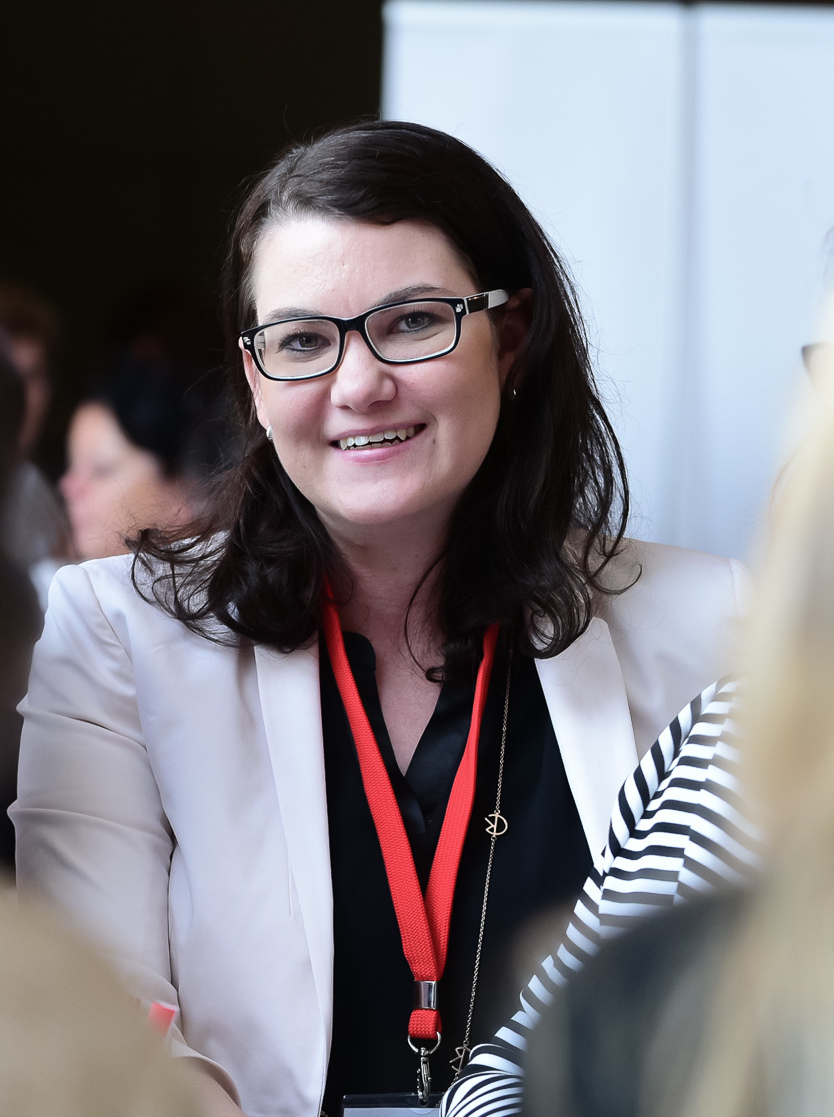
- Erasim in 2018

Member of the National Council
- Incumbent
- Assumed office 15 April 2021
- Preceded by: Sonja Hammerschmid
- Constituency: Lower Austria
- In office 9 November 2017 – 22 October 2019
- Constituency: Weinviertel

Personal details
- Born: 23 January 1983 (age 43)
- Party: Social Democratic Party

Melanie Erasim (born 23 January 1983) is an Austrian politician of the Social Democratic Party. She has been a member of the National Council since 2021, having previously served from 2017 to 2019. Since 2015, she has served as leader of the Social Democratic Party in Mistelbach.
