= Sigrid Maurer =

Austrian politician (born 1985)

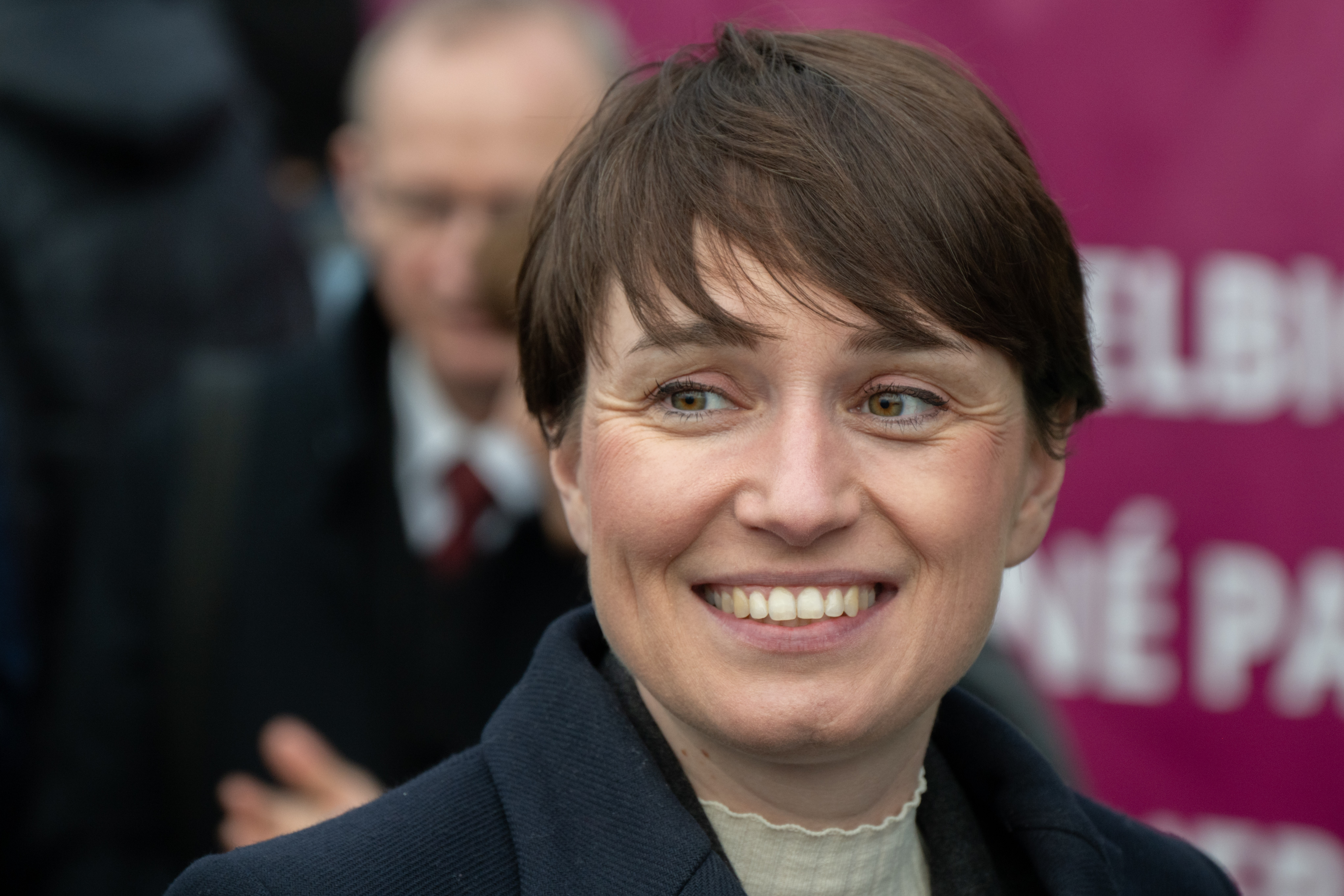
- Born: 19 March 1985; Rum
- Other names: Sigi Maurer
- Education: University of Innsbruck (no degree)
- Alma mater: University of Vienna
- Occupation: Politician
- Political party: The Greens
- Website: www.sigimaurer.at
- Position held: member of the National Council of Austria (2013–2017), Austrian Students' Association chairperson (2009–2011), member of the National Council of Austria (2019–)

Sigrid Maurer (Sigrid V. "Sigi" Maurer, born 19 March 1985 Rum, Tyrol) is an Austrian politician, and former student representative, (GRAS). Since 7 January 2020 she serves as the club chairwoman of the Austrian Greens and is a member of the Austrian national council since 2019 and before between 2013 and 2017.

== Life ==
Maurer studied music and political science without graduating at the University of Innsbruck from 2004 to 2009. Subsequently, she studied sociology at the University of Vienna and graduated in 2017 (Bachelor of Arts).

Since 2005, Maurer has been involved in the Austrian Students Union and became a member of the Green & Alternative Students (GRAS). From October 2013 to November 2017, she was a member of the National Council. In the 2019 Austrian legislative election, she ran for the Vienna Greens on the third list in the state constituency of Vienna.
