= Nina Tomaselli =

Austrian politician (born 1985)

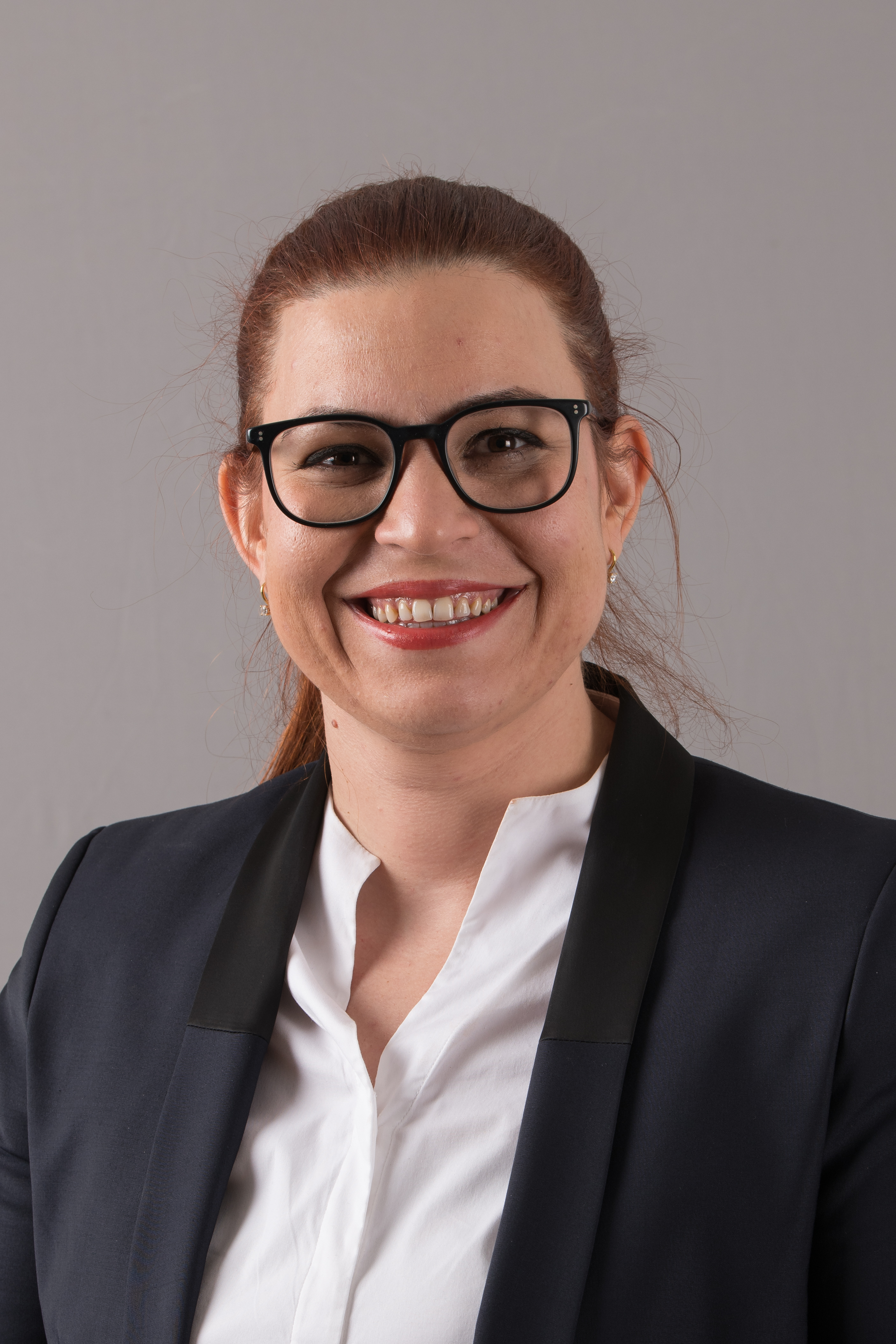
- Tomaselli in 2017

Member of the National Council
- Incumbent
- Assumed office 23 October 2019
- Constituency: Vorarlberg

Personal details
- Born: 16 April 1985 (age 41)
- Party: The Greens – The Green Alternative

Nina Tomaselli (born 16 April 1985) is an Austrian politician of The Greens. Since 2019, she has been a member of the National Council. She was a member of the Landtag of Vorarlberg from 2014 to 2019, and a deputy spokesperson of The Greens from 2019 to 2022.
