= Martina Künsberg Sarre =

Austrian politician (born 1976)

Member of the National Council
- Incumbent
- Assumed office 23 October 2019
- Constituency: Lower Austria

Personal details
- Born: 17 January 1976 (age 50)
- Party: NEOS

Martina Künsberg Sarre (born 17 January 1976) is an Austrian politician of NEOS. She has been a member of the National Council since 2019, and was a co-founder of NEOS in 2012.
