= Petra Tanzler =

Austrian politician (born 1973)

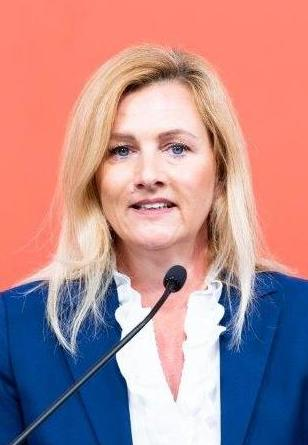
- Tanzler in 2022

Member of the National Council
- Incumbent
- Assumed office 23 October 2019
- Constituency: Lower Austria

Personal details
- Born: 21 January 1973 (age 53)
- Party: Social Democratic Party

Petra Tanzler, formerly Vorderwinkler (born 21 January 1973), is an Austrian politician of the Social Democratic Party serving as a member of the National Council since 2019. From 2015 to 2020, she was a municipal councillor of Hochwolkersdorf.
