= Hannes Amesbauer =

Austrian politician (born 1981)

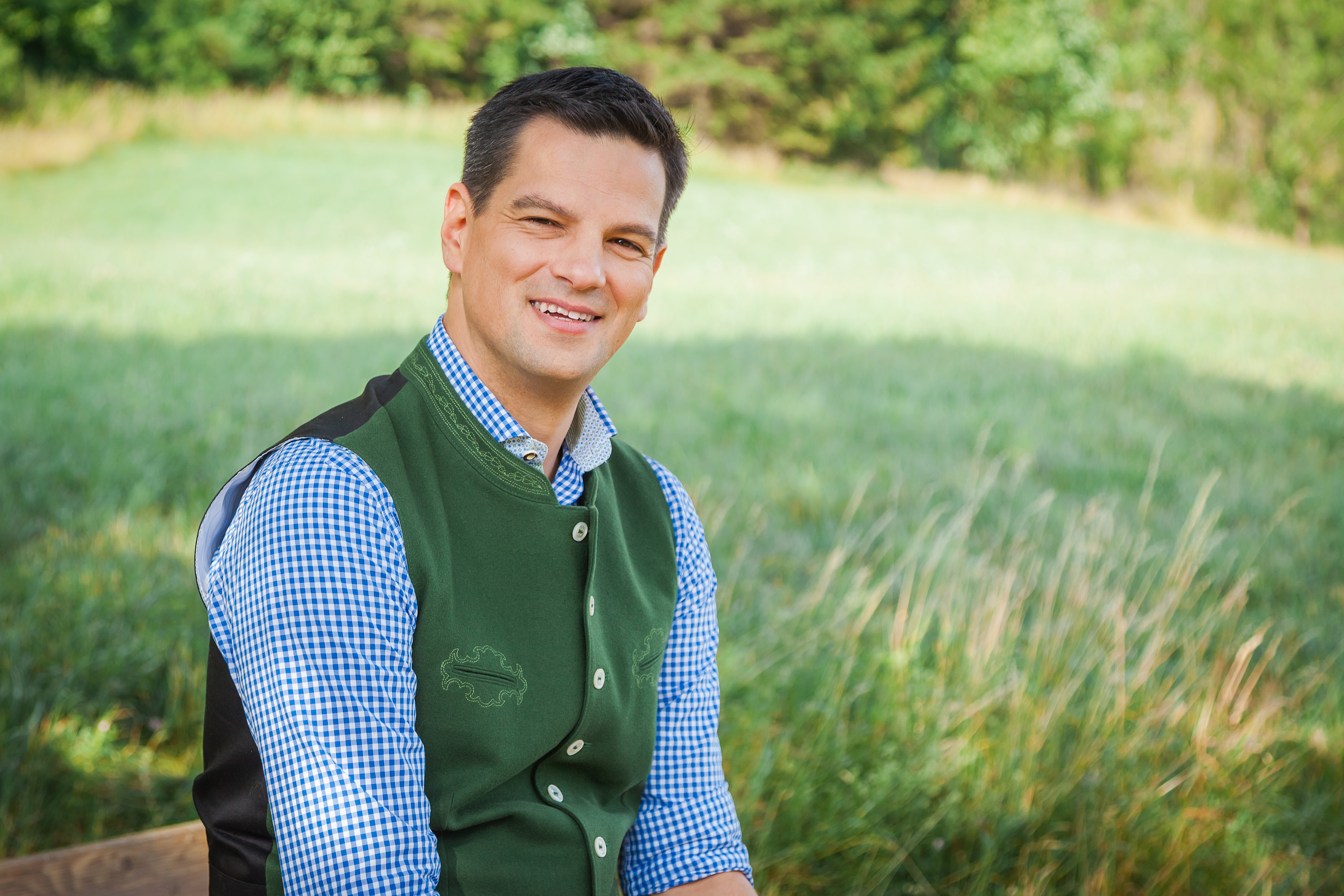
- Amesbauer in 2020

Member of the National Council
- Incumbent
- Assumed office 9 November 2017
- Constituency: Upper Styria (2017–2024); Federal list (2024–present)

Personal details
- Born: 18 April 1981 (age 44)
- Party: Freedom Party

Hannes Amesbauer (born 18 April 1981) is an Austrian politician of the Freedom Party. He has been a member of the National Council since 2017, and was a member of the Landtag of Styria from 2010 to 2017.

Amesbauer has been accused of having ties to the far right and to neo-nazis. In August 2023, Amesbauer referred to the Documentation Centre of Austrian Resistance as a "pseudo-scientific ideological institution"; in January 2025, the Handelsgericht Wien, the court of first instance, ruled this to be tolerable.
