= List of members of the 26th National Council of Austria =

26th National Council
←	25th	27th	→
- Composition of the 26th National Council. Top: Composition at constitution. Bottom: Composition at dissolution.

Overview
- Legislative body: National Council
- Jurisdiction: Austria
- Meeting place: Hofburg Imperial Palace, Vienna
- Term: 9 November 2017 – 22 October 2019
- Election: 15 October 2017
- Government: First Kurz government Bierlein government
- Members: 183
- President: Wolfgang Sobotka (ÖVP)
- Second President: Doris Bures (SPÖ)
- Third President: Anneliese Kitzmüller (FPÖ)

This is a list of members of the 26th National Council (German: Nationalrat) of Austria, the lower house of the bicameral legislature. The 26th National Council was elected in the 15 October 2017 legislative election, and was constituted in its first session on 9 November 2017. Its term ended on 22 October 2019.

Originally, the National Council comprised 62 members of the Austrian People's Party (ÖVP), 52 members of the Social Democratic Party of Austria (SPÖ), 51 members of the Freedom Party of Austria (FPÖ), 10 members of NEOS – The New Austria and Liberal Forum (NEOS), and 8 members of the Peter Pilz List (named JETZT from November 2018). By the dissolution of the National Council, there were four non-attached members: Martha Bißmann (former PILZ, expelled), Efgani Dönmez (former ÖVP, expelled), David Lasar (former FPÖ, resigned), and Alma Zadić (former JETZT, expelled).

The President of the National Council was initially Elisabeth Köstinger (ÖVP). She resigned on 17 December 2017 in anticipation of being appointed to Cabinet Kurz I; Third President Norbert Hofer (FPÖ) resigned for the same reason on 18 December. On 20 December, Wolfgang Sobotka was elected to replace Köstinger, and Anneliese Kitzmüller to replace Hofer. They served until the National Council's dissolution. The Second President was Doris Bures (SPÖ), who served for the entirety of the legislative term.

== Presidium ==
President		Party	Term
President	Elisabeth Köstinger	ÖVP	9 Nov. 2017 – 17 Dec. 2017
President	Wolfgang Sobotka	ÖVP	20 Dec. 2017 – dissolution
Second President	Doris Bures	SPÖ	9 Nov. 2017 – dissolution
Third President	Norbert Hofer	FPÖ	9 Nov. 2017 – 18 Dec. 2017
Third President	Anneliese Kitzmüller	FPÖ	20 Dec. 2017 – dissolution
Source: National Council

== Parliamentary groups ==
Group	Members		Leader	
Group	At election	At dissolution	Leader	
Austrian People's Party (ÖVP)	62 / 183	61 / 183	Sebastian Kurz	9 Nov. 2017 – 20 Dec. 2017
Austrian People's Party (ÖVP)	62 / 183	61 / 183	August Wöginger	20 Dec. 2017 – dissolution
Social Democratic Party of Austria (SPÖ)	52 / 183	52 / 183	Christian Kern	9 Nov. 2017 – 8 Oct. 2018
Social Democratic Party of Austria (SPÖ)	52 / 183	52 / 183	Pamela Rendi-Wagner	8 Oct. 2018 – dissolution
Freedom Party of Austria (FPÖ)	51 / 183	50 / 183	Heinz-Christian Strache	9 Nov. 2017 – 20 Dec. 2017
Freedom Party of Austria (FPÖ)	51 / 183	50 / 183	Walter Rosenkranz	20 Dec. 2017 – 27 May 2019
Freedom Party of Austria (FPÖ)	51 / 183	50 / 183	Norbert Hofer	27 May 2019 – dissolution
NEOS – The New Austria and Liberal Forum (NEOS)	10 / 183	10 / 183	Matthias Strolz	9 Nov. 2017 – 26 Sep. 2018
NEOS – The New Austria and Liberal Forum (NEOS)	10 / 183	10 / 183	Beate Meinl-Reisinger	18 Oct. 2018 – dissolution
Peter Pilz List (PILZ) (to 20 Nov. 2018); JETZT – Pilz List (JETZT) (from 20 Nov. 2018)	8 / 183	6 / 183	Peter Kolba	9 Nov. 2017 – 1 Jun. 2018
Peter Pilz List (PILZ) (to 20 Nov. 2018); JETZT – Pilz List (JETZT) (from 20 Nov. 2018)	8 / 183	6 / 183	Bruno Rossmann	1 Jun. 2018 – dissolution
No group affiliation	0 / 183	4 / 183	–	–
Source: National Council

== List of members at dissolution ==
Image	Name	Date of birth	Party	Constituency	State	Notes	Ref.
	Hannes Amesbauer	18 April 1981	FPÖ	6D – Upper Styria	Styria		
	Maurice Androsch	25 April 1970	SPÖ	3 – Lower Austria	Lower Austria		
	Erwin Angerer	30 December 1964	FPÖ	2C – Carinthia West	Carinthia		
	Konrad Antoni	4 May 1964	SPÖ	3B – Waldviertel	Lower Austria		
	Walter Bacher	2 September 1962	SPÖ	5 – Salzburg	Salzburg		
	Angela Baumgartner	20 May 1969	ÖVP	3G – Lower Austria East	Lower Austria		
	Petra Bayr	28 April 1968	SPÖ	9D – Vienna South	Vienna		
	Ruth Becher	28 January 1956	SPÖ	9G – Vienna North	Vienna		
	Dagmar Belakowitsch	24 August 1968	FPÖ	Federal list	Federal list		
	Ricarda Bianca Berger	22 May 1986	FPÖ	9D – Vienna South	Vienna	Moved up on 20 December 2017 after the resignation of Hubert Fuchs; Moved up to constituency 9D on 24 May 2019 after the resignation of Johann Gudenus	
	Nikolaus Berlakovich	4 June 1961	ÖVP	1B – Burgenland South	Burgenland		
	Michael Bernhard	30 April 1981	NEOS	Federal list	Federal list		
	Martha Bißmann	23 March 1980	Independent	6 – Styria	Styria	Elected for the Peter Pilz List, expelled on 19 July 2018	
	Juliane Bogner-Strauß	3 November 1971	ÖVP	6 – Styria	Styria	Resigned on 22 January 2018, replaced by Josef Smolle; Moved up on 5 June 2019 after the resignation of Josef Smolle	
	Reinhard Eugen Bösch	16 January 1957	FPÖ	8A – Vorarlberg North	Vorarlberg		
	Lukas Brandweiner	28 May 1989	ÖVP	3B – Waldviertel	Lower Austria	Moved up on 12 June 2019 after the resignation of Angela Fichtinger	
	Hermann Brückl	3 November 1968	FPÖ	4B – Innviertel	Upper Austria		
	Doris Bures	3 August 1962	SPÖ	9E – Vienna South-West	Vienna	Second President of the National Council	
	Stephanie Cox	31 January 1989	JETZT	9 – Vienna	Vienna		
	Gerhard Deimek	9 January 1963	FPÖ	4D – Traunviertel	Upper Austria		
	Martina Diesner-Wais	10 February 1968	ÖVP	3B – Waldviertel	Lower Austria		
	Thomas Dim	30 December 1964	FPÖ	4 – Upper Austria	Upper Austria	Moved up on 24 May 2019 after the resignation of Wolfgang Klinger	
	Efgani Dönmez	30 October 1976	Independent	Federal list	Federal list	Elected for the ÖVP, expelled on 3 September 2018.	
	Karin Doppelbauer	2 March 1975	NEOS	4 – Upper Austria	Upper Austria		
	Thomas Drozda	24 July 1965	SPÖ	Federal list	Federal list		
	Muna Duzdar	22 August 1978	SPÖ	9 – Vienna	Vienna		
	Cornelia Ecker	27 February 1976	SPÖ	5 – Salzburg	Salzburg		
	Reinhold Einwallner	13 May 1973	SPÖ	8 – Vorarlberg	Vorarlberg		
	Martin Engelberg	13 March 1960	ÖVP	Federal list	Federal list		
	Melanie Erasim	23 January 1983	SPÖ	3A – Weinviertel	Lower Austria		
	Franz Leonhard Eßl	19 July 1957	ÖVP	5C – Lungau-Pinzgau-Pongau	Salzburg		
	Elisabeth Feichtinger	24 September 1987	SPÖ	Federal list	Federal list		
	Klaus Uwe Feichtinger	18 November 1970	SPÖ	6B – East Styria	Styria		
	Klaudia Friedl	21 March 1963	SPÖ	1B – Burgenland South	Burgenland		
	Hubert Fuchs	13 January 1969	FPÖ	9D – Vienna South	Vienna	Resigned on 22 January 2018, replaced by Ricarda Bianca Berger; Moved up on 5 June 2019 after the resignation of Johann Gudenus	
	Klaus Fürlinger	1 June 1965	ÖVP	4A – Greater Linz	Upper Austria		
	Susanne Fürst	3 May 1969	FPÖ	Federal list	Federal list		
	Hermann Gahr	15 July 1960	ÖVP	7B – Innsbruck Rural	Tyrol		
	Wolfgang Gerstl	14 October 1961	ÖVP	9E – Vienna South-West	Vienna		
	Peter Gerstner	8 April 1959	FPÖ	3 – Lower Austria	Lower Austria		
	Ernst Gödl	28 December 1971	ÖVP	6A – Greater Graz	Styria		
	Martin Graf	11 May 1960	FPÖ	9 – Vienna	Vienna		
	Tanja Graf	7 May 1975	ÖVP	5 – Salzburg	Salzburg		
	Karin Greiner	4 November 1967	SPÖ	6A – Greater Graz	Styria		
	Irmgard Griss	13 October 1946	NEOS	6 – Styria	Styria		
	Maria Großbauer	25 May 1980	ÖVP	Federal list	Federal list		
	Renate Gruber	4 November 1967	SPÖ	3C – Mostviertel	Lower Austria	Moved up on 22 March 2018 after the resignation of Ulrike Königsberger-Ludwig	
	Kira Grünberg	13 August 1993	ÖVP	Federal list	Federal list	Elected for constituency 7 – Tyrol; Moved up to the federal list on 24 January 2018 after the resignation of Josef Moser	
	Christian Hafenecker	11 August 1980	FPÖ	3D – Lower Austria Centre	Lower Austria		
	Doris Hager-Hämmerle	6 January 1970	NEOS	Federal list	Federal list		
	Michael Hammer	3 June 1977	ÖVP	4E – Mühlviertel	Upper Austria		
	Sonja Hammerschmid	24 June 1968	SPÖ	3 – Lower Austria	Lower Austria		
	Andreas Hanger	19 June 1968	ÖVP	3C – Mostviertel	Lower Austria		
	Peter Haubner	2 January 1960	ÖVP	5B – Flachgau-Tennengau	Salzburg		
	Gerald Hauser	30 September 1961	FPÖ	7 – Tyrol	Tyrol		
	Gabriele Heinisch-Hosek	16 December 1961	SPÖ	Federal list	Federal list		
	Werner Herbert	29 August 1963	FPÖ	3G – Lower Austria East	Lower Austria		
	Eva-Maria Himmelbauer	24 December 1986	ÖVP	3A – Weinviertel	Lower Austria		
	Christian Höbart	9 June 1975	FPÖ	3F – Thermenregion	Lower Austria		
	Irene Hochstetter-Lackner	25 April 1973	SPÖ	2 – Carinthia	Carinthia		
	Norbert Hofer	2 March 1971	FPÖ	1 – Burgenland	Burgenland	Third President of the National Council (9 Nov. 2017 – 18 Dec. 2017); Resigned on 18 December 2017; replaced by Christian Ries; Moved up on 24 May 2019 after the resignation of Christian Ries; Chairman of the FPÖ parliamentary group (27 May 2019 – dissolution)	
	Manfred Hofinger	27 February 1970	ÖVP	4 – Upper Austria	Upper Austria		
	Johann Höfinger	18 July 1969	ÖVP	3D – Lower Austria Centre	Lower Austria		
	Daniela Holzinger-Vogtenhuber	21 October 1987	JETZT	4 – Upper Austria	Upper Austria		
	Eva Maria Holzleitner	5 May 1993	SPÖ	4 – Upper Austria	Upper Austria		
	Douglas Hoyos-Trauttmansdorff	8 September 1990	NEOS	Federal list	Federal list		
	Johanna Jachs	16 October 1991	ÖVP	4E – Mühlviertel	Upper Austria		
	Johannes Jarolim	27 December 1954	SPÖ	9C – Vienna Inner East	Vienna		
	Carmen Jeitler-Cincelli	27 July 1980	ÖVP	3F – Thermenregion	Lower Austria		
	Hans-Jörg Jenewein	12 June 1974	FPÖ	9 – Vienna	Vienna		
	Alois Kainz	22 May 1964	FPÖ	3 – Lower Austria	Lower Austria	Moved up on 20 December 2017 after the resignation of Herbert Kickl; Resigned on 23 May 2019; replaced by Herbert Kickl; Moved up on 1 July 2019 after the resignation of Walter Rosenkranz	
	Gerhard Kaniak	6 March 1979	FPÖ	4C – Hausruckviertel	Upper Austria		
	Axel Kassegger	4 January 1966	FPÖ	6A – Greater Graz	Styria		
	Martina Kaufmann	7 January 1986	ÖVP	6A – Greater Graz	Styria		
	Dietmar Keck	27 April 1957	SPÖ	4A – Greater Linz	Upper Austria		
	Herbert Kickl	19 October 1968	FPÖ	3 – Lower Austria	Lower Austria	Resigned on 18 December 2017, replaced by Alois Kainz; Moved up on 24 May 2019 after the resignation of Alois Kainz	
	Rebecca Kirchbaumer	25 August 1974	ÖVP	7B – Innsbruck Rural	Tyrol		
	Anneliese Kitzmüller	3 July 1959	FPÖ	4E – Mühlviertel	Upper Austria	Third President of the National Council (20 Dec. 2017 – dissolution)	
	Wolfgang Knes	24 February 1964	SPÖ	2D – Carinthia East	Carinthia		
	Andreas Kollross	8 January 1971	SPÖ	3F – Thermenregion	Lower Austria		
	Ulrike Königsberger-Ludwig	12 May 1965	SPÖ	3C – Mostviertel	Lower Austria		
	Karlheinz Kopf	27 June 1957	ÖVP	8B – Vorarlberg South	Vorarlberg		
	Elisabeth Köstinger	22 November 1978	ÖVP	2 – Carinthia	Carinthia	President of the National Council (9 Nov. 2017 – 17 Dec. 2017); Resigned on 22 December 2018, replaced by Angelika Kuss-Bergner; Moved up on 12 June 2019 after the resignation of Angelika Kuss-Bergner	
	Christian Kovacevic	6 August 1983	SPÖ	7 – Tyrol	Tyrol		
	Kai Jan Krainer	9 September 1968	SPÖ	9A – Vienna Inner South	Vienna		
	Stephanie Krisper	24 May 1980	NEOS	9 – Vienna	Vienna		
	Hermann Krist	21 July 1959	SPÖ	4A – Greater Linz	Upper Austria		
	Katharina Kucharowits	19 September 1983	SPÖ	Federal list	Federal list	Moved up on 16 November 2018 after the resignation of Christian Kern	
	Philip Kucher	29 September 1981	SPÖ	2A – Klagenfurt	Carinthia		
	Gudrun Kugler	12 November 1976	ÖVP	9G – Vienna North	Vienna		
	Andreas Kühberger	24 April 1974	ÖVP	6D – Upper Styria	Styria		
	Günther Kumpitsch	7 July 1960	FPÖ	6A – Greater Graz	Styria		
	Andrea Kuntzl	31 March 1958	SPÖ	9 – Vienna	Vienna		
	Robert Laimer	3 August 1966	SPÖ	3D – Lower Austria Centre	Lower Austria		
	David Lasar	5 October 1952	Independent	9G – Vienna North	Vienna	Elected for the FPÖ, left the party on 28 June 2019	
	Christian Lausch	2 December 1969	FPÖ	3 – Lower Austria	Lower Austria		
	Jörg Leichtfried	18 June 1967	SPÖ	6D – Upper Styria	Styria		
	Josef Lettenbichler	10 December 1970	ÖVP	7C – Lowland	Tyrol	Moved up on 31 January 2018 after the resignation of Andrä Rupprechter	
	Maximilian Linder	22 March 1965	FPÖ	2 – Carinthia	Carinthia		
	Klaus Lindinger	22 October 1988	ÖVP	4C – Hausruckviertel	Upper Austria		
	Mario Lindner	30 March 1982	SPÖ	Federal list	Federal list		
	Jessi Lintl	30 June 1956	FPÖ	9 – Vienna	Vienna		
	Daniela List	9 August 1968	ÖVP	6C – West Styria	Styria	Moved up on 1 July 2019 after the resignation of Werner Amon	
	Gerald Loacker	28 November 1973	NEOS	Federal list	Federal list		
	Reinhold Lopatka	27 January 1960	ÖVP	6B – East Styria	Styria		
	Angela Lueger	17 October 1965	SPÖ	9G – Vienna North	Vienna		
	Robert Lugar	9 July 1970	FPÖ	Federal list	Federal list		
	Karl Mahrer	4 March 1955	ÖVP	Federal list	Federal list	Elected for constituency 9 – Vienna; Moved up to the federal list on 24 January 2018 after the resignation of Sebastian Kurz	
	Nico Marchetti	19 February 1990	ÖVP	9D – Vienna South	Vienna		
	Doris Margreiter	14 November 1968	SPÖ	4C – Hausruckviertel	Upper Austria		
	Christoph Matznetter	8 June 1959	SPÖ	9 – Vienna	Vienna	Moved up on 2 July 2019 after the resignation of Andreas Schieder	
	Beate Meinl-Reisinger	25 April 1978	NEOS	Federal list	Federal list	Chairwoman of NEOS – The New Austria and Liberal Forum (23 Jun. 2018 – dissolution); Moved up on 18 October 2018 after the resignation of Matthias Strolz; Chairwoman of the NEOS parliamentary group (18 Oct. 2018 – dissolution)	
	Wendelin Mölzer	7 March 1980	FPÖ	Federal list	Federal list		
	Josef Moser	6 October 1955	ÖVP	Federal list	Federal list	Resigned on 22 January 2018; replaced by Kira Grünberg; Moved up on 12 June 2019 after the resignation of Franz Hörl	
	Josef Muchitsch	21 August 1967	SPÖ	6C – West Styria	Styria		
	Edith Mühlberghuber	22 October 1964	FPÖ	3C – Mostviertel	Lower Austria		
	Karl Nehammer	18 October 1972	ÖVP	9 – Vienna	Vienna		
	Werner Neubauer	29 October 1956	FPÖ	Federal list	Federal list		
	Therese Niss	31 July 1977	ÖVP	9 – Vienna	Vienna		
	Alfred J. Noll	30 January 1960	JETZT	3 – Lower Austria	Lower Austria	Elected on the federal list Moved up to constituency 3 on 8 June 2018 after the resignation of Peter Kolba	
	Verena Nussbaum	19 February 1970	SPÖ	6A – Greater Graz	Styria		
	Gabriel Obernosterer	13 May 1955	ÖVP	2 – Carinthia	Carinthia		
	Friedrich Ofenauer	9 January 1973	ÖVP	3D – Lower Austria Centre	Lower Austria		
	Andreas Ottenschläger	7 May 1975	ÖVP	9F – Vienna North-West	Vienna		
	Christian Pewny	17 May 1967	FPÖ	5C – Lungau-Pinzgau-Pongau	Salzburg		
	Elisabeth Pfurtscheller	6 March 1964	ÖVP	7D – Highland	Tyrol	Moved up on 6 September 2018 after the resignation of Dominik Schrott	
	Peter Pilz	22 January 1954	JETZT	Federal list	Federal list	Moved up on 8 June 2018 after the resignation of Peter Kolba	
	Claudia Plakolm	10 December 1994	ÖVP	4 – Upper Austria	Upper Austria		
	Rudolf Plessl	12 February 1967	SPÖ	3G – Lower Austria East	Lower Austria		
	Laurenz Pöttinger	25 September 1964	ÖVP	4C – Hausruckviertel	Upper Austria	Moved up on 2 July 2019 after the resignation of Angelika Winzig	
	Brigitte Povysil	5 March 1954	FPÖ	4 – Upper Austria	Upper Austria		
	Erwin Preiner	15 September 1962	SPÖ	1A – Burgenland North	Burgenland		
	Nikolaus Prinz	25 July 1962	ÖVP	4 – Upper Austria	Upper Austria		
	Christian Ragger	20 February 1973	FPÖ	2D – Carinthia East	Carinthia		
	Walter Rauch	7 February 1978	FPÖ	6B – East Styria	Styria		
	Volker Reifenberger	5 April 1979	FPÖ	5B – Flachgau-Tennengau	Salzburg	Moved up on 13 June 2018 after the resignation of Marlene Svazek	
	Pamela Rendi-Wagner	7 May 1971	SPÖ	Federal list	Federal list	Chairwoman of the Social Democratic Party of Austria (24 Nov. 2018 – dissolution); Chairwoman of the SPÖ parliamentary group (8 Oct. 2018 – dissolution)	
	Josef Riemer	21 March 1950	FPÖ	6C – West Styria	Styria		
	Alois Rosenberger	5 January 1960	ÖVP	Federal list	Federal list		
	Bruno Rossmann	16 April 1952	JETZT	Federal list	Federal list	Chairman of the PILZ/JETZT parliamentary group (1 Jun. 2018 – dissolution)	
	Gertraud Salzmann	18 June 1964	ÖVP	5 – Salzburg	Salzburg	Moved up on 13 June 2018 after the resignation of Stefan Schnöll	
	Birgit Sandler	1 January 1964	SPÖ	6D – Upper Styria	Styria		
	Christian Schandor	14 September 1974	FPÖ	6B – East Styria	Styria		
	Andrea-Michaela Schartel	30 June 1964	FPÖ	Federal list	Federal list	Moved up on 29 January 2018 after the resignation of Heinz-Christian Strache	
	Sabine Schatz	9 September 1978	SPÖ	4E – Mühlviertel	Upper Austria		
	Sepp Schellhorn	12 May 1967	NEOS	Federal list	Federal list		
	Nikolaus Scherak	16 October 1986	NEOS	3 – Lower Austria	Lower Austria		
	Carmen Schimanek	25 June 1965	FPÖ	7 – Tyrol	Tyrol		
	Karl Schmidhofer	6 May 1962	ÖVP	7 – Tyrol	Tyrol	Moved up on 10 April 2019 after the death of Barbara Wolfgang-Krenn	
	Peter Schmiedlechner	16 September 1982	FPÖ	3E – Lower Austria South	Lower Austria		
	Johannes Schmuckenschlager	20 September 1978	ÖVP	3 – Lower Austria	Lower Austria		
	Philipp Schrangl	14 March 1985	FPÖ	4A – Greater Linz	Upper Austria		
	Gabriela Schwarz	3 September 1962	ÖVP	Federal list	Federal list		
	Norbert Sieber	12 January 1969	ÖVP	8A – Vorarlberg North	Vorarlberg		
	Maria Smodics-Neumann	5 April 1970	ÖVP	9 – Vienna	Vienna	Moved up on 24 January 2018 after the resignation of Sebastian Kurz	
	Wolfgang Sobotka	5 January 1956	ÖVP	3 – Lower Austria	Lower Austria	President of the National Council (20 Dec. 2017 – dissolution)	
	Christoph Stark	1 April 1963	ÖVP	6B – East Styria	Styria		
	Harald Stefan	12 September 1965	FPÖ	Federal list	Federal list		
	Petra Steger	4 October 1987	FPÖ	Federal list	Federal list	Elected for constituency 9 – Vienna; Moved up to the federal list on 20 December 2017 after the resignation of Maximilian Krauss	
	Michaela Steinacker	30 June 1952	ÖVP	3 – Lower Austria	Lower Austria		
	Christian Stocker	20 March 1960	ÖVP	3E – Lower Austria South	Lower Austria	Moved up on 12 June 2019 after the resignation of Johann Rädler	
	Alois Stöger	3 September 1960	SPÖ	4 – Upper Austria	Upper Austria		
	Georg Strasser	29 June 1971	ÖVP	3C – Mostviertel	Lower Austria		
	Rudolf Taschner	30 March 1953	ÖVP	Federal list	Federal list		
	Harald Troch	2 May 1959	SPÖ	9D – Vienna South	Vienna		
	Markus Tschank	6 January 1979	FPÖ	9E – Vienna South West	Vienna		
	Maximilian Unterrainer	20 February 1964	SPÖ	7B – Innsbruck Rural	Tyrol		
	Markus Vogl	27 November 1970	SPÖ	4D – Traunviertel	Upper Austria		
	Petra Wagner	16 August 1968	FPÖ	Federal list	Federal list		
	Sandra Wassermann	25 November 1984	FPÖ	2 – Carinthia	Carinthia		
	Peter Weidinger	21 November 1977	ÖVP	2 – Carinthia	Carinthia	Moved up on 9 January 2020 after the resignation of Elisabeth Köstinger	
	Petra Wimmer	13 December 1965	SPÖ	4C – Hausruckviertel	Upper Austria		
	Rainer Wimmer	10 August 1955	SPÖ	Federal list	Federal list	Moved up on 18 October 2018 after the resignation of Wolfgang Katzian	
	Peter Wittmann	8 March 1957	SPÖ	3E – Lower Austria South	Lower Austria		
	August Wöginger	2 November 1974	ÖVP	4B – Innviertel	Upper Austria	Chairman of the ÖVP parliamentary group (20 Dec. 2017 – dissolution)	
	Sandra Wohlschlager	25 February 1976	FPÖ	4C – Hausruckviertel	Upper Austria	Moved up on 2 July after the resignation of Roman Haider	
	Peter Wurm	23 February 1965	FPÖ	7B – Innsbruck Rural	Tyrol		
	Selma Yildirim	25 August 1969	SPÖ	7 – Tyrol	Tyrol		
	Nurten Yılmaz	17 September 1957	SPÖ	9F – Vienna North-West	Vienna		
	Alma Zadić	24 May 1984	Independent	Federal list	Federal list	Elected for the Peter Pilz List, expelled on 9 July 2019	
	Wolfgang Zanger	4 December 1968	FPÖ	6D – Upper Styria	Styria		
	Christoph Zarits	16 September 1980	ÖVP	1A – Burgenland North	Burgenland		
	Wolfgang Zinggl	12 December 1954	JETZT	9 – Vienna	Vienna		

== List of former members ==
Image	Name	Date of birth	Party	Constituency	State	Notes	Ref.
	Werner Amon	28 May 1969	ÖVP	6C – West Styria	Styria	Resigned on 30 June 2019; Replaced by Daniela List	
	Angela Fichtinger	29 December 1956	ÖVP	3B – Waldviertel	Lower Austria	Resigned on 11 June 2019; Replaced by Lukas Brandweiner	
	Claudia Gamon	23 December 1988	NEOS	9 – Vienna	Vienna	Resigned on 30 June 2019; Replaced by Doris Hager-Hämmerle	
	Johann Gudenus	20 July 1976	FPÖ	9 – Vienna	Vienna	Moved up on 20 December 2017 after the resignation of Maximilian Krauss; Resigned on 18 May 2019; Replaced by Hubert Fuchs	
	Roman Haider	13 April 1967	FPÖ	4C – Hausruckviertel	Upper Austria	Elected for constituency 4 – Upper Austria; Moved up to constituency 4C on 22 May 2019 after the resignation of Wolfgang Klinger; Resigned on 1 July 2019; Replaced by Sandra Wohlschlager	
	Franz Hörl	4 December 1956	ÖVP	7 – Tyrol	Tyrol	Moved up on 24 January 2018 after the resignation of Josef Moser; Resigned on 11 June 2019; Replaced by Josef Moser	
	Wolfgang Katzian	28 October 1956	SPÖ	Federal list	Federal list	Resigned on 26 September 2018; Replaced by Rainer Wimmer	
	Christian Kern	4 January 1966	SPÖ	Federal list	Federal list	Chairman of the Social Democratic Party of Austria; Chairman of the SPÖ parliamentary group (Constitution – 8 Oct. 2018); Resigned on 15 November 2018; Replaced by Katharina Kucharowits	
	Wolfgang Klinger	10 May 1959	FPÖ	4C – Hausruckviertel	Upper Austria	Resigned on 22 May 2019; Replaced by Thomas Dim	
	Peter Kolba	17 January 1959	PILZ	3 – Lower Austria	Lower Austria	Chairman of the PILZ parliamentary group (Constitution – 1 Jun. 2018); Resigned on 4 June 2018; Replaced by Peter Pilz	
	Ulrike Königsberger-Ludwig	12 May 1965	SPÖ	3C – Mostviertel	Lower Austria	Resigned on 21 March 2018; Replaced by Renate Gruber	
	Maximilian Krauss	8 February 1993	FPÖ	Federal list	Federal list	Resigned on 18 December 2017; Replaced by Johann Gudenus	
	Barbara Krenn	19 December 1969	ÖVP	6D – Upper Styria	Styria	Died on 3 April 2019; Replaced by Karl Schmidhofer	
	Sebastian Kurz	27 August 1986	ÖVP	Federal list	Federal list	Chairman of the Austrian People's Party; Chairman of the ÖVP parliamentary group (Constitution – 20 Dec. 2017); Resigned on 22 December 2017; Replaced by Maria Smodics-Neumann	
	Angelika Kuss-Bergner	6 November 1972	ÖVP	2 – Carinthia	Carinthia	Moved up on 24 January 2018 after the resignation of Elisabeth Köstinger; Resigned on 11 June 2019; Replaced by Elisabeth Köstinger	
	Johann Rädler	13 June 1952	ÖVP	3E – Lower Austria South	Lower Austria	Resigned on 11 June 2019; Replaced by Christian Stocker	
	Christian Ries	20 January 1972	FPÖ	1 – Burgenland	Burgenland	Moved up on 20 December 2017 after the resignation of Norbert Hofer; Resigned on 24 May 2019; Replaced by Norbert Hofer	
	Walter Rosenkranz	29 July 1962	FPÖ	3B – Waldviertel	Lower Austria	Chairman of the FPÖ parliamentary group (19 Dec. 2017 – 27 May 2019); Resigned on 30 June 2019; Replaced by Alois Kainz	
	Andrä Rupprechter	31 May 1961	ÖVP	7C – Lowland	Tyrol	Resigned on 30 January 2018; Replaced by Josef Lettenbichler	
	Andreas Schieder	16 April 1969	SPÖ	9 – Vienna	Vienna	Resigned on 1 July 2019; Replaced by Christoph Matznetter	
	Stefan Schnöll	13 March 1988	ÖVP	5 – Salzburg	Salzburg	Resigned on 12 June 2018; Replaced by Gertraud Salzmann	
	Dominik Schrott	3 December 1987	ÖVP	7D – Highland	Tyrol	Resigned on 4 September 2018; Replaced by Elisabeth Pfurtscheller	
	Josef Smolle	23 August 1958	ÖVP	6 – Styria	Styria	Moved up on 24 January 2018 after the resignation of Juliane Bogner-Strauß; Resigned on 5 June 2019; Replaced by Juliane Bogner-Strauß	
	Heinz-Christian Strache	12 June 1969	FPÖ	Federal list	Federal list	Chairman of the Freedom Party of Austria; Chairman of the FPÖ parliamentary group (Constitution – 20 Dec. 2017); Resigned on 26 January 2018; Replaced by Andrea-Michaela Schartel	
	Matthias Strolz	10 June 1973	NEOS	Federal list	Federal list	Chairman of NEOS – The New Austria and Liberal Forum; Chairman of the NEOS parliamentary group (Constitution – 26 Sep. 2018); Resigned on 26 September 2018; Replaced by Beate Meinl-Reisinger	
	Marlene Svazek	13 May 1992	FPÖ	5B – Flachgau-Tennengau	Salzburg	Resigned on 12 June 2018; Replaced by Volker Reifenberger	
	Angelika Winzig	9 May 1963	ÖVP	4C – Hausruckviertel	Upper Austria	Resigned on 2 July 2019; Replaced by Laurenz Pöttinger	
