= Claudia Bauer =

Austrian politician (born 1994)

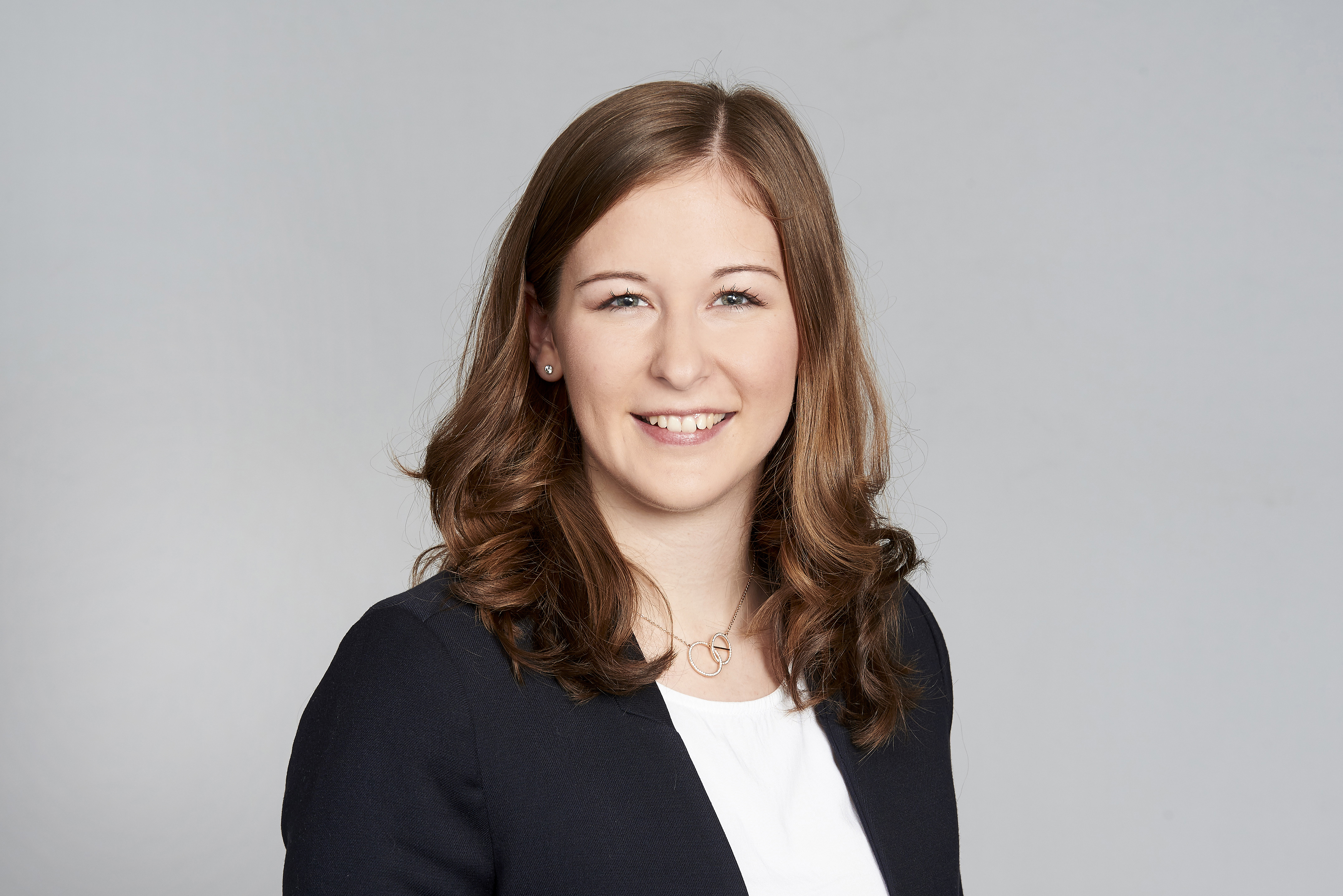
- Official portrait, 2017

Minister for Europe, Integration and Family
- Incumbent
- Assumed office 3 March 2025

State Secretary in the Chancellery for Youth and Generations
- In office 6 December 2021 – 3 March 2025
- President: Alexander Van der Bellen
- Chancellor: Karl Nehammer

Member of the National Council for Upper Austria
- In office 9 November 2017 – 6 December 2021

Personal details
- Born: 10 December 1994 (age 31) Linz, Austria
- Spouse: Christoph Bauer (m. 2026)
- Education: High School

Claudia Bauer (born 10 December 1994 as Claudia Plakolm) is an Austrian politician of the Austrian People's Party (ÖVP). She served as a member of the National Council from 9 November 2017. Since 15 May 2021 she has been the federal chairwoman of the Young People's Party (JVP). On 3 March 2025 she became Federal Minister for Europe, Integration and Family in the Christian Stocker government. Before this, she served as State Secretary in the Karl Nehammer government.

== Life ==
Born in Linz, Bauer was the third of four siblings and grew up in Walding. Her father is the local ÖVP mayor Johann Plakolm. After graduating from high school at Kreuzschwestern Linz school center in 2013, she first began studying economics at the Vienna University of Economics and Business, and has been studying business education at the Johannes Kepler University Linz since October 2014.

== Politics ==
=== Beginnings ===
In the school year 2012/13, she was the Upper Austrian state school spokesperson for the AHS area, and in 2013/14, she acted as state chairwoman of the ÖVP-related Union of Higher Students (UHS). Since February 2015, she has been the deputy district chairwoman of the Young ÖVP in the Urfahr-Umgebung District. In October 2016, she was elected regional chairwoman of the Young ÖVP Upper Austria, in April 2019, she was re-elected for three years. Since the municipal council and mayoral elections in Upper Austria in 2015, she has represented the ÖVP in the municipal council of Walding, and since 2016 she has also been part of the state party executive of the ÖVP Upper Austria.

=== National Council ===
On 9 November 2017, at the age of 22, she was the youngest member of the XXVI. Legislative period for the Austrian National Council promised. In the course of the formation of the federal government shortly after the National Council election, she negotiated on the ÖVP side in the Family and Youth Section. At the Bundestag of the Young People's Party on 25 November 2017, she was elected Deputy Federal Chairman. In the ÖVP parliamentary club, she acts as a youth spokesperson.

In the 2019 National Council election, she ran behind ÖVP top candidate August Wöginger in second place in the list in the Upper Austria electoral district. Bauer was re-elected to the committee, but in the XXVII. Legislative period, she is no longer its youngest member. Yannick Shetty of NEOS now holds this status. As part of the coalition negotiations for the formation of a government in 2019, she negotiates in the main group Social Security, New Justice and Poverty Reduction.

In June 2020, she was designated as the successor to Stefan Schnöll as federal chairwoman of the young ÖVP. On 15 May 2021 she was elected with 94.39 percent of the vote for successor of Schnöll.

=== State Secretary ===
On 6 December 2021 she was sworn in as a member of the Nehammer federal government as State Secretary for Youth and Generations in the Federal Chancellery. Her National Council mandate went to Andrea Holzner.

=== Minister ===
In 2025 Bauer became Minister for Europe, Integration and Family in the Stocker government.

=== Criticism ===
Bauer's planned headscarf ban for girls under 14 years of age at state schools has been criticized by the largest official representation of Islam in Austria (IGGÖ – Community of Muslim Believers in Austria). Bauer has been working on the introduction of a law banning so-called political Islam.
