= Šimánek =

Šimánek (feminine Šimánková) is a Czech surname. Notable people with the surname include:

- Jana Šimánková (born 1980), Czech volleyball player
- Jiří Šimánek (disambiguation), multiple people
- Leoš Šimánek (1946–2026), Czech traveler
- Otto Šimánek (1925–1992), Czech actor
- Robert E. Simanek (1930–2022), American marine

== See also ==
- Schimanek, Germanized form of the surname
