= Schimanek =

Schimanek is a surname used in Austria. Notable people with the surname include:

- Carmen Schimanek (born 1965), Austrian accountant and politician
- Hans Jörg Schimanek (1940–2024), Austrian journalist and politician

== See also ==
- Šimánek, Czech surname
