= Vienna Inner East (National Council electoral district) =

Parliamentary electoral district in Austria

- Wien Innen-Ost
- Electoral District for the National Council
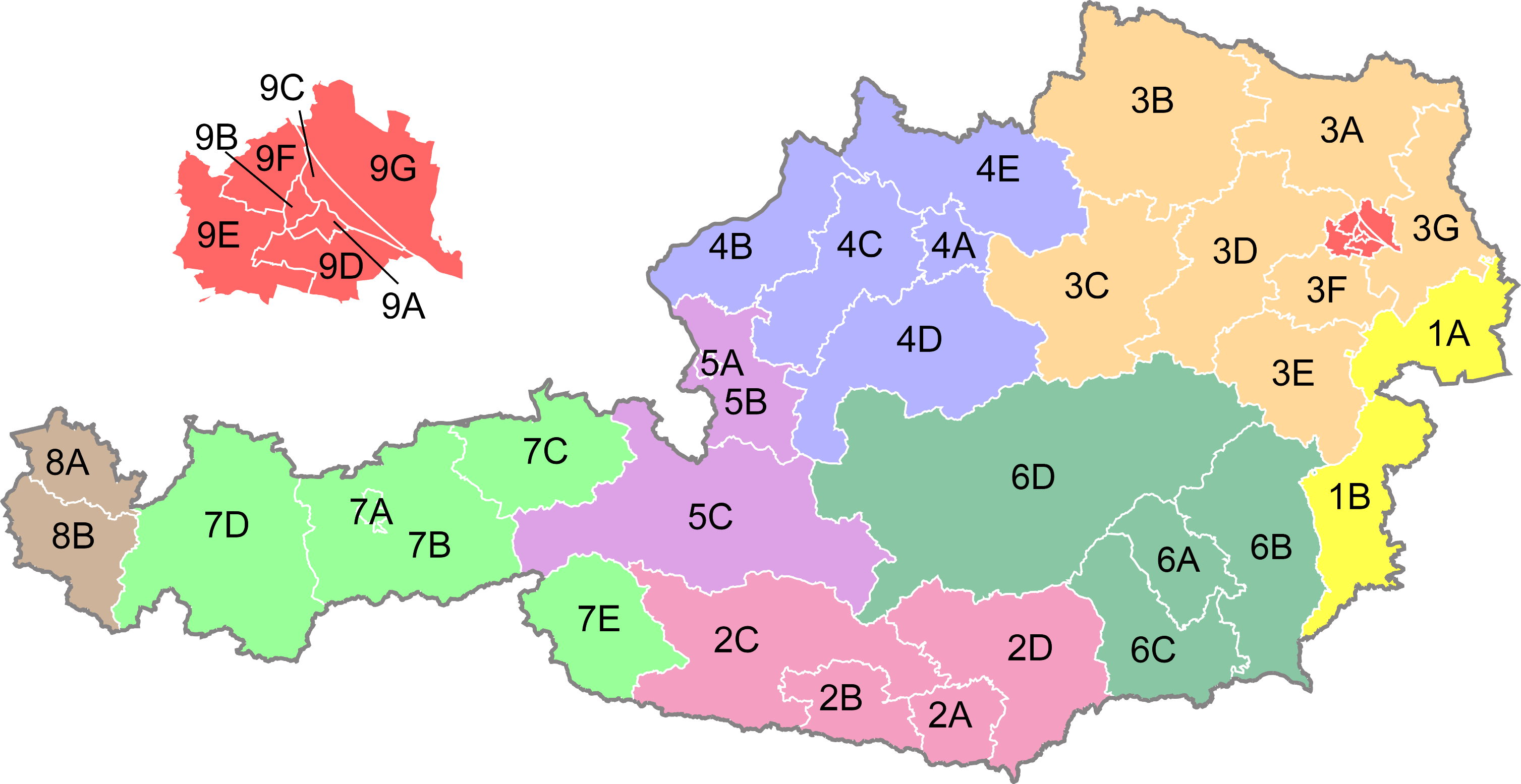
- The 39 regional electoral districts
- District: List: Brigittenau; Leopoldstadt
- State: Vienna
- Population: 197,030 (2024)
- Electorate: 106,083 (2019)
- Area: 25 km^{2} (2023)

Current Electoral District
- Created: 1994
- Seats: 3 (1994–present)
- Created from: Vienna

Vienna Inner East (German: Wien Innen-Ost), also known as Electoral District 9C (German: Wahlkreis 9C), is one of the 39 multi-member regional electoral districts of the National Council, the lower house of the Austrian Parliament, the national legislature of Austria. The electoral district was created in 1992 when electoral regulations were amended to add regional electoral districts to the existing state-wide electoral districts and came into being at the following legislative election in 1994. It consists of the districts of Brigittenau and Leopoldstadt in the city-state of Vienna. The electoral district currently elects three of the 183 members of the National Council using the open party-list proportional representation electoral system. At the 2019 legislative election the constituency had 106,083 registered electors.

== History ==
Vienna Inner East was one 43 regional electoral districts (regionalwahlkreise) established by the "National Council Electoral Regulations 1992" (Nationalrats-Wahlordnung 1992) passed by the National Council in 1992. It consisted of the districts of Brigittenau and Leopoldstadt in the city-state of Vienna. The district was initially allocated three seats in May 1993.

== Electoral system ==
Vienna Inner East currently elects three of the 183 members of the National Council using the open party-list proportional representation electoral system. The allocation of seats is carried out in three stages. In the first stage, seats are allocated to parties (lists) at the regional level using a state-wide Hare quota (wahlzahl) (valid votes in the state divided by the number of seats in the state). In the second stage, seats are allocated to parties at the state/provincial level using the state-wide Hare quota (any seats won by the party at the regional stage are subtracted from the party's state seats). In the third and final stage, seats are allocated to parties at the federal/national level using the D'Hondt method (any seats won by the party at the regional and state stages are subtracted from the party's federal seats). Only parties that reach the 4% national threshold, or have won a seat at the regional stage, compete for seats at the state and federal stages.

Electors may cast one preferential vote for individual candidates at the regional, state and federal levels. Split-ticket voting (panachage), or voting for more than one candidate at each level, is not permitted and will result in the ballot paper being invalidated. At the regional level, candidates must receive preferential votes amounting to at least 14% of the valid votes cast for their party to over-ride the order of the party list (10% and 7% respectively for the state and federal levels). Prior to April 2013 electors could not cast preferential votes at the federal level and the thresholds candidates needed to over-ride the party list order were higher at the regional level (half the Hare quota or 1/6 of the party votes) and state level (Hare quota).

== Election results ==
=== Summary ===
Election	Communists KPÖ+ / KPÖ			Social Democrats SPÖ			Greens GRÜNE			NEOS NEOS / LiF			People's ÖVP			Freedom FPÖ		
Election	Votes	%	Seats	Votes	%	Seats	Votes	%	Seats	Votes	%	Seats	Votes	%	Seats	Votes	%	Seats
2019	752	1.03%	0	22,046	30.06%	0	18,363	25.04%	0	6,347	8.65%	0	14,571	19.87%	0	8,227	11.22%	0
2017	1,423	1.82%	0	30,435	38.91%	1	6,066	7.76%	0	4,525	5.79%	0	13,356	17.08%	0	14,931	19.09%	0
2013	1,531	2.12%	0	24,903	34.56%	1	14,118	19.59%	0	4,646	6.45%	0	8,132	11.28%	0	13,696	19.00%	0
2008	1,035	1.36%	0	28,890	37.88%	1	12,915	16.93%	0	3,128	4.10%	0	9,588	12.57%	0	15,788	20.70%	0
2006	1,131	1.51%	0	33,420	44.61%	1	13,262	17.70%	0				12,930	17.26%	0	10,559	14.10%	0
2002	623	0.78%	0	37,581	47.17%	1	12,174	15.28%	0	905	1.14%	0	20,774	26.08%	0	7,019	8.81%	0
1999	897	1.19%	0	30,513	40.65%	1	7,592	10.11%	0	4,619	6.15%	0	9,746	12.98%	0	20,030	26.68%	0
1995	409	0.50%	0	39,033	47.65%	1	4,765	5.82%	0	5,933	7.24%	0	12,332	15.05%	0	18,291	22.33%	0
1994	443	0.57%	0	32,284	41.84%	1	6,891	8.93%	0	6,595	8.55%	0	10,324	13.38%	0	19,555	25.34%	0

=== Detailed ===
==== 2010s ====
===== 2019 =====
Results of the 2019 legislative election held on 29 September 2019:

Party		Votes per district			Total votes	%	Seats
Party		Brigit- tenau	Leo- pold- stadt	Voting card	Total votes	%	Seats
Social Democratic Party of Austria	SPÖ	10,228	11,524	294	22,046	30.06%	0
The Greens – The Green Alternative	GRÜNE	6,008	11,835	520	18,363	25.04%	0
Austrian People's Party	ÖVP	6,158	8,038	375	14,571	19.87%	0
Freedom Party of Austria	FPÖ	4,012	4,054	161	8,227	11.22%	0
NEOS – The New Austria	NEOS	2,012	4,126	209	6,347	8.65%	0
JETZT	JETZT	842	1,264	47	2,153	2.94%	0
KPÖ Plus	KPÖ+	306	433	13	752	1.03%	0
Der Wandel	WANDL	194	251	18	463	0.63%	0
The Beer Party	BIER	178	234	9	421	0.57%	0
Valid Votes		29,938	41,759	1,646	73,343	100.00%	0
Rejected Votes		245	304	9	558	0.76%	
Total Polled		30,183	42,063	1,655	73,901	69.66%	
Registered Electors		46,247	59,836		106,083		
Turnout		65.26%	70.30%		69.66%		

===== 2017 =====
Results of the 2017 legislative election held on 15 October 2017:

Party		Votes per district			Total votes	%	Seats
Party		Brigit- tenau	Leo- pold- stadt	Voting card	Total votes	%	Seats
Social Democratic Party of Austria	SPÖ	13,059	16,841	535	30,435	38.91%	1
Freedom Party of Austria	FPÖ	7,318	7,352	261	14,931	19.09%	0
Austrian People's Party	ÖVP	5,355	7,633	368	13,356	17.08%	0
Peter Pilz List	PILZ	2,351	3,839	162	6,352	8.12%	0
The Greens – The Green Alternative	GRÜNE	1,935	3,944	187	6,066	7.76%	0
NEOS – The New Austria	NEOS	1,494	2,859	172	4,525	5.79%	0
Communist Party of Austria	KPÖ	517	877	29	1,423	1.82%	0
My Vote Counts!	GILT	326	352	19	697	0.89%	0
The Whites	WEIßE	38	54	4	96	0.12%	0
Free List Austria	FLÖ	48	41	5	94	0.12%	0
Homeless in Politics	ODP	58	35	0	93	0.12%	0
Socialist Left Party	SLP	39	39	0	78	0.10%	0
EU Exit Party	EUAUS	28	32	5	65	0.08%	0
Valid Votes		32,566	43,898	1,747	78,211	100.00%	1
Rejected Votes		319	320	6	645	0.82%	
Total Polled		32,885	44,218	1,753	78,856	73.18%	
Registered Electors		47,532	60,225		107,757		
Turnout		69.18%	73.42%		73.18%		

The following candidates were elected:

- Party mandates - Johannes Jarolim (SPÖ), 1,391 votes.

===== 2013 =====
Results of the 2013 legislative election held on 29 September 2013:

Party		Votes per district			Total votes	%	Seats
Party		Brigit- tenau	Leo- pold- stadt	Voting card	Total votes	%	Seats
Social Democratic Party of Austria	SPÖ	11,910	12,613	380	24,903	34.56%	1
The Greens – The Green Alternative	GRÜNE	4,773	8,921	424	14,118	19.59%	0
Freedom Party of Austria	FPÖ	6,918	6,578	200	13,696	19.00%	0
Austrian People's Party	ÖVP	3,220	4,641	271	8,132	11.28%	0
NEOS – The New Austria	NEOS	1,600	2,882	164	4,646	6.45%	0
Team Stronach	FRANK	1,091	1,434	57	2,582	3.58%	0
Communist Party of Austria	KPÖ	528	972	31	1,531	2.12%	0
Alliance for the Future of Austria	BZÖ	549	761	51	1,361	1.89%	0
Pirate Party of Austria	PIRAT	311	461	17	789	1.09%	0
Der Wandel	WANDL	59	111	9	179	0.25%	0
Socialist Left Party	SLP	64	64	2	130	0.18%	0
Valid Votes		31,023	39,438	1,606	72,067	100.00%	1
Rejected Votes		415	520	20	955	1.31%	
Total Polled		31,438	39,958	1,626	73,022	66.38%	
Registered Electors		49,872	60,141		110,013		
Turnout		63.04%	66.44%		66.38%		

The following candidates were elected:

- Party mandates - Johannes Jarolim (SPÖ), 1,543 votes.

==== 2000s ====
===== 2008 =====
Results of the 2008 legislative election held on 28 September 2008:

Party		Votes per district			Total votes	%	Seats
Party		Brigit- tenau	Leo- pold- stadt	Voting card	Total votes	%	Seats
Social Democratic Party of Austria	SPÖ	13,704	13,801	1,385	28,890	37.88%	1
Freedom Party of Austria	FPÖ	7,934	7,185	669	15,788	20.70%	0
The Greens – The Green Alternative	GRÜNE	4,517	7,719	679	12,915	16.93%	0
Austrian People's Party	ÖVP	3,479	5,247	862	9,588	12.57%	0
Alliance for the Future of Austria	BZÖ	1,489	1,720	206	3,415	4.48%	0
Liberal Forum	LiF	1,099	1,858	171	3,128	4.10%	0
Communist Party of Austria	KPÖ	394	601	40	1,035	1.36%	0
Fritz Dinkhauser List – Citizens' Forum Tyrol	FRITZ	212	252	49	513	0.67%	0
Independent Citizens' Initiative Save Austria	RETTÖ	159	237	21	417	0.55%	0
The Christians	DC	91	132	17	240	0.31%	0
Animal Rights Party	TRP	88	91	8	187	0.25%	0
Left	LINKE	82	71	3	156	0.20%	0
Valid Votes		33,248	38,914	4,110	76,272	100.00%	1
Rejected Votes		514	552	73	1,139	1.47%	
Total Polled		33,762	39,466	4,183	77,411	70.14%	
Registered Electors		51,484	58,886		110,370		
Turnout		65.58%	67.02%		70.14%		

The following candidates were elected:

- Party mandates - Johannes Jarolim (SPÖ), 1,842 votes.

===== 2006 =====
Results of the 2006 legislative election held on 1 October 2006:

Party		Votes per district			Total votes	%	Seats
Party		Brigit- tenau	Leo- pold- stadt	Voting card	Total votes	%	Seats
Social Democratic Party of Austria	SPÖ	14,985	15,499	2,936	33,420	44.61%	1
The Greens – The Green Alternative	GRÜNE	4,350	7,279	1,633	13,262	17.70%	0
Austrian People's Party	ÖVP	4,571	6,354	2,005	12,930	17.26%	0
Freedom Party of Austria	FPÖ	5,060	4,708	791	10,559	14.10%	0
Hans-Peter Martin's List	MATIN	713	777	165	1,655	2.21%	0
Alliance for the Future of Austria	BZÖ	583	693	127	1,403	1.87%	0
Communist Party of Austria	KPÖ	422	604	105	1,131	1.51%	0
EU Withdrawal – Neutral Free Austria	NFÖ	133	120	28	281	0.38%	0
Socialist Left Party	SLP	131	118	20	269	0.36%	0
Valid Votes		30,948	36,152	7,810	74,910	100.00%	1
Rejected Votes		386	399	67	852	1.12%	
Total Polled		31,334	36,551	7,877	75,762	69.65%	
Registered Electors		50,522	58,260		108,782		
Turnout		62.02%	62.74%		69.65%		

The following candidates were elected:

- Party mandates - Johannes Jarolim (SPÖ), 2,029 votes.

===== 2002 =====
Results of the 2002 legislative election held on 24 November 2002:

Party		Votes per district			Total votes	%	Seats
Party		Brigit- tenau	Leo- pold- stadt	Voting card	Total votes	%	Seats
Social Democratic Party of Austria	SPÖ	17,273	17,859	2,449	37,581	47.17%	1
Austrian People's Party	ÖVP	8,243	10,419	2,112	20,774	26.08%	0
The Greens – The Green Alternative	GRÜNE	4,225	6,876	1,073	12,174	15.28%	0
Freedom Party of Austria	FPÖ	3,163	3,449	407	7,019	8.81%	0
Liberal Forum	LiF	387	454	64	905	1.14%	0
Communist Party of Austria	KPÖ	282	295	46	623	0.78%	0
Socialist Left Party	SLP	202	188	7	397	0.50%	0
The Democrats		90	97	10	197	0.25%	0
Valid Votes		33,865	39,637	6,168	79,670	100.00%	1
Rejected Votes		380	385	62	827	1.03%	
Total Polled		34,245	40,022	6,230	80,497	75.67%	
Registered Electors		49,649	56,732		106,381		
Turnout		68.97%	70.55%		75.67%		

The following candidates were elected:

- Party mandates - Johannes Jarolim (SPÖ), 2,253 votes.

==== 1990s ====
===== 1999 =====
Results of the 1999 legislative election held on 3 October 1999:

Party		Votes per district			Total votes	%	Seats
Party		Brigit- tenau	Leo- pold- stadt	Voting card	Total votes	%	Seats
Social Democratic Party of Austria	SPÖ	13,655	13,984	2,874	30,513	40.65%	1
Freedom Party of Austria	FPÖ	8,719	9,426	1,885	20,030	26.68%	0
Austrian People's Party	ÖVP	3,258	4,896	1,592	9,746	12.98%	0
The Greens – The Green Alternative	GRÜNE	2,576	4,144	872	7,592	10.11%	0
Liberal Forum	LiF	1,636	2,501	482	4,619	6.15%	0
The Independents	DU	589	580	90	1,259	1.68%	0
Communist Party of Austria	KPÖ	363	461	73	897	1.19%	0
No to NATO and EU – Neutral Austria Citizens' Initiative	NEIN	184	200	28	412	0.55%	0
Valid Votes		30,980	36,192	7,896	75,068	100.00%	1
Rejected Votes		514	505	59	1,078	1.42%	
Total Polled		31,494	36,697	7,955	76,146	72.29%	
Registered Electors		48,887	56,453		105,340		
Turnout		64.42%	65.00%		72.29%		

The following candidates were elected:

- Party mandates - Johannes Jarolim (SPÖ), 1,168 votes.

===== 1995 =====
Results of the 1995 legislative election held on 17 December 1995:

Party		Votes per district			Total votes	%	Seats
Party		Brigit- tenau	Leo- pold- stadt	Voting card	Total votes	%	Seats
Social Democratic Party of Austria	SPÖ	17,819	19,004	2,210	39,033	47.65%	1
Freedom Party of Austria	FPÖ	8,009	9,349	933	18,291	22.33%	0
Austrian People's Party	ÖVP	4,439	6,877	1,016	12,332	15.05%	0
Liberal Forum	LiF	2,234	3,314	385	5,933	7.24%	0
The Greens – The Green Alternative	GRÜNE	1,596	2,825	344	4,765	5.82%	0
No – Civic Action Group; Against the Sale of Austria	NEIN	449	483	62	994	1.21%	0
Communist Party of Austria	KPÖ	191	206	12	409	0.50%	0
Natural Law Party	ÖNP	67	83	14	164	0.20%	0
Valid Votes		34,804	42,141	4,976	81,921	100.00%	1
Rejected Votes		583	585	51	1,219	1.47%	
Total Polled		35,387	42,726	5,027	83,140	77.87%	
Registered Electors		48,460	58,303		106,763		
Turnout		73.02%	73.28%		77.87%		

The following candidates were elected:

- Party mandates - Brigitte Ederer (SPÖ), 5,560 votes.

Brigitte Ederer (SPÖ) resigned on 31 January 1997 and was replaced by Johannes Jarolim (SPÖ) from 11 February 1997.

===== 1994 =====
Results of the 1994 legislative election held on 9 October 1994:

Party		Votes per district			Total votes	%	Seats
Party		Brigit- tenau	Leo- pold- stadt	Voting card	Total votes	%	Seats
Social Democratic Party of Austria	SPÖ	14,786	14,901	2,597	32,284	41.84%	1
Freedom Party of Austria	FPÖ	8,254	9,690	1,611	19,555	25.34%	0
Austrian People's Party	ÖVP	3,425	5,467	1,432	10,324	13.38%	0
The Greens – The Green Alternative	GRÜNE	2,366	3,859	666	6,891	8.93%	0
Liberal Forum	LiF	2,394	3,598	603	6,595	8.55%	0
No – Civic Action Group; Against the Sale of Austria	NEIN	332	397	85	814	1.05%	0
Communist Party of Austria	KPÖ	191	217	35	443	0.57%	0
Natural Law Party	ÖNP	52	77	13	142	0.18%	0
United Greens Austria – List Adi Pinter	VGÖ	22	32	5	59	0.08%	0
Citizen Greens Austria – Free Democrats	BGÖ	13	36	7	56	0.07%	0
Valid Votes		31,835	38,274	7,054	77,163	100.00%	1
Rejected Votes		457	469	66	992	1.27%	
Total Polled		32,292	38,743	7,120	78,155	71.66%	
Registered Electors		49,675	59,385		109,060		
Turnout		65.01%	65.24%		71.66%		

The following candidates were elected:

- Party mandates - Brigitte Ederer (SPÖ), 4,808 votes.

Brigitte Ederer (SPÖ) resigned on 14 December 1994 and was replaced by Johannes Jarolim (SPÖ) from 15 December 1994. Johannes Jarolim (SPÖ) resigned on 5 November 1995 and was replaced by Brigitte Ederer (SPÖ) from 6 November 1995.
