= Highland (National Council electoral district) =

Parliamentary electoral district in Austria

- Oberland
- Electoral District for the National Council
- Location of Highland within Austria
- District: List: Imst; Landeck; Reutte
- State: Tyrol
- Population: 141,586 (2024)
- Electorate: 100,778 (2019)
- Area: 4,557 km^{2} (2023)

Current Electoral District
- Created: 1994
- Seats: 3 (1994–present)
- Members: Elisabeth Pfurtscheller (ÖVP)

Highland (German: Oberland), also known as Electoral District 7D (German: Wahlkreis 7D), is one of the 39 multi-member regional electoral districts of the National Council, the lower house of the Austrian Parliament, the national legislature of Austria. The electoral district was created in 1992 when electoral regulations were amended to add regional electoral districts to the existing state-wide electoral districts and came into being at the following legislative election in 1994. It consists of the districts of Imst, Landeck and Reutte in the state of Tyrol. The electoral district currently elects three of the 183 members of the National Council using the open party-list proportional representation electoral system. At the 2019 legislative election the constituency had 100,778 registered electors.

== History ==
Highland was one 43 regional electoral districts (regionalwahlkreise) established by the "National Council Electoral Regulations 1992" (Nationalrats-Wahlordnung 1992) passed by the National Council in 1992. It consisted of the districts of Imst, Landeck and Reutte in the state of Tyrol. The district was initially allocated three seats in May 1993.

== Electoral system ==
Highland currently elects three of the 183 members of the National Council using the open party-list proportional representation electoral system. The allocation of seats is carried out in three stages. In the first stage, seats are allocated to parties (lists) at the regional level using a state-wide Hare quota (wahlzahl) (valid votes in the state divided by the number of seats in the state). In the second stage, seats are allocated to parties at the state/provincial level using the state-wide Hare quota (any seats won by the party at the regional stage are subtracted from the party's state seats). In the third and final stage, seats are allocated to parties at the federal/national level using the D'Hondt method (any seats won by the party at the regional and state stages are subtracted from the party's federal seats). Only parties that reach the 4% national threshold, or have won a seat at the regional stage, compete for seats at the state and federal stages.

Electors may cast one preferential vote for individual candidates at the regional, state and federal levels. Split-ticket voting (panachage), or voting for more than one candidate at each level, is not permitted and will result in the ballot paper being invalidated. At the regional level, candidates must receive preferential votes amounting to at least 14% of the valid votes cast for their party to over-ride the order of the party list (10% and 7% respectively for the state and federal levels). Prior to April 2013 electors could not cast preferential votes at the federal level and the thresholds candidates needed to over-ride the party list order were higher at the regional level (half the Hare quota or 1/6 of the party votes) and state level (Hare quota).

== Election results ==
=== Summary ===
Election	Communists KPÖ+ / KPÖ			Social Democrats SPÖ			Greens GRÜNE			NEOS NEOS / LiF			People's ÖVP			Freedom FPÖ		
Election	Votes	%	Seats	Votes	%	Seats	Votes	%	Seats	Votes	%	Seats	Votes	%	Seats	Votes	%	Seats
2019	258	0.37%	0	7,921	11.30%	0	7,543	10.76%	0	6,054	8.64%	0	37,321	53.25%	1	9,469	13.51%	0
2017	365	0.49%	0	13,480	18.06%	0	2,439	3.27%	0	4,327	5.80%	0	32,831	43.98%	1	18,291	24.50%	0
2013	282	0.44%	0	11,287	17.68%	0	7,255	11.36%	0	2,211	3.46%	0	25,596	40.09%	1	11,605	18.17%	0
2008	294	0.46%	0	11,027	17.12%	0	5,464	8.49%	0	1,080	1.68%	0	24,055	37.36%	0	10,091	15.67%	0
2006	412	0.62%	0	14,663	21.99%	0	6,106	9.16%	0				34,533	51.79%	1	5,447	8.17%	0
2002	376	0.52%	0	17,226	23.79%	0	6,215	8.58%	0	835	1.15%	0	42,131	58.18%	1	5,632	7.78%	0
1999	154	0.23%	0	14,991	22.71%	0	4,578	6.94%	0	1,879	2.85%	0	27,273	41.32%	1	15,887	24.07%	0
1995	139	0.20%	0	19,012	26.81%	0	3,643	5.14%	0	3,380	4.77%	0	26,815	37.81%	1	16,864	23.78%	0
1994	84	0.13%	0	15,456	23.62%	0	4,473	6.83%	0	2,461	3.76%	0	30,705	46.92%	1	10,909	16.67%	0

=== Detailed ===
==== 2010s ====
===== 2019 =====
Results of the 2019 legislative election held on 29 September 2019:

Party		Votes per district				Total votes	%	Seats
Party		Imst	Land- eck	Reutte	Voting card	Total votes	%	Seats
Austrian People's Party	ÖVP	15,493	13,394	8,390	44	37,321	53.25%	1
Freedom Party of Austria	FPÖ	4,922	2,517	2,019	11	9,469	13.51%	0
Social Democratic Party of Austria	SPÖ	3,256	2,856	1,790	19	7,921	11.30%	0
The Greens – The Green Alternative	GRÜNE	3,481	2,294	1,717	51	7,543	10.76%	0
NEOS – The New Austria and Liberal Forum	NEOS	2,655	2,044	1,322	33	6,054	8.64%	0
JETZT	JETZT	530	334	231	11	1,106	1.58%	0
KPÖ Plus	KPÖ+	119	75	62	2	258	0.37%	0
Der Wandel	WANDL	129	66	42	2	239	0.34%	0
My Vote Counts!	GILT	90	38	42	0	170	0.24%	0
Valid Votes		30,675	23,618	15,615	173	70,081	100.00%	1
Rejected Votes		256	191	138	2	587	0.83%	
Total Polled		30,931	23,809	15,753	175	70,668	70.12%	
Registered Electors		44,604	33,612	22,562		100,778		
Turnout		69.35%	70.83%	69.82%		70.12%		

The following candidates were elected:

- Personal mandates - Elisabeth Pfurtscheller (ÖVP), 9,029 votes.

===== 2017 =====
Results of the 2017 legislative election held on 15 October 2017:

Party		Votes per district				Total votes	%	Seats
Party		Imst	Land- eck	Reutte	Voting card	Total votes	%	Seats
Austrian People's Party	ÖVP	13,496	11,842	7,435	58	32,831	43.98%	1
Freedom Party of Austria	FPÖ	9,018	5,289	3,949	35	18,291	24.50%	0
Social Democratic Party of Austria	SPÖ	5,675	4,823	2,940	42	13,480	18.06%	0
NEOS – The New Austria and Liberal Forum	NEOS	1,833	1,569	897	28	4,327	5.80%	0
The Greens – The Green Alternative	GRÜNE	1,041	727	655	16	2,439	3.27%	0
Peter Pilz List	PILZ	998	611	444	5	2,058	2.76%	0
My Vote Counts!	GILT	267	195	101	0	563	0.75%	0
Communist Party of Austria	KPÖ	152	128	84	1	365	0.49%	0
The Whites	WEIßE	83	59	38	0	180	0.24%	0
Free List Austria	FLÖ	66	35	20	1	122	0.16%	0
Valid Votes		32,629	25,278	16,563	186	74,656	100.00%	1
Rejected Votes		307	219	178	1	705	0.94%	
Total Polled		32,936	25,497	16,741	187	75,361	75.02%	
Registered Electors		44,050	33,670	22,739		100,459		
Turnout		74.77%	75.73%	73.62%		75.02%		

The following candidates were elected:

- Personal mandates - Dominik Schrott (ÖVP), 7,093 votes.

Substitutions:

- Dominik Schrott (ÖVP) resigned on 4 September 2018 and was replaced by Elisabeth Pfurtscheller (ÖVP) on 6 September 2018.

===== 2013 =====
Results of the 2013 legislative election held on 29 September 2013:

Party		Votes per district				Total votes	%	Seats
Party		Imst	Land- eck	Reutte	Voting card	Total votes	%	Seats
Austrian People's Party	ÖVP	9,953	9,715	5,887	41	25,596	40.09%	1
Freedom Party of Austria	FPÖ	5,428	3,668	2,496	13	11,605	18.17%	0
Social Democratic Party of Austria	SPÖ	4,472	4,291	2,513	11	11,287	17.68%	0
The Greens – The Green Alternative	GRÜNE	3,246	2,214	1,754	41	7,255	11.36%	0
Team Stronach	FRANK	1,533	968	780	5	3,286	5.15%	0
NEOS – The New Austria	NEOS	1,064	646	486	15	2,211	3.46%	0
Alliance for the Future of Austria	BZÖ	1,002	492	431	6	1,931	3.02%	0
Pirate Party of Austria	PIRAT	166	134	98	2	400	0.63%	0
Communist Party of Austria	KPÖ	129	95	55	3	282	0.44%	0
Valid Votes		26,993	22,223	14,500	137	63,853	100.00%	1
Rejected Votes		462	291	216	2	971	1.50%	
Total Polled		27,455	22,514	14,716	139	64,824	65.03%	
Registered Electors		43,200	33,652	22,834		99,686		
Turnout		63.55%	66.90%	64.45%		65.03%		

The following candidates were elected:

- Personal mandates - Elisabeth Pfurtscheller (ÖVP), 4,692 votes.

==== 2000s ====
===== 2008 =====
Results of the 2008 legislative election held on 28 September 2008:

Party		Votes per district				Total votes	%	Seats
Party		Imst	Land- eck	Reutte	Voting card	Total votes	%	Seats
Austrian People's Party	ÖVP	9,849	9,105	4,985	116	24,055	37.36%	0
Social Democratic Party of Austria	SPÖ	4,467	4,240	2,280	40	11,027	17.12%	0
Freedom Party of Austria	FPÖ	4,644	3,459	1,939	49	10,091	15.67%	0
Alliance for the Future of Austria	BZÖ	2,611	1,817	1,258	22	5,708	8.86%	0
The Greens – The Green Alternative	GRÜNE	2,357	1,697	1,306	104	5,464	8.49%	0
Fritz Dinkhauser List – Citizens' Forum Tyrol	FRITZ	2,310	1,506	1,465	29	5,310	8.25%	0
Liberal Forum	LiF	501	303	250	26	1,080	1.68%	0
The Christians	DC	352	332	207	4	895	1.39%	0
Independent Citizens' Initiative Save Austria	RETTÖ	184	126	119	2	431	0.67%	0
Communist Party of Austria	KPÖ	125	79	88	2	294	0.46%	0
Left	LINKE	18	11	8	0	37	0.06%	0
Valid Votes		27,418	22,675	13,905	394	64,392	100.00%	0
Rejected Votes		479	365	344	4	1,192	1.82%	
Total Polled		27,897	23,040	14,249	398	65,584	66.98%	
Registered Electors		41,710	33,215	22,989		97,914		
Turnout		66.88%	69.37%	61.98%		66.98%		

===== 2006 =====
Results of the 2006 legislative election held on 1 October 2006:

Party		Votes per district				Total votes	%	Seats
Party		Imst	Land- eck	Reutte	Voting card	Total votes	%	Seats
Austrian People's Party	ÖVP	13,314	12,219	7,802	1,198	34,533	51.79%	1
Social Democratic Party of Austria	SPÖ	5,857	5,281	3,133	392	14,663	21.99%	0
The Greens – The Green Alternative	GRÜNE	2,570	1,759	1,298	479	6,106	9.16%	0
Freedom Party of Austria	FPÖ	2,595	1,610	1,105	137	5,447	8.17%	0
Hans-Peter Martin's List	MATIN	1,226	880	768	67	2,941	4.41%	0
Alliance for the Future of Austria	BZÖ	949	516	465	46	1,976	2.96%	0
EU Withdrawal – Neutral Free Austria	NFÖ	263	169	148	18	598	0.90%	0
Communist Party of Austria	KPÖ	176	108	116	12	412	0.62%	0
Valid Votes		26,950	22,542	14,835	2,349	66,676	100.00%	1
Rejected Votes		389	266	203	16	874	1.29%	
Total Polled		27,339	22,808	15,038	2,365	67,550	72.45%	
Registered Electors		39,399	31,689	22,153		93,241		
Turnout		69.39%	71.97%	67.88%		72.45%		

The following candidates were elected:

- Personal mandates - Günther Platter (ÖVP), 16,759 votes.

Substitutions:

- Günther Platter (ÖVP) resigned on 11 January 2007 and was replaced by Astrid Stadler (ÖVP) on 16 January 2007.

===== 2002 =====
Results of the 2002 legislative election held on 24 November 2002:

Party		Votes per district				Total votes	%	Seats
Party		Imst	Land- eck	Reutte	Voting card	Total votes	%	Seats
Austrian People's Party	ÖVP	16,914	14,392	9,524	1,301	42,131	58.18%	1
Social Democratic Party of Austria	SPÖ	6,758	6,433	3,590	445	17,226	23.79%	0
The Greens – The Green Alternative	GRÜNE	2,340	1,902	1,387	586	6,215	8.58%	0
Freedom Party of Austria	FPÖ	2,547	1,474	1,461	150	5,632	7.78%	0
Liberal Forum	LiF	341	251	206	37	835	1.15%	0
Communist Party of Austria	KPÖ	130	126	110	10	376	0.52%	0
Valid Votes		29,030	24,578	16,278	2,529	72,415	100.00%	1
Rejected Votes		469	406	256	16	1,147	1.56%	
Total Polled		29,499	24,984	16,534	2,545	73,562	83.13%	
Registered Electors		36,947	30,213	21,329		88,489		
Turnout		79.84%	82.69%	77.52%		83.13%		

The following candidates were elected:

- Personal mandates - Astrid Stadler (ÖVP), 10,405 votes.

==== 1990s ====
===== 1999 =====
Results of the 1999 legislative election held on 3 October 1999:

Party		Votes per district				Total votes	%	Seats
Party		Imst	Land- eck	Reutte	Voting card	Total votes	%	Seats
Austrian People's Party	ÖVP	10,260	10,116	6,069	828	27,273	41.32%	1
Freedom Party of Austria	FPÖ	6,821	4,542	4,144	380	15,887	24.07%	0
Social Democratic Party of Austria	SPÖ	5,535	5,788	3,313	355	14,991	22.71%	0
The Greens – The Green Alternative	GRÜNE	1,765	1,409	1,098	306	4,578	6.94%	0
Liberal Forum	LiF	725	523	430	201	1,879	2.85%	0
The Independents	DU	306	127	170	21	624	0.95%	0
Christian Voters Community	CWG	128	105	59	24	316	0.48%	0
No to NATO and EU – Neutral Austria Citizens' Initiative	NEIN	122	77	93	7	299	0.45%	0
Communist Party of Austria	KPÖ	60	53	31	10	154	0.23%	0
Valid Votes		25,722	22,740	15,407	2,132	66,001	100.00%	1
Rejected Votes		454	469	276	13	1,212	1.80%	
Total Polled		26,176	23,209	15,683	2,145	67,213	77.85%	
Registered Electors		35,715	29,602	21,018		86,335		
Turnout		73.29%	78.40%	74.62%		77.85%		

The following candidates were elected:

- Personal mandates - Günther Platter (ÖVP), 10,807 votes.

Substitutions:

- Günther Platter (ÖVP) resigned on 14 November 2000 and was replaced by Astrid Stadler (ÖVP) on 16 November 2000.

===== 1995 =====
Results of the 1995 legislative election held on 17 December 1995:

Party		Votes per district				Total votes	%	Seats
Party		Imst	Land- eck	Reutte	Voting card	Total votes	%	Seats
Austrian People's Party	ÖVP	10,517	9,907	5,801	572	26,797	37.77%	1
Social Democratic Party of Austria	SPÖ	7,233	7,267	4,199	368	19,067	26.87%	0
Freedom Party of Austria	FPÖ	6,982	4,792	4,790	259	16,823	23.71%	0
The Greens – The Green Alternative	GRÜNE	1,413	1,076	873	292	3,654	5.15%	0
Liberal Forum	LiF	1,416	904	850	238	3,408	4.80%	0
No – Civic Action Group; Against the Sale of Austria	NEIN	470	298	269	27	1,064	1.50%	0
Communist Party of Austria	KPÖ	53	52	31	3	139	0.20%	0
Valid Votes		28,084	24,296	16,813	1,759	70,952	100.00%	1
Rejected Votes		1,032	781	481	14	2,308	3.15%	
Total Polled		29,116	25,077	17,294	1,773	73,260	87.95%	
Registered Electors		34,004	28,718	20,579		83,301		
Turnout		85.63%	87.32%	84.04%		87.95%		

The following candidates were elected:

- Personal mandates - Günther Platter (ÖVP), 5,527 votes.

On 28 June 1996 the Constitutional Court annulled the results in the municipality of Reutte. Results of the re-run held on 13 October 1996:

Party		Votes per district				Total votes	%	Seats
Party		Imst	Land- eck	Reutte	Voting card	Total votes	%	Seats
Austrian People's Party	ÖVP	10,517	9,907	5,806	585	26,815	37.81%	1
Social Democratic Party of Austria	SPÖ	7,233	7,267	4,142	370	19,012	26.81%	0
Freedom Party of Austria	FPÖ	6,982	4,792	4,825	265	16,864	23.78%	0
The Greens – The Green Alternative	GRÜNE	1,413	1,076	859	295	3,643	5.14%	0
Liberal Forum	LiF	1,416	904	820	240	3,380	4.77%	0
No – Civic Action Group; Against the Sale of Austria	NEIN	470	298	267	27	1,062	1.50%	0
Communist Party of Austria	KPÖ	53	52	31	3	139	0.20%	0
Valid Votes		28,084	24,296	16,750	1,785	70,915	100.00%	1
Rejected Votes		1,032	781	477	16	2,306	3.15%	
Total Polled		29,116	25,077	17,227	1,801	73,221	87.90%	
Registered Electors		34,004	28,718	20,579		83,301		
Turnout		85.63%	87.32%	83.71%		87.90%		

The following candidates were elected:

- Personal mandates - Günther Platter (ÖVP), 5,510 votes.

===== 1994 =====
Results of the 1994 legislative election held on 9 October 1994:

Party		Votes per district				Total votes	%	Seats
Party		Imst	Land- eck	Reutte	Voting card	Total votes	%	Seats
Austrian People's Party	ÖVP	11,791	11,296	6,640	978	30,705	46.92%	1
Social Democratic Party of Austria	SPÖ	5,721	6,140	3,188	407	15,456	23.62%	0
Freedom Party of Austria	FPÖ	4,629	2,925	3,044	311	10,909	16.67%	0
The Greens – The Green Alternative	GRÜNE	1,761	1,267	1,081	364	4,473	6.83%	0
Liberal Forum	LiF	1,053	654	546	208	2,461	3.76%	0
Christian Voters Community	CWG	266	232	70	32	600	0.92%	0
No – Civic Action Group; Against the Sale of Austria	NEIN	162	164	206	26	558	0.85%	0
Natural Law Party	ÖNP	61	31	27	7	126	0.19%	0
Communist Party of Austria	KPÖ	26	35	16	7	84	0.13%	0
United Greens Austria – List Adi Pinter	VGÖ	35	24	9	3	71	0.11%	0
Valid Votes		25,505	22,768	14,827	2,343	65,443	100.00%	1
Rejected Votes		967	622	357	37	1,983	2.94%	
Total Polled		26,472	23,390	15,184	2,380	67,426	81.44%	
Registered Electors		33,634	28,632	20,530		82,796		
Turnout		78.71%	81.69%	73.96%		81.44%		

The following candidates were elected:

- Personal mandates - Günther Platter (ÖVP), 9,324 votes.
