= Johannes Schmuckenschlager =

Austrian politician (born 1978)

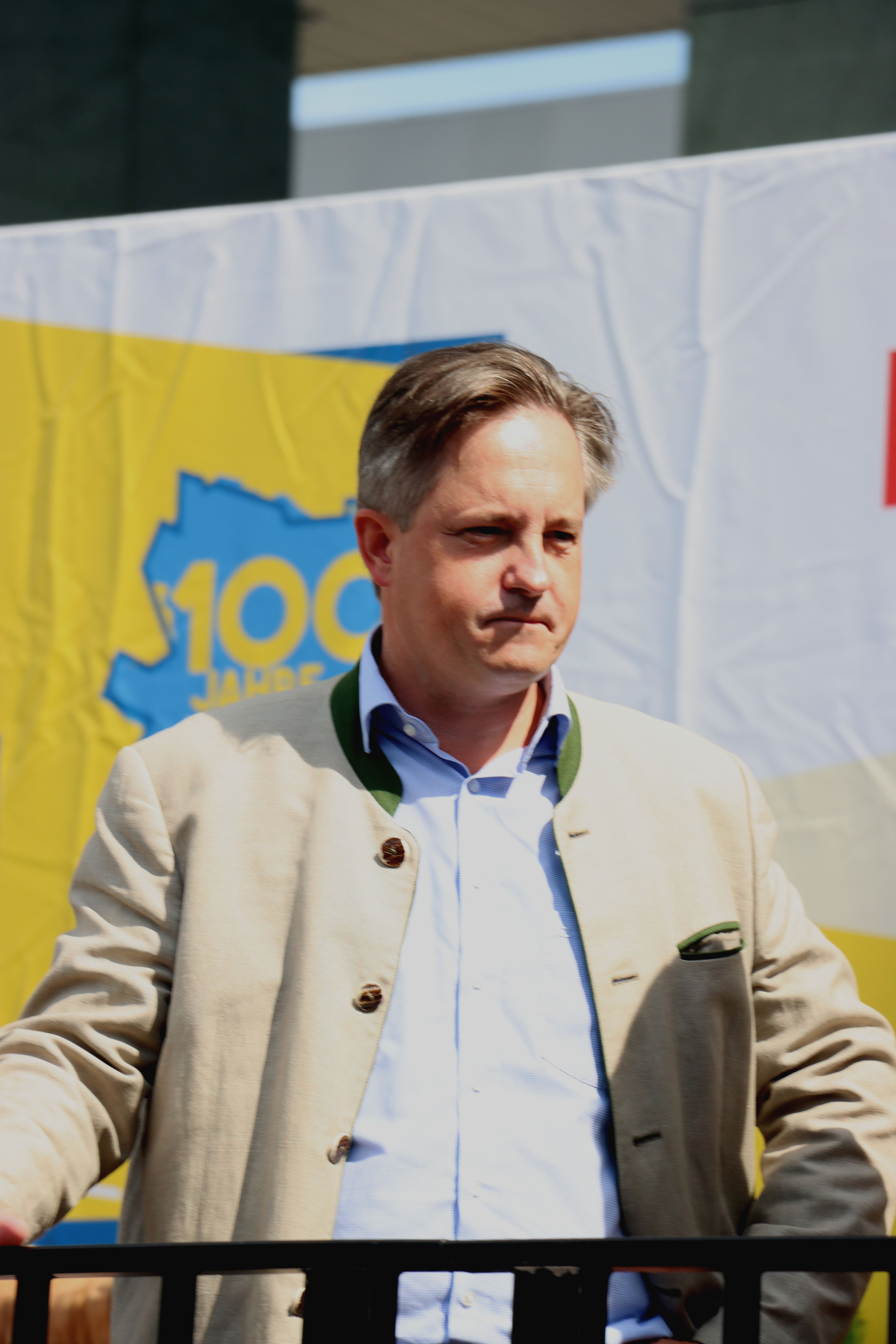
- Schmuckenschlager in 2022

Member of the National Council
- Incumbent
- Assumed office 3 December 2008
- Preceded by: Michael Spindelegger
- Constituency: Wien Umgebung (2008–2017); Lower Austria (2017–present)

Personal details
- Born: 20 September 1978 (age 47)
- Party: People's Party

Johannes Schmuckenschlager (born 20 September 1978) is an Austrian politician of the People's Party serving as a member of the National Council since 2008. Since 2018, he has served as president of the Landwirtschaftskammer in Lower Austria.
