= Jiří Šimánek =

Jiří Šimánek may refer to:

- Jiří Šimánek (ice hockey)
- Jiří Šimánek (rower)
