= Alois Kainz =

Austrian politician (born 1964)

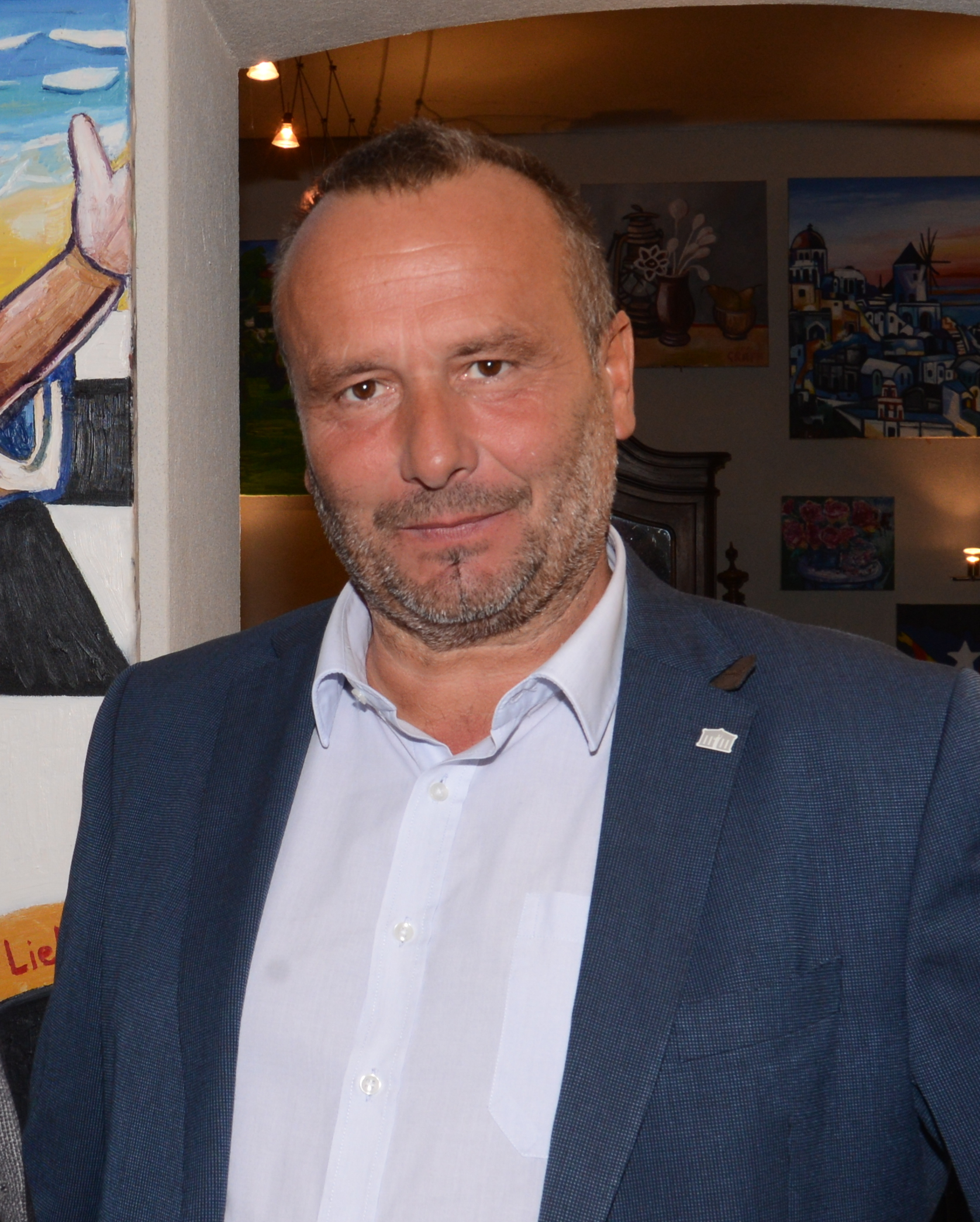
- Kainz in 2019

Member of the National Council
- Incumbent
- Assumed office 1 July 2019
- Preceded by: Walter Rosenkranz
- Constituency: Lower Austria (2019–2024); Waldviertel (2024–present)
- In office 20 December 2017 – 23 May 2019
- Preceded by: Herbert Kickl
- Succeeded by: Herbert Kickl
- Constituency: Lower Austria

Personal details
- Born: 22 May 1964 (age 61)
- Party: Freedom Party

Alois Kainz (born 22 May 1964) is an Austrian politician of the Freedom Party. He has been a member of the National Council since 2019, having previously served from 2017 to 2019. He has been a municipal councillor of Allentsteig since 2010.
