= Barbara Wolfgang-Krenn =

Austrian entrepreneur and politician (1969–2019)

Member of the National Council
- In office 9 November 2017 - 3 April 2019
- Succeeded by: Karl Schmidhofer

Mayor of Pürgg-Trautenfels
- In office 2007-2014

Personal details
- Born: 19 December 1969 Bad Aussee, Austria
- Died: April 2019 (aged 49) Vienna, Austria
- Party: Austrian People's Party

Barbara Wolfgang-Krenn, also known as Barbara Krenn (born 19 December 1969 in Bad Aussee; died 3 April 2019 in Vienna), was an Austrian entrepreneur and politician of the Austrian People's Party (ÖVP). On 9 November 2017, she was sworn in as a member of the Austrian National Council.

== Life ==
Among other things, Krenn worked as a management assistant at the Hotel Yachtclub Timmendorfer Strand. Her parents ran the Krenn Inn in Pürgg, which she ran from 1988 to 2016 as an innkeeper. As an entrepreneur, she was promoted to the position of the head of the Styrian innkeeper's department in the Styrian Chamber of Commerce. At the same time, she was active in the community, where she joined the local council in 1995, took over the function of head of tourism in 1998, and held the office of mayor of Pürgg-Trautenfels from 2007 to 2014. She was a candidate for the Austrian People's Party (ÖVP) in the 2013 legislative elections.

After an unsuccessful surgery in 2014, she became paraplegic and thus resigned from all functions, selling the inn to Dietrich Mateschitz.

In November 2018 she succeeded Dorothea Schittenhelm as the women's spokeswoman of the ÖVP parliamentary group.

Barbara Wolfgang-Krenn died of cancer in April 2019. Her seat on the National Council went to Karl Schmidhofer, and Juliane Bogner-Strauß succeeded her as women's spokeswoman.
