= Christian Höbart =

Austrian politician (born 1975)

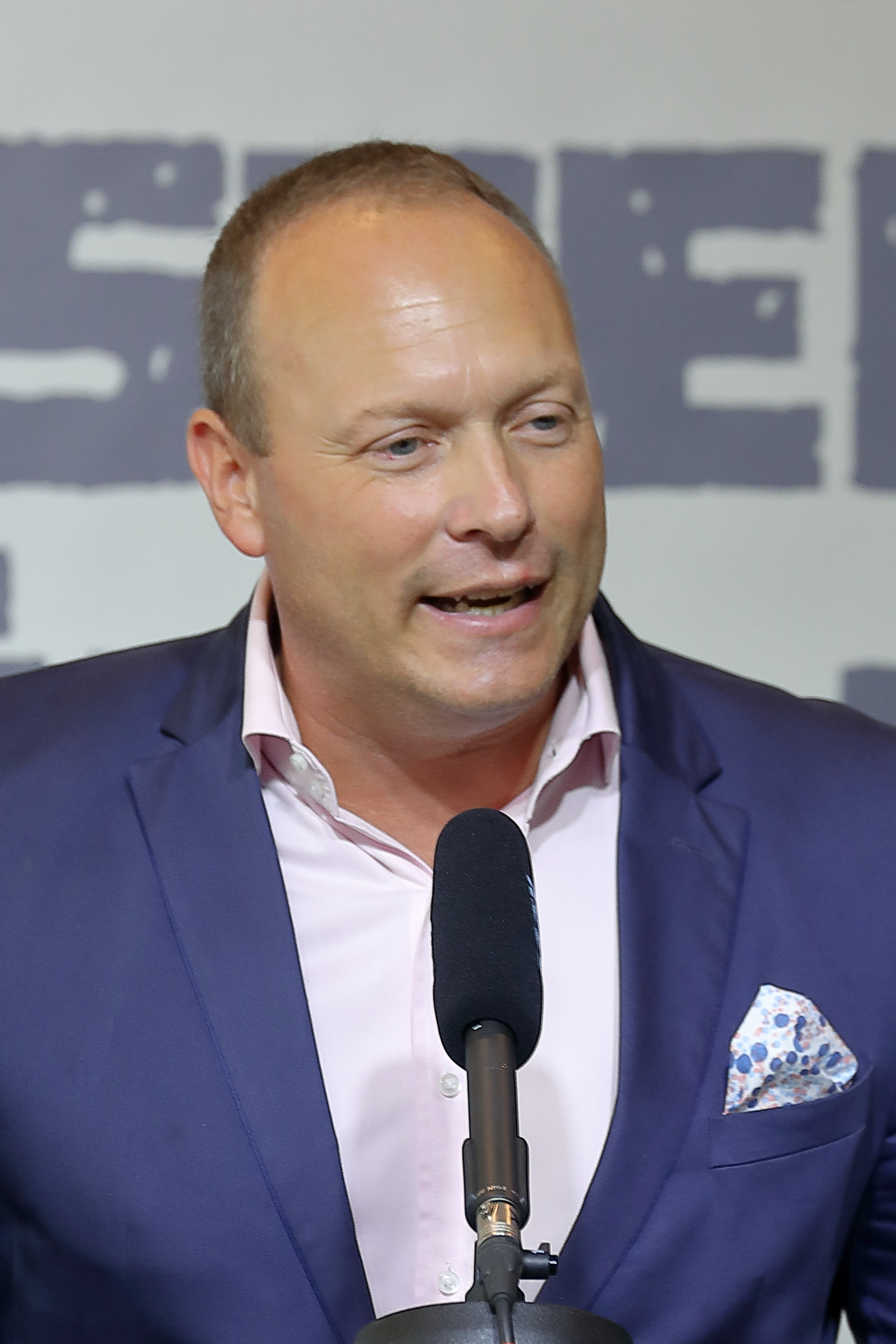
- Höbart in 2020

Member of the National Council
- Incumbent
- Assumed office 28 October 2008
- Constituency: 3 Niederösterreich

Personal details
- Born: 9 June 1975 (age 50)
- Party: Freedom Party of Austria

Christian Höbart (born 9 June 1975) is an Austrian politician who has been a Member of the National Council for the Freedom Party of Austria (FPÖ) since 2008.
