= Wendelin Mölzer =

Austrian politician (born 1980)

Member of the National Council
- Incumbent
- Assumed office 29 October 2013
- Constituency: 2 Kärnten

Personal details
- Born: 7 March 1980 (age 46)
- Party: Freedom Party of Austria

Wendelin Mölzer (born 7 March 1980) is an Austrian politician. He has been a Member of the National Council for the Freedom Party of Austria (FPÖ) since 2013.
