= Peter Schmiedlechner =

Austrian politician (born 1982)

Member of the National Council
- Incumbent
- Assumed office 9 November 2017
- Constituency: Lower Austria

Personal details
- Born: 16 September 1982 (age 43)
- Party: Freedom Party

Peter Schmiedlechner (born 16 September 1982) is an Austrian politician of the Freedom Party. Since 2017, he has been a member of the National Council. He was the leader of the Freedom Party in Wiener Neustadt from 2009 to 2017, and became acting district chairman of Wiener Neustadt in 2018, upon the resignation of Udo Landbauer.
