= Werner Herbert =

Austrian politician (born 1963)

Member of the Federal Council

Personal details
- Born: 29 August 1963 (age 62)
- Party: Freedom Party of Austria

Werner Herbert (born 29 August 1963) is an Austrian politician who is currently a Member of the Federal Council for the Freedom Party of Austria (FPÖ).
