= Andrea Michaela Schartel =

Austrian politician (born 1964)

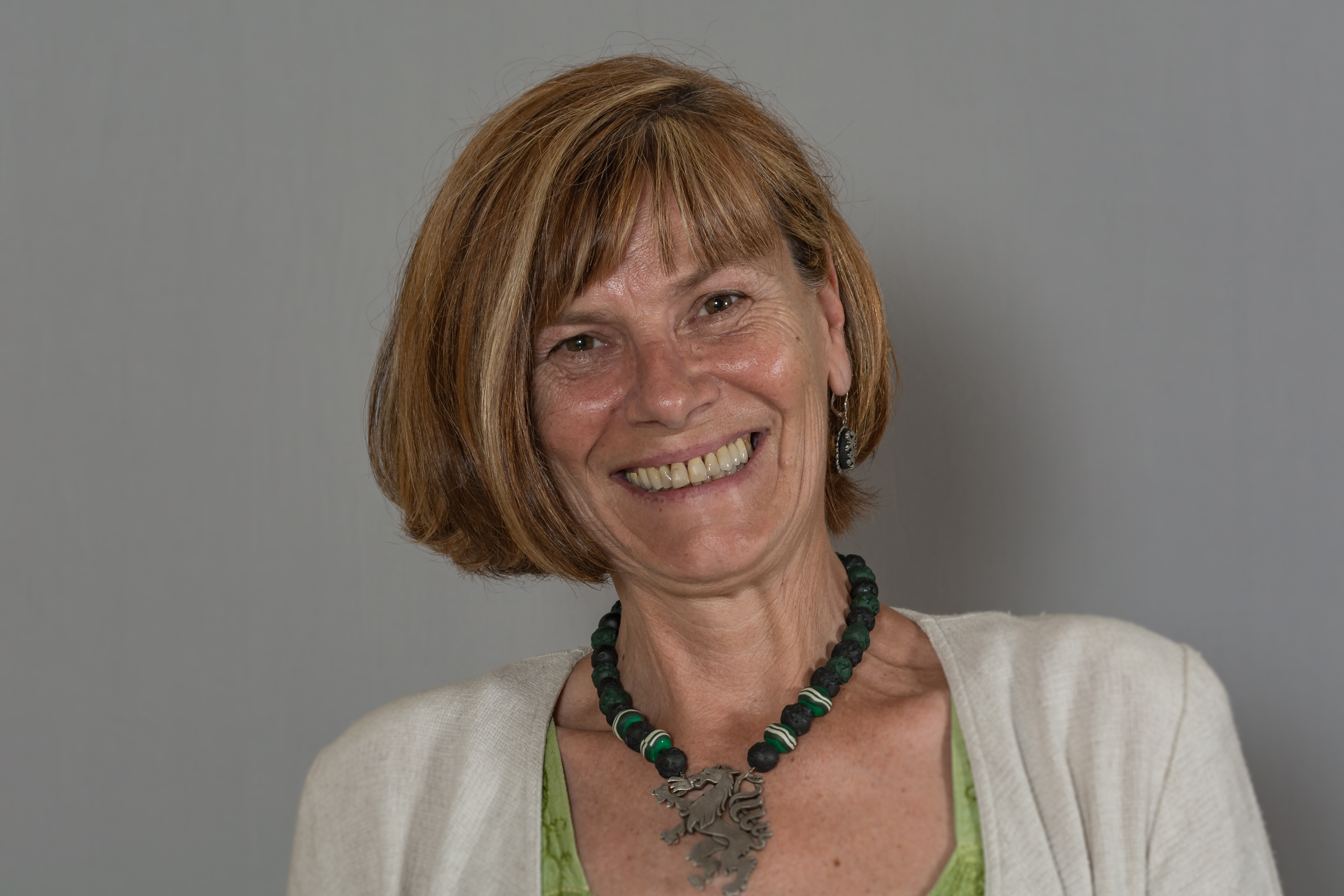
- Schartel in 2016

Member of the National Council
- Incumbent
- Assumed office 24 October 2024
- Constituency: Federal list
- In office 29 January 2018 – 22 October 2019
- Preceded by: Heinz-Christian Strache
- Constituency: Federal list

Member of the Federal Council
- In office 17 December 2019 – 23 October 2024
- Nominated by: Landtag Styria

Personal details
- Born: 30 June 1964 (age 61)
- Party: Freedom Party

Andrea Michaela Schartel (born 30 June 1964) is an Austrian politician of the Freedom Party. She has been a member of the National Council since 2024, having previously served from 2018 to 2019. From 2019 to 2024, she was a member of the Federal Council.
