= Maximilian Krauss (politician) =

Austrian politician (born 1993)

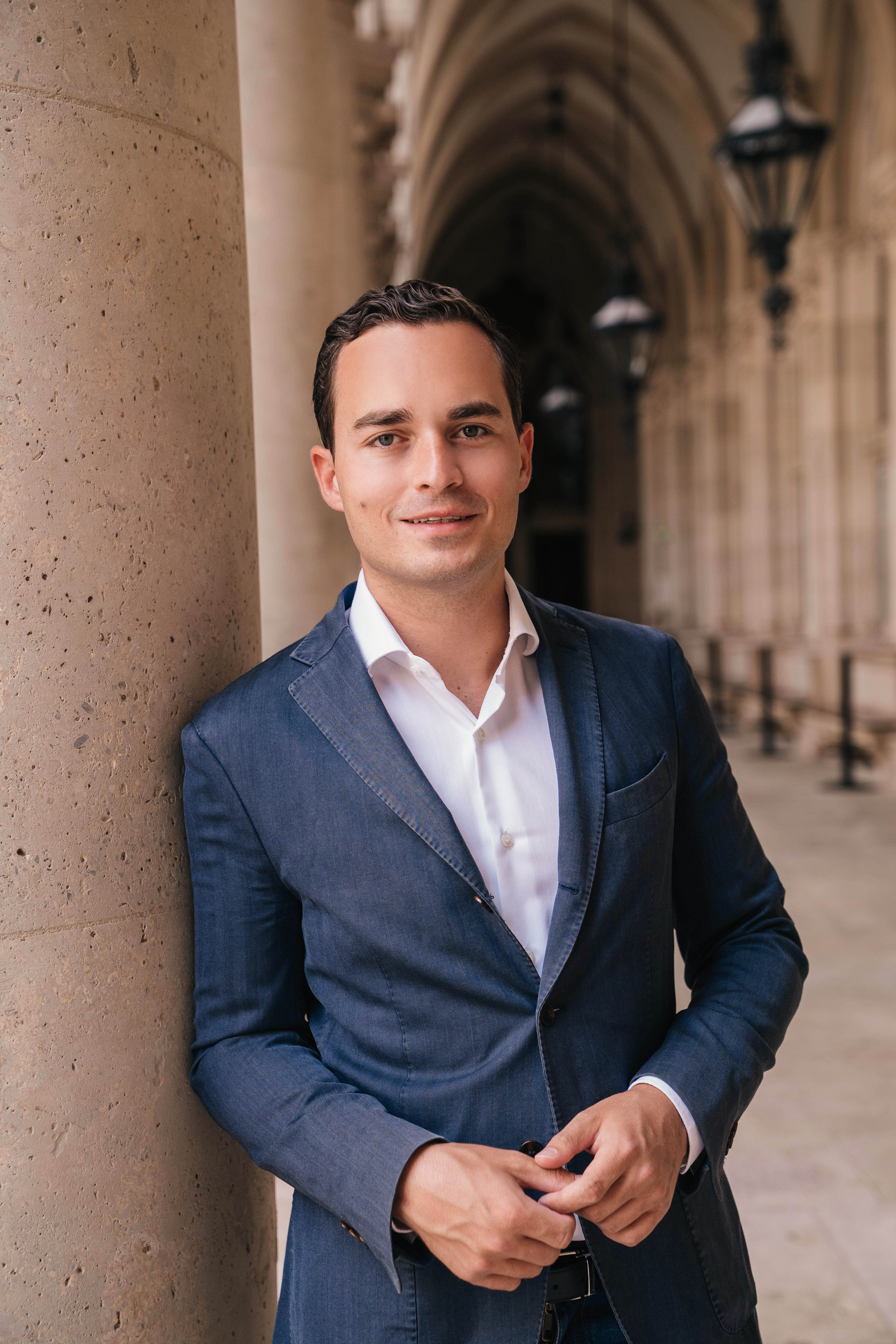
- Krauss in 2022

Member of the National Council
- In office 9 November 2017 – 18 December 2017
- Succeeded by: Petra Steger

Personal details
- Born: 8 February 1993 (age 33)
- Party: Freedom Party

Maximilian Krauss (born 8 February 1993) is an Austrian politician. He has been a member of the Municipal Council and Landtag of Vienna since 2020, having previously served from 2015 to 2017. He has served as group leader of the Freedom Party since 2020. From November to December 2017, he was a member of the National Council.
