= Werner Neubauer =

Austrian politician (born 1956)

Member of the National Council
- Incumbent
- Assumed office 30 October 2006
- Constituency: B Bundeswahlvorschlag

Personal details
- Born: 29 October 1956 (age 69)
- Party: Freedom Party of Austria

Werner Neubauer (born 29 October 1956) is an Austrian politician who has been a Member of the National Council for the Freedom Party of Austria (FPÖ) since 2006.

== Honours ==
- Order of the Rising Sun, Gold Rays with Ribbon, 2020
