= Juliane Bogner-Strauß =

Austrian molecular biologist, biochemist and politician

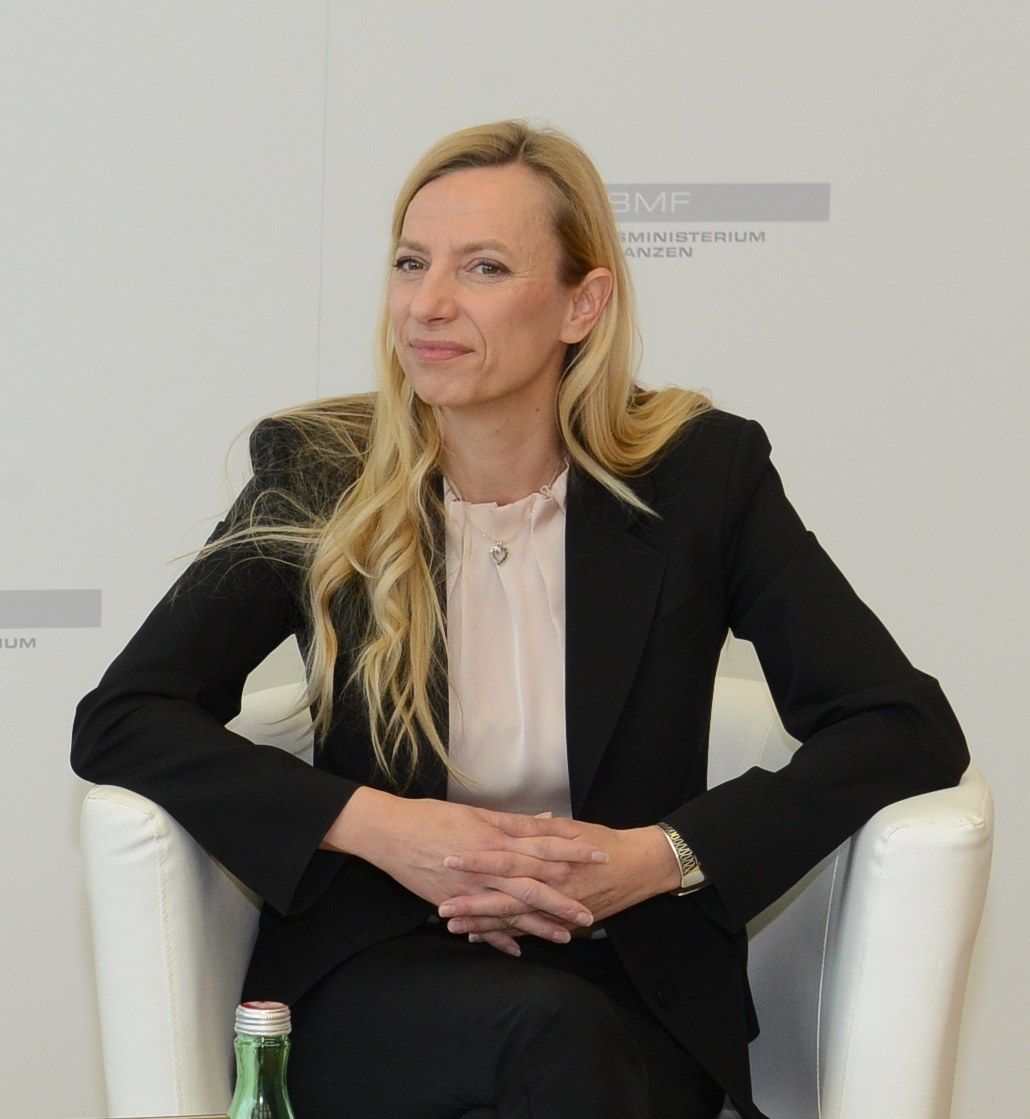

Minister of the Civil Service and Sport
- In office 22 May 2019 – 3 June 2019
- Chancellor: Sebastian Kurz
- Preceded by: Heinz-Christian Strache
- Succeeded by: Eduard Müller

Chancellery minister for Women, Families and Youth
- Incumbent
- Assumed office 18 December 2017
- Chancellor: Sebastian Kurz

Personal details
- Born: 3 November 1971 (age 54) Wagna, Styria, Austria
- Party: People's Party

Juliane Bogner-Strauß, (born 3 November 1971) is an Austrian molecular biologist, biochemist, and politician in the Austrian People's Party (ÖVP). Since October 2013 she is Associate Professor at the Institute of Biochemistry of Graz University of Technology. From 18 December 2017 she was Federal Minister for Families and Youth of the Republic of Austria, since 8 January 2018 she is Federal Minister for Women, Families and Youth in the Federal Chancellery. Since 9 July 2018, she is the Federal Minister for Sustainability and Tourism.

== Life ==
From 1992 she studied chemistry at the University of Graz, graduating in 1999 with a master's degree. This was followed by a doctoral degree at the Institute of Molecular Biosciences at the University of Graz, where she earned her doctorate in 2002 under Rudolf Zechner and subsequently worked as a university assistant until 2005. In 2005 she moved to Graz University of Technology as assistant professor at the Institute for Genomics and Bioinformatics. In 2008 she qualified as a professor in the field of genomics and molecular biology. In 2010 she became associate professor and deputy director of the institute. In October 2013 she became Associate Professor and Deputy Director of the Institute of Biochemistry. Since June 2018 she has been a supporter of the Strong Women, Strong hearts initiative, founded in 2017, for education about cardiovascular diseases.

== Politics ==
In the 2017 Austrian legislative election, she ran as a newcomer for the Styrian People's Party on the third list of the state list. From 9 November 2017 to 22 January 2018, she was a member of the Austrian National Council. Since 18 December 2017, she has been a member of the Federal Government for short as Minister for Women, Family and Youth. In the National Council she followed Josef Smolle on 24 January 2018. Josef Smolle. From 8 July 2018, Bogner-Strauß represented the Federal Minister for Sustainability and Tourism, Elisabeth Köstinger, when she went on parental leave for six weeks. Since October 2017, she has been a member of the Styrian VP-Employee Alliance and, since November 2017, a member of the Styrian VP Women.

From 22 May to 3 June 2019, she was also entrusted with the management of the Federal Ministry of Public Service and Sport. In June 2019 she resumed her mandate on the National Council, Josef Smolle resigned from the National Council. At the beginning of July 2019, she succeeded Barbara Wolfgang-Krenn, who died in April 2019, as women's spokesperson in the ÖVP parliamentary club.

In the 2019 National Council election, she ran as the ÖVP's top candidate in Styria and in sixth place on the ÖVP federal list. As part of the coalition negotiations to form a government in 2019, she is negotiating in the main group on social security, new justice and combating poverty. On 17 December 2019, she was elected regional councilor of the Schützenhöfer II state government in Styria, where she is responsible for the areas of healthcare and education. Josef Smolle again took over her National Council mandate after Martina Kaufmann moved from the state list to the Graz basic mandate. Elisabeth Pfurtscheller succeeded her as women's representative.

In January 2023, the FPÖ submitted a motion of no confidence in the state parliament against State Health Councilor Bogner-Strauß, which was rejected. FPÖ MP Marco Triller accused her of a "failed health policy". On 9 October 2023, her resignation as state councilor was announced; Karlheinz Kornhäusl was elected and sworn in as her successor on 17 October 2023. Bogner-Strauß returned to the National Council on 19 October 2023 in place of Karl Schmidhofer.
