= Stefan Schnöll =

Austrian politician (born 1988)

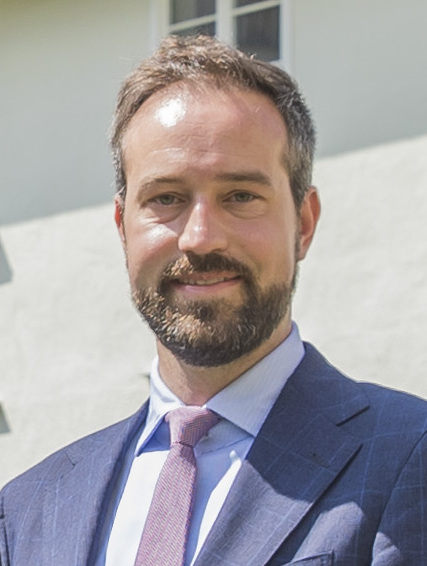

Deputy Governor of Salzburg
- Incumbent
- Assumed office 2013

Personal details
- Born: 13 March 1988 (age 37); Salzburg, Salzburg, Austria
- Political party: People's Party

Stefan Schnöll (born 13 March 1988) is an Austrian politician who served as a member of the National Council from November 2017 to June 2018. He is chairman of the Young People's Party. Since June 2018 he serves as state councilor for trafficking, infrastructure and sports in Salzburg.

From 2013 to April 2017 he was a vice president of the Youth of the European People's Party. He served as secretary general of the Young People's Party under chairman Sebastian Kurz before being nominated by him as successor in May 2017.
