= Carmen Schimanek =

Austrian politician

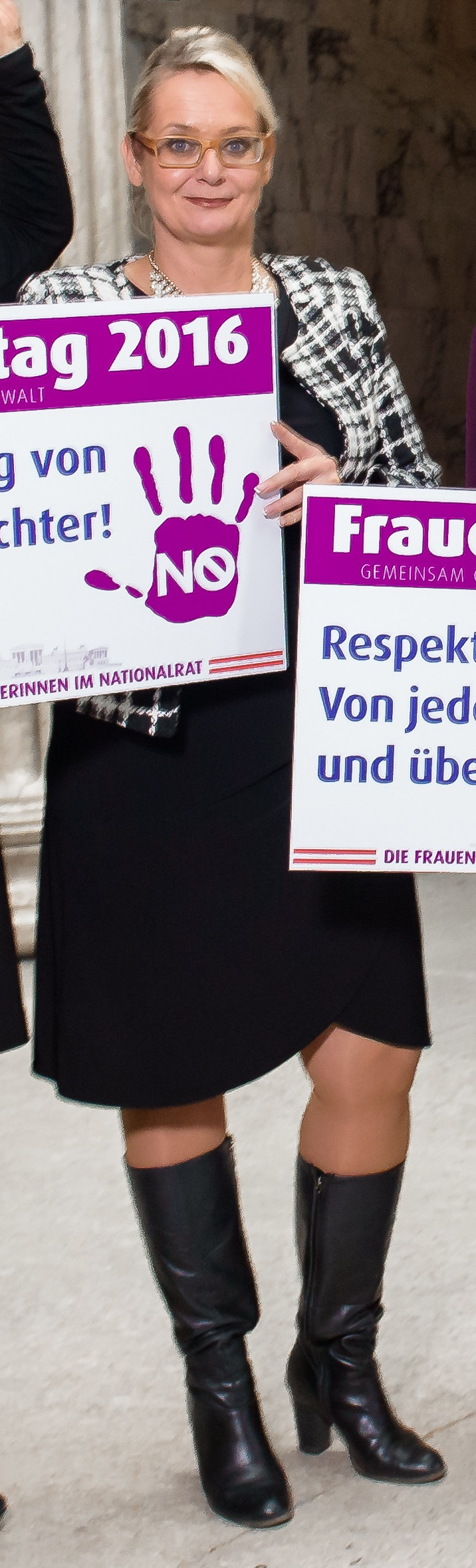

Member of the National Council
- Incumbent
- Assumed office 28 October 2008
- Constituency: B Bundeswahlvorschlag

Personal details
- Born: 25 June 1965 (age 60)
- Party: Freedom Party of Austria

Carmen Schimanek (born 25 June 1965) is an Austrian accountant and politician who has been a Member of the National Council for the Freedom Party of Austria (FPÖ) since 2008.
