= Voter invitation card =

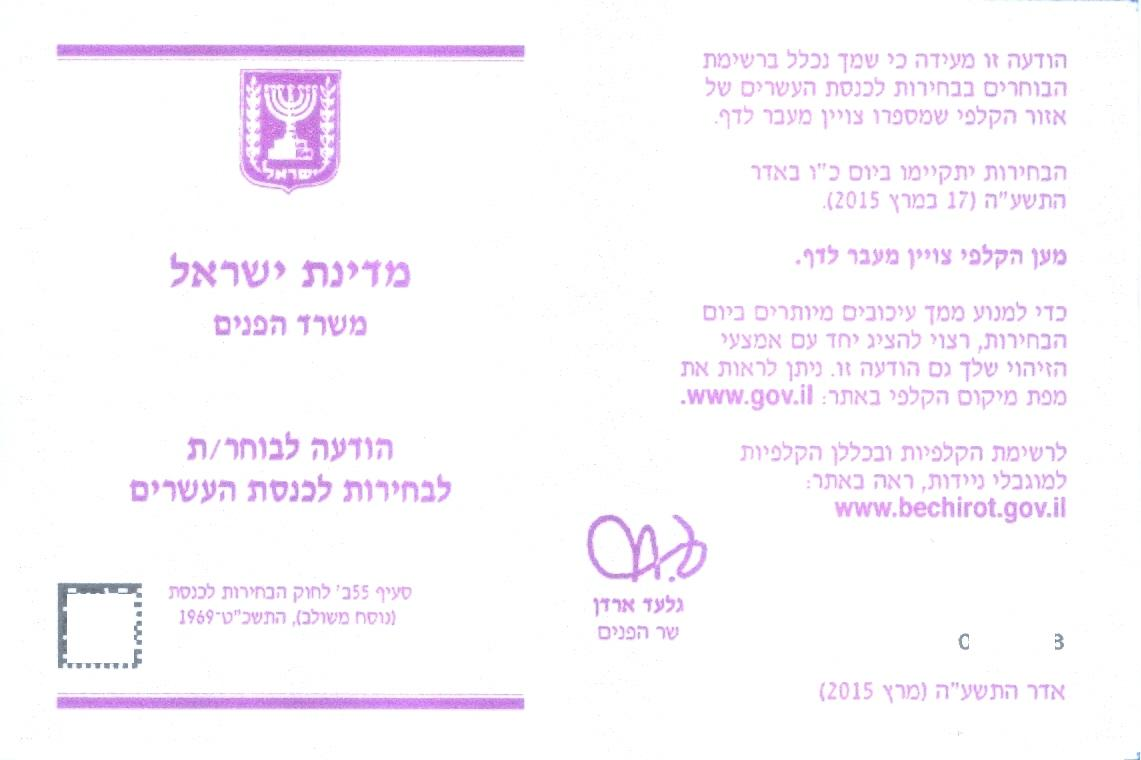
Voter invitation card for the 2015 Israeli legislative election

A voter invitation card, voter notification card, poll card, or notice of election card, is an informational leaflet, usually of the size of a postcard, which requests voters to attend the elections and which generally contains information regarding elections, place and time of voting, and contact details of the electoral commission.

== By country ==
=== Belgium ===
Each municipal administration automatically sends a voter invitation card (Dutch: oproepingsbrief, French: convocation) to all eligible voters. The voter needs to bring their ID card as well as the voter invitation card to the voting location to be able to cast a ballot. If not received or lost, the voter can request a duplicate card up until election day.

=== France ===
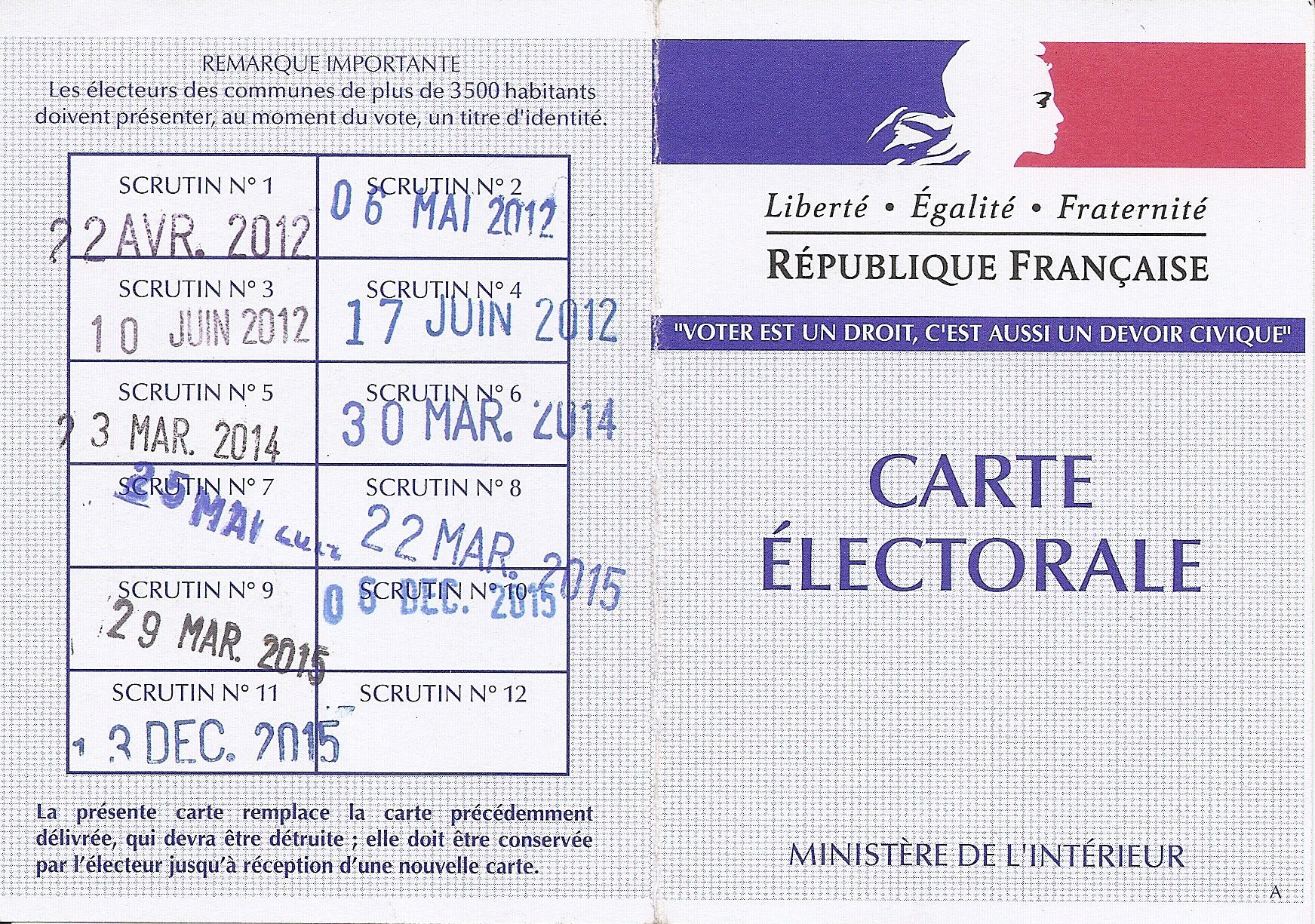
A French voter invitation card

In France the voter invitation card also serves as a certificate that the voter is registered on the Electoral roll, and is intended to be kept and used for multiple election cycles.

Until 1993 French voter invitation cards were titled as "CARTE D'ÉLECTEUR". Starting with the 1994 European Parliament election in France, voter invitation cards are titled using the gender-neutral "CARTE ÉLECTORALE". This was done in response to the demands of women's movements, which requested titling voter invitation cards separately by the invitee's gender ("CARTE D'ÉLECTEUR" for men and "CARTE D'ÉLECTRICE" for women), despite a recommendation by the Académie française to continue titling all voter invitation cards as "CARTE D'ÉLECTEUR".

=== USSR ===
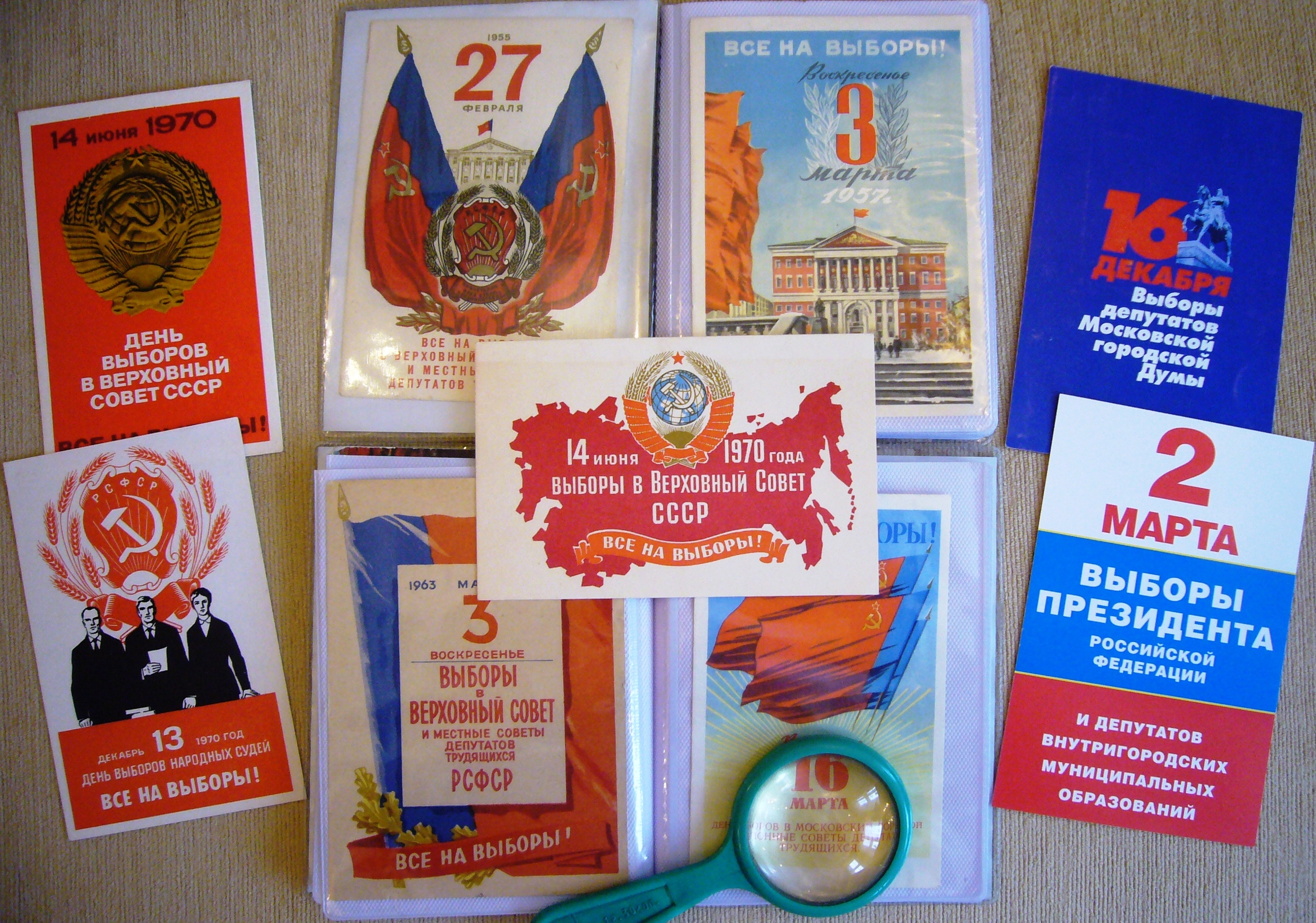
Voter invitation cards of the USSR and Russia from various years (obverse)

The USSR voter cards are often called "All come to vote" cards (Russian: "открытки «Все на выборы»") because during the Soviet Union period they inevitably carried an inscription, a slogan "All come to vote". One side of such voter invitation cards usually was artistically illustrated, while the other (reverse) side contained information. The text on such voter cards during the Soviet time carried invariable components: the words "Dear comrade _____________. Please be reminded that on Sunday …"; and an appeal to come and vote for candidates of the electoral bloc of communists and independents. Voter invitation cards were sent on behalf of "trustee persons of the constituency election campaign conference of workers' representatives", campaign team, and were always characterized by electoral campaign propaganda, requesting to vote for the candidates of the electoral bloc of communists and independents.

=== Russian Federation ===
In Russia voter invitation cards are no longer electoral campaign propaganda. Their function is only to inform of elections, time of voting and location of the polling station, and more often than not contain only text without any images.

=== United Kingdom ===
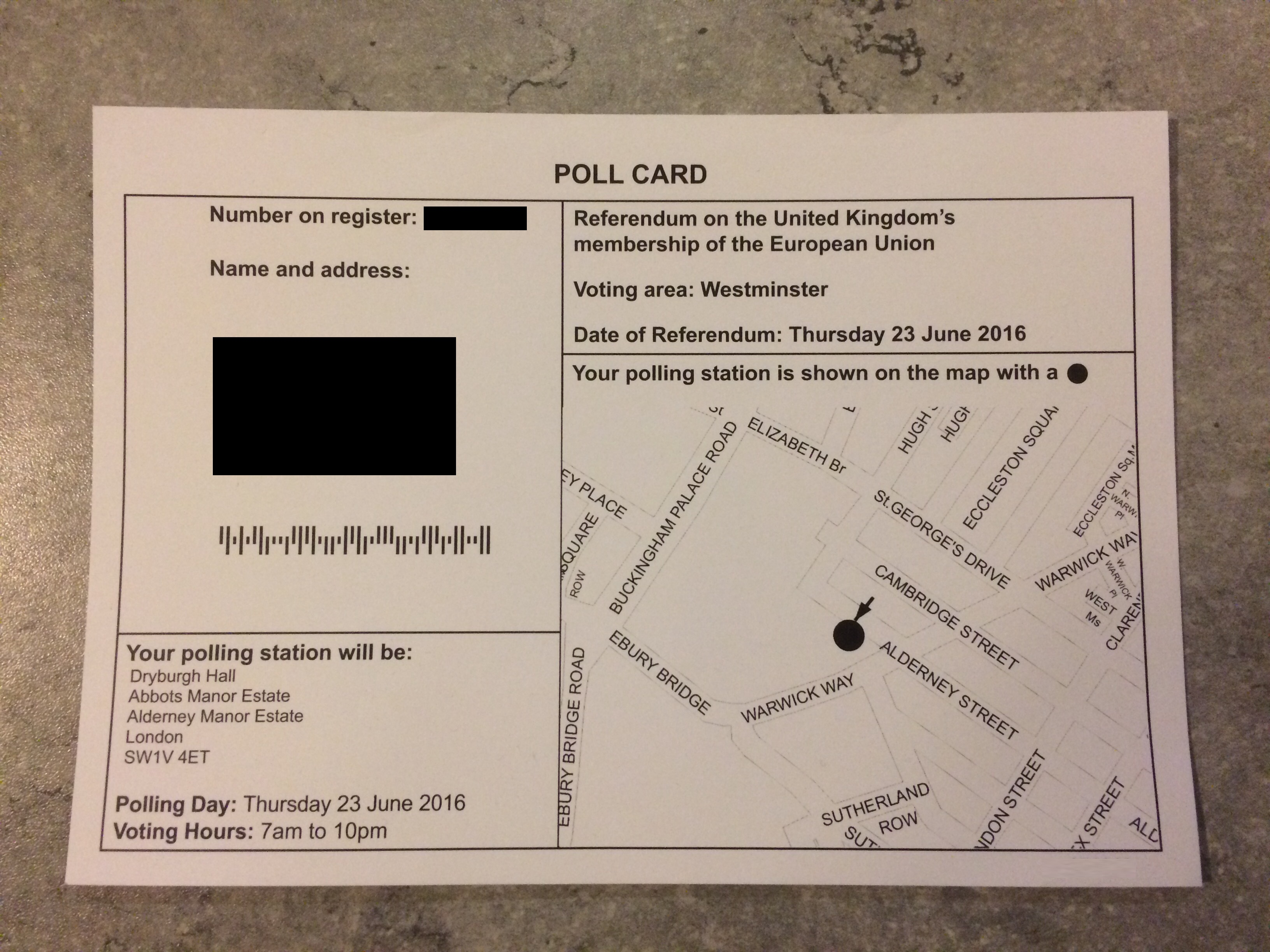
A Westminster area poll card from the 2016 United Kingdom European Union membership referendum

A poll card is a document which is sent to all registered voters by the returning officer shortly before an election in the United Kingdom. The poll card gives information about the election, such as the date of the election, the location and opening times of the voter's polling station, and the name, address and electoral number of the voter.

It is not necessary to take the card to the polling station to vote.

Poll cards were introduced as part of the Representation of the People Act 1948, and the first general election in which they were used was that of 1950.

=== Tunisia ===
In Tunisia, the Ministry of the Interior organized and managed the votes from 1959 until 2009 by presenting the voter's card and the national identity card. But following the Tunisian Revolution in 2011, the Independent High Authority for Elections is now responsible for the management of elections and referendums, their organization and their supervision in their different phases. From this date on, the voter card is no longer used.

Tunisian voter's card after independence

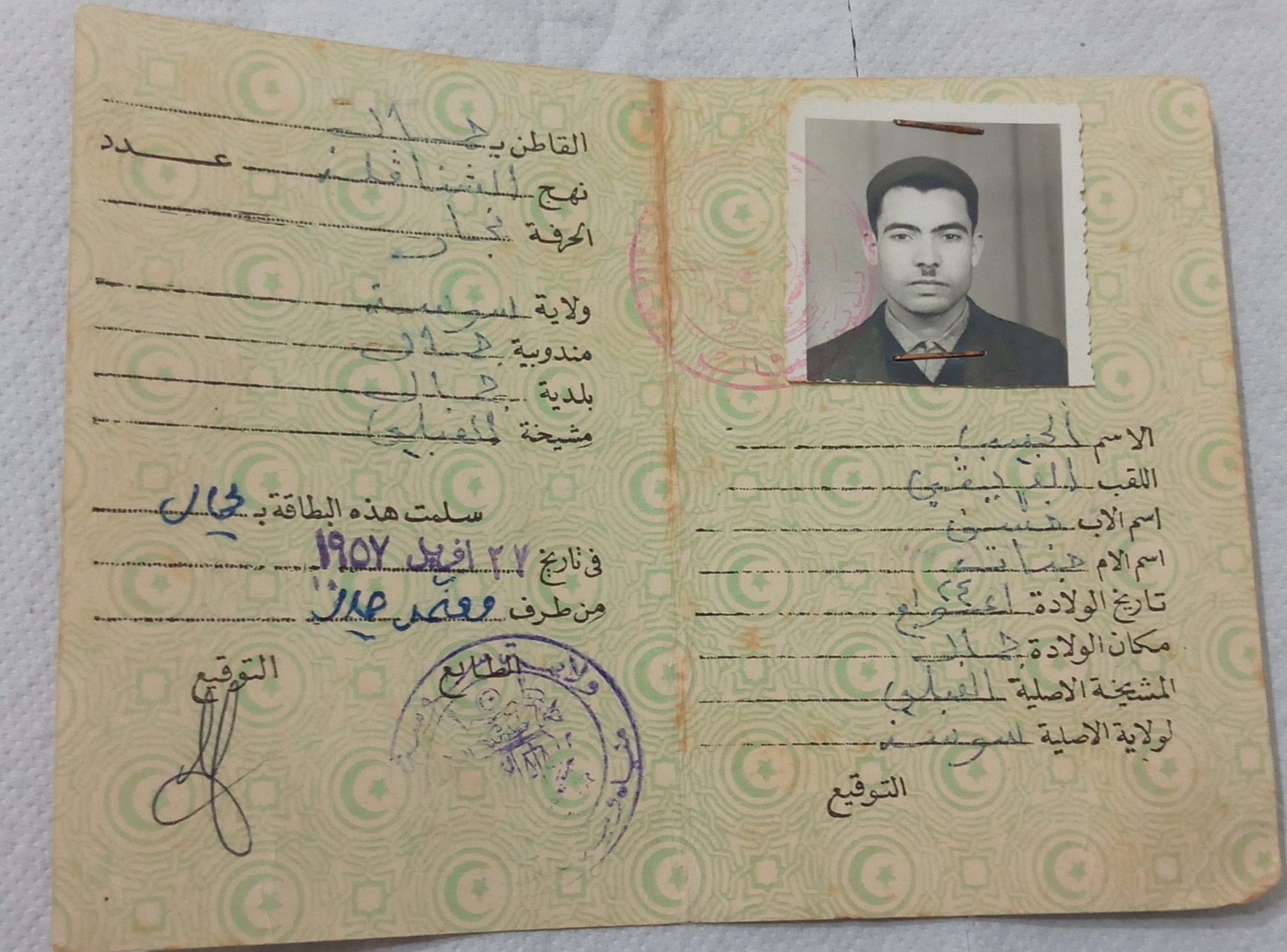

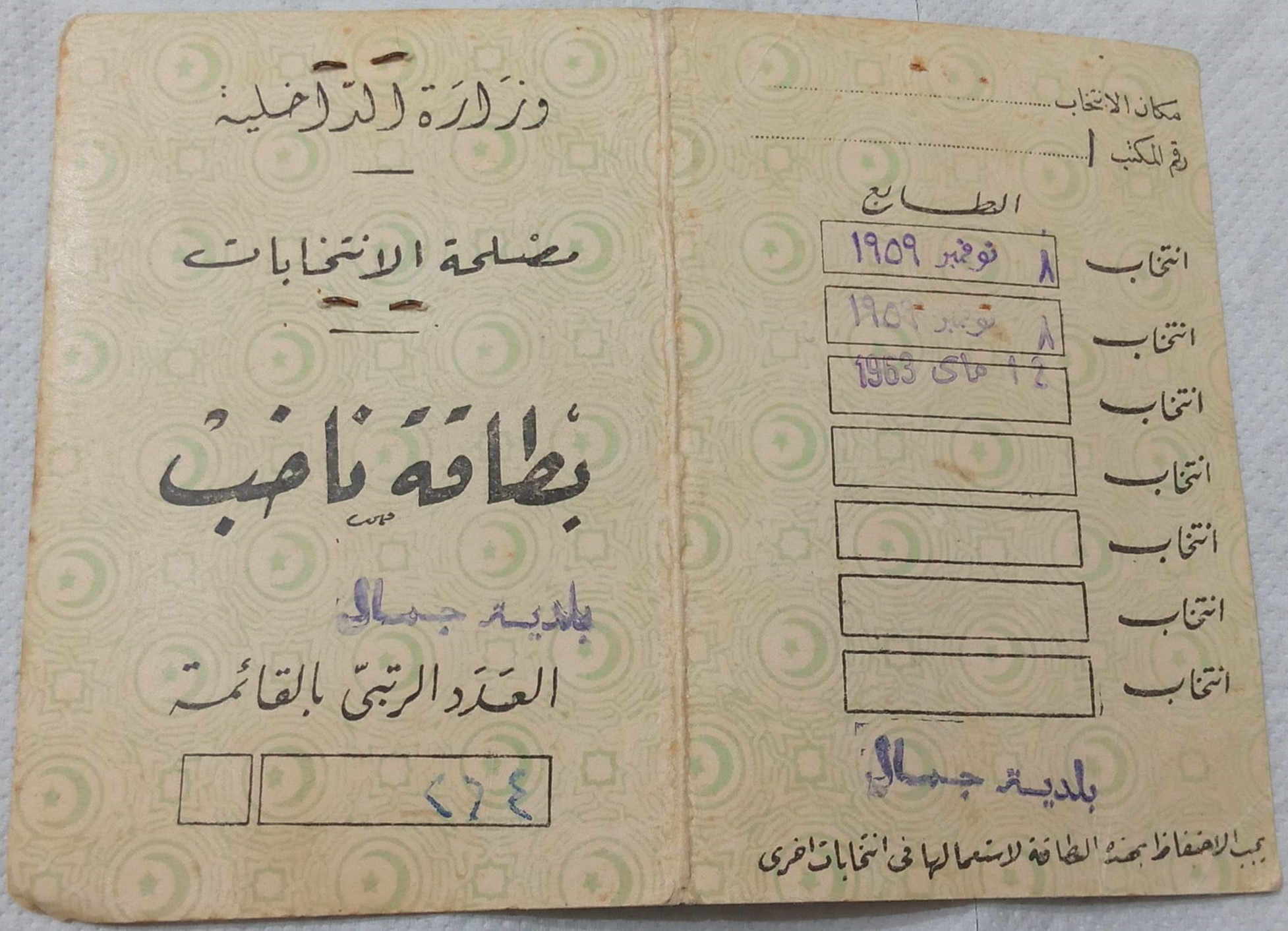

== External references ==
- Come One, Come All to Vote...
- A. Savelieva. Vote. (Савельева А. А. Отдай голос.) in Russian
- All Russian voters will be sent two voter invitation cards for the Duma elections (Все российские избиратели получат по два приглашения на думские выборы). in Russian
- Invitations for Kids Party
