= August Wöginger =

Austrian politician (born 1974)

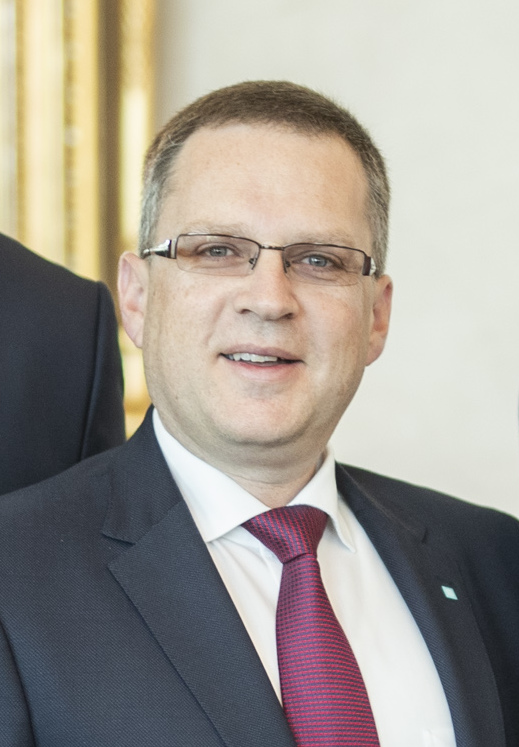

Parliamentary Leader of the People's Party
- Incumbent
- Assumed office 3 December 2021
- Preceded by: Sebastian Kurz
- In office 3 January 2020 – 13 October 2021
- Preceded by: Sebastian Kurz
- Succeeded by: Sebastian Kurz
- In office 19 December 2017 – 21 October 2019
- Preceded by: Sebastian Kurz
- Succeeded by: Sebastian Kurz

Member of the National Council
- Incumbent
- Assumed office 20 December 2002
- Nominated by: Wolfgang Schüssel

Personal details
- Born: 2 November 1974 (age 51) Passau, Lower Bavaria, Germany
- Party: Austrian People's Party
- Children: 3

August Wöginger (born 2 November 1974) is an Austrian politician currently serving as parliamentary leader of the Austrian People's Party and Member of the National Council. He represents his native constituency of Innviertel. He resigned from office in May 2026 after having been convicted of misuse of office, but is planning another candidature for September 2026.
