= Elections in Austria =

On the federal level, there are two main elections in Austria: presidential elections and elections to determine the composition of the National Council (Nationalrat), the lower house of Austria's bicameral Parliament. The upper house, the Federal Council consists of delegates from the states and is not directly elected. These elections are governed by federal law, which also applies to European Parliament elections.

Austria's federal president (Bundespraesident) is elected for a six-year term, most recently in 2022 Austrian presidential election. The election takes place under the two-round system to ensure that the president is supported by a majority of the voters. Under this system, a first round of voting is held, and unless one candidate gets a majority there, a second round is held where only the two highest-ranking candidates from the first round are included.

The National Council is elected by proportional representation. Elections take place every five years, except that a snap election may be called if the chancellor wants early elections or loses the support of a majority in the National Council, as happened in 2017 and again in 2019.

Austria has a multi-party system. From 1945 to 1983, Austrian politics had a two-party system, where two main parties, the SPÖ on the center-left and the ÖVP on the center-right, generally dominated politics, and were the only parties to form government, most often forming a grand coalition when neither party had a majority of seats.

Starting in 1983, as the right-wing Freedom Party started to win more seats, the coalitions that emerged depended on whether SPO or OVP was responsible for forming government. If it was SPO, the result was a grand coalition of the two centrist parties. However, if the OVP won the most votes, as it did on five occasions, it had the option of forming a coalition with the far right Freedom Party instead of the centre left SPO. This is what it did in 1983, 1999, 2002 and 2017. Following the 2019 National Council elections, the victorious ÖVP negotiated a coalition agreement with the Green Party instead, bringing the Green Party into the government for the first time.

For a party to be represented in the National Council, it must either pass the threshold of at least 4% of all valid votes cast nationwide, or win one mandate (seat) in one of the regional electoral districts. If a party doesn't satisfy either requirement, it does not participate in the allocation of seats. This threshold exists to discourage parties from splintering and producing an unmanageably large number of small parties in parliament.

In some cases, a national referendum can be called by the Austrian Parliament.

In 2007, the voting age was lowered from 18 to 16 in all federal elections. Some states had already lowered the voting age for state and local election before 2007.

== Voting rights and restrictions ==
Austrian election law distinguishes between the "active" right to vote and the "passive" right to be elected, i.e. stand as a candidate (actives vs. passives Wahlrecht), with different minimum-age requirements. Citizens who will have attained age 16 by election day and older may exercise the right to vote in elections at all levels of government. Citizens 18 and up may stand as candidates in elections except for presidential elections, in which the minimum age to stand as a candidate is 35.

Citizens of other European Union member states with a permanent residence in Austria may vote in European Union elections and in municipal elections.

Citizens who are sentenced to more than five years of imprisonment can lose their voting rights for the duration of their sentence if the judge determines that such a suspension is warranted. This preclusion period is shortened to one year for specific offenses (such as terrorism, voter fraud, and treason).

Until 2011, members of current or former ruling noble houses (i.e. members of the Habsburg family) were ineligible for office.

== The Proportional Representation (PR) System in Austria ==
The overall objective of Austria’s election system for parliament and other legislative bodies is to assure the proportional allocation of seats based on the share of the votes received by the political parties at the polls so that the composition of the legislative body will faithfully represent the preferences of the electorate.

This system requires voters to select among political parties on their ballot, rather than among competing candidates. The standard manner of expressing that choice is by placing an ‘x’ in the circle next to the name of the party on the paper ballot (Stimmzettel). There is as yet no legal basis for e-voting in Austrian elections. Voters have some ability to affect the fortunes of particular candidates on their favored party’s list by casting preference votes. When doing so, however, they may not cross party-lines. Any preference votes for candidates of another party are invalid. Austria’s version of PR thus basically remains a party-list system despite the preference-vote feature.

Conversion of votes to seats in federal parliamentary elections

In elections for the National Council (Nationalrat), which is the lower house of Austria’s parliament, proportionality is maximized through the utilization of a three-stage process of allocating mandates; in state and local elections a similar method is used, but it is simpler: it only involves two stages. There are also some minor differences among states because each state has its own election law for state and local elections, whereas the National Council elections are governed by a specific federal election act (Nationalrats-Wahlordnung 1992). Presidential elections and European Parliament elections are also governed by federal law.

For purposes of National Council elections, each state (Bundesland) constitutes an electoral unit (Landwahlkreis), and each of the nine states is subdivided into regional electoral districts (Regionalwahlkreise), for a total of 39. Political parties may compete nationwide, but are not required to do so. In order to receive any representation in the National Council, however, a party must satisfy at least one of two alternative conditions: Win a basic mandate (Direktmandat) in one of the regional districts or receive at least 4% of all valid votes cast nationwide.

In order to win a basic mandate, the party must receive enough votes to meet or exceed the Wahlzahl in at least one regional district. The Wahlzahl is not a number fixed by law, but is determined by dividing the total number of valid votes cast in the state by the total number of mandates available to be allocated for that state. The number of mandates apportioned to states varies because of large differences in population size. It is periodically readjusted based on the results of the most recent census to assure that each vote has the same weight regardless of where in the country it is cast.

Any remaining votes (i.e. votes that did not result in the allocation of a seat as a Direktmandat) are then aggregated in the next stage of the process, in which seats based on the Wahlzahl are allocated based on the combined number of votes in the larger electoral unit. This procedure prevents votes that were not applied to meeting the Wahlzahl, and did not, therefore, contribute to the allocation of a mandate, from being "lost" or "wasted" and not having an impact on the ultimate election outcome. In National Council elections, any remaining seats in the 183-member body, i.e. seats not filled through the first two stages of the votes-to-seats conversion process, are then filled by aggregating votes nationwide and assigning the remaining seats to the parties based on the D'Hondt method. In state elections, there is no third stage because there is no nationwide vote.

Variation of Austria’s PR System of Election at the Sub-national Level

Austria’s constituent states (Bundeslaender) – also frequently referred to as federal provinces in English translation—vary with respect to the minimum-requirement to enter the state legislature. The rules governing such elections are not uniform because they are governed by state law, rather than by national law.

In Styria, for example, no 4% or any other threshold requirement applies. Instead, a party must at least win one basic mandate (Grundmandat) in one of the four regional electoral districts (Wahlkreise); it may then aggregate its remaining votes from all four districts and participate on the allocation of the remaining mandates (Restmandate) in the second stage of the votes-to-seats conversion process. In the Styrian version of PR, the Wahlzahl in the second stage differs from the Wahlzahl that governs the district-per-district allocation of mandates in the first stage. In contrast to federal elections, the Wahlzahl is computed separately for each district. There is, therefore, inter-district variation in the number of votes a party needs to earn a basic mandate.

In the most recent elections for Styria’s legislature (Landtagswahlen) in October 2019, three small parties, including the Communist Party and the NEOS, were able to enter the Landtag by winning at least one Grundmandat in the district that includes Graz, the state’s capital. Each was then eligible to participate in the allocation of the remaining eight mandates (Restmandate), and each won one additional seat, while the remainder went to the larger parties.

As can be seen in this example, smaller parties do better under this variant of the PR system when their electoral support is concentrated geographically. As also illustrated, seemingly arcane details in the mechanics of how votes are counted and converted into seats can have important consequences.

== Latest parliamentary elections ==
=== 2024 legislative election ===
Party	Votes	%	+/–	Seats	+/–
Freedom Party of Austria	1,408,514	28.85	+12.68	57	+26
Austrian People's Party	1,282,734	26.27	–11.19	51	–20
Social Democratic Party of Austria	1,032,234	21.14	–0.04	41	+1
NEOS	446,378	9.14	+1.04	18	+3
The Greens	402,107	8.24	–5.66	16	–10
KPÖ Plus	116,891	2.39	+1.70	0	0
The Beer Party	98,395	2.02	+1.92	0	0
Madeleine Petrovic List	28,488	0.58	New	0	New
None of the Above	27,830	0.57	+0.11	0	0
MFG Austria	19,785	0.41	New	0	New
Gaza List	19,376	0.40	New	0	New
The Yellows (LBL)	156	0.00	New	0	New
Total	4,882,888	100.00	–	183	0
Valid votes	4,882,888	99.05			
Invalid/blank votes	46,857	0.95			
Total votes	4,929,745	100.00			
Registered voters/turnout	6,346,059	77.68			
Source: Interior Ministry, ORF

=== Election results 1945–2024 ===
Summary of Austrian elections for the National Council, 1945–2024
Election year	KPÖ	SPÖ	ÖVP	VdU	FPÖ	Gre	LiF	BZÖ	TS	NEOS	PILZ	Oth	Turnout
1945	5.4	44.6	49.8	-	-	-	-	-	-	-	-	0.2	94.0
1949	5.1	38.7	44.0	11.7	-	-	-	-	-	-	-	0.6	96.8
1953	5.3	42.1	41.3	11.0	-	-	-	-	-	-	-	0.4	95.8
1956	4.4	43.0	46.0	-	6.5	-	-	-	-	-	-	0.0	95.3
1959	3.3	44.8	44.2	-	7.7	-	-	-	-	-	-	0.1	94.2
1962	3.0	44.0	45.4	-	7.0	-	-	-	-	-	-	0.5	93.8
1966	0.4	42.6	48.3	-	5.4	-	-	-	-	-	-	3.3	93.8
1970	1.0	48.4	44.7	-	5.5	-	-	-	-	-	-	0.4	91.8
1971	1.4	50.0	43.1	-	5.5	-	-	-	-	-	-	0.0	92.4
1975	1.2	50.4	42.9	-	5.4	-	-	-	-	-	-	0.0	92.9
1979	1.0	51.0	41.9	-	6.1	-	-	-	-	-	-	0.1	92.2
1983	0.7	47.6	43.2	-	5.0	-	-	-	-	-	-	3.4	92.6
1986	0.7	43.1	41.3	-	9.7	4.8	-	-	-	-	-	0.3	90.5
1990	0.5	42.8	32.1	-	16.6	4.8	-	-	-	-	-	3.8	86.1
1994	0.3	34.9	27.7	-	22.5	7.3	6.0	-	-	-	-	1.4	81.9
1995	0.3	38.1	28.3	-	21.9	4.8	5.5	-	-	-	-	1.1	86.0
1999	0.5	33.2	26.9	-	26.9	7.4	3.6	-	-	-	-	1.5	80.4
2002	0.6	36.5	42.3	-	10.0	9.5	1.0	-	-	-	-	0.3	84.3
2006	1.0	35.3	34.3	-	11.0	11.1	-	4.1	-	-	-	3.1	78.5
2008	0.8	29.3	26.0	-	17.5	10.4	2.1	10.7	-	-	-	4.0	78.8
2013	1.0	26.8	24.0	-	20.5	12.4	-	3.5	5.7	5.0	-	1.0	74.9
2017	0.8	26.9	31.5	-	26.0	3.9	-	-	-	5.3	4.4	2.3	80.0
2019	0.7	21.2	37.5	-	16.2	13.9	-	-	-	8.1	1.9	0.6	75.6
2024	2.4	21.1	26.3	-	28.9	8.2	-	-	-	9.1	-	4.0	77.3

== Latest presidential elections ==
=== 2022 presidential election ===
Candidate	Party	Votes	%
Alexander Van der Bellen	The Greens	2,299,590	56.69
Walter Rosenkranz	Freedom Party of Austria	717,097	17.68
Dominik Wlazny	The Beer Party	337,010	8.31
Tassilo Wallentin	Independent	327,214	8.07
Gerald Grosz	Independent	225,942	5.57
Michael Brunner	MFG Austria	85,465	2.11
Heinrich Staudinger	Independent	64,411	1.59
Total		4,056,729	100.00
Valid votes		4,056,729	97.80
Invalid/blank votes		91,353	2.20
Total votes		4,148,082	100.00
Registered voters/turnout		6,363,336	65.19
Source: Ministry of the Interior

== Latest European elections ==
=== 2024 European election ===
Party	Votes	%	Seats	+/–
Freedom Party of Austria	893,754	25.36	6	+3
Austrian People's Party	864,072	24.52	5	-2
Social Democratic Party of Austria	818,287	23.22	5	0
The Greens – The Green Alternative	390,503	11.08	2	0
NEOS – The New Austria and Liberal Forum	357,214	10.14	2	+1
Communist Party of Austria	104,245	2.96	0	0
Democratic – Neutral – Authentic	95,859	2.72	0	New
Total	3,523,934	100.00	20	+2
Valid votes	3,523,934	98.31		
Invalid/blank votes	60,548	1.69		
Total votes	3,584,482	100.00		
Registered voters/turnout	6,372,204	56.25		
Source: Ministry of the Interior (BMI)

== Referendums ==
The Austrian constitution defines two types of referendums on the federal level: binding referendums and non-binding referendums.

=== Binding referendum ===
A binding referendum may be mandatory, meaning that it is legally required to take place according. Mandatory referendums in Austria include :

- if the President is removed from office before the end of his term (Article 60, Section 6 of the Federal Constitution), and
- in case of comprehensive change of the Federal Constitution (Article 44, Section 3 of the Federal Constitution).

A binding referendum is optional in case of non-comprehensive changes in the Federal Constitution. Such facultative referendum is to be conducted if at least one third of the members of the National Council or the Federal Council requests it.

There have only been two binding referendums in post-1945 Austria: The nuclear power referendum in 1978 and the European Union membership referendum which was called because accession to European Union was deemed to be a comprehensive change to the Constitution.

=== Non-binding referendum ===
The National Council has the power to call on a non-binding referendum on matters of great importance. Such a referendum is called by majority of members of the National Council. Results of such a referendum are advisory. There was one such referendum in post-1945 Austria:

- the conscription referendum in 2013

The "no" option won, and the National Council accepted the result of the referendum and acted accordingly.

== See also ==
- Electoral calendar
- Electoral system
