= Caspar Einem =

Austrian politician (1948–2021)

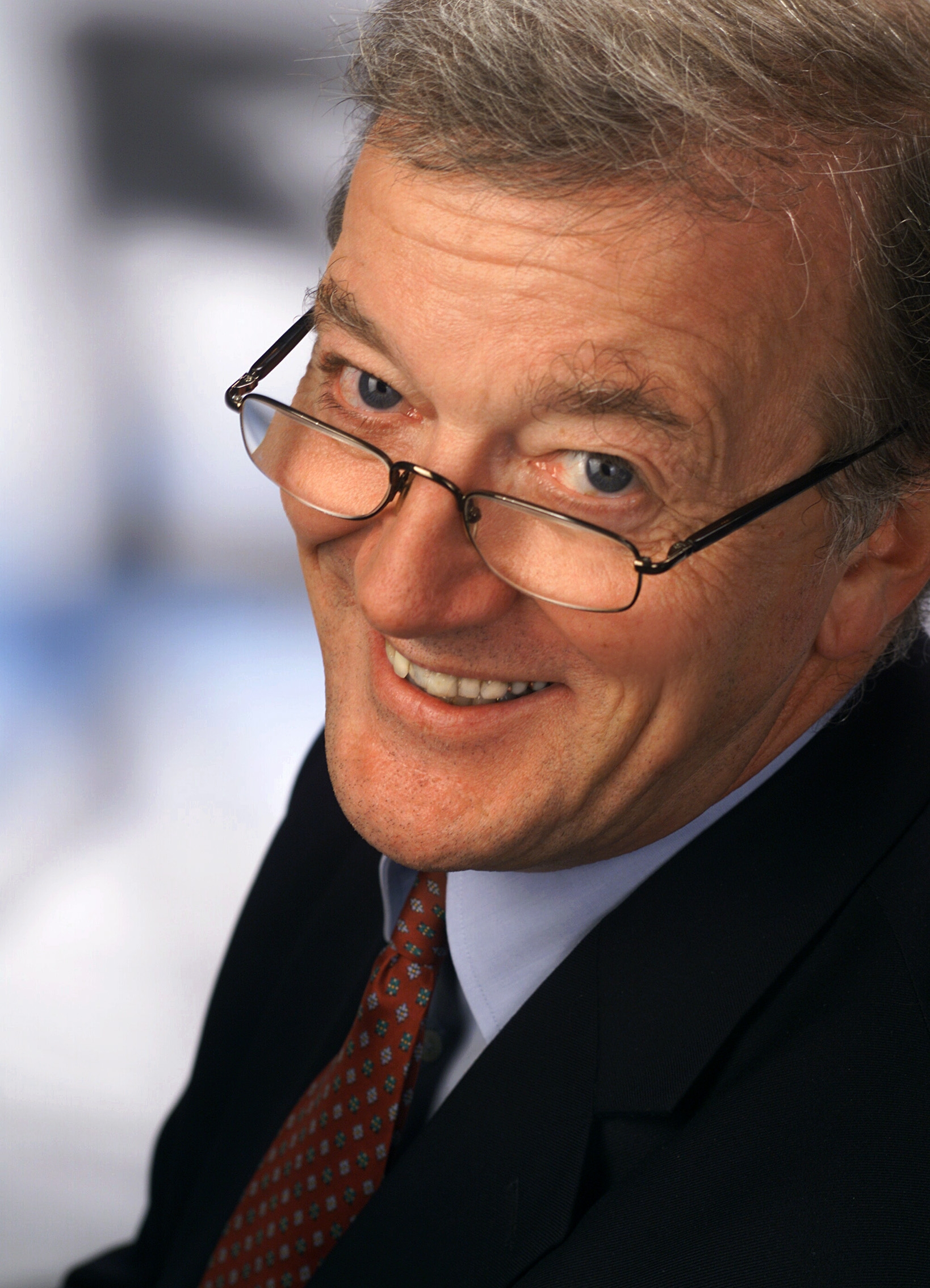

Minister of the Interior
- In office 6 April 1995 – 28 January 1997
- President: José Manuel Barroso
- Preceded by: Franz Löschnak
- Succeeded by: Karl Schlögl

Minister for Science, Traffic and the Arts
- In office 28 January 1997 – 4 February 2000
- Preceded by: Rudolf Scholten
- Succeeded by: Michael Schmid

Personal details
- Born: 6 May 1948 Salzburg, Austria
- Died: 9 September 2021 (aged 73)
- Party: Social Democratic Party of Austria (SPÖ)
- Parent: Gottfried von Einem
- Education: University of Vienna

Caspar Einem (6 May 1948 – 9 September 2021 (Note: news on that day)) was an Austrian politician and minister (SPÖ). He served as a board member of Jetalliance.

== Life and career ==
Einem was born in Salzburg, Allied-occupied Austria, into the Von Einem family, as the son of composer Gottfried von Einem and his first wife, Lianne Mathilde von Bismarck (1919-1962). After studying jurisprudence in Vienna, gaining the degree of Dr. jur. in 1971, Einem worked as a probation officer in Vienna and Salzburg. After this, he worked for the Austrian Chamber of Workers. In 1991, he became a manager for the OMV, Austria's biggest gas and oil company, where he eventually was director of the department for gas. He was vice-president of the European Forum Alpbach.

=== Political career ===
In 1994, Einem became Secretary of State, which boosted his career. From 1995 until 1997 he was Minister of the Interior of Austria, and later, until 2000, Minister for Science, Traffic and the Arts. In his time as Interior Minister, it was his task to clear up the series of briefcase bomb attacks that haunted Austria in those years.

Since the election victory of ÖVP and FPÖ in 2000, he was a member of the National Council of Austria. He was elected in the Central-Western-District of Vienna (Alsergrund), where he was also chairman of the local SPÖ organisation until 2008. Einem was deputy chairman of his party's parliamentary group, spokesman for European Affairs and a highly influential figure in his party. He is considered a liberal leftist and a staunch anti-fascist, always rejecting any kind of collaboration with FPÖ or BZÖ. He served as President of the Social Democratic University Alumni Association, as well as of one of the European social partners CEEP and its Austrian section VÖWG. In October 2012, Einem publicly announced becoming one of the board members of the chartered airplane provider Jetalliance and to withdraw from politics.

=== Private life ===
Einem was married; the couple had a son. He died at age 73.
