= Andrea Kuntzl =

Austrian politician (born 1958)

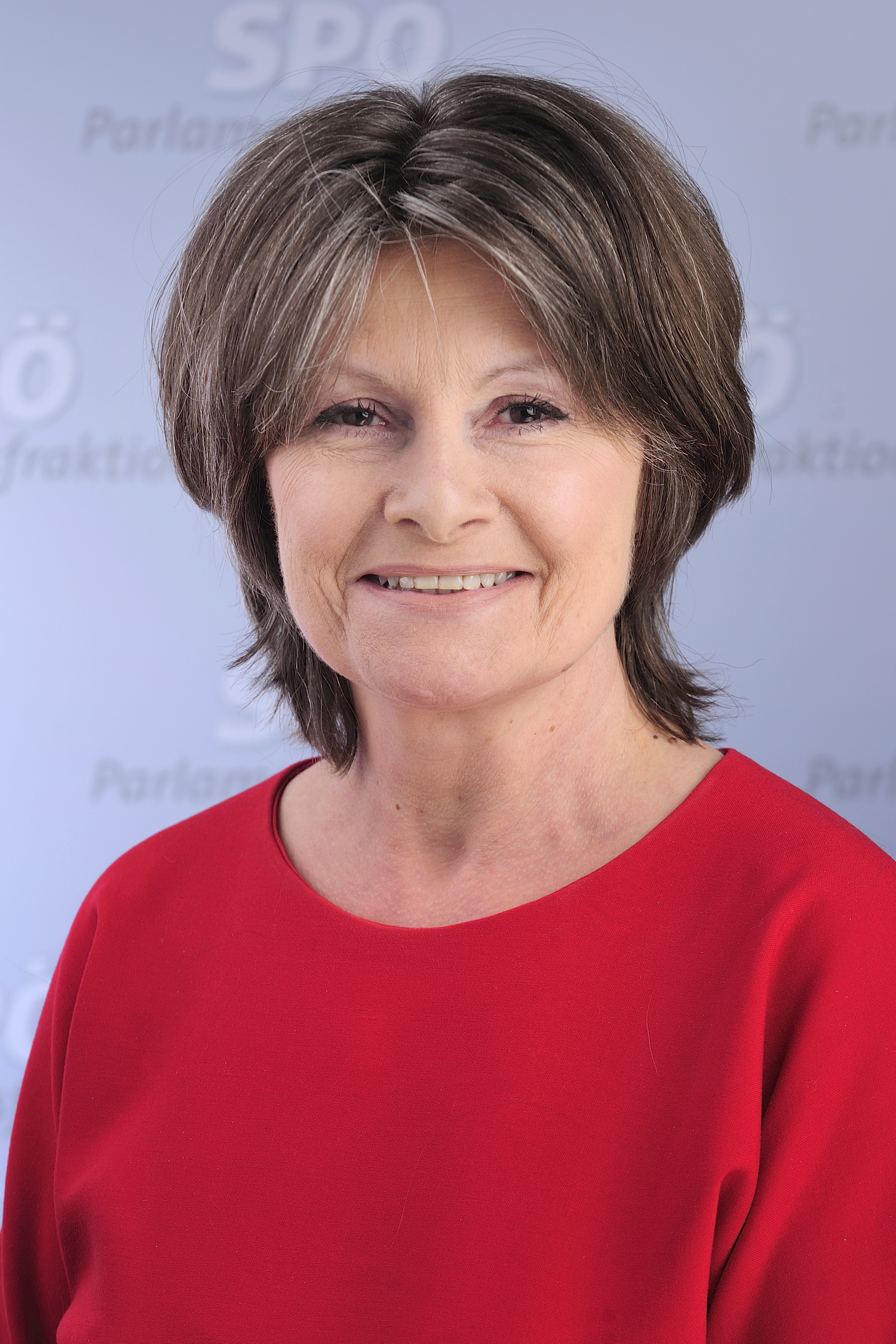
- Kuntzl in April 2014

Member of the National Council
- Incumbent
- Assumed office 20 December 2002
- Constituency: Vienna
- In office 29 October 1999 – 19 December 2002
- Constituency: Federal List

Personal details
- Born: 31 March 1958 (age 68) Vienna, Austria
- Party: Social Democratic Party
- Education: University of Vienna

Andrea Kuntzl (born 31 March 1958) is an Austrian politician and member of the National Council. A member of the Social Democratic Party, she has represented Vienna since December 2002. She was a Federal List member of the National Council from October 1999 to December 2002.

Kuntzl was born on 31 March 1958 in Vienna. She studied at a business academy (Handelsakademie) before receiving a magister degree in sociology from the University of Vienna. She has been active in the Social Democratic Party (SPÖ) and its youth wing Young Generation since 1989 and has held various positions in the party's Viennese branch and at the federal level. She has also held various executive positions in the SPÖ: Head of the Future and Culture Workshop (1992–1996), Federal Women's Secretary (1996–2000) and Federal Executive Director (2000–2003). She was elected to the National Council at the 1999 legislative election.

Kuntzl's partner is Constitutional Court judge Johannes Schnizer.

Electoral history of Andrea Kuntzl
| Election | Electoral district | Party | Votes | % | Result |
|---|---|---|---|---|---|
| 1994 legislative | Vienna Inner West | Social Democratic Party | 169 | 0.82% | Not elected |
| 1994 legislative | Vienna | Social Democratic Party | 21 | 0.01% | Not elected |
| 1995 legislative | Vienna Inner West | Social Democratic Party | 107 | 0.38% | Not elected |
| 1995 legislative | Vienna | Social Democratic Party | 13 | 0.00% | Not elected |
| 1999 legislative | Vienna Inner West | Social Democratic Party | 265 | 1.35% | Not elected |
| 1999 legislative | Vienna | Social Democratic Party | 23 | 0.01% | Not elected |
| 2002 legislative | Vienna Inner West | Social Democratic Party | 904 | 3.85% | Not elected |
| 2002 legislative | Vienna | Social Democratic Party | 315 | 0.08% | Elected |
| 2006 legislative | Vienna Inner West | Social Democratic Party | 949 | 4.71% | Not elected |
| 2006 legislative | Vienna | Social Democratic Party | 928 | 0.28% | Elected |
| 2008 legislative | Vienna Inner West | Social Democratic Party | 571 | 3.44% | Not elected |
| 2008 legislative | Vienna | Social Democratic Party | 147 | 0.05% | Elected |
| 2013 legislative | Vienna Inner West | Social Democratic Party | 671 | 4.48% | Not elected |
| 2013 legislative | Vienna | Social Democratic Party | 183 | 0.07% | Elected |
| 2017 legislative | Vienna Inner West | Social Democratic Party | 405 | 1.60% | Not elected |
| 2017 legislative | Vienna | Social Democratic Party | 183 | 0.06% | Elected |
| 2019 legislative | Vienna Inner West | Social Democratic Party | 531 | 3.71% | Not elected |
| 2019 legislative | Vienna | Social Democratic Party | 105 | 0.05% | Elected |
