= Austrian Association for Public and Social Economy =

Organization based in Vienna, Austria

- Association of Public Services and Enterprises Austria
- Verband der öffentlichen Wirtschaft und Gemeinwirtschaft Österreichs
- Abbreviation: VÖWG
- Founded: 1952
- Headquarters: Vienna, Austria
- Location: Austria
- Key people: Renate Brauner, president; Erich Haider, vice president; Herbert Tumpel, vice president; Heidrun Maier-de Kruijff, chairwoman
- Affiliations: European Centre of Enterprises with Public Participation and of Enterprises of General economic Interest, CEEP
- Website: www.voewg.at

The Austrian Association for Public and Social Economy (German: Verband der Öffentlichen Wirtschaft und Gemeinwirtschaft Österreichs, abbreviated as VÖWG) is the Austrian lobby of enterprises and institutions of public interest, as well as establishments, which carry out services of general interest, whatever their ownership or status, also in the form of Public-Private Partnerships. VÖWG also acts as the Austrian section of the European Centre of Enterprises with Public Participation and of Enterprises of General Economic Interest (CEEP) in Brussels as well as of the International Centre of Research and Information on the Public, Social and Cooperative Economy (CIRIEC) in Liège. Being member to those organisations the association also represents its members’ interests on the boards and institutions of the European Union and therefore is able to co-shape decisions of European Law.

== Development ==
The association was formed in 1952, using the name of "Working group for Austrian Public Economy". In the year of 1990 it was renamed as "Austrian Association for Public and Social Economy". When the importance of local tasks and services grew following the years of reconstruction, for three decades local representatives as Vienna City Executive Councilors Franz Nekula and Fritz Hofmann as well as chairman of parliament of state Johann Hatzl served as presidents. On November 16, 2011 Vienna City Executive Councilor Renate Brauner was elected president. Brauner follows Christian Oxonitsch who held the office since 2007.

The office of chairwoman is held Heidrun Maier-de Kruijff who is also chairwoman of the Austrian Association of Local Enterprises (Verband kommunaler Unternehmen Österreichs (VKÖ). Before that Maier-de Kruijff has been office manager of MEP Hannes Swoboda in Brussels and Strasbourg.

== See also ==
- Public services
