= Vienna Inner West (National Council electoral district) =

Parliamentary electoral district in Austria

- Wien Innen-West
- Electoral District for the National Council
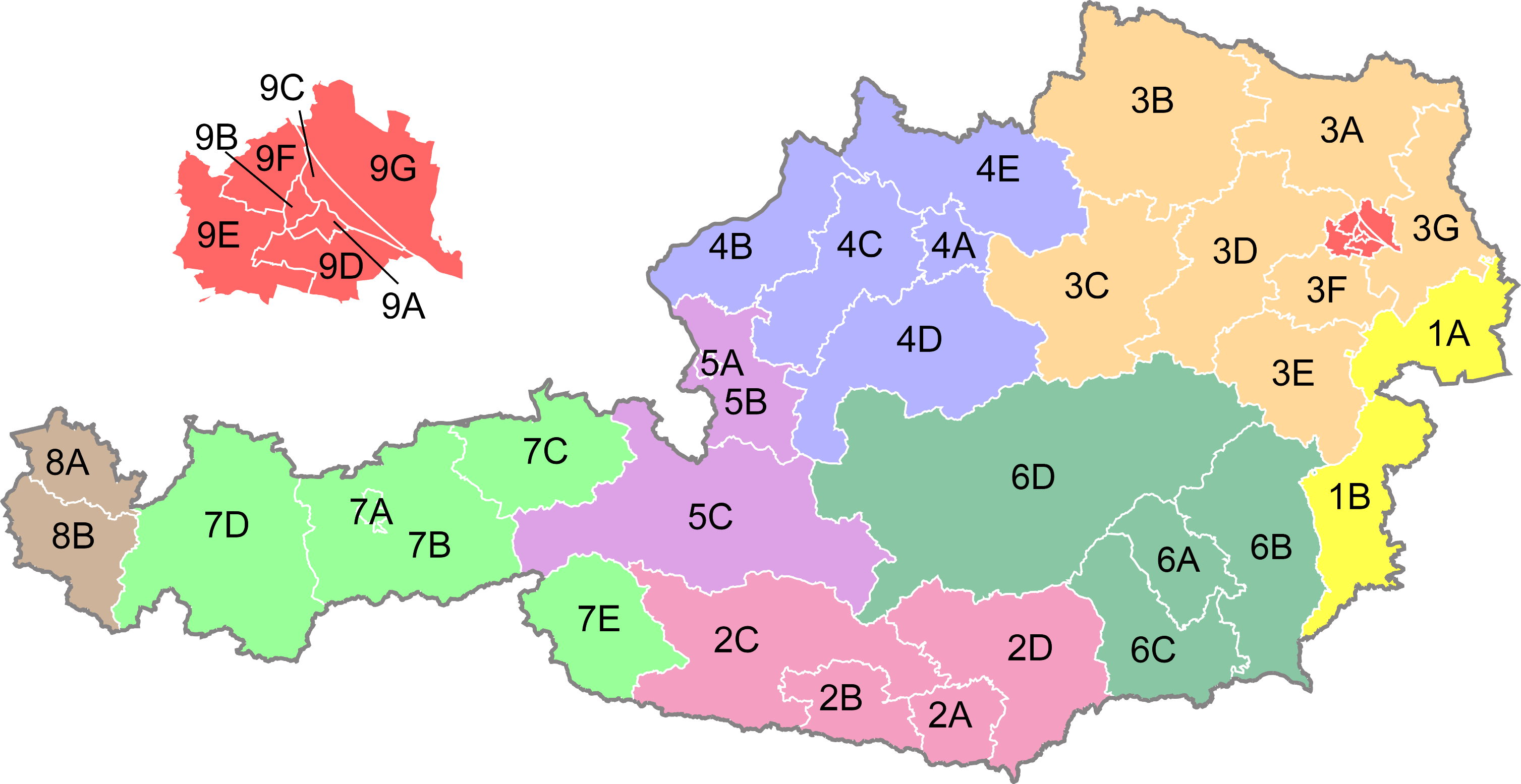
- The 39 regional electotral districts
- District: List: Alsergrund; Innere Stadt; Josefstadt; Mariahilf; Neubau
- State: Vienna
- Population: 145,567 (2024)
- Electorate: 94,800 (2019)
- Area: 10 km^{2} (2023)

Current Electoral District
- Created: 1994
- Seats: 3 (1994–present)
- Created from: Vienna

Vienna Inner West (German: Wien Innen-West), also known as Electoral District 9B (German: Wahlkreis 9B), is one of the 39 multi-member regional electoral districts of the National Council, the lower house of the Austrian Parliament, the national legislature of Austria. The electoral district was created in 1992 when electoral regulations were amended to add regional electoral districts to the existing state-wide electoral districts and came into being at the following legislative election in 1994. It consists of the districts of Alsergrund, Innere Stadt, Josefstadt, Mariahilf and Neubau in the city-state of Vienna. The electoral district currently elects three of the 183 members of the National Council using the open party-list proportional representation electoral system. At the 2019 legislative election the constituency had 94,800 registered electors.

== History ==
Vienna Inner West was one 43 regional electoral districts (regionalwahlkreise) established by the "National Council Electoral Regulations 1992" (Nationalrats-Wahlordnung 1992) passed by the National Council in 1992. It consisted of the districts of Alsergrund, Innere Stadt, Josefstadt, Mariahilf and Neubau in the city-state of Vienna. The district was initially allocated three seats in May 1993.

== Electoral system ==
Vienna Inner West currently elects three of the 183 members of the National Council using the open party-list proportional representation electoral system. The allocation of seats is carried out in three stages. In the first stage, seats are allocated to parties (lists) at the regional level using a state-wide Hare quota (wahlzahl) (valid votes in the state divided by the number of seats in the state). In the second stage, seats are allocated to parties at the state/provincial level using the state-wide Hare quota (any seats won by the party at the regional stage are subtracted from the party's state seats). In the third and final stage, seats are allocated to parties at the federal/national level using the D'Hondt method (any seats won by the party at the regional and state stages are subtracted from the party's federal seats). Only parties that reach the 4% national threshold, or have won a seat at the regional stage, compete for seats at the state and federal stages.

Electors may cast one preferential vote for individual candidates at the regional, state and federal levels. Split-ticket voting (panachage), or voting for more than one candidate at each level, is not permitted and will result in the ballot paper being invalidated. At the regional level, candidates must receive preferential votes amounting to at least 14% of the valid votes cast for their party to over-ride the order of the party list (10% and 7% respectively for the state and federal levels). Prior to April 2013 electors could not cast preferential votes at the federal level and the thresholds candidates needed to over-ride the party list order were higher at the regional level (half the Hare quota or 1/6 of the party votes) and state level (Hare quota).

== Election results ==
=== Summary ===
Election	Communists KPÖ+ / KPÖ			Social Democrats SPÖ			Greens GRÜNE			NEOS NEOS / LiF			People's ÖVP			Freedom FPÖ		
Election	Votes	%	Seats	Votes	%	Seats	Votes	%	Seats	Votes	%	Seats	Votes	%	Seats	Votes	%	Seats
2019	643	0.86%	0	14,315	19.12%	0	24,037	32.10%	0	10,517	14.05%	0	16,990	22.69%	0	4,926	6.58%	0
2017	1,505	1.92%	0	25,290	32.34%	0	7,978	10.20%	0	7,549	9.65%	0	19,159	24.50%	0	7,771	9.94%	0
2013	1,595	2.25%	0	14,968	21.14%	0	19,573	27.64%	0	9,170	12.95%	0	13,589	19.19%	0	7,020	9.91%	0
2008	1,050	1.42%	0	16,605	22.40%	0	20,584	27.77%	0	5,398	7.28%	0	18,451	24.89%	0	7,540	10.17%	0
2006	1,201	1.64%	0	20,135	27.51%	0	22,097	30.19%	0				21,652	29.58%	0	5,472	7.48%	0
2002	423	0.52%	0	23,493	28.61%	0	21,651	26.36%	0	954	1.16%	0	30,175	36.74%	1	5,093	6.20%	0
1999	730	0.94%	0	19,668	25.42%	0	12,712	16.43%	0	9,665	12.49%	0	18,736	24.22%	0	14,485	18.72%	0
1995	256	0.30%	0	28,178	33.26%	1	8,111	9.57%	0	9,888	11.67%	0	23,663	27.93%	0	13,727	16.20%	0
1994	290	0.37%	0	20,669	26.54%	0	11,542	14.82%	0	10,147	13.03%	0	19,595	25.16%	0	14,660	18.82%	0

=== Detailed ===
==== 2010s ====
===== 2019 =====
Results of the 2019 legislative election held on 29 September 2019:

Party		Votes per district						Total votes	%	Seats
Party		Alser- grund	Innere Stadt	Josef- stadt	Maria- hilf	Neu- bau	Voting card	Total votes	%	Seats
The Greens – The Green Alternative	GRÜNE	6,408	1,667	4,120	5,148	6,044	650	24,037	32.10%	0
Austrian People's Party	ÖVP	4,390	3,274	2,912	3,001	2,892	521	16,990	22.69%	0
Social Democratic Party of Austria	SPÖ	3,919	1,487	2,283	3,211	3,121	294	14,315	19.12%	0
NEOS – The New Austria	NEOS	2,827	1,493	1,813	1,913	2,121	350	10,517	14.05%	0
Freedom Party of Austria	FPÖ	1,340	677	781	1,059	928	141	4,926	6.58%	0
JETZT	JETZT	708	259	510	532	692	94	2,795	3.73%	0
KPÖ Plus	KPÖ+	180	36	133	132	153	9	643	0.86%	0
Der Wandel	WANDL	112	26	63	80	110	10	401	0.54%	0
The Beer Party	BIER	92	23	44	55	38	4	256	0.34%	0
Valid Votes		19,976	8,942	12,659	15,131	16,099	2,073	74,880	100.00%	0
Rejected Votes		97	21	61	87	73	8	347	0.46%	
Total Polled		20,073	8,963	12,720	15,218	16,172	2,081	75,227	79.35%	
Registered Electors		26,128	11,772	15,824	20,431	20,645		94,800		
Turnout		76.83%	76.14%	80.38%	74.48%	78.33%		79.35%		

===== 2017 =====
Results of the 2017 legislative election held on 15 October 2017:

Party		Votes per district						Total votes	%	Seats
Party		Alser- grund	Innere Stadt	Josef- stadt	Maria- hilf	Neu- bau	Voting card	Total votes	%	Seats
Social Democratic Party of Austria	SPÖ	6,812	2,383	4,060	5,622	5,830	583	25,290	32.34%	0
Austrian People's Party	ÖVP	4,929	3,680	3,374	3,317	3,216	643	19,159	24.50%	0
Peter Pilz List	PILZ	2,139	701	1,425	1,703	1,974	228	8,170	10.45%	0
The Greens – The Green Alternative	GRÜNE	2,108	616	1,352	1,665	2,002	235	7,978	10.20%	0
Freedom Party of Austria	FPÖ	2,256	954	1,191	1,685	1,485	200	7,771	9.94%	0
NEOS – The New Austria	NEOS	2,018	977	1,295	1,443	1,511	305	7,549	9.65%	0
Communist Party of Austria	KPÖ	453	60	279	335	350	28	1,505	1.92%	0
My Vote Counts!	GILT	164	38	83	119	126	9	539	0.69%	0
Free List Austria	FLÖ	14	5	9	13	13	2	56	0.07%	0
The Whites	WEIßE	12	7	8	6	22	1	56	0.07%	0
EU Exit Party	EUAUS	12	6	9	12	6	2	47	0.06%	0
Homeless in Politics	ODP	9	3	11	7	8	0	38	0.05%	0
Socialist Left Party	SLP	12	0	5	5	9	0	31	0.04%	0
Valid Votes		20,938	9,430	13,101	15,932	16,552	2,236	78,189	100.00%	0
Rejected Votes		85	37	61	71	73	7	334	0.43%	
Total Polled		21,023	9,467	13,162	16,003	16,625	2,243	78,523	81.50%	
Registered Electors		26,590	12,034	16,179	20,793	20,751		96,347		
Turnout		79.06%	78.67%	81.35%	76.96%	80.12%		81.50%		

===== 2013 =====
Results of the 2013 legislative election held on 29 September 2013:

Party		Votes per district						Total votes	%	Seats
Party		Alser- grund	Innere Stadt	Josef- stadt	Maria- hilf	Neu- bau	Voting card	Total votes	%	Seats
The Greens – The Green Alternative	GRÜNE	5,162	1,474	3,343	4,123	4,838	633	19,573	27.64%	0
Social Democratic Party of Austria	SPÖ	4,176	1,582	2,354	3,217	3,297	342	14,968	21.14%	0
Austrian People's Party	ÖVP	3,346	2,579	2,507	2,321	2,242	594	13,589	19.19%	0
NEOS – The New Austria	NEOS	2,411	1,343	1,588	1,673	1,832	323	9,170	12.95%	0
Freedom Party of Austria	FPÖ	2,083	796	1,085	1,516	1,355	185	7,020	9.91%	0
Team Stronach	FRANK	607	425	335	460	408	59	2,294	3.24%	0
Communist Party of Austria	KPÖ	410	106	281	383	377	38	1,595	2.25%	0
Alliance for the Future of Austria	BZÖ	392	206	283	262	290	79	1,512	2.14%	0
Pirate Party of Austria	PIRAT	231	54	143	170	197	26	821	1.16%	0
Der Wandel	WANDL	48	15	28	32	60	5	188	0.27%	0
Socialist Left Party	SLP	27	2	12	20	22	1	84	0.12%	0
Valid Votes		18,893	8,582	11,959	14,177	14,918	2,285	70,814	100.00%	0
Rejected Votes		244	82	139	229	187	24	905	1.26%	
Total Polled		19,137	8,664	12,098	14,406	15,105	2,309	71,719	73.63%	
Registered Electors		26,856	12,407	16,449	20,831	20,868		97,411		
Turnout		71.26%	69.83%	73.55%	69.16%	72.38%		73.63%		

==== 2000s ====
===== 2008 =====
Results of the 2008 legislative election held on 28 September 2008:

Party		Votes per district						Total votes	%	Seats
Party		Alser- grund	Innere Stadt	Josef- stadt	Maria- hilf	Neu- bau	Voting card	Total votes	%	Seats
The Greens – The Green Alternative	GRÜNE	5,242	1,827	3,484	4,048	4,773	1,210	20,584	27.77%	0
Austrian People's Party	ÖVP	4,452	3,562	3,115	2,948	2,742	1,632	18,451	24.89%	0
Social Democratic Party of Austria	SPÖ	4,716	1,673	2,434	3,355	3,449	978	16,605	22.40%	0
Freedom Party of Austria	FPÖ	2,097	749	1,108	1,633	1,436	517	7,540	10.17%	0
Liberal Forum	LiF	1,338	640	897	1,060	1,150	313	5,398	7.28%	0
Alliance for the Future of Austria	BZÖ	718	454	449	559	517	216	2,913	3.93%	0
Communist Party of Austria	KPÖ	269	85	166	238	253	39	1,050	1.42%	0
Fritz Dinkhauser List – Citizens' Forum Tyrol	FRITZ	134	64	77	99	117	50	541	0.73%	0
Independent Citizens' Initiative Save Austria	RETTÖ	121	47	54	75	55	33	385	0.52%	0
The Christians	DC	83	43	37	65	52	20	300	0.40%	0
Animal Rights Party	TRP	45	39	39	53	50	10	236	0.32%	0
Left	LINKE	30	7	18	27	27	10	119	0.16%	0
Valid Votes		19,245	9,190	11,878	14,160	14,621	5,028	74,122	100.00%	0
Rejected Votes		257	88	148	192	194	69	948	1.26%	
Total Polled		19,502	9,278	12,026	14,352	14,815	5,097	75,070	74.84%	
Registered Electors		27,600	14,009	16,763	21,022	20,910		100,304		
Turnout		70.66%	66.23%	71.74%	68.27%	70.85%		74.84%		

===== 2006 =====
Results of the 2006 legislative election held on 1 October 2006:

Party		Votes per district						Total votes	%	Seats
Party		Alser- grund	Innere Stadt	Josef- stadt	Maria- hilf	Neu- bau	Voting card	Total votes	%	Seats
The Greens – The Green Alternative	GRÜNE	4,936	1,782	3,367	3,995	4,691	3,326	22,097	30.19%	0
Austrian People's Party	ÖVP	4,678	3,377	3,205	3,180	2,987	4,225	21,652	29.58%	0
Social Democratic Party of Austria	SPÖ	5,273	1,780	2,787	3,863	3,922	2,510	20,135	27.51%	0
Freedom Party of Austria	FPÖ	1,451	559	774	1,105	997	586	5,472	7.48%	0
Communist Party of Austria	KPÖ	293	95	175	266	240	132	1,201	1.64%	0
Hans-Peter Martin's List	MATIN	326	117	155	216	216	157	1,187	1.62%	0
Alliance for the Future of Austria	BZÖ	267	135	165	179	191	156	1,093	1.49%	0
EU Withdrawal – Neutral Free Austria	NFÖ	57	24	29	29	31	27	197	0.27%	0
Socialist Left Party	SLP	56	12	16	33	33	18	168	0.23%	0
Valid Votes		17,337	7,881	10,673	12,866	13,308	11,137	73,202	100.00%	0
Rejected Votes		201	68	91	129	140	61	690	0.93%	
Total Polled		17,538	7,949	10,764	12,995	13,448	11,198	73,892	73.18%	
Registered Electors		27,146	15,567	16,702	20,912	20,642		100,969		
Turnout		64.61%	51.06%	64.45%	62.14%	65.15%		73.18%		

===== 2002 =====
Results of the 2002 legislative election held on 24 November 2002:

Party		Votes per district						Total votes	%	Seats
Party		Alser- grund	Innere Stadt	Josef- stadt	Maria- hilf	Neu- bau	Voting card	Total votes	%	Seats
Austrian People's Party	ÖVP	6,649	4,392	4,518	4,602	4,312	5,702	30,175	36.74%	1
Social Democratic Party of Austria	SPÖ	5,947	2,244	3,165	4,310	4,275	3,552	23,493	28.61%	0
The Greens – The Green Alternative	GRÜNE	4,862	1,751	3,145	3,978	4,509	3,406	21,651	26.36%	0
Freedom Party of Austria	FPÖ	1,249	637	764	888	873	682	5,093	6.20%	0
Liberal Forum	LiF	226	100	136	184	158	150	954	1.16%	0
Communist Party of Austria	KPÖ	116	30	65	66	97	49	423	0.52%	0
Socialist Left Party	SLP	57	15	19	56	40	12	199	0.24%	0
The Democrats		42	11	21	20	30	15	139	0.17%	0
Valid Votes		19,148	9,180	11,833	14,104	14,294	13,568	82,127	100.00%	1
Rejected Votes		142	60	68	119	103	53	545	0.66%	
Total Polled		19,290	9,240	11,901	14,223	14,397	13,621	82,672	73.82%	
Registered Electors		27,073	28,894	16,122	19,974	19,935		111,998		
Turnout		71.25%	31.98%	73.82%	71.21%	72.22%		73.82%		

The following candidates were elected:

- Party mandates - Franz Morak (ÖVP), 3,279 votes.

Franz Morak (ÖVP) resigned on 4 March 2003 and was replaced by Carina Felzmann (ÖVP) on 5 March 2003.

==== 1990s ====
===== 1999 =====
Results of the 1999 legislative election held on 3 October 1999:

Party		Votes per district						Total votes	%	Seats
Party		Alser- grund	Innere Stadt	Josef- stadt	Maria- hilf	Neu- bau	Voting card	Total votes	%	Seats
Social Democratic Party of Austria	SPÖ	4,812	1,686	2,366	3,400	3,452	3,952	19,668	25.42%	0
Austrian People's Party	ÖVP	3,799	2,624	2,598	2,655	2,463	4,597	18,736	24.22%	0
Freedom Party of Austria	FPÖ	3,530	1,621	1,963	2,544	2,309	2,518	14,485	18.72%	0
The Greens – The Green Alternative	GRÜNE	2,780	1,034	1,905	2,196	2,587	2,210	12,712	16.43%	0
Liberal Forum	LiF	2,093	1,125	1,385	1,604	1,634	1,824	9,665	12.49%	0
The Independents	DU	245	97	160	198	211	135	1,046	1.35%	0
Communist Party of Austria	KPÖ	216	50	98	145	142	79	730	0.94%	0
No to NATO and EU – Neutral Austria Citizens' Initiative	NEIN	81	34	35	70	46	50	316	0.41%	0
Valid Votes		17,556	8,271	10,510	12,812	12,844	15,365	77,358	100.00%	0
Rejected Votes		199	55	97	123	133	88	695	0.89%	
Total Polled		17,755	8,326	10,607	12,935	12,977	15,453	78,053	67.95%	
Registered Electors		27,719	31,258	16,083	19,969	19,833		114,862		
Turnout		64.05%	26.64%	65.95%	64.78%	65.43%		67.95%		

===== 1995 =====
Results of the 1995 legislative election held on 17 December 1995:

Party		Votes per district						Total votes	%	Seats
Party		Alser- grund	Innere Stadt	Josef- stadt	Maria- hilf	Neu- bau	Voting card	Total votes	%	Seats
Social Democratic Party of Austria	SPÖ	7,185	2,740	3,709	5,024	5,145	4,375	28,178	33.26%	1
Austrian People's Party	ÖVP	5,125	3,885	3,668	3,656	3,455	3,874	23,663	27.93%	0
Freedom Party of Austria	FPÖ	3,589	1,671	1,951	2,520	2,454	1,542	13,727	16.20%	0
Liberal Forum	LiF	2,380	1,168	1,536	1,751	1,764	1,289	9,888	11.67%	0
The Greens – The Green Alternative	GRÜNE	1,859	647	1,246	1,528	1,664	1,167	8,111	9.57%	0
No – Civic Action Group; Against the Sale of Austria	NEIN	237	92	125	139	124	43	760	0.90%	0
Communist Party of Austria	KPÖ	82	20	28	57	46	23	256	0.30%	0
Natural Law Party	ÖNP	35	15	25	24	25	19	143	0.17%	0
Valid Votes		20,492	10,238	12,288	14,699	14,677	12,332	84,726	100.00%	1
Rejected Votes		232	91	113	180	160	65	841	0.98%	
Total Polled		20,724	10,329	12,401	14,879	14,837	12,397	85,567	74.43%	
Registered Electors		28,703	29,241	16,548	20,273	20,193		114,958		
Turnout		72.20%	35.32%	74.94%	73.39%	73.48%		74.43%		

The following candidates were elected:

- Personal mandates - Caspar Einem (SPÖ), 8,555 votes.

Caspar Einem (SPÖ) resigned on 13 March 1996 and was replaced by Irmtraut Karlsson (SPÖ) on 14 March 1996.

===== 1994 =====
Results of the 1994 legislative election held on 9 October 1994:

Party		Votes per district						Total votes	%	Seats
Party		Alser- grund	Innere Stadt	Josef- stadt	Maria- hilf	Neu- bau	Voting card	Total votes	%	Seats
Social Democratic Party of Austria	SPÖ	5,180	1,945	2,627	3,579	3,483	3,855	20,669	26.54%	0
Austrian People's Party	ÖVP	4,109	2,912	2,776	2,809	2,735	4,254	19,595	25.16%	0
Freedom Party of Austria	FPÖ	3,626	1,734	2,003	2,637	2,472	2,188	14,660	18.82%	0
The Greens – The Green Alternative	GRÜNE	2,611	1,070	1,792	2,083	2,233	1,753	11,542	14.82%	0
Liberal Forum	LiF	2,270	1,351	1,547	1,670	1,738	1,571	10,147	13.03%	0
No – Civic Action Group; Against the Sale of Austria	NEIN	184	67	93	124	127	85	680	0.87%	0
Communist Party of Austria	KPÖ	69	13	47	63	51	47	290	0.37%	0
Natural Law Party	ÖNP	39	18	18	24	26	16	141	0.18%	0
Citizen Greens Austria – Free Democrats	BGÖ	24	14	20	10	13	16	97	0.12%	0
United Greens Austria – List Adi Pinter	VGÖ	11	7	8	10	14	9	59	0.08%	0
Valid Votes		18,123	9,131	10,931	13,009	12,892	13,794	77,880	100.00%	0
Rejected Votes		201	66	94	135	136	84	716	0.91%	
Total Polled		18,324	9,197	11,025	13,144	13,028	13,878	78,596	68.62%	
Registered Electors		28,503	28,819	16,579	20,442	20,196		114,539		
Turnout		64.29%	31.91%	66.50%	64.30%	64.51%		68.62%		
