= Gerald Grosz =

Austrian politician

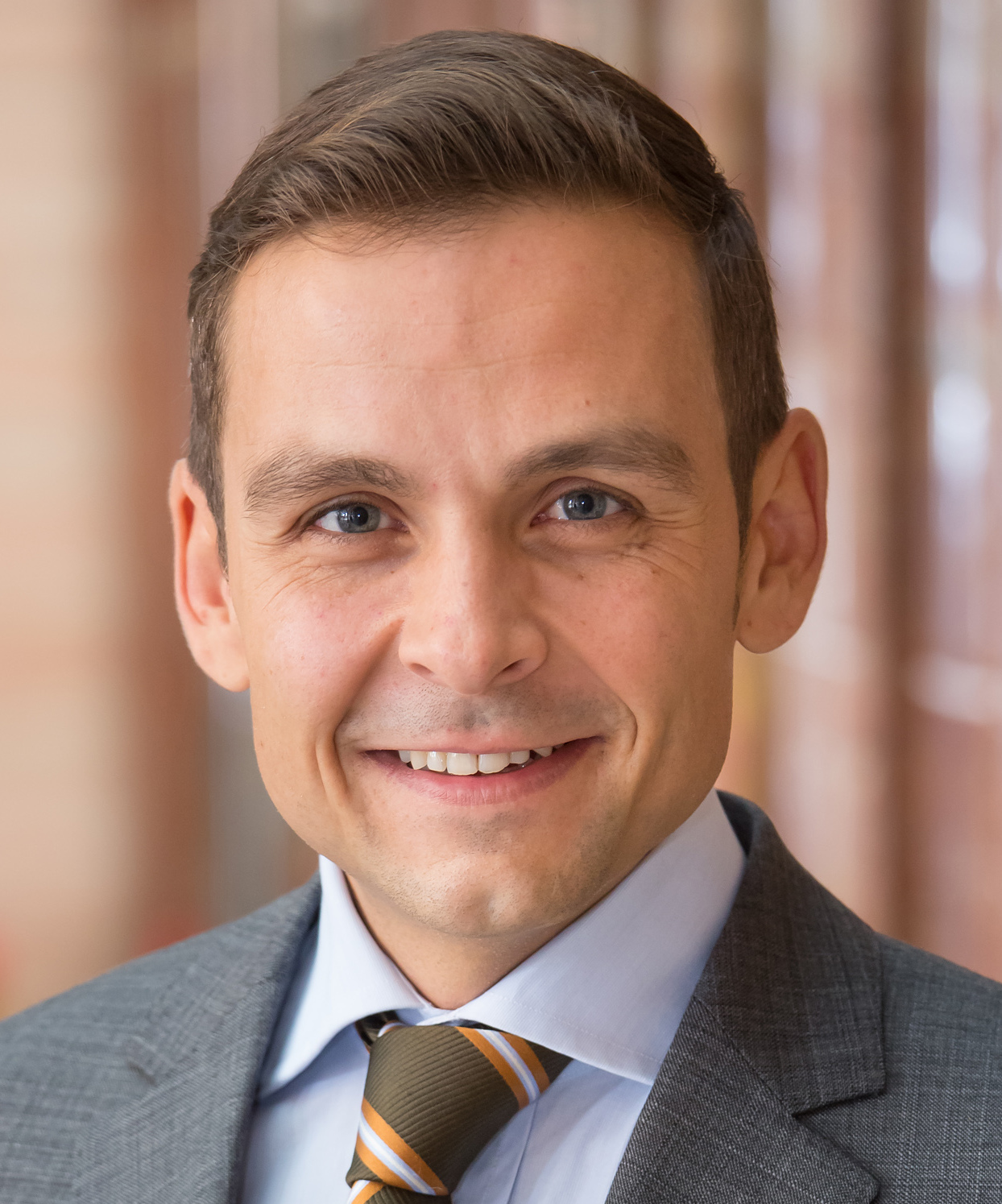
Grosz in 2012

Gerald Grosz (born 15 February 1977) is an Austrian author, commentator, and politician. Formerly a member of the Freedom Party of Austria (FPÖ), he joined the Alliance for the Future of Austria (BZÖ) in 2005 and was elected to the National Council in the 2008 Austrian legislative election. He left office in 2013. The same year, he was elected federal chairman of the BZÖ, serving until 2015. Grosz was an independent candidate for President of Austria in the 2022 election.

== Life and career ==
Grosz was born in Graz and attended school in Deutschlandsberg. Between 1996 and 1999, he completed a commercial apprenticeship at an advertising company in Graz. He owns two consulting companies in the city.

Grosz is homosexual, and entered into a registered partnership with his partner in May 2013. They live together in Graz. Grosz is also a knight of the Habsburg Order of St. George.

== Politics ==
=== Freedom Party ===
In 1992, he joined the Freedom Party of Austria's youth organisation, the Ring of Freedom Youth (RFJ). From 1993 to 1996 he was district chairman of the RFJ in Deutschlandsberg. He was then acting chairman of the FPÖ in Deutschlandsberg until 1999, when he began work as a parliamentary secretary for federal FPÖ parliamentarians Beate Hartinger-Klein and Herbert Haupt. From October 2000 to January 2005, he was press spokesman for Herbert Haupt, then-Minister for Social Affairs and, during 2003, Vice-Chancellor. After his departure, he worked in the same position for state secretary Sigisbert Dolinschek until early 2007. Between 2004 and 2005, Grosz was again FPÖ chairman in Deutschlandsberg.

=== Alliance for the Future of Austria ===
After Jörg Haider left the FPÖ and founded the Alliance for the Future of Austria in April 2005, Grosz quickly joined his new party. He was unanimously elected chairman of the BZÖ's Styria branch at its founding congress in June. He was second on the state list in the 2006 Austrian legislative election, but was not elected. He was subsequently appointed federal general-secretary in October 2006. He served as lead candidate for the municipal elections in Graz in January 2008 and was elected to the city council. In the federal election later that year, he was elected to the National Council.

In April 2009, Grosz was elected one of four federal deputy leaders of the BZÖ under new leader Josef Bucher. He resigned from office in October 2010 due to disagreements over the party's direction. Bucher resigned as chairman after the party's failure in the 2013 Austrian legislative election, and Grosz was elected as his successor. Just 18 months later in March 2015, he stepped down from the position and quit active politics to focus on commercial ventures.

== Retirement ==
Grosz is a board member of the Jörg Haider Society. In 2010, he established the Jörg Haider Medal, which is given "for services to political renewal". On the tenth anniversary of Haider's death in 2018, Grosz awarded the medal to Vice-Chancellor Heinz-Christian Strache as well as former vice-chancellor Herbert Haupt.

Since 2017, Grosz has regularly published videos on social media commentating on political affairs. He is a regular on discussion programs on OE24, including Fellner! Live. Grosz has also written a number of books, published by the Ares publishing house in Graz, known for offering a platform to various far-right authors. His book Freedom without Ifs and Buts, published in June 2021, became a nonfiction bestseller.

=== 2022 presidential election ===
In January 2022, Grosz stated his intention to stand as an independent candidate in the 2022 Austrian presidential election. He officially launched his campaign in June. On 24 August, he announced he had surpassed the 6,000 signatures required to run. By 1 September, he had received over 9,000.

Grosz portrayed himself as an anti-establishment, anti-corruption candidate. His campaign slogan was "Make Austria Grosz Again!", a play on his name's similarity to the word gross, meaning "great". He was supported by the BZÖ. He opposed immigration, European integration, and COVID-19 restrictions. He attributed rising inflation and energy prices to sanctions against Russia over the invasion of Ukraine, and calls for them to be lifted. He described the war as a "regional conflict". Commentators noted that he siphoned votes from the FPÖ, with whom he shared most positions. Grosz said stated he appeals to ÖVP voters who are dissatisfied with the incumbent government.

Grosz won 225,942 votes in the election, a total of 5.57%, placing fifth.
