= 2022 Austrian presidential election =

- 9 October 2022
- Turnout: 65.19% (▼3.31pp)
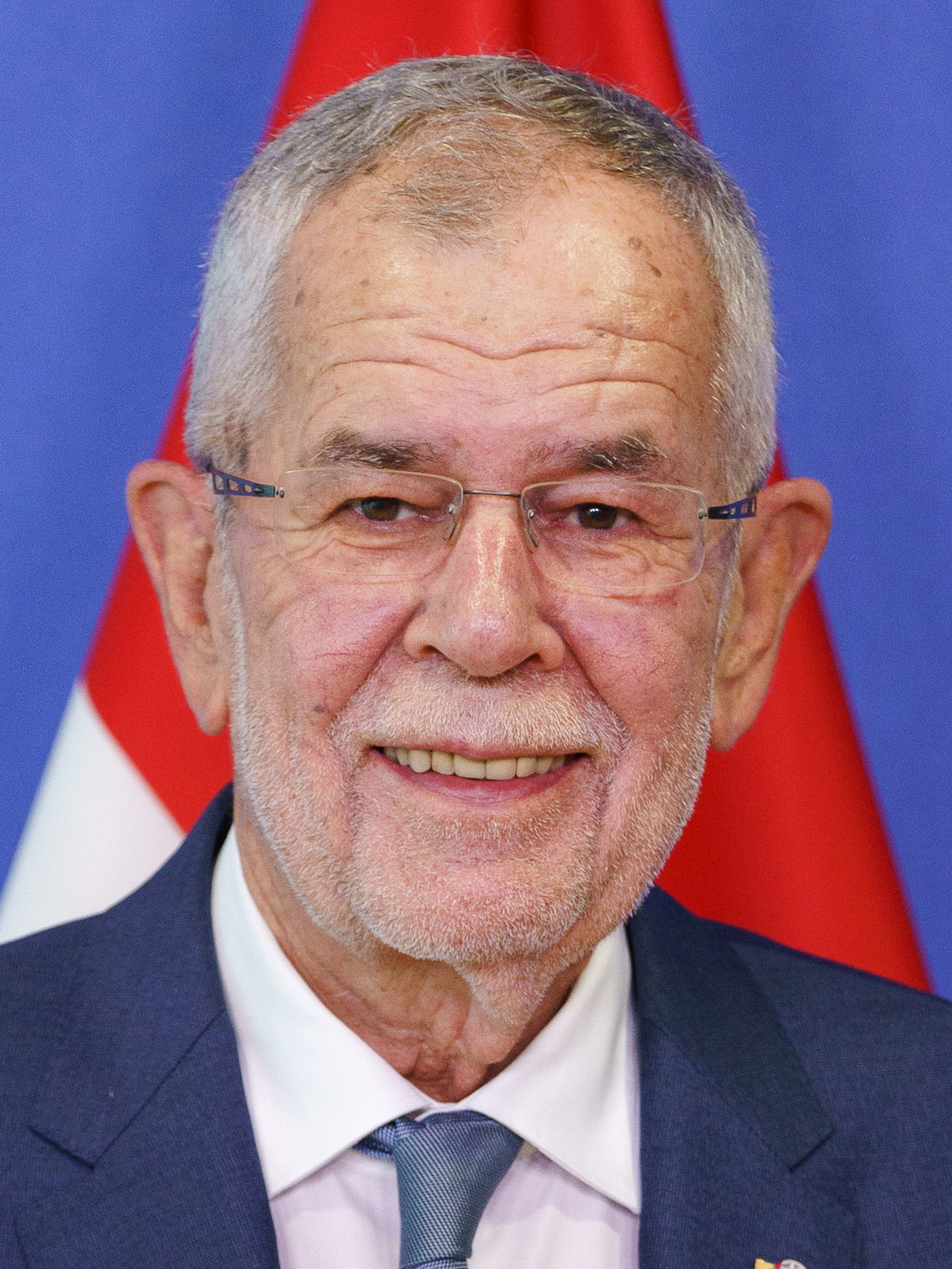

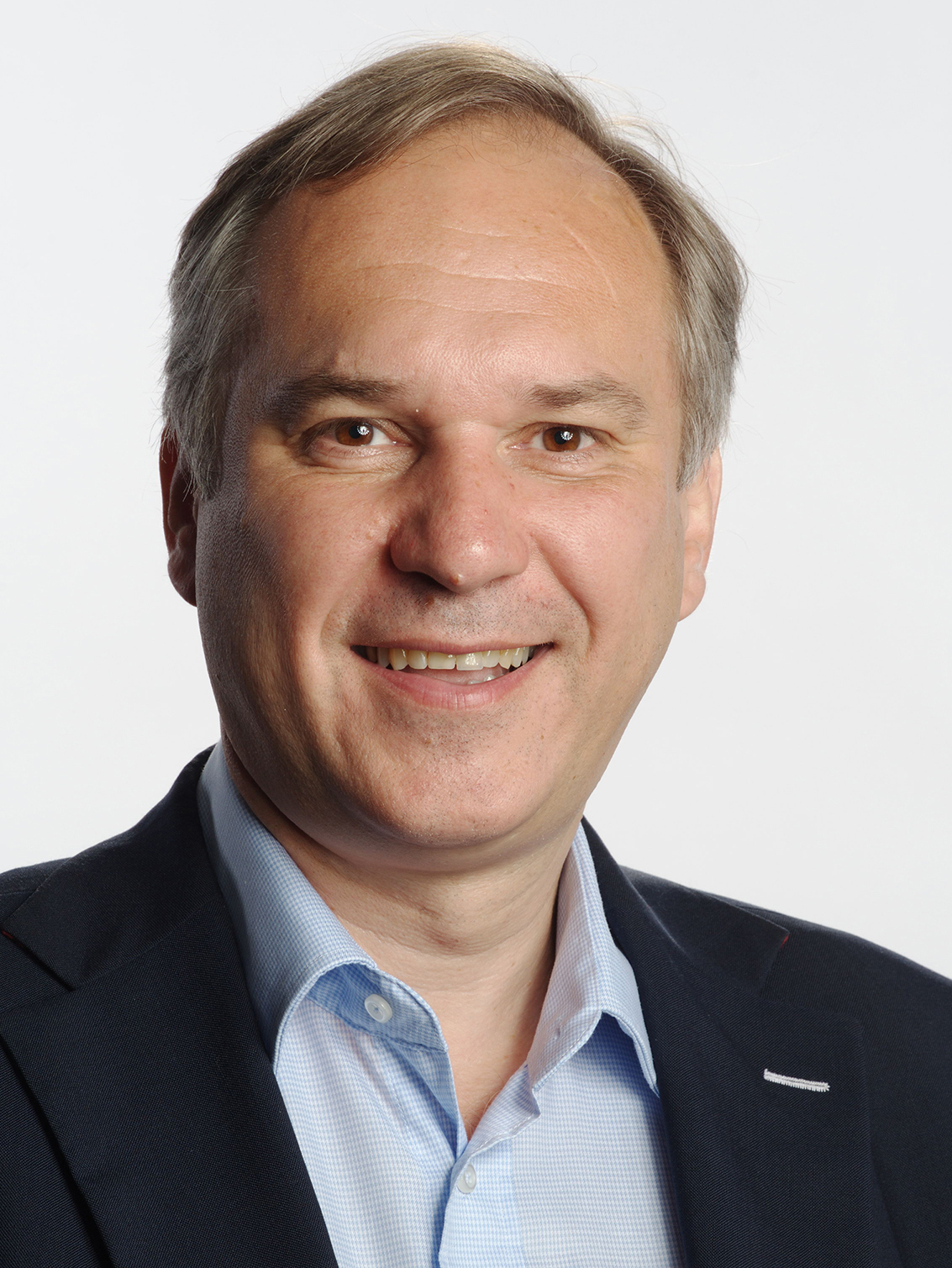

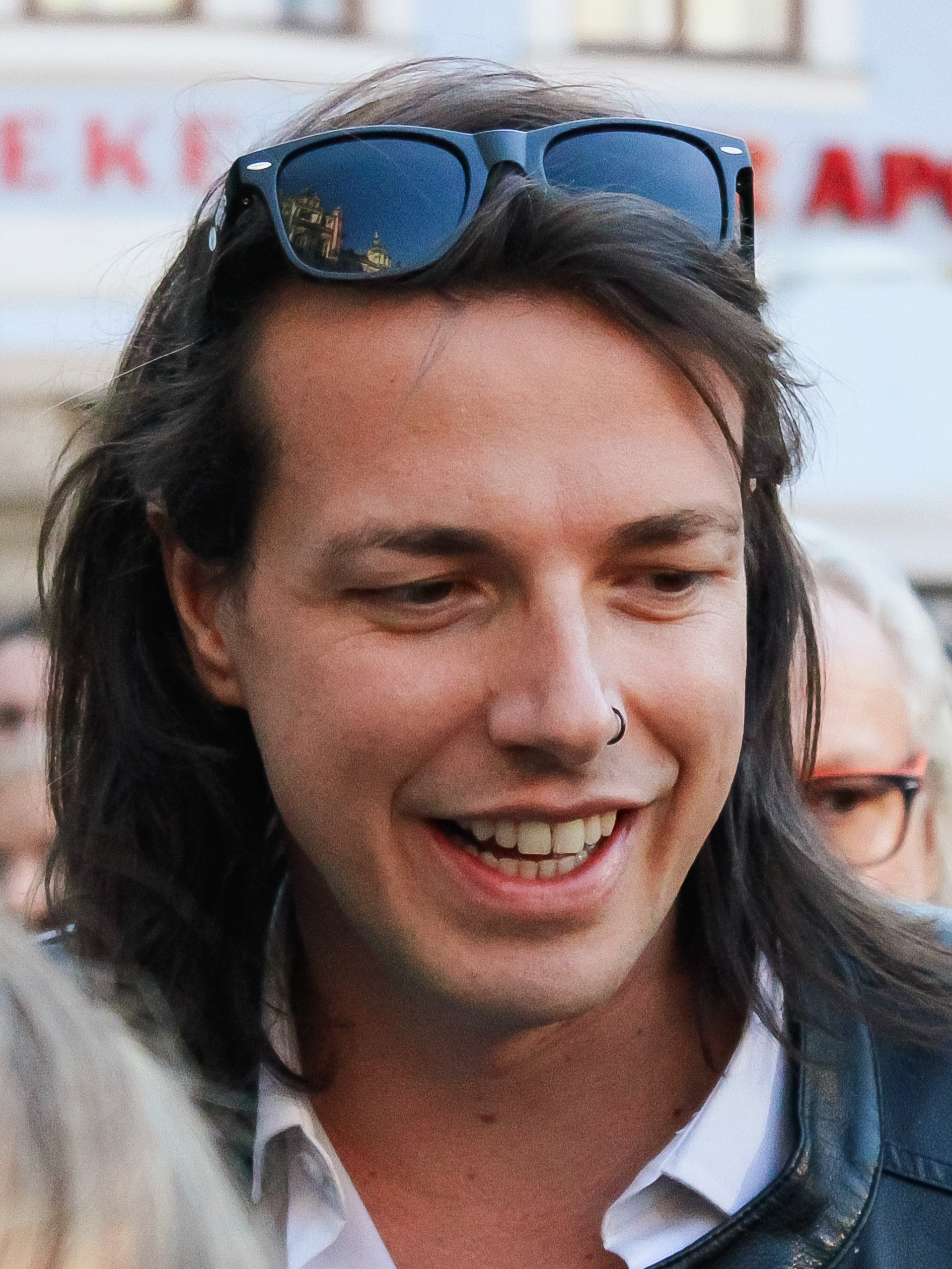

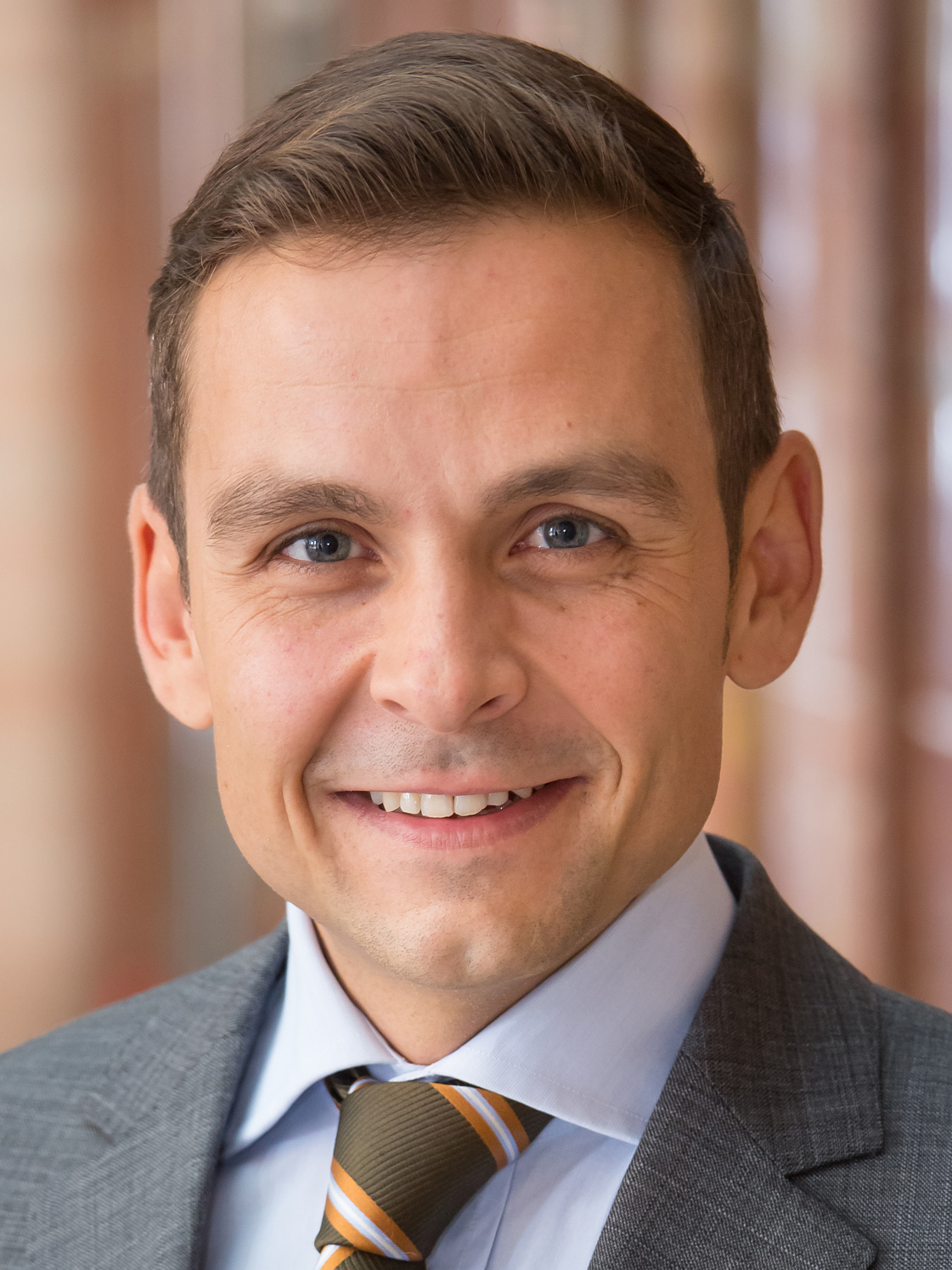
| Candidate | Alexander Van der Bellen | Walter Rosenkranz | Dominik Wlazny |
| Party | Independent (Greens) | FPÖ | BIER |
| Popular vote | 2,299,590 | 717,097 | 337,010 |
| Percentage | 56.69% | 17.68% | 8.31% |
| Candidate | Tassilo Wallentin | Gerald Grosz |
| Party | Independent | Independent |
| Popular vote | 327,214 | 225,942 |
| Percentage | 8.07% | 5.57% |
President before election
Alexander Van der Bellen
Greens
Elected President
Alexander Van der Bellen
Greens

Presidential elections were held in Austria on 9 October 2022. Incumbent Alexander Van der Bellen from the Greens was eligible for one more term and ran for re-election. About 6.36 million voting-age citizens were eligible to vote.

Final results showed that Van der Bellen was re-elected in the first round with 57% of the vote. Van der Bellen won in all of the 116 administrative districts of Austria. Carinthia was the only state in which he finished below 50% of the vote. Freedom Party of Austria (FPÖ) candidate Walter Rosenkranz placed second with 18% of the votes, far short of what his party colleague Norbert Hofer received in 2016. Three other right-wing candidates (Tassilo Wallentin, Gerald Grosz and Michael Brunner) tapped into the FPÖ voter pool and kept Rosenkranz below 20%. In third place – the best independent candidate without the backing of a parliamentary party – was artist, entrepreneur and medical doctor Dominik Wlazny ("Marco Pogo") from the Beer Party with 8% of the votes. In Vienna, Wlazny finished second behind Van der Bellen and ahead of Rosenkranz.

Had no candidate received a majority of valid votes cast, a runoff would have been held on 6 November.

== Electoral system ==
The President of Austria is directly elected for a six-year term by the two-round system; if no candidate receives more than 50% of valid votes cast in the first round, then a second ballot occurs in which only those two candidates who received the greatest number of votes in the first round may stand. The constitution grants the president the power to appoint the Chancellor and, by extension, federal cabinet ministers, Supreme Court justices, military officers, and most major bureaucrats. The president may dissolve the National Council. In practice, however, the president acts as a figurehead.

Austrian citizens who have reached the age of 16 by the end of the day of the election and who are not excluded from voting by a judicial conviction are entitled to vote. For the right to stand for election, the completion of the 35th year is required. As a prerequisite for running as a candidate for Federal President, at least 6.000 declarations of support (= valid signatures of eligible voters) must be submitted to the federal electoral authority set up at the Ministry of the Interior together with the formal candidate declaration. At the same time, a candidate fee of €3.600 must be paid. Potential candidates were able to start collecting and submitting signatures on 9 August 2022 ("Stichtag"). The last deadline for submission was the 37th day before the election day (2 September 2022) at 17:00. The Federal Election Commission at the Interior Ministry announced the official list of qualified candidates on 7 September 2022, after verification of the submitted signatures and other required documents.

== Date ==
Up until 2016, presidential elections were held during spring – but because the 2016 election runoff had to be repeated in December by Constitutional Court order, the date of the next election in 2022 was pushed back by about half a year as well. The exact date for the new election will be set by a joint parliamentary commission during spring/summer 2022 and the election must be held roughly three months after that date was set because of calendar reasons/deadlines. There is no definitive date as to when the election can take place in 2022, the only requirement is that the President-elect has to be sworn in by 26 January 2023. However, it has never happened that Austrian elections were scheduled for Christmas or New Year (or during summer school holidays between early July and mid-September), which means that – according to media consensus – it will definitely happen in 2022, most likely during the fall. On 26 June 2022, the Austrian government announced that 9 October 2022 was selected as election day, with a runoff on 6 November 2022 if needed.

== Candidates ==
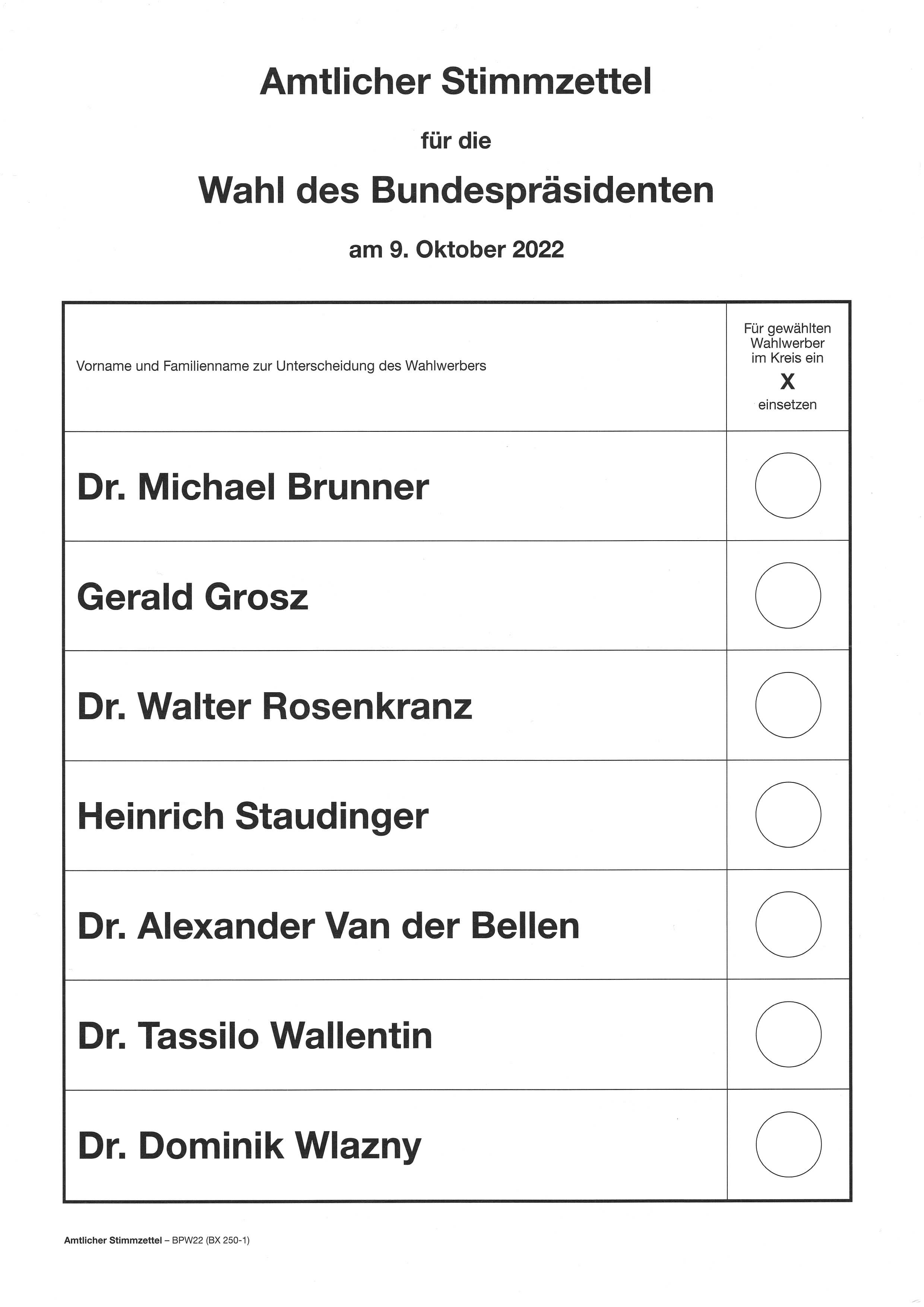
Ballot paper for the first round of voting

=== Candidates on the ballot ===
- Michael Brunner – lawyer, MFG party leader
- Gerald Grosz – TV commentator, businessman, author and former chairman of the BZÖ (2013–2015)
- Walter Rosenkranz – Ombudsman of the National Council, former FPÖ member of the National Council, former FPÖ group leader in the National Council, former leader of the Lower Austria FPÖ
- Heinrich Staudinger – business owner, shoe manufacturer
- Alexander Van der Bellen – President of Austria (2017–present), former party leader of The Greens (1997–2008)
- Tassilo Wallentin – lawyer, columnist and author
- Dominik Wlazny (alias Marco Pogo) – medical doctor and frontman of Turbobier, leader of the Beer Party (2014–present)
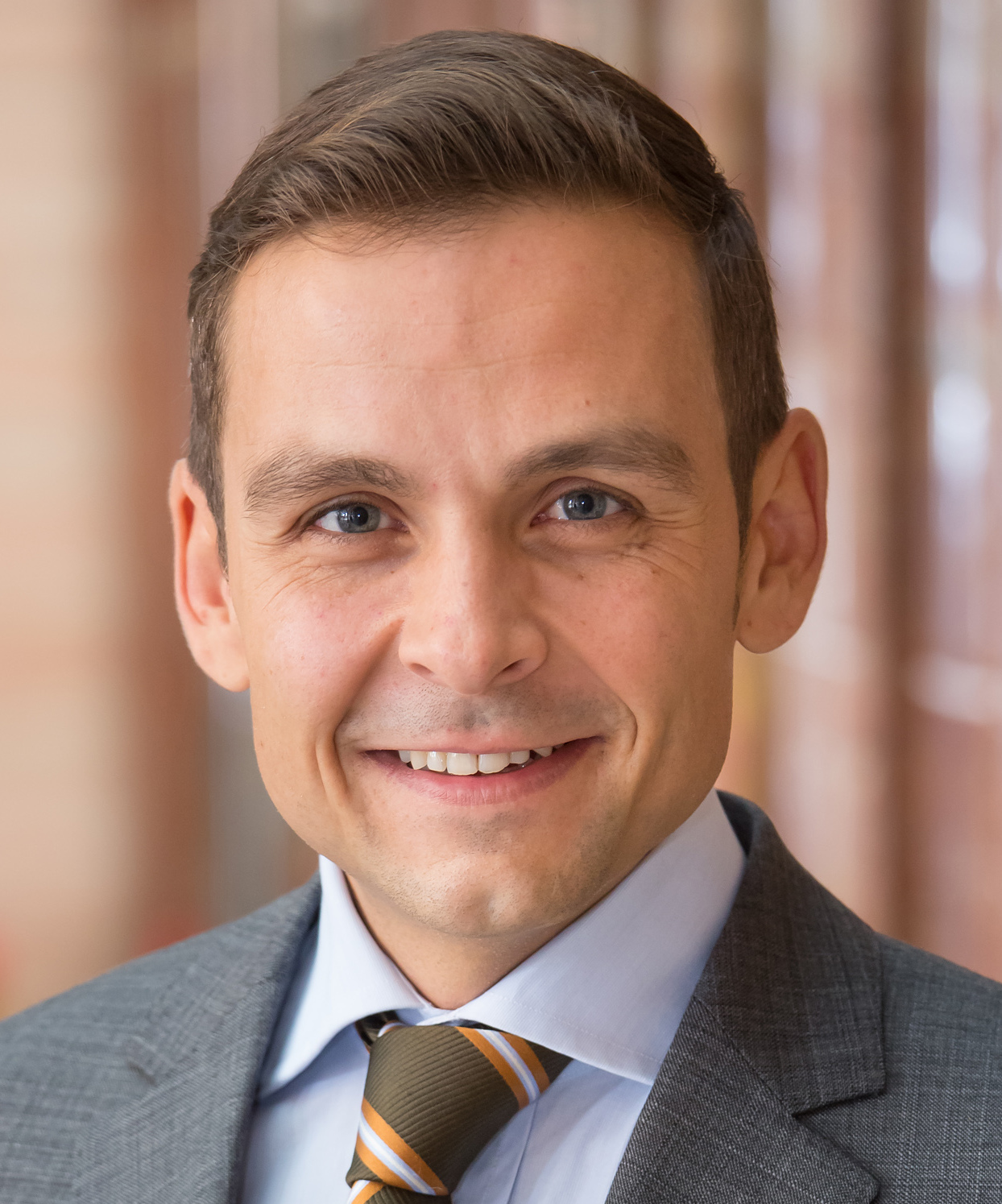
Gerald Grosz

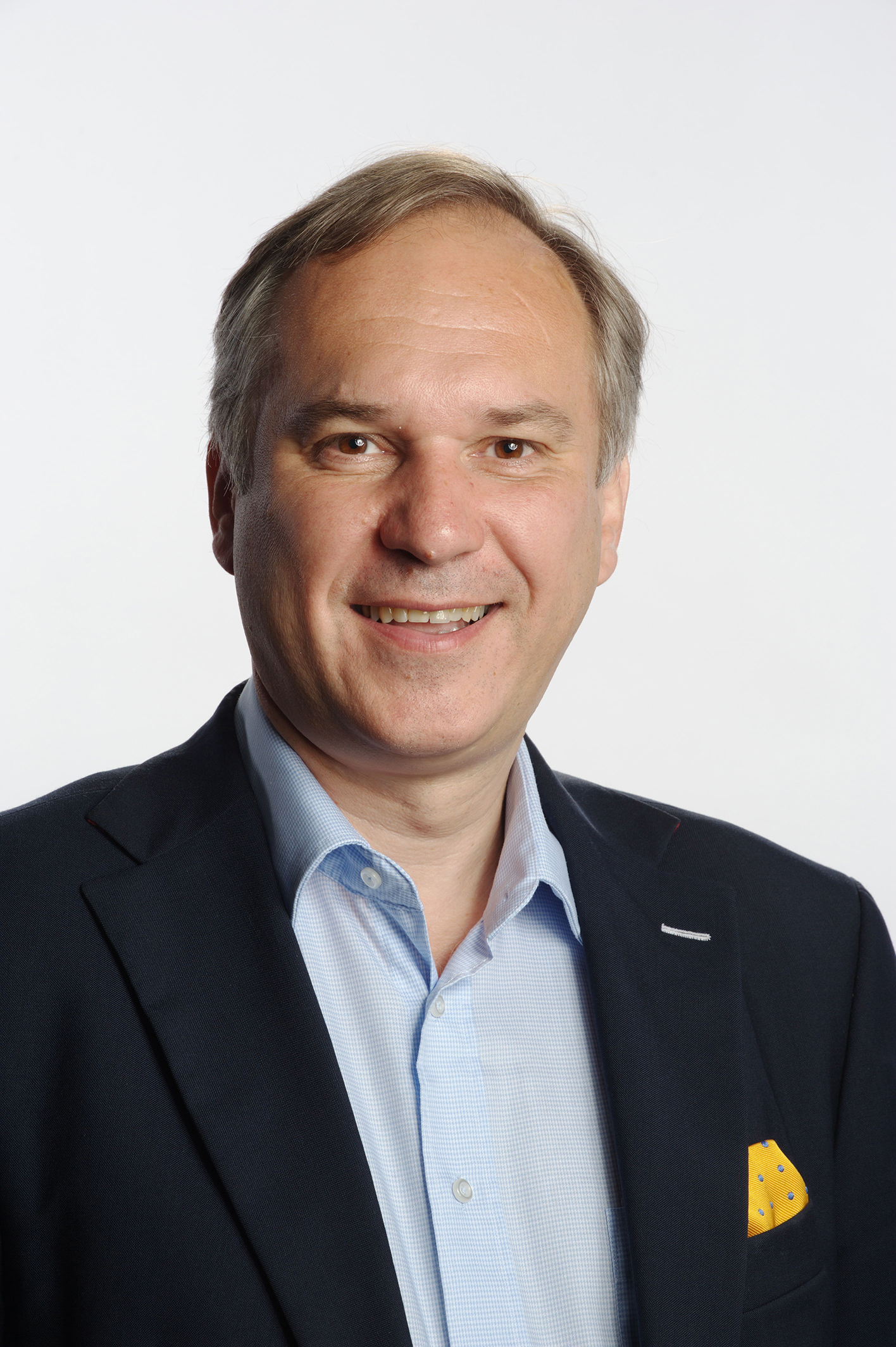
Walter Rosenkranz

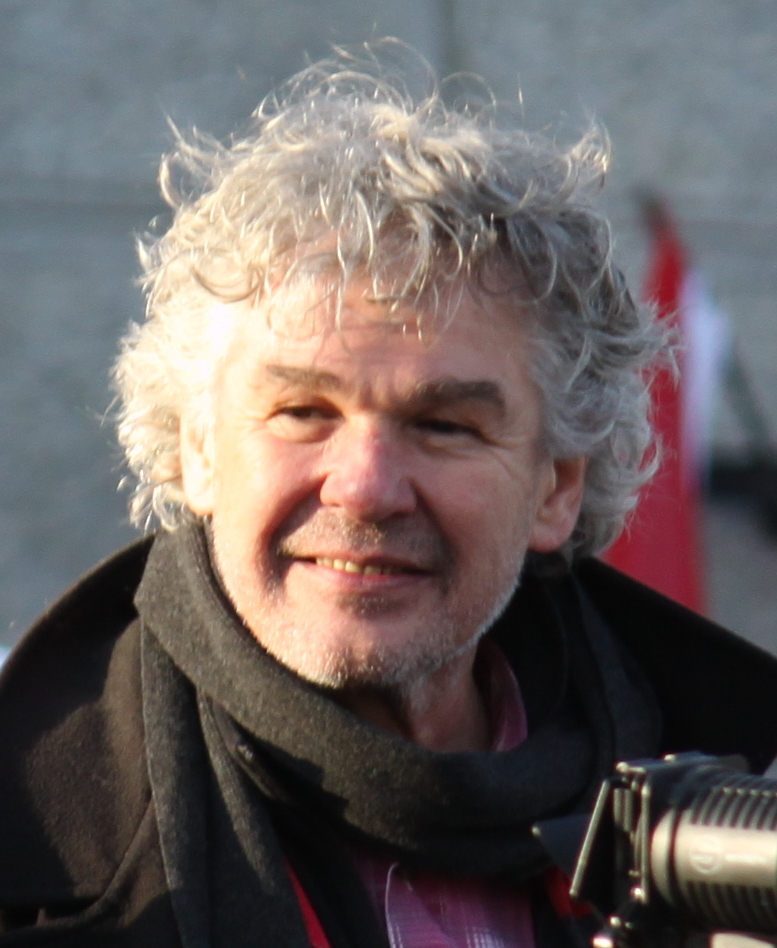
Heinrich Staudinger

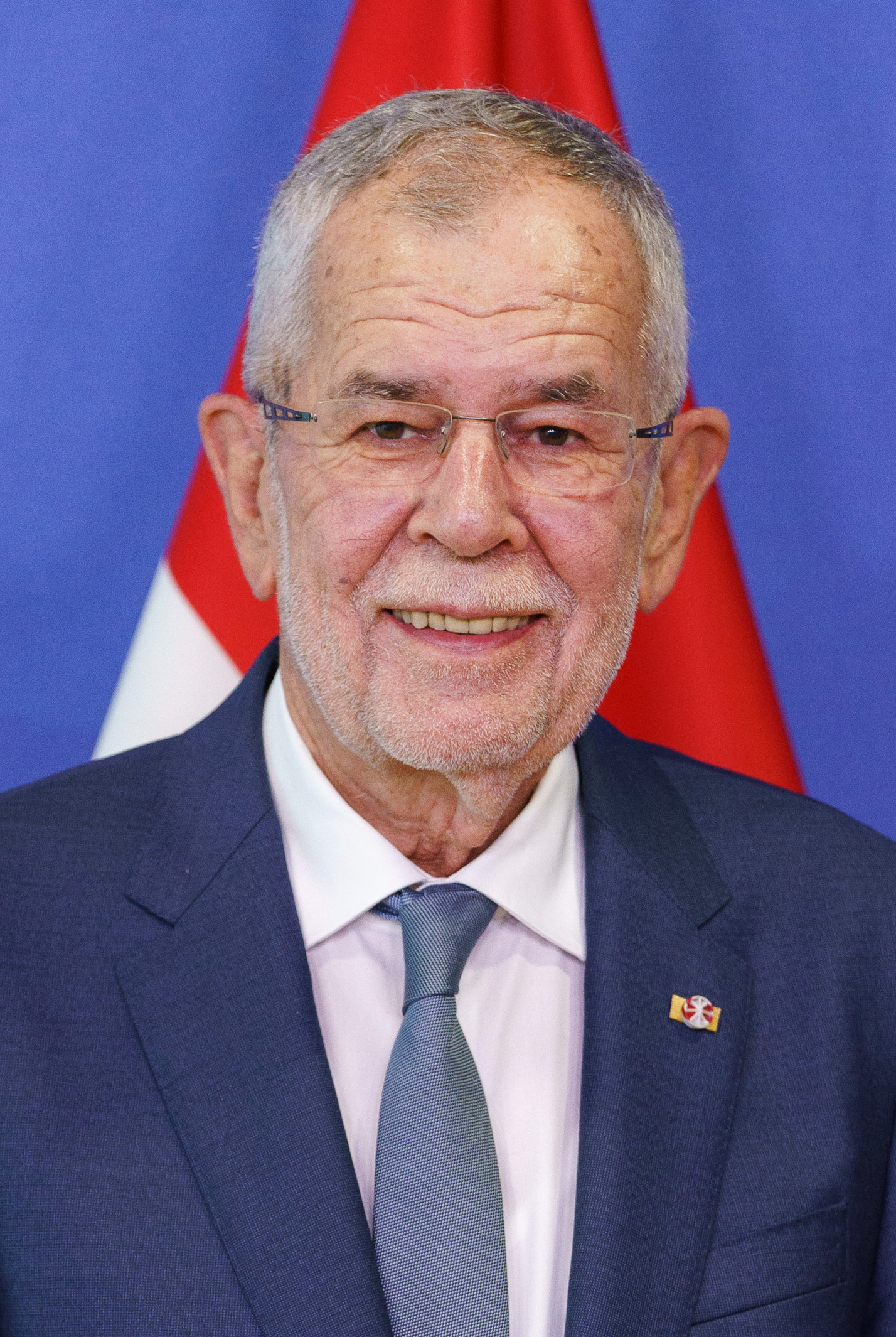
Alexander Van der Bellen

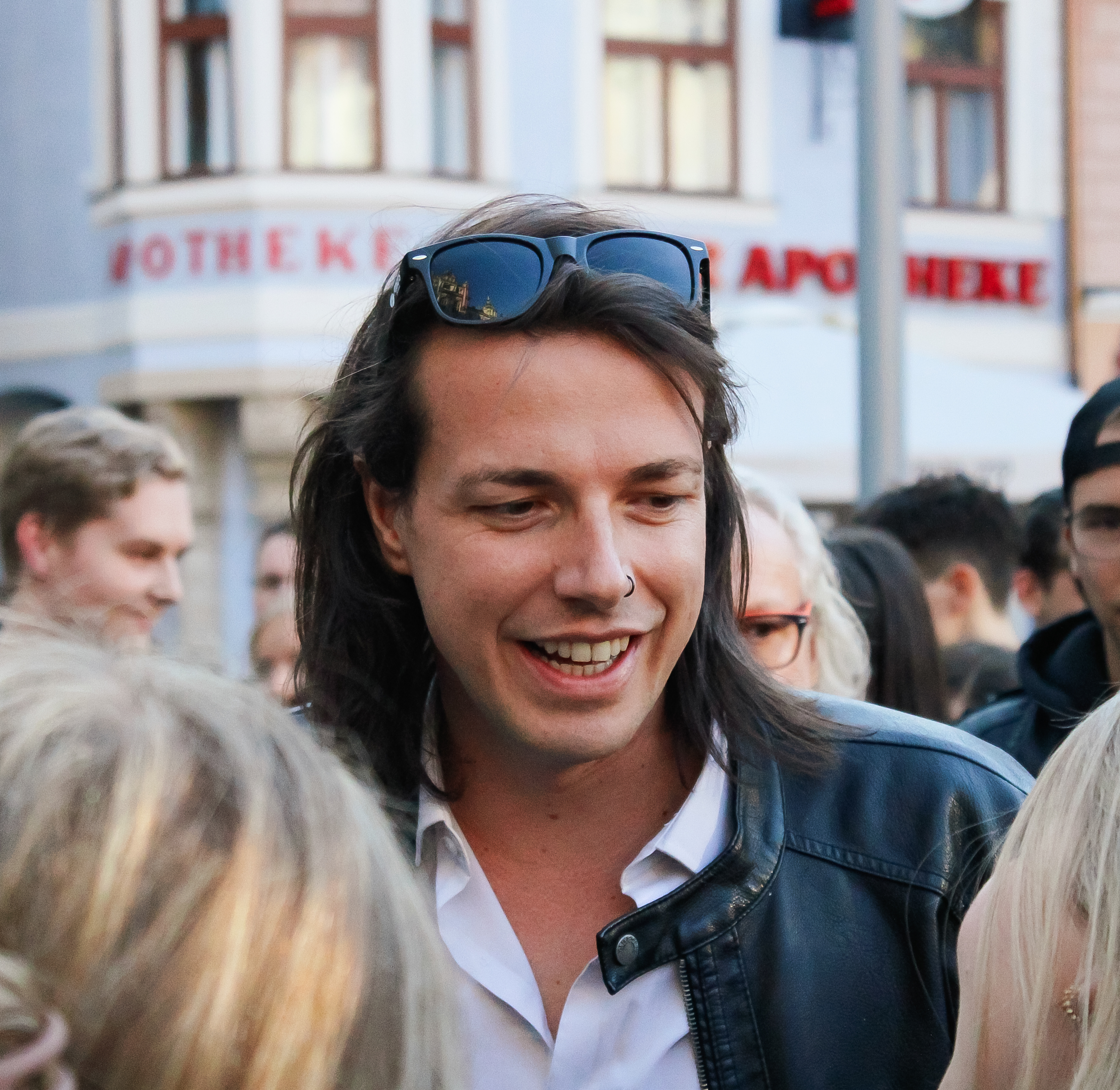
Dominik Wlazny (Marco Pogo)

=== Earlier candidate speculation ===
President of the National Council Wolfgang Sobotka of the ÖVP has ruled out running.

The SPÖ was previously undecided about whether they should run a candidate. In November 2020, federal chairwoman Pamela Rendi-Wagner stressed that a decision had not been made, but noted that the SPÖ has never challenged an incumbent president. She also ruled out running herself. Second President of the National Council Doris Bures and Mayor of Vienna Michael Ludwig both stated that the party should support Van der Bellen if he chooses to run for a second term. Tyrolean branch leader Georg Dornauer suggested that Bures herself should stand for election, even if Van der Bellen runs again.

Norbert Hofer of the Freedom Party of Austria (FPÖ), who was runner-up to Van der Bellen in 2016, has made conflicting statements about his intention to seek the presidency for a second time. In 2018, he stated that he plans to run in 2022. In 2020, he stated that he would not run if Van der Bellen sought re-election, but that he would if Rudolf Anschober was the Greens nominee. Anschober himself subsequently ruled out running. In February 2021, Hofer said it was "not unlikely" that he would run, and that he would make the decision a year in advance of the election. After Hofer's resignation as party leader in June, he stated he was unsure whether he would run for president. His successor Herbert Kickl voiced his confidence that Hofer would still run, however. On 13 May 2022, Hofer declared that he would not run for president in the election.

== Campaign ==
=== Early campaign ===
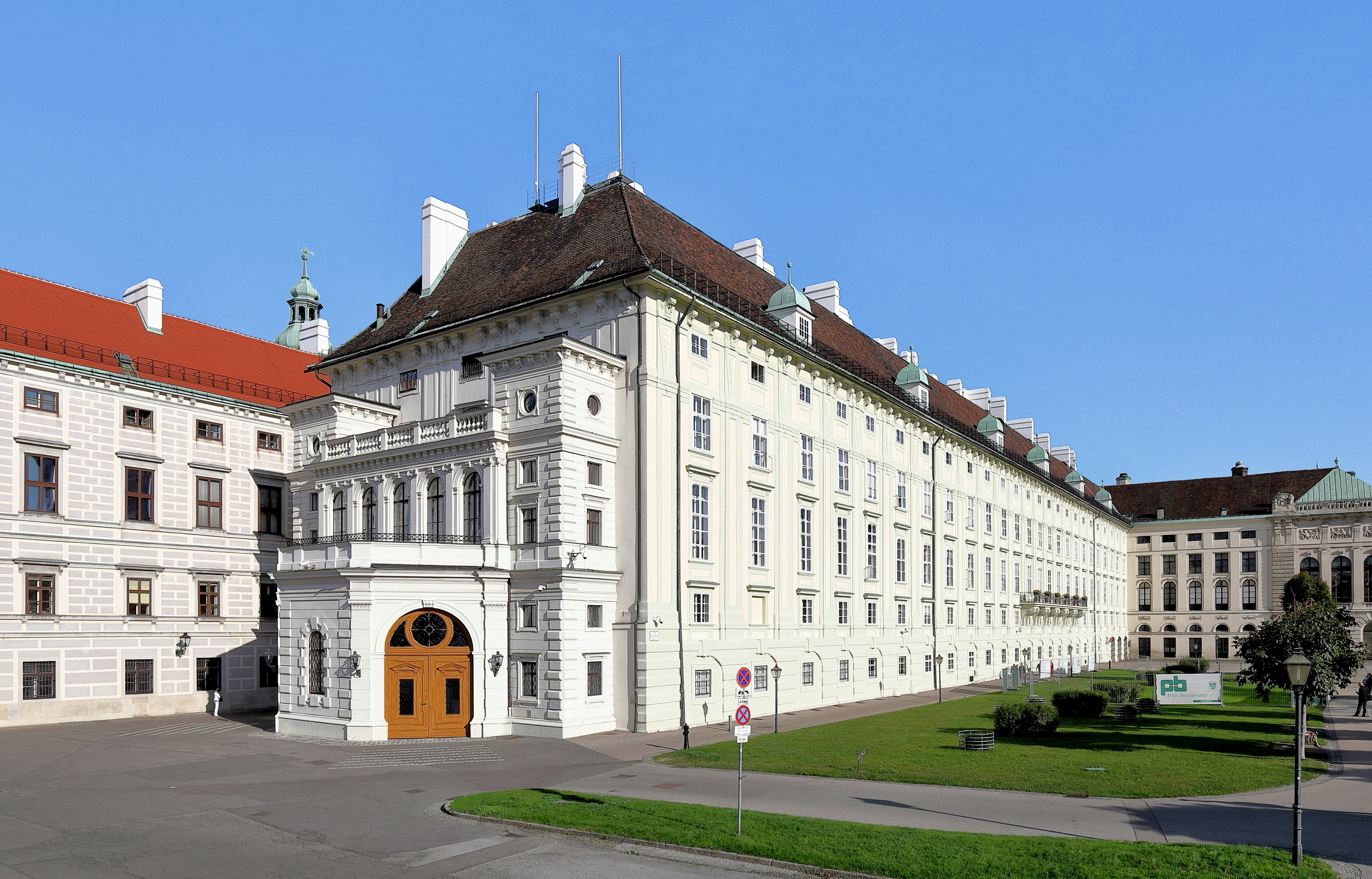
The official residence of the Austrian President since 1946: The Leopoldine Wing of the Hofburg in Vienna.

On 22 May 2022, President Alexander Van der Bellen announced his candidacy for re-election. Opinion polls indicate high approval ratings for President Van der Bellen. A May 2022 survey showed that 63% of voters are satisfied or very satisfied with Van der Bellen's presidency. Another poll at the end of May had his approval rating at 59%, with 34% disapproving.

The two major parties, the Austrian People's Party (ÖVP) and the Social Democratic Party of Austria (SPÖ), traditionally refrain from challenging a popular incumbent president if they choose to seek re-election. Following President Van der Bellen's announcement to run for re-election on 22 May 2022, the SPÖ announced that they will not run a candidate against him, instead they will actively endorse and support his campaign for re-election.

On 23 May 2022, the governing party ÖVP announced that they will not run a candidate on their own but did not endorse the candidacy of Van der Bellen for re-election, instead wishing him "all the best". The Governor of Tyrol, Günther Platter, endorsed Van der Bellen.

NEOS – The New Austria and Liberal Forum also announced on 22 May 2022 that they are endorsing and supporting Van der Bellen in his re-election effort.

The Greens – The Green Alternative, of which Van der Bellen was a long-time leader, also endorsed Van der Bellen after his announcement to run for re-election. While both the SPÖ and NEOS did not support Van der Bellen financially, the Green Party did so with at least €500,000 in campaign money.

The opposition Freedom Party of Austria announced at an early stage that they will definitely run a candidate against Van der Bellen, while the new party MFG Austria – People Freedom Fundamental Rights said they are thinking about a candidacy against him. In June 2022, MFG party leader Michael Brunner announced his candidacy for president.

=== Intensive campaign period ===
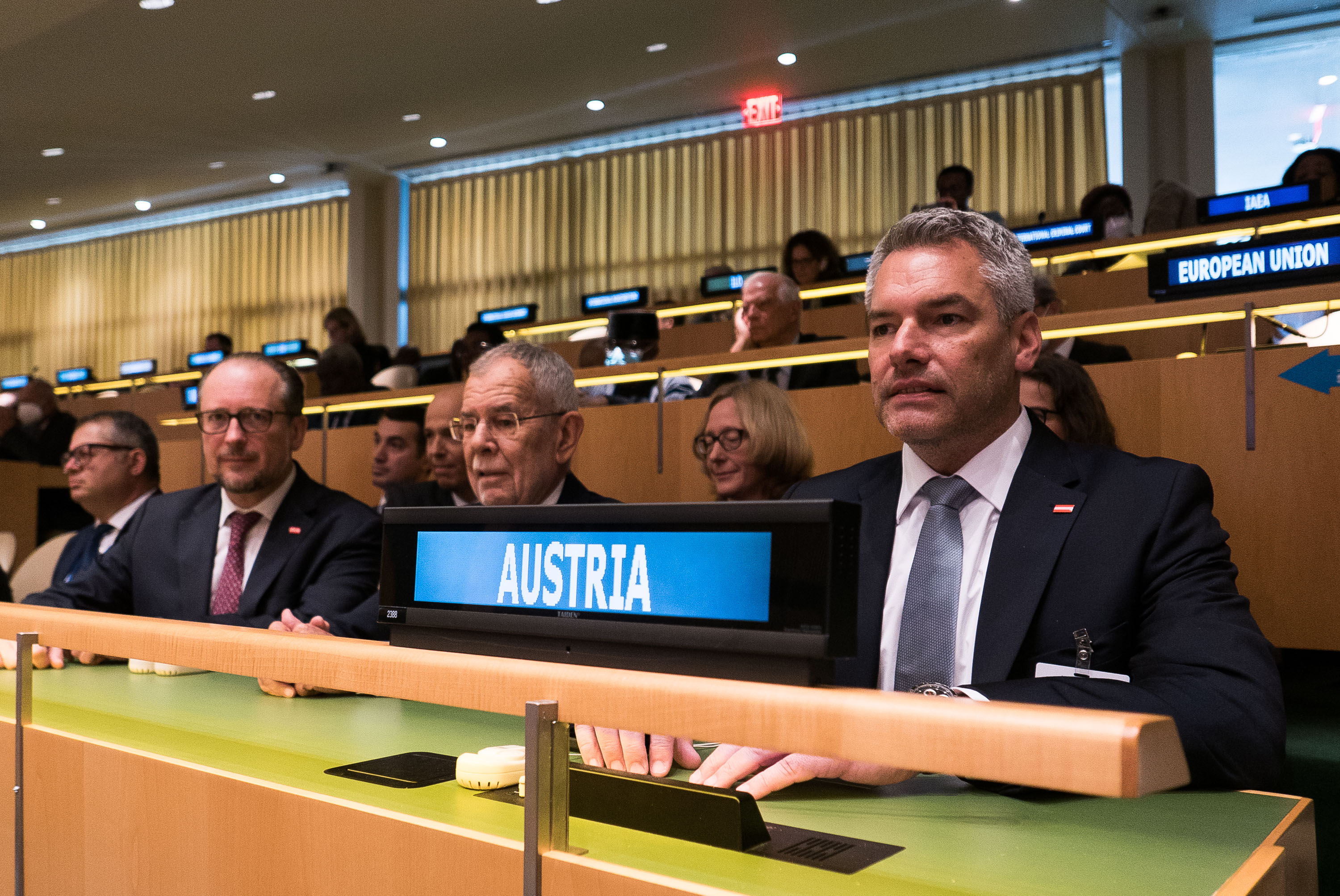
President Alexander Van der Bellen at the United Nations in New York City on 20 September 2022, together with Austrian Chancellor Karl Nehammer and Austrian Foreign Minister Alexander Schallenberg

After the announcement of the seven official candidates on 7 September, the intensive campaign period started. President Alexander Van der Bellen (Green Party) decided not to participate in any TV debates with his challengers, citing that the "integrity of the office should not be harmed" and "his predecessors as President who ran for re-election also did not participate in TV debates". Some of Van der Bellen's opponents, such as Walter Rosenkranz (FPÖ) and Gerald Grosz (Independent, ex-FPÖ, ex-BZÖ) attacked him for his refusal to debate them and called him a "coward".

President Van der Bellen instead focused on a billboard and Social Media campaign with slogans such as "The safe choice during stormy times." or "We are stronger together." or "You don't gamble with Austria." The President also used meetings with international leaders and visits to international organizations such as the United Nations in New York City to increase his profile ahead of the election and to appear statesmanlike.

Walter Rosenkranz also ran several billboard and Social Media campaigns with slogans like "Let's take back our freedoms." or "Uncompromisingly for Austria." or "Serving in the interest of the people, not the elites and powerful." The FPÖ also repeatedly mocked President Van der Bellen as "Van der Biden".

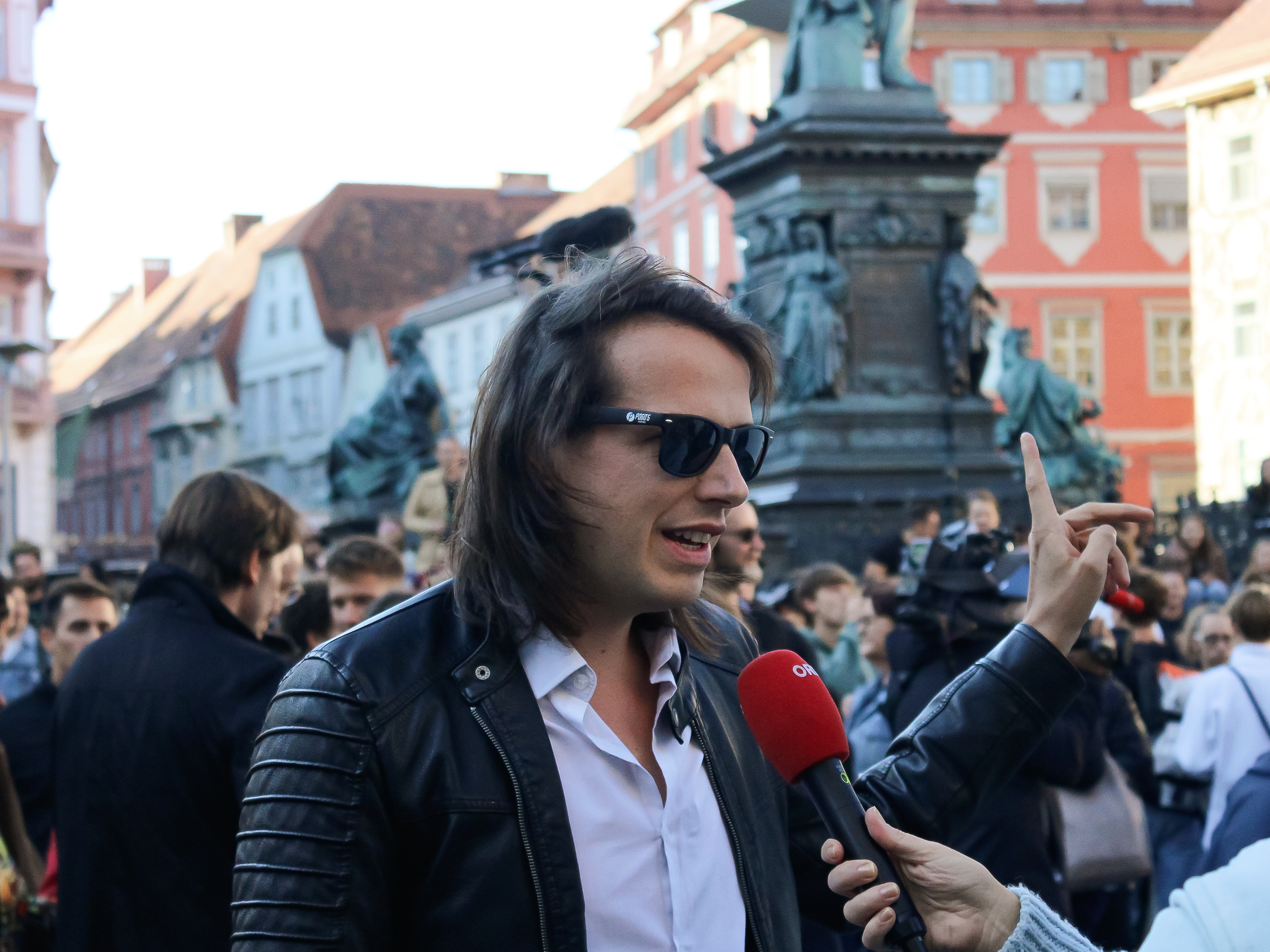
Dominik Wlazny (alias Marco Pogo) campaigning in Graz on 23 September 2022

Dominik Wlazny (alias Marco Pogo) from the Beer Party launched a Social Media parody ad, mocking the campaign team of Alexander Van der Bellen, insinuating that the Van der Bellen camp is "afraid of Wlazny and his proposals." Later, Wlazny launched several billboards in which he prioritizes the fight against child poverty, violence against women, better pay for women, a rise in pensions, more renewable energy, better animal rights protection and a mandatory skills test for new cabinet members.

Gerald Grosz portrayed himself as a Donald Trump-style presidential candidate, wearing a red MAGA hat ("Make Austria Grosz Again"), with his last name Grosz resembling the German word "groß" for "great". Grosz attacked Van der Bellen and the Austrian ÖVP-Green government repeatedly for various failures on the Russian invasion of Ukraine, the rising inflation and electricity prices etc. His main priority if elected President would be to dismiss the current Austrian government immediately, install a new cabinet of his own thinking, who would then call new parliamentary elections. His main campaign slogan is "Vote for Gerald Grosz and you get rid of Van der Bellen and the current government."

Like Rosenkranz and Grosz, Tassilo Wallentin and Michael Brunner also hail from the radical right. In his editorials for the Kronen Zeitung before becoming an official candidate, Wallentin repeatedly wrote that immigration in general and requests for asylum must be limited to zero, especially from Muslim-majority countries and warned that Muslims will be close to a majority in Austria in 20 years.

Brunner repeatedly warned of vaccination damages from COVID-19 vaccines and attacked the government on their policies during the pandemic. With the COVID-19 pandemic decreasing as a major topic during the campaign for president, Brunner followed the other candidates in focusing on rising inflation, electricity and gas prices. He said he favours the elimination of EU sanctions against Russia ("They are not working and harm the Austrian population.") and the full implementation of Neutrality in Austria again, which in his opinion is currently not the case. He would also immediately dismiss the current Austrian government if elected president.

Heinrich Staudinger calls for poverty reduction, pacifism and the decrease in military spending and the focus of the military on disaster aid rather than engaging in conflicts. He strongly opposes increasing military spending to 2-3% of GDP like candidates Grosz and Rosenkranz. He strongly advocates help for immigrants and asylum seekers (his shoe manufacturing company employs numerous immigrants) and supports regional production methods with natural products and in line with the environment. He strongly supports measures to protect the environment and climate. He was vaccination-sceptic during the Covid pandemic. As President, he would make his first official state trip to the Democratic Republic of Congo.

== Opinion polls ==
| Polling firm | Fieldwork date | Sample size | | | | | | | | Lead |
| Polling firm | Fieldwork date | Sample size | Van der Bellen Greens | Rosenkranz FPÖ | Wlazny BIER | Wallentin Indep. | Grosz Indep. | Brunner MFG | Staudinger Indep. | Lead |
|---|---|---|---|---|---|---|---|---|---|---|
| INSA / eXXpress | 4–6 Oct 2022 | 1000 | 48.5 | 14.5 | 12.5 | 9 | 9 | 3 | 3.5 | 34 |
| OGM / Kurier | 23–28 Sep 2022 | 1702 | 58 | 16 | 8 | 9 | 5 | 3 | 1 | 42 |
| Market-Lazarsfeld / ÖSTERREICH | 26–27 Sep 2022 | 1000 | 56 | 16 | 9 | 8 | 6 | 3 | 2 | 40 |
| Market-Lazarsfeld / ÖSTERREICH | 19–20 Sep 2022 | 1000 | 51 | 16 | 12 | 9 | 7 | 4 | 1 | 35 |
| Unique Research / Profil / Heute | 7–15 Sep 2022 | 1600 | 59 | 13 | 7 | 8 | 9 | 2 | 2 | 46 |
| Market-Lazarsfeld / ÖSTERREICH | 12–13 Sep 2022 | 1000 | 51 | 14 | 13 | 9 | 7 | 5 | 1 | 37 |
| Market-Lazarsfeld / ÖSTERREICH | 5–6 Sep 2022 | 1000 | 45 | 18 | 14 | 10 | 6 | 4 | 3 | 27 |

Polling released before the announcement of official candidates on 7 September 2022

| Polling firm | Fieldwork date | Sample size | | | | | | | Others | Lead |
| Polling firm | Fieldwork date | Sample size | Van der Bellen Greens | Rosenkranz FPÖ | Grosz Indep. | Wlazny BIER | Brunner MFG | Wallentin Indep. | Others | Lead |
|---|---|---|---|---|---|---|---|---|---|---|
| Market-Lazarsfeld / ÖSTERREICH | 29–30 Aug 2022 | 1000 | 50 | 18 | 7 | 10 | 4 | 11 | – | 32 |
| Market-Lazarsfeld / ÖSTERREICH | 22–23 Aug 2022 | 1000 | 53 | 14 | 8 | 10 | 4 | 11 | – | 39 |
| Unique Research / Profil / ATV | 10–18 Aug 2022 | 1615 | 66 | 13 | 6 | 5 | 3 | 6 | 1 | 53 |
| Market-Lazarsfeld / ÖSTERREICH | 16–17 Aug 2022 | 1000 | 58 | 11 | 7 | 9 | 6 | 9 | – | 47 |
| Market-Lazarsfeld / ÖSTERREICH | 1–2 Aug 2022 | 1000 | 59 | 18 | 10 | 9 | 4 | – | – | 41 |
| Market-Lazarsfeld / ÖSTERREICH | 25–27 Jul 2022 | 1000 | 58 | 22 | 7 | 10 | 3 | – | – | 36 |
| Market-Lazarsfeld / ÖSTERREICH | 18–20 Jul 2022 | 1000 | 54 | 24 | 9 | 10 | 3 | – | – | 30 |
| OGM / Kurier | 12–14 Jul 2022 | 812 | 63 | 21 | 6 | 5 | 5 | – | – | 42 |

Hypothetical polling

| Polling firm | Fieldwork date | Sample size | | | | | | | | | Others/ None/ Undecided | Lead |
| Polling firm | Fieldwork date | Sample size | Van der Bellen Greens | Hofer FPÖ | Fürst FPÖ | Kickl FPÖ | Wallentin Indep./FPÖ | Grosz Indep. | Wlazny BIER | Brunner MFG | Others/ None/ Undecided | Lead |
|---|---|---|---|---|---|---|---|---|---|---|---|---|
| Market-Lazarsfeld / ÖSTERREICH | 4–6 Jul 2022 | 1000 | 40 | – | – | – | 10 | 9 | 7 | 2 | 29 | 30 |
| Market-Lazarsfeld / ÖSTERREICH | 4–6 Jul 2022 | 1000 | 41 | – | 8 | – | – | 10 | 6 | 2 | 30 | 31 |
| Market-Lazarsfeld / ÖSTERREICH | 27–28 Jun 2022 | 1000 | 42 | – | – | – | 8 | 8 | 6 | 4 | 29 | 34 |
| Market-Lazarsfeld / ÖSTERREICH | 13–14 Jun 2022 | 1000 | 43 | – | – | – | 9 | 10 | 6 | – | 33 | 33 |
| Market-Lazarsfeld / ÖSTERREICH | 13–14 Jun 2022 | 1000 | 45 | – | 8 | – | – | 8 | 8 | – | 32 | 37 |
| Market-Lazarsfeld / ÖSTERREICH | 7–8 Jun 2022 | 1000 | 42 | – | 9 | – | – | 7 | 8 | – | 34 | 33 |
| Unique Research / Profil | 23–25 May 2022 | 500 | 46 | – | – | – | – | – | – | – | 23 (+31 Undecided) | 23 |
| Market / Der Standard | 23–25 May 2022 | 1000 | 56 | – | – | – | – | – | – | – | 27 (+17 Undecided) | 29 |
| Market-Lazarsfeld / ÖSTERREICH | 23–24 May 2022 | 1000 | 45 | – | – | 9 | – | 7 | 6 | – | 4 (+29 Undecided) | 36 |
| Market-Lazarsfeld / ÖSTERREICH | 16–19 May 2022 | 2000 | 42 | – | – | 9 | – | 9 | 4 | – | 7 (+29 Undecided) | 33 |
| IFDD / Puls 24 | 30 Apr–4 May 2022 | 1000 | 64 | – | 11 | – | – | 12.5 | 12.5 | – | – | 51.5 |
| IFDD / Puls 24 | 30 Apr–4 May 2022 | 1000 | 67 | – | – | – | – | 19 | 14 | – | – | 45 |
| Market / Der Standard | 23–28 Dec 2021 | 800 | 51 | – | – | – | – | – | – | – | 33 (+16 Undecided) | 18 |
| Hajek / ATV | 6 Dec 2020 | 814 | 50 | 17 | – | – | – | – | – | – | 33 | 33 |

== Number of eligible voters ==
According to the Ministry of the Interior, 6,363,336 citizens are entitled to vote – 61,113 of them residing abroad. Compared to the first ballot in 2016, the number of those entitled to vote has fallen slightly (6,382,507 – 42,830 of whom reside abroad). After the end of the objection period and the correction process, the final number of eligible voters was published on 7 October.

== Number of absentee ballots issued ==
After the official candidates were announced on 7 September, the official ballot papers were printed. The requested absentee ballots were sent out by the municipalities from 13 September. The last possible date for the written application for an absentee ballot being 5 October, while the last possible date for a personal application and collection at voters' main place of residence was 7 October.

The number of absentee ballots issued was announced on the evening of 7 October, with 958,136 absentee ballots issued – 60,264 of them to eligible voters living abroad. Accordingly, 15.1% of those entitled to vote applied for an absentee ballot. In comparison, a total of 641,975 absentee ballots were issued before the first ballot in 2016 – 39,079 of them to eligible voters living abroad. Compared to this year, 10.1% of those entitled to vote applied for an absentee ballot ahead of the first ballot in 2016.

Absentee ballots have to be received by the district election commissions on election day, no later than poll closing time (17:00), to be counted. The Austrian Post offered a one-time special emptying of all public mailboxes in Austria on Saturday at 09:00 so that the absentee ballots could be delivered on time by Sunday. Absentee ballots will be counted on 10 October.

== Results ==
Winners by city/town/municipality. Green: Van der Bellen, Blue: Rosenkranz

| Candidate | Party | Votes | % |
|---|---|---|---|
| Alexander Van der Bellen | Independent (The Greens) | 2,299,590 | 56.69 |
| Walter Rosenkranz | Freedom Party of Austria | 717,097 | 17.68 |
| Dominik Wlazny | The Beer Party | 337,010 | 8.31 |
| Tassilo Wallentin | Independent | 327,214 | 8.07 |
| Gerald Grosz | Independent | 225,942 | 5.57 |
| Michael Brunner | MFG Austria | 85,465 | 2.11 |
| Heinrich Staudinger | Independent | 64,411 | 1.59 |
| Total | | 4,056,729 | 100.00 |
| Valid votes | | 4,056,729 | 97.80 |
| Invalid/blank votes | | 91,353 | 2.20 |
| Total votes | | 4,148,082 | 100.00 |
| Registered voters/turnout | | 6,363,336 | 65.19 |
Source: Ministry of the Interior

The results were certified and made official by the Interior Ministry on 17 October 2022.
