= Marco Pogo =

Austrian artist (born 1986)

Dominik Wlazny
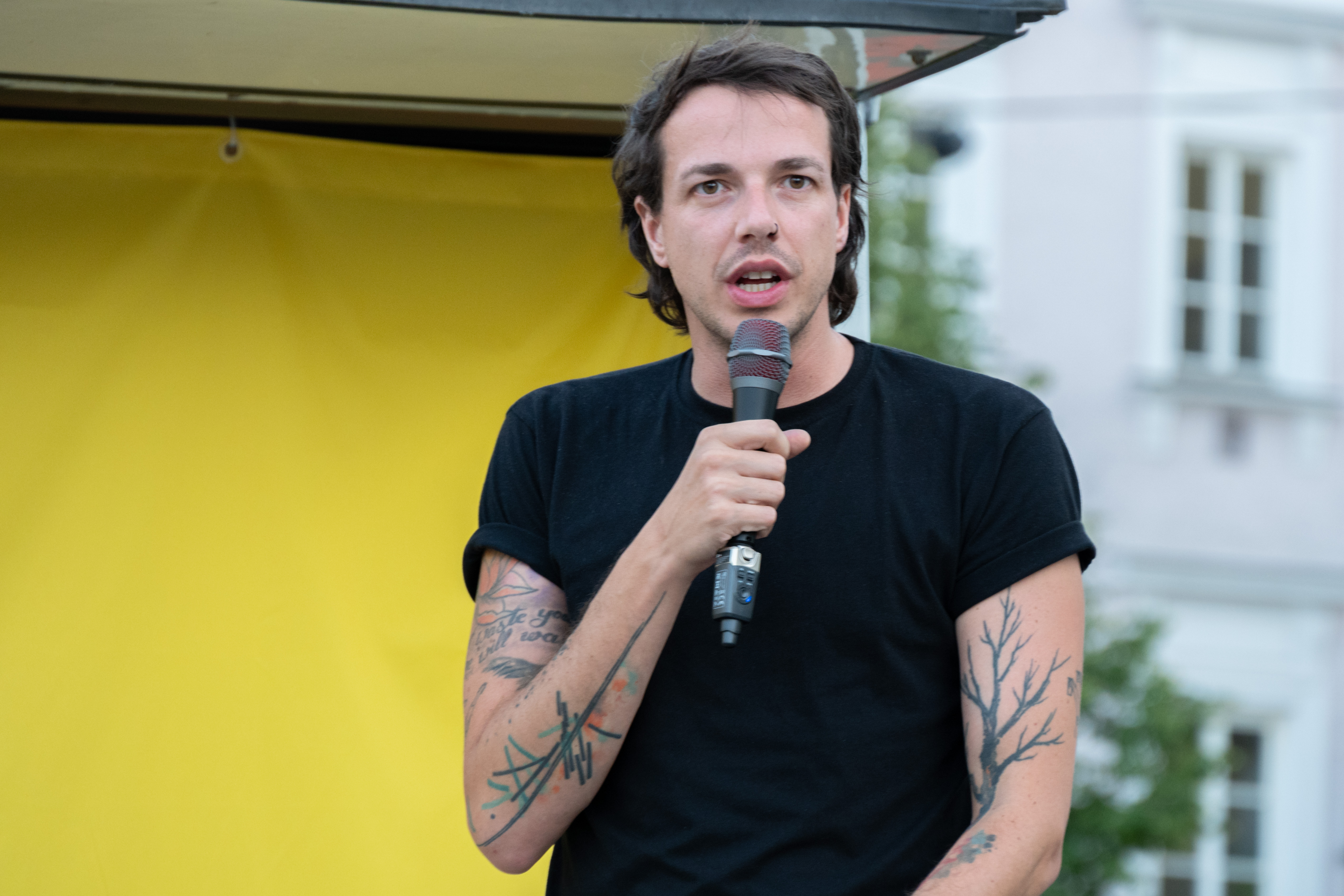
- Dominik Wlazny in Linz (2024)

Background information
- Also known as: Marco Pogo
- Born: Dominik Wlazny; 27 December 1986 (age 39); Vienna, Austria
- Genre: Punk rock
- Years active: 2002–present
- Label: Pogo's Empire
- Member of: Turbobier
- Website: marcopogo.com

Dominik Wlazny (born 27 December 1986), known by his stage name Marco Pogo, is an Austrian musician, physician, Kabarett artist, and politician. He is the founder and leader of the Austrian Beer Party, a minor satirical political party. He was a candidate for President of Austria in the 2022 election and the Beer Party's lead candidate in the 2024 Austrian legislative election.

== Life ==
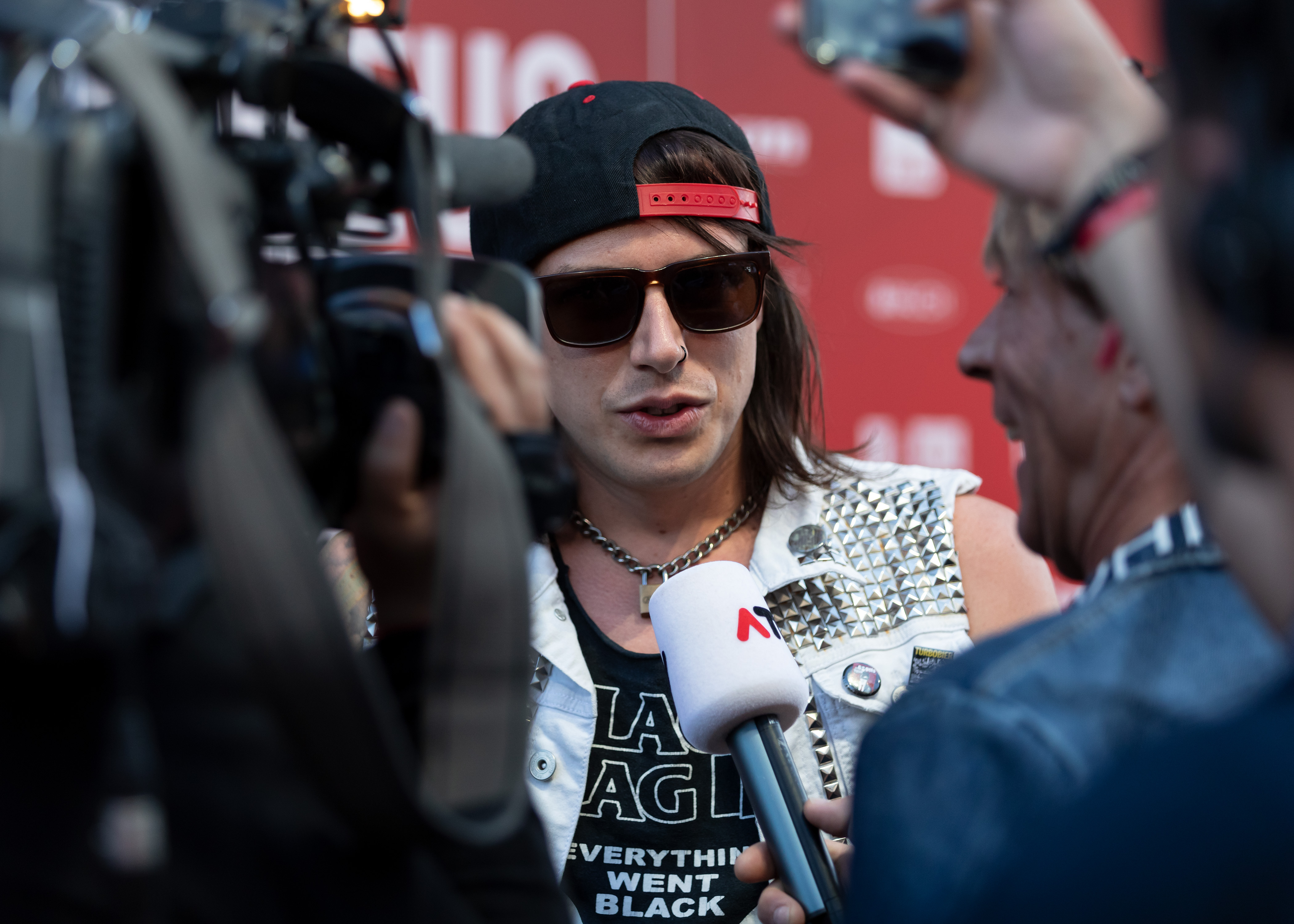
Wlazny at the Amadeus Austrian Music Awards 2019

Wlazny was born in Vienna in 1986. He played guitar from childhood and began making music professionally at the age of 16. In 2003 he became vocalist and bassist for The Gogets and adopted his stage name, Marco Pogo. In 2005, he graduated from secondary school in Hollabrunn and began studying medicine at the Medical University of Vienna. He completed his thesis in 2012 on the effectiveness and tolerability of azithromycin.

Since 2014, Wlazny has been the frontman of the punk rock band Turbobier. After achieving success with the band, he decided to turn to music full-time. They have topped the Austrian album charts and won the Amadeus Austrian Music Award in 2016 and 2022. In 2016, Wlazny founded the independent label Pogo's Empire.

As a doctor, Wlazny has been vocal in his support for measures to counter the COVID-19 pandemic. Prior to a Turbobier concert in August 2021, he administered vaccinations against COVID-19 to thirty people at the venue.

Wlazny published the book Stories (Gschichtn) in October 2021, recounting stories and anecdotes from his life.

== Political career ==
Wlazny founded the Beer Party of Austria in 2014. This coincided with the release of the song Die Bierpartei on Turbobier's debut album. The party first contested elections in 2019, running a list in Vienna for the 2019 Austrian legislative election. Wlazny was the party's lead candidate; they won just under 5,000 votes and did not earn any seats. The party ran again in the 2020 Viennese state election and, although they fell short of winning seats in the city council with 1.8% of the vote, the party won eleven seats on various district councils. Wlazny was again lead candidate, was elected to the Simmering council. Wlazny has gained attention for his political stunts and media appearances. In elections, he runs under his real name.

=== 2022 presidential election ===
Wlazny announced in late 2021 that he would run in the 2022 Austrian presidential election. Two months prior to the election on 19 August, he announced he had gathered the 6,000 signatures necessary to run, the first candidate to do so. At 35 years and 10 months, he became the youngest-ever candidate for President of Austria; the minimum age to run is 35 years.

Compared to previous campaigns, Wlazny's presidential bid was characterised as serious and professional. He proposed a new competency-based assessment process for federal ministers and the establishment of a "future ministry" to ensure long-term planning "beyond the next election date". He called for more expert consultation and accountability in government, and for media literacy courses to be introduced to the school curriculum. He suggested that the president should act as more of a moral guide and spoke of the need for greater action in regards to inflation, healthcare, renewable energy, refugees, and education.

Wlazny won 337,010 votes in the election, a total of 8.31%, placing third. He was the second-most popular candidate in Vienna with 10.7%, behind re-elected incumbent Alexander Van der Bellen.
