= Tassilo Wallentin =

Tassilo Wallentin (born 25 December 1973 in Vienna) is an Austrian author, columnist, and lawyer. He was an independent candidate for President of Austria in the 2022 election.

== Life and profession ==
Wallentin graduated from Catholic school in Floridsdorf in Vienna. He then completed compulsory military service as a one-year volunteer with the alpine troops and began studying jurisprudence at the University of Salzburg in 1994. He completed his doctoral studies in 1998 and worked as a university assistant at the Institute for Austrian and International Commercial and Economic Law. He then studied in the United States, obtaining a Master of Laws degree and worked for a law firm in San Francisco. After returning to Austria, practicing law in Vienna, and passing the bar exam, Wallentin founded his own law firm in 2004.

Wallentin rose to prominence in 2004 after securing the acquittal of two construction industry directors who had operated hundreds of shell companies. In his defence, he cited a decision by the Supreme Court of Justice which ruled that intentional withdrawal of share capital from a company was not illegal since the funds were transferred, if only for a "legal second", to the founding account. Wallentin successfully argued that the defendants had not technically filed false reports to the commercial court, since the state of the accounts during that "legal second" was legally valid. Combined with a 1999 European Court of Justice ruling on the freedom to establish companies across borders, the case set an EU-wide legal precedent that companies are only liable for damages up to the basic founding fee of 100 euro, necessitating amendment to regulations to re-criminalise corporate fraud.

Shortly after, Wallentin began representing Hans Dichand, the founder, publisher, and editor-in-chief of the Neue Kronen Zeitung, in a number of legal cases, particularly against the WAZ Media Group. This included media arbitration proceedings as well as pressing damages claims after the discontinuation of the newspaper U-Express. During the foundation of Dichand's new newspaper Heute, Wallentin filed a trademark for the brand; it was later suspected that Dichand was covertly funneling funds for this new venture via a shell company owned by his wife.

In 2012, Wallentin gained notoriety as a lawyer and defence counsel for Helmut Elsner, former director of the bank BAWAG P.S.K., in a case which resulted in the Austrian Trade Union Federation owing two billion euro in damages. Wallentin made various television appearances during the course of proceedings, including on ZIB 2 with Armin Wolf, where he made headlines for his blunt attempts to dodge questions.

Wallentin began working as a journalist in 2004, writing reviews for the Neue Zürcher Zeitung under a pseudonym. Between 2013 and 2022, he wrote the full-page weekly column "Frankly said" in the Krone bunt, the Sunday edition of the Kronen Zeitung.

During the 2017 coalition formation between the Austrian People's Party (ÖVP) and Freedom Party of Austria (FPÖ), the two parties signed a confidential supplementary paper detailing planned division of personnel in the government. Wallentin was proposed as a member of the Constitutional Court. However, Michael Rami was appointed instead. Reports of the paper only surfaced in January 2022, after the government had left office.

== Politics ==
On 11 August 2022, Wallentin announced his candidacy for the 2022 Austrian presidential election. He was endorsed by billionaire and former politician Frank Stronach. On 21 August, Wallentin placed a full-page advertisement for his candidacy in the Krone bunt, the Sunday edition of the Kronen Zeitung. On the reverse side of the page was a signature form which could be cut out and filled in; the advertisement was composed to ensure the back of the form would be blank. Wallentin had researched and concluded that there was no regulation of paper thickness for signature forms, meaning that the newspaper cutout was legally valid for the signature-collecting process. On 24 August, he announced that he had received the 6,000 signatures needed to qualify for the election. By 29 August, he had received 18,000 signatures.

Wallentin portrayed himself as an anti-establishment candidate. Commentators suggested he drew from the FPÖ's electorate, as well as older voters and ÖVP supporters. Prior to the campaign, there was media speculation that he could be nominated as the FPÖ's presidential candidate.

Shortly after announcing his candidacy, Falter published screenshots of allegedly sexist content from Wallentin's Instagram account, which he had deactivated shortly before. He said that some of the content was posted by others, and argued that a few posts had been cherrypicked out of dozens as part of a mud-slinging campaign against him.

On 19 September 2022, Wallentin appeared as a guest on ZIB 2, where presenter Armin Wolf claimed that Wallentin's books contained numerous errors. For example, one of Wallentin's books stated that asylum seekers received minimum income support, although it was actually basic income support. Ultimately, this was the only error that could be proven. Back in 2017, Vice analysed a column by Wallentin and claimed that it contained numerous errors, but without providing any factual justification.

Wallentin won 327,214 votes in the election, a total of 8.07%, placing fourth.
