= SGI Europe =

Labor relations group

SGI Europe (known as CEEP – European Centre of Employers and Enterprises providing Public Services and Services of General Interest until December 2020) is a European association representing enterprises which carry out services of general interest, whatever their ownership or status.

SGI Europe is one of the three cross-industry social partners (SGI Europe, BUSINESSEUROPE and European Association of Craft, Small and Medium-Sized Enterprises as employers' associations and ETUC as trade union) at European level, recognized by the European Commission. It represents employers of public services and of services of general interest in the European Social Dialogue.

SGI Europe, and its Brussels General Secretariat, represents the interests of its members before European institutions. By means of contacts to European institutions such as the European Parliament, the Economic and Social Committee, the European Committee of the Regions and the European Commission, SGI Europe is consulted on draft Regulations, Directives and other pieces of legislation of interest to its members. SGI Europe sends representatives and observers to committees and consultative bodies of the European institutions, and so is able to keep its members up to date on the latest developments at European level which are of interest to them.

Since 8 December 2020, Pascal Bolo has been President of SGI Europe, and Valeria Ronzitti has been General Secretary.
