= The Beer Party (Austria) =

The Beer Party Die Bierpartei
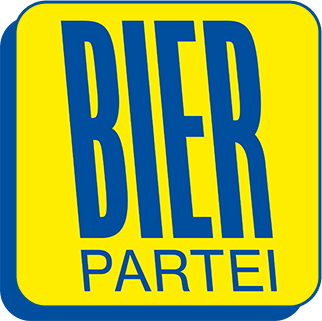
- Abbreviation: BIER
- Leader: Dominik Wlazny
- Founder: Dominik Wlazny
- Founded: 2015
- Dissolved: 3 February 2025 (as an electoral force)
- Headquarters: Vienna
- Ideology: Social liberalism Political satire
- Colors: Yellow; Blue

Website
- www.bierpartei.eu

The Beer Party (German: die Bierpartei, BIER) was an Austrian political party. Founded in 2015, it was originally known as the Beer Party of Austria (Bierpartei Österreich) and used the corresponding abbreviation BPÖ until its renaming in 2020. The party's activity is confined to Vienna, where BIER first appeared on ballots in the 2019 Austrian legislative election and appeared again in the 2020 Viennese state election. As of 2020, it has been unable to amass the votes required for representation in the National Council, Federal Council, or the Landtage, claiming 0.6% of Viennese votes in 2019 and 1.8% in 2020. However, the party was able to win mandates in 11 of Vienna's districts. The party is organized purely at the federal level without state parties.

Since 2024 the abbreviation BIER is interpreted by the party as "Bin in einer Reformbewegung" ((I) Am In A Reform Movement)

On 3 February 2025, the party announced it would no longer continue as a regular political party nor take part in any further elections.

== Background ==
Beer Parties exist throughout the world, especially in Eastern Europe. Already in the last 1990 East German general election, the electoral list of the "German Beer Drinkers' Union" (Deutsche Biertrinker Union) had been presented in the constituency of Rostock, which had only obtained 2,534 votes and no elected persons, in addition to a handful of votes in five other local elections in the German federal states. Another well-known example was the Polish Beer-Lovers' Party, which started as a prank and won 2.97% of the vote and 16 seats in the Sejm after Poland's 1991 parliamentary elections, even joining the government of Hanna Suchocka with its own minister. Such parties are satirical as a general rule, though they can develop more serious platforms, as was the case for the Polish Beer-Lover's Party.

== History ==
=== Formation ===
The party was founded in 2015 by Marco Pogo, the frontman of the Viennese punk rock band Turbobier. Pogo, whose legal name is Dominik Wlazny, holds a medical degree and was a practising medical doctor before the success of his band led him to change careers. The idea for the Beer Party likely grew out of a song, "Die Bierpartei," which appeared on Turbobier's debut album, Irokesentango. In an interview with Kulturwoche.at, Pogo stated that "the country needs a strong movement—a strong movement for beer... I did it for the country." He also went on to state that his continuing involvement in politics is inspired by the 2019 Ibiza Affair.

=== 2019 legislative election ===
The BIER Party (then still operating as BPÖ) did not take part in elections during the first four years following its establishment. In 2019, it capitalized on the satirical potential of the Ibiza affair and advertised itself with giveaways of free beer in order to gain the declarations of support (Unterstützungserklärungen) necessary for participation in the election. As one motivation for its candidacy, the party declared that "drunk stories"—a play on a statement by far-right populist politician Heinz-Christian Strache downplaying the affair—were best left to the professionals. A nationwide campaign was obviously infeasible, so BIER focused on Vienna and was ultimately able to amass enough support there to appear on the ballot. According to a July 2019 online poll of the tabloid newspaper Österreich, 23% of respondents could imagine voting for the Beer Party under certain circumstances. In the election the party ultimately won 4,946 votes corresponding to 0.6% in Vienna and 0.1% Austria-wide.

=== 2020 Viennese state election ===
Immediately after the announcement of the results of the 2019 National Council election, the BIER Party announced its intention to launch a campaign for the 2020 Viennese State Election. However, collecting the necessary 1800 signed declarations of support posed a logistical problem due to the shutdown-measures put in place during the COVID-19 pandemic in Austria. The Beer Party pointed out that this was especially problematic for small parties that depend on direct contact with voters and criticized the situation as unfair. Still, even without external sponsors the BIER Party was able to gather enough support to enter the election. For the concurrently occurring 2020 district representative election, the party ran candidates for district representative in every Viennese district except the 1st.

The campaign kicked off with a "beer rally" led by Marco Pogo and his functionaries from throughout all 23 districts. One of the party's election promises was to replace the Hochstrahlbrunnen, a fountain in Schwarzenbergplatz, with a beer fountain. Among the more serious goals of the Beer Party were support through the corona crisis for Vienna's culture scene, which was badly hit by pandemic lockdown measures. The Beer Party was, by October 2020 notably able to capture more social media engagement than any other party—including the major parties—with a budget of only 200 Euros despite the competition having invested tens of thousands in advertisement. Also notable was the support of Niko Alm, a former member of the National Council who campaigned for the Beer Party.

With 1.8% of the vote, the BIER Party did not win representation in the Landtag. However, the party did win mandates in 11 of Vienna's districts. Since the party only put forward a total of six candidates for the election, representative for the remaining mandates had to be nominated afterwards. The party leader, Pogo, will serve as a representative for Simmering, the 11th district.

Pogo indicated that a future goal for the party will be the election for federal president anticipated to be held in 2022.

=== 2022 Austrian presidential election ===
In a press conference on 13 June 2022, Marco Pogo announced that he intended to put into practice his candidacy for the federal presidential election in Austria 2022, which he had already mentioned after the Vienna provincial and municipal elections. On 19 August, he announced that he had collected the necessary 6,000 declarations of support. In the election, Pogo, under his legal name Dominik Wlazny, achieved 8.3%, putting him in third place behind the re-elected incumbent Alexander Van der Bellen and Walter Rosenkranz of the FPÖ.

=== 2024 legislative election ===
On 18 January 2024, Dominik Wlazny (alias Marco Pogo) announced the candidacy of the BIER Party for the 2024 Austrian legislative election. Political scientist Katrin Praprotnik thought he had a real chance of getting in. The BIER Party and especially Wlazny himself would particularly benefit from the "favorable mix" of domestic politics. Praprotnik sees the biggest challenges outside of Vienna. Not much can be said yet about election campaign topics and election programs, said Praprotnik. At the press conference there were still "a lot of headlines" and vague announcements. But she sees the most important issues for Wlazny and his beer party – equal opportunities, young people, equal rights, health and education – as being particularly interesting for "voters to the left of center". On Thursday he once again mentioned one of his central demands, namely to introduce aptitude tests for ministerial positions, as a political goal. Praprotnik no longer considers the beer party to be a fun project. There are no longer any demands for a beer fountain, and the 37-year-old has also said goodbye to his artistic alias Marco Pogo during his performances. In addition, his appearance has become more serious since the federal presidential election at the latest, especially "from the outside through his clothing".

On 26 June 2024 it was announced that the BIER Party had received enough validated signatures to candidate in the whole of Austria for the 2024 legislative election.

=== Menu (2024 election) ===
Prior to the 2024 election, it was announced that the Bierpartei would not have a regular Party program as such. Instead they would have a Menu, which would change frequently. The content of the so-called Menu would be developed by the visitors of the Stammtische, regular meetings of interested people all over Austria. The first Menüpunkt (Menu item) was presented on 11 July 2024 under overall title "A depoliticization of politics". The menu has been updated frequently since, including topics such as housing, migration, health care and economics.

== Election results ==
=== President ===
Election	Candidate	First round result			Second round result		
Election	Candidate	Votes	%	Result	Votes	%	Result
2022	Dominik Wlazny	337,010	8.31	3rd place	—N/a		

=== National Council ===
Election	Leader	Votes	%	Seats	+/–	Government
2019	Dominik Wlazny	4,946	0.10 (#9)	0 / 183	New	Extra-parliamentary
2024	Dominik Wlazny	98,395	2.02 (#7)	0 / 183	0	Extra-parliamentary

=== State Parliaments ===
State	Year	Votes	%	Seats	±	Government
Vienna	2020	13,095	1.80 (#8)	0 / 100	New	Extra-parliamentary

== See also ==
- Beer Lovers Party (Russia)
- List of frivolous political parties
- List of political parties in Austria
- Novelty candidate
- Polish Beer-Lovers' Party
