= Opinion polling for the 2024 Austrian legislative election =

In the run-up to the 2024 Austrian legislative election, various organisations carry out opinion polling to gauge voting intentions in Austria. Results of such polls are displayed in this list; the date range for these opinion polls are from the 2019 Austrian legislative election, held on 29 September, to the present day. The next election will be held on 29 September 2024.

== VdMI quality criteria ==
In 2017, the Association of Market and Opinion Research Institutes of Austria (VdMI) published quality standards for polls. While some frequent pollsters like Peter Hajek Public Opinion Strategies, IFES, IMAS, SORA, or Spectra are members of the VdMI, others like Unique Research are not, though they adhere to their quality standards. OGM used to be a member but was kicked out in late October 2021 for the use of online-only polling instead of a mix of phone and online polling. OGM argued that while a mixed method was ideal 15 years ago, today it is not necessary any longer, as 90% of households have internet access and younger voters cannot be reached by phone any longer. Other institutes are not members, such as Market or IFDD, and conduct some or all of their polls only online. The polling company Research Affairs, which came under scrutiny amid the Kurz corruption probe, was never a member of the VdMI; they once applied for membership but were rejected because of inadequate methodology.

In May of 2024, the VdMI quality criteria were changed. The most relevant changes were the sample size as well as the section about the polling method. Instead of an overall minimum of 800 respondents, a minimum of 1000 respondents for nationwide polls and a minimum of 800 respondents for polls in any of the states (Bundesländer) was now required. For local election polls in cities or other lower-level units, no recommendation is given. The sentence about online-only polling not being suited was removed; instead, it was now simply recommended to combine multiple polling methods.

== Poll results ==
=== From June 2024 to now ===
Polling firm	Fieldwork date	Sample size	Method	ÖVP	SPÖ	FPÖ	Grüne	NEOS	KPÖ	KEINE	BIER	LMP	Others	Lead
2024 legislative election	29 Sep 2024	–	–	26.3	21.1	28.8	8.2	9.1	2.4	0.6	2.0	0.6	0.8	2.5
IFDD	19–22 Sep 2024	1000	Online	25	21	27	9	9	3	–	3	–	3	2
Market-Lazarsfeld	16–22 Sep 2024	2000	Online	25	21	26	8	12	3	1	3	1	1	1
OGM	16–18 Sep 2024	1022	Online	25	21	26	10	9	3	1	3	1	1	1
Market	16–17 Sep 2024	800	In Person & Online	25	20	27	9	11	3	–	3	–	2	2
Market-Lazarsfeld	9–17 Sep 2024	2000	Online	25	20	27	8	11	4	1	3	0	1	2
INSA	9–11 Sep 2024	1000	Online	23	21	29	8	8	3	–	5	–	–	6
Unique Research	5–11 Sep 2024	800	Phone & Online	25	21	28	9	8	3	–	4	1	1	3
Market-Lazarsfeld	9–10 Sep 2024	2,000	Online	25	20	28	7	10	3	1	4	1	1	3
Spectra	2–9 Sep 2024	1,000	Phone & Online	24	21	27	8	10	3	–	5	–	2	3
IFES (Note: SPÖ's in-house pollster.)	Sep 2024	?	?	22	23	27	9	10	3	–	4	–	2	4
IFDD	2–6 Sep 2024	1,000	Online	25	20	27	8	9	3	–	5	–	3	2
Market-Lazarsfeld	2–4 Sep 2024	2,000	Online	26	20	28	7	10	3	1	4	1	0	2
Unique Research	28 Aug–4 Sep 2024	1,200	Phone & Online	24	20	28	9	9	3	0	6	1	0	4
Triple M Matzka	26 Aug–3 Sep 2024	1,000	Online	23	21	28	8	9.5	3.5	–	5	–	2	5
Market-Lazarsfeld	26–27 Aug 2024	2,000	Online	23	20	27	8	12	3	1	4	1	1	4
IFDD	23–26 Aug 2024	972	Online	25	21	27	9	8	2	1	5	1	1	2
OGM	19–22 Aug 2024	1,545	Online	24	21	27	9	9	2	1	5	1	1	3
OGM	Aug 2024	?	Online	23	21	27	9	9	3	1	6	1	0	4
Market-Lazarsfeld	19–20 Aug 2024	2,000	Online	22	21	29	7	11	2	1	5	1	1	7
INSA	5–7 Aug 2024	1,000	Online	19	21	31	9	8	2	–	7	–	3	10
Market-Lazarsfeld	5–6 Aug 2024	2,000	Online	23	22	27	8	10	2	1	5	1	1	4
Market-Lazarsfeld	22–30 Jul 2024	2,000	Online	23	22	27	8	10	3	–	5	1	1	4
IFDD	25–26 Jul 2024	1,100	Online	25	23	26	9	9	3	–	5	–	0	1
Market-Lazarsfeld	15–24 Jul 2024	2,000	Online	24	23	27	8	10	3	–	5	0	0	3
Spectra	12–21 Jul 2024	1,000	Phone & Online	22	22	27	9	9	4	–	6	–	1	5
Unique Research	8–12 Jul 2024	1,000	Phone & Online	23	20	28	9	9	4	–	6	–	1	5
Market	8–11 Jul 2024	815	Online	22	22	27	9	11	3	–	5	–	1	5
Market-Lazarsfeld	8–10 Jul 2024	2,000	Online	22	21	28	9	11	3	–	5	0	1	6
Market-Lazarsfeld	1–2 Jul 2024	2,000	Online	24	21	27	9	11	2	–	4	–	2	3
OGM	24–26 Jun 2024	1,023	Online	24	21	27	11	8	3	–	5	–	1	3
Market-Lazarsfeld	24–25 Jun 2024	2,000	Online	24	21	27	10	9	2	–	5	1	1	3
2019 legislative election	29 Sep 2019	–	–	37.5	21.2	16.2	13.9	8.1	0.7 (Note: Result obtained by the KPÖ Plus electoral alliance.)	0.5 (Note: Result obtained by the Der Wandel.)	0.1	–	2.5	16.3

=== From April 2023 to June 2024 ===
Polling firm	Fieldwork date	Sample size	Method	ÖVP	SPÖ	FPÖ	Grüne	NEOS	KPÖ	BIER	Others	Lead
Unique Research	12–19 Jun 2024	1,008	Phone & Online	23	21	27	9	10	2	7	1	4
Market-Lazarsfeld	10–19 Jun 2024	2,000	Online	23	22	25	10	10	3	6	1	2
Unique Research	10–13 Jun 2024	800	Phone & Online	23	21	28	10	8	2	7	1	5
OGM	10–11 Jun 2024	1,245	Online	23	24	27	9	8	3	5	1	3
Market-Lazarsfeld	10–11 Jun 2024	2,000	Online	22	24	26	8	10	3	6	1	2
EP Election	9 Jun 2024	3,584,456	Election	24.5	23.2	25.4	11.1	10.1	3.0	–	2.7	0.9
INSA	3–5 Jun 2024	1,000	Online	20	21	32	8	8	3	6	0	11
Market-Lazarsfeld	3–4 Jun 2024	2,000	Online	20	24	26	8	11	3	6	2	2
Market	24–28 May 2024	814	Online & CAPI	20	22	28	8	12	3	6	1	6
IFDD	22–24 May 2024	800	Online	23	23	28	7	8	3	7	1	5
Market-Lazarsfeld	17–21 May 2024	2,000	Online	20	21	29	8	12	3	6	1	8
IFDD	15–17 May 2024	1,000	Online	23	23	28	7	9	4	6	0	5
INSA	14–16 May 2024	1,000	Online	20	21	31	8	8	4	6	0	10
Peter Hajek	8–16 May 2024	1,200	Phone & Online	21	20	31	8	8	3	8	0	10
Market-Lazarsfeld	13–14 May 2024	2,000	Online	19	22	30	8	11	3	6	1	8
Market-Lazarsfeld	6–8 May 2024	2,000	Online	20	23	28	10	10	3	5	1	5
Triple M Matzka	3–7 May 2024	800	Online	19	22	29	9	8	4	8	1	7
Market-Lazarsfeld	26–29 Apr 2024	2,000	Online	20	23	28	10	10	3	5	1	5
Market	22–25 Apr 2024	842	Online & CAPI	20	23	29	9	10	3	5	1	6
Unique Research	22–25 Apr 2024	800	Phone & Online	20	21	30	9	8	4	7	1	9
OGM	Apr 2024	?	Online	22	22	27	9	9	4	7	0	5
Market-Lazarsfeld	22–24 Apr 2024	2,000	Online	19	23	29	10	9	4	5	1	6
Market-Lazarsfeld	15–17 Apr 2024	2,000	Online	19	23	28	10	10	4	5	1	5
INSA	8–10 Apr 2024	1,000	Online	20	21	31	9	9	5	–	5	10
Market-Lazarsfeld	8–10 Apr 2024	2,000	Online	20	24	27	9	10	4	5	1	3
Market-Lazarsfeld	29 Mar–3 Apr 2024	2,000	Online	20	22	27	10	9	5	6	1	5
Market-Lazarsfeld	25–27 Mar 2024	2,000	Online	20	21	27	10	10	4	7	1	6
Unique Research	18–21 Mar 2024	800	Phone & Online	21	21	30	8	8	5	7	0	9
OGM	Mar 2024	?	Online	21	23	27	8	8	4	7	2	4
Market-Lazarsfeld	18–20 Mar 2024	2,000	Online	19	23	27	9	9	5	7	1	4
IFDD	12–15 Mar 2024	1,505	Online	23	22	27	8	8	5	6	1	4
Market	12–14 Mar 2024	800	Online & CAPI	21	22	29	9	10	3	5	1	7
Market-Lazarsfeld	11–13 Mar 2024	2,000	Online	20	22	28	9	10	4	6	1	6
Market-Lazarsfeld	4–6 Mar 2024	2,000	Online	21	23	26	8	12	3	6	1	3
INSA	1–5 Mar 2024	1,000	Online	22	22	31	9	8	–	–	8	9
Peter Hajek	26–29 Feb 2024	800	Phone & Online	21	22	30	8	8	3	8	0	8
Market-Lazarsfeld	19–21 Feb 2024	2,000	Online	20	23	26	10	10	3	7	1	3
Market-Lazarsfeld	12–14 Feb 2024	2,000	Online	20	22	27	9	11	3	7	1	5
Market	5–7 Feb 2024	800	Online & CAPI	22	23	29	8	11	2	4	1	6
Market-Lazarsfeld	5–7 Feb 2024	2,000	Online	21	21	28	8	12	3	6	1	7
Market-Lazarsfeld	29–31 Jan 2024	2,000	Online	23	22	27	8	11	2	6	1	4
IFDD	25–28 Jan 2024	1,000	Online	23	23	28	8	9	2	6	1	5
Market-Lazarsfeld	22–24 Jan 2024	2,000	Online	22	23	26	9	10	2	6	2	3
INSA	22–24 Jan 2024	1,000	Online	21	22	31	9	9	–	–	8	9
OGM	18–24 Jan 2024	2,017	Online	22	22	28	7	10	–	6	5	6
Triple M	12–22 Jan 2024	800	Online	20	23	31	9	10	4	–	3	8
Market-Lazarsfeld	15–17 Jan 2024	2,000	Online	23	24	26	10	11	3	–	3	2
OGM	10–12 Jan 2024	1,005	Online	21	25	29	10	10	2	–	3	4
INSA	8–10 Jan 2024	1,000	Online	20	23	32	9	9	–	–	7	9
Market-Lazarsfeld	8–10 Jan 2024	2,000	Online	21	24	27	10	12	3	–	3	3
Market-Lazarsfeld	20–27 Dec 2023	2,000	Online	21	23	29	9	11	3	–	4	6
Market	18–21 Dec 2023	800	Online & CAPI	21	24	30	8	10	2	3	2	6
Market-Lazarsfeld	18–20 Dec 2023	2,000	Online	21	25	30	9	9	3	–	3	5
Market-Lazarsfeld	11–13 Dec 2023	2,000	Online	21	24	30	9	10	3	–	3	6
INSA	4–6 Dec 2023	1,000	Online	20	23	30	10	10	–	–	7	7
Market-Lazarsfeld	4–6 Dec 2023	2,000	Online	19	24	30	9	12	3	–	3	6
Market-Lazarsfeld	27–29 Nov 2023	1,000	Online	19	24	31	9	13	3	–	1	7
Unique Research	22–29 Nov 2023	1,600	Phone & Online	22	22	32	9	9	4	–	2	10
Market	21–23 Nov 2023	800	Online & CAPI	20	24	30	8	11	2	3	2	6
Market-Lazarsfeld	20–22 Nov 2023	2,000	Online	20	26	29	9	10	4	–	2	3
OGM	13–16 Nov 2023	1,072	Online	23	25	29	8	9	–	–	6	4
Market-Lazarsfeld	13–15 Nov 2023	2,000	Online	20	26	29	9	10	3	–	3	3
Unique Research	6–9 Nov 2023	800	Phone & Online	20	23	32	9	10	3	–	3	9
Market-Lazarsfeld	6–8 Nov 2023	2,000	Online	20	25	29	9	10	4	–	3	4
INSA	30 Oct–2 Nov 2023	1,000	Online	21	23	29	9	10	–	–	8	6
Market-Lazarsfeld	27–30 Oct 2023	2,000	Online	20	24	30	9	11	3	–	3	6
Market-Lazarsfeld	23–25 Oct 2023	2,000	Online	20	24	29	9	12	3	–	3	5
Market	16–19 Oct 2023	800	Online & CAPI	21	24	29	9	10	2	4	1	5
Market-Lazarsfeld	16–18 Oct 2023	2,000	Online	21	24	29	9	11	4	–	2	5
Peter Hajek	9–12 Oct 2023	800	Phone & Online	22	21	32	10	9	3	–	3	10
Market-Lazarsfeld	9–11 Oct 2023	2,000	Online	21	25	30	9	10	3	–	2	5
INSA	2–5 Oct 2023	1,000	Online	23	23	29	9	9	–	–	7	6
Market-Lazarsfeld	2–4 Oct 2023	1,000	Online	19	27	30	8	10	2	–	3	3
Market-Lazarsfeld	25–27 Sep 2023	2,000	Online	21	25	29	9	11	3	–	2	4
Market	18–20 Sep 2023	800	Online & CAPI	22	24	29	10	9	3	2	1	5
Market-Lazarsfeld	18–20 Sep 2023	2,000	Online	22	25	28	10	10	3	–	2	3
OGM	11–14 Sep 2023	1,029	Online	23	23	27	9	10	–	–	8	4
Unique Research	11–14 Sep 2023	800	Phone & Online	24	21	32	9	9	2	–	3	8
Market-Lazarsfeld	11–13 Sep 2023	2,000	Online	23	23	29	9	10	3	–	3	6
INSA	4–7 Sep 2023	1,000	Online	23	22	29	10	10	–	–	6	6
Market-Lazarsfeld	4–6 Sep 2023	2,000	Online	22	23	30	10	8	4	–	3	7
IFDD	29 Aug–1 Sep 2023	1,250	Online	24	23	27	12	8	3	–	3	3
Market-Lazarsfeld	28–30 Aug 2023	2,000	Online	22	23	30	10	9	3	–	3	7
Market	4–8 Aug 2023	805	Online & CAPI	21	22	28	11	10	3	4	1	6
INSA	31 Jul–3 Aug 2023	1,000	Online	24	22	30	10	8	–	–	6	6
OGM	18–20 Jul 2023	920	Online	24	25	27	9	9	–	–	6	2
Market-Lazarsfeld	3–12 Jul 2023	2,000	Online	23	23	30	11	8	3	–	2	7
INSA	4–6 Jul 2023	1,000	Online	23	22	32	9	9	–	–	5	9
Market-Lazarsfeld	26 Jun–5 Jul 2023	2,000	Online	21	25	28	10	11	4	–	1	3
Unique Research	26–29 Jun 2023	800	Phone & Online	21	23	30	10	8	5	–	3	7
Unique Research	26–29 Jun 2023	800	Phone & Online	20	20	28	8	7	4	12	1	8
Market-Lazarsfeld	19–28 Jun 2023	2,000	Online	22	23	26	10	13	4	–	2	3
OGM	19–22 Jun 2023	1,177	Online	23	24	28	9	9	4	–	3	4
Peter Hajek	19–22 Jun 2023	800	Phone & Online	24	22	30	9	9	4	–	2	6
Peter Hajek	19–22 Jun 2023	800	Phone & Online	23	19	29	8	6	4	11	–	6
Market-Lazarsfeld	12–21 Jun 2023	2,000	Online	21	23	27	11	11	4	–	3	4
Unique Research	12–15 Jun 2023	800	Phone & Online	24	20	30	11	9	5	–	1	6
Market-Lazarsfeld	5–14 Jun 2023	2,000	Online	23	23	28	11	9	4	–	2	5
Market	5–7 Jun 2023	800	Online & CAPI	22	20	27	12	11	4	4	–	5
INSA	5–7 Jun 2023	1,000	Online	24	20	30	10	9	–	–	7	6
Market-Lazarsfeld	26 May–7 Jun 2023	2,000	Online	24	21	28	11	11	4	–	1	4
Market-Lazarsfeld	26–31 May 2023	489	Online	22	20 (Note: Hans Peter Doskozil as frontrunner)	27	10	14	6	–	1	5
Market-Lazarsfeld	26–31 May 2023	511	Online	26	19 (Note: with Andreas Babler as frontrunner)	31	7	9	3	–	3	5
IFDD	25–27 May 2023	1,208	Online	22	25	26	10	9	6	–	2	1
IFDD	25–27 May 2023	1,208	Online	24	26	27	8	8	4	–	3	1
OGM	22–24 May 2023	1,186	Online	20	24	26	10	10	8	–	2	2
OGM	22–24 May 2023	1,186	Online	23	26	28	8	9	4	–	2	2
Market-Lazarsfeld	15–24 May 2023	2,000	Online	21	25	28	10	12	–	–	4	3
IFDD	16–18 May 2023	1,250	Online	24	21	27	9	8	7	–	4	3
Market	12–16 May 2023	800	Online & CAPI	22	24	27	10	10	3	4	–	3
Market-Lazarsfeld	8–16 May 2023	2,000	Online	21	25	26	11	11	–	–	6	1
Unique Research	8–11 May 2023	800	Phone & Online	23	23	29	10	9	–	–	6	6
Market-Lazarsfeld	28 Apr–10 May 2023	2,000	Online	21	25	26	12	10	–	–	6	1
OGM	24 Apr–4 May 2023	2,289	Online	23	20	28	9	9	7	–	4	5
INSA	2–4 May 2023	1,000	Online	23	23	30	9	9	–	–	6	7
Market-Lazarsfeld	24 Apr–3 May 2023	2,000	Online	21	25	28	10	11	–	–	5	3
IFDD	29 Apr–1 May 2023	1,250	Online	24	22	27	9	8	6	–	4	3
Peter Hajek	24–27 Apr 2023	800	Phone & Online	24	22	29	10	9	3	2	1	5
Market-Lazarsfeld	24–26 Apr 2023	1,000	Online	22	22	28	9	11	5	–	3	6
OGM	24–26 Apr 2023	1,021	Online	23	20	29	9	8	7	–	4	6
Market-Lazarsfeld	17–26 Apr 2023	2,000	Online	22	25	27	10	12	–	–	4	2
2019 legislative election	29 Sep 2019	–	–	37.5	21.2	16.2	13.9	8.1	0.7	0.1	3.0	16.3

=== October 2022 to April 2023 ===
Polling firm	Fieldwork date	Sample size	Method	ÖVP	SPÖ	FPÖ	Grüne	NEOS	MFG	BIER	Others	Lead
Market-Lazarsfeld	7–19 Apr 2023	2,000	Online	22	26	27	10	13	–	–	2	1
Market-Lazarsfeld	3–12 Apr 2023	2,000	Online	20	25	28	11	14	–	–	2	3
INSA	3–6 Apr 2023	1,000	Online	22	25	28	9	10	–	–	6	3
Market-Lazarsfeld	27 Mar–5 Apr 2023	2,000	Online	20	23	29	11	13	–	–	4	6
Market-Lazarsfeld	27–29 Mar 2023	1,000	Online	21	21 (Note: with Pamela Rendi-Wagner as frontrunner)	29	10	13	–	–	6	3
Market-Lazarsfeld	27–29 Mar 2023	1,000	Online	20	25	28	10	12	–	–	5	3
Market-Lazarsfeld	27–29 Mar 2023	1,000	Online	22	16	31	11	13	–	–	7	9
Market-Lazarsfeld	20–29 Mar 2023	2,000	Online	21	21	29	10	13	–	–	6	8
OGM	20–23 Mar 2023	1,038	Online	23	23	28	10	10	–	–	6	5
Unique Research	20–23 Mar 2023	800	Phone & Online	25	24	28	11	9	–	–	3	3
Unique Research	20–23 Mar 2023	800	Phone & Online	21	31	25	11	10	–	–	3	6
Market	20–23 Mar 2023	800	Online & CAPI	23	21	29	10	11	–	4	2	6
Market-Lazarsfeld	13–22 Mar 2023	2,000	Online	23	23	28	11	11	–	–	4	5
Market-Lazarsfeld	13–15 Mar 2023	2,000	Online	23	22	27	10	12	–	4	2	4
Unique Research	6–9 Mar 2023	800	Phone & Online	22	25	31	10	9	–	–	3	6
INSA	6–9 Mar 2023	1,000	Online	22	26	27	9	10	–	–	6	1
Market-Lazarsfeld	6–8 Mar 2023	2,000	Online	22	24	27	10	9	–	5	3	3
Market-Lazarsfeld	20–22 Feb 2023	2,000	Online	19	26	29	10	10	–	5	1	3
Market	17–21 Feb 2023	800	Online & CAPI	22	24	28	10	11	1	3	1 (Note: KPÖ: 1 %)	4
Unique Research	13–16 Feb 2023	800	Phone & Online	24	24	29	10	10	–	–	3	5
OGM	12–16 Feb 2023	1,043	Online	22	24	27	10	11	–	–	6	3
Market-Lazarsfeld	13–15 Feb 2023	2,000	Online	19	24	28	11	11	–	6	1	4
INSA	6–9 Feb 2023	1,000	Online	21	24	28	10	11	–	–	6	4
Market-Lazarsfeld	6–8 Feb 2023	2,000	Online	19	23	29	11	11	–	6	1	6
Market-Lazarsfeld	30 Jan–1 Feb 2023	2,000	Online	21	23	29	10	10	–	6	1	6
Market-Lazarsfeld	23–25 Jan 2023	2,000	Online	20	24	28	9	11	–	6	2	4
Unique Research	16–19 Jan 2023	800	Phone & Online	22	24	28	12	9	2	–	3	4
OGM	16–18 Jan 2023	1,002	Online	22	25	27	10	11	–	–	5	2
Market-Lazarsfeld	16–18 Jan 2023	2,000	Online	20	25	26	9	12	–	6	2	1
Market-Lazarsfeld	9–11 Jan 2023	2,000	Online	22	25	25	10	11	–	6	1	Tie
INSA	2–5 Jan 2023	1,000	Online	22	25	28	9	10	2	–	4	3
Market-Lazarsfeld	2–4 Jan 2023	2,000	Online	20	25	29	10	9	–	5	2	4
Market-Lazarsfeld	23–28 Dec 2022	2,000	Online	21	25	28	9	11	–	4	2	3
Market-Lazarsfeld	19–21 Dec 2022	2,000	Online	20	27	27	9	10	–	4	3	Tie
Peter Hajek	12–15 Dec 2022	800	Phone & Online	22	24	26	11	11	3	–	1	2
Market-Lazarsfeld	12–14 Dec 2022	2,000	Online	19	24	30	10	10	5	–	2	6
INSA	5–9 Dec 2022	1,000	Online	21	27	26	10	8	3	–	5	1
Unique Research	2–7 Dec 2022	800	Phone & Online	20	26	26	11	10	–	4	4	Tie
	28 Nov–7 Dec 2022	2,000	Online	21	25	29	9	10	–	5	1	4
Market	3–5 Dec 2022	804	Online	21	27	29	10	11	1	–	2	2
Market-Lazarsfeld	28–30 Nov 2022	2,000	Online	21	25	27	10	12	–	4	1	2
Market-Lazarsfeld	21–23 Nov 2022	2,000	Online	20	25	26	10	13	1	–	5	1
Market-Lazarsfeld	14–16 Nov 2022	2,000	Online	22	27	25	10	12	1	–	3	2
OGM	8–10 Nov 2022	1,091	Online	19	24	25	8	10	–	6	6 (Note: Wallentin 3%)	1
Peter Hajek	7–10 Nov 2022	800	Phone & Online	22	27	25	10	10	3	–	3	2
Peter Hajek	7–10 Nov 2022	800	Phone & Online	20	32	21	10	12	–	–	5	11
Unique Research	7–10 Nov 2022	800	Phone & Online	22	27	25	10	10	3	–	3	2
Market-Lazarsfeld	7–9 Nov 2022	2,000	Online	22	27	24	11	12	1	–	3	3
INSA	2–4 Nov 2022	1,000	Online	21	29	23	10	9	2	–	6	6
Market-Lazarsfeld	31 Oct–2 Nov 2022	2,000	Online	21	26	25	11	12	2	–	3	1
IFDD	26–28 Oct 2022	1,250	Online	20	27	25	11	11	–	–	6	2
IFDD	26–28 Oct 2022	1,250	Online	19	25	24	8	10	–	10	4	1
Market-Lazarsfeld	17–25 Oct 2022	2,000	Online	21	26	26	11	11	2	–	3	Tie
Market-Lazarsfeld	17–19 Oct 2022	2,000	Online	22	27	25	10	10	2	–	4	2
IFDD	10–14 Oct 2022	1,007	Online	23	28	24	10	10	–	–	5	4
Unique Research	10–13 Oct 2022	800	Phone & Online	23	28	24	11	10	2	–	2	4
Market-Lazarsfeld	10–12 Oct 2022	2,000	Online	22	28	25	10	10	2	–	3	3
Market-Lazarsfeld	10–12 Oct 2022	2,000	Online	21	27	23	8	8	2	7	4 (Note: Wallentin 2%) (Note: Grosz 1%)	4

=== September 2021 to October 2022 ===
Polling firm	Fieldwork date	Sample size	Method	ÖVP	SPÖ	FPÖ	Grüne	NEOS	MFG	Others	Lead
INSA	4–6 Oct 2022	1,000	Online	22	28	23	10	9	3	5	5
Market-Lazarsfeld	3–5 Oct 2022	2,000	Online	22	28	24	9	12	3	2	4
OGM	23–28 Sep 2022	1,098	Online	22	28	22	10	10	3	5	6
Market-Lazarsfeld	19–27 Sep 2022	2,000	Online	21	27	24	10	12	4	2	3
Market-Lazarsfeld	12–20 Sep 2022	2,000	Online	20	28	23	11	12	4	2	5
Unique Research	7–15 Sep 2022	1,600	Phone & Online	21	29	23	11	9	5	2	6
Market-Lazarsfeld	12–13 Sep 2022	2,000	Online	20	28	22	12	13	3	2	6
INSA	5–8 Sep 2022	1,000	Online	20	29	21	10	10	5	5	8
Market-Lazarsfeld	5–6 Sep 2022	2,000	Online	20	29	22	10	13	3	3	7
Market-Lazarsfeld	29–30 Aug 2022	2,000	Online	21	30	22	9	11	4	3	8
Market-Lazarsfeld	22–23 Aug 2022	2,000	Online	20	30	22	9	13	4	2	8
Unique Research	10–18 Aug 2022	1,615	Phone & Online	21	28	22	11	11	4	3	6
Market-Lazarsfeld	9–17 Aug 2022	2,000	Online	21	30	21	9	13	4	2	9
Market	8–11 Aug 2022	817	Online	22	30	21	11	11	3	2	8
Market-Lazarsfeld	8–9 Aug 2022	2,000	Online	23	31	20	9	11	4	2	8
INSA	1–4 Aug 2022	1,000	Online	20	29	21	10	10	5	5	8
Market-Lazarsfeld	1–2 Aug 2022	2,000	Online	22	29	22	11	11	3	2	7
Market-Lazarsfeld	25–27 Jul 2022	2,000	Online	21	29	23	10	11	4	2	6
Market-Lazarsfeld	18–20 Jul 2022	2,000	Online	20	31	23	9	11	4	2	8
INSA	16 Jul 2022 (Note: Publication date)	1,000	Online	21	30	20	10	10	5	4	9
Unique Research	11–14 Jul 2022	800	Phone & Online	22	29	21	10	11	4	3	7
Market-Lazarsfeld	11–13 Jul 2022	2,000	Online	21	29	22	10	12	3	3	7
Market-Lazarsfeld	4–6 Jul 2022	2,000	Online	23	30	21	11	9	3	3	7
IFDD	30 Jun–3 Jul 2022	1,000	Online	20	31	21	10	11	4	3	10
Peter Hajek	27–30 Jun 2022	800	Online	22	29	22	10	10	5	2	7
Market-Lazarsfeld	27–28 Jun 2022	2,000	Online	21	31	22	10	9	4	3	9
OGM	20–23 Jun 2022	1,015	Online	23	29	19	10	11	5	3	6
Unique Research	20–23 Jun 2022	800	Phone & Online	21	31	19	11	11	5	2	10
Market-Lazarsfeld	13–21 Jun 2022	2,000	Online	21	31	21	9	11	4	3	10
INSA	10–14 Jun 2022	1,000	–	22	29	20	10	11	4	4	7
Market-Lazarsfeld	7–14 Jun 2022	2,000	Online	22	31	19	9	12	5	2	9
IFDD	7–11 Jun 2022	1,250	Online	21	31	20	9	11	5	3	10
Unique Research	7–9 Jun 2022	800	Phone & Online	22	27	20	12	10	6	3	5
Market-Lazarsfeld	7–8 Jun 2022	2,000	Online	21	32	19	9	12	5	2	11
Market-Lazarsfeld	30 May–1 Jun 2022	2,000	Online	22	30	19	9	13	5	2	8
Market	23–25 May 2022	1,000	Online	23	29	20	10	11	5	2	6
Market-Lazarsfeld	21–24 May 2022	2,000	Online	23	29	20	11	11	5	1	6
Market-Lazarsfeld	16–19 May 2022	2,000	Online	23	29	21	9	11	6	1	6
Unique Research	9–12 May 2022	800	Phone & Online	22	27	20	12	11	6	2	5
Market-Lazarsfeld	9–11 May 2022	2,000	Online	23	27	20	9	12	5	2	4
OGM	29 Apr–5 May 2022	800	Online	26	26	18	12	10	5	3	Tie
Market	25 Apr–5 May 2022	2,000	Phone & Online	24	28	18	11	11	5	3	4
IFDD	21–24 Mar 2022	1,000	Online	23	28	19	9	10	6	5	5
Peter Hajek	25–28 Apr 2022	800	Phone & Online	26	26	18	12	9	7	2	Tie
Unique Research	22–26 Apr 2022	800	Online & CAPI	24	28	19	11	12	5	1	4
Unique Research	4–7 Apr 2022	800	Phone & Online	24	28	19	11	9	7	2	4
OGM	22–24 Mar 2022	968	Online	26	26	18	11	10	6	3	Tie
Unique Research	21–24 Mar 2022	800	Phone & Online	22	29	19	11	9	8	2	7
Unique Research	7–10 Mar 2022	800	Phone & Online	23	27	19	11	10	8	2	4
IFDD	21 Feb–1 Mar 2022	600	Online	23	28	20	9	11	–	9	5
Peter Hajek	21–24 Feb 2022	800	Phone & Online	23	25	20	11	11	7	3	2
Market	18–22 Feb 2022	803	Online & CAPI	24	27	20	11	12	5	1	3
Unique Research	7–10 Feb 2022	800	Phone & Online	24	25	18	13	10	7	3	1
Unique Research	10–13 Jan 2022	800	Phone & Online	25	25	20	11	11	6	2	Tie
Market	23–28 Dec 2021	800	Online & CAPI	24	26	21	12	11	4	2	2
Peter Hajek	13–16 Dec 2021	800	Phone & Online	27	25	17	14	10	4	3	2
Unique Research	6–9 Dec 2021	800	Phone & Online	27	27	17	11	9	6	3	Tie
Market	6–9 Dec 2021	800	Online & CAPI	24	26	22	12	11	4	1	2
IFDD	6–9 Dec 2021	552	Online	23	26	20	12	12	–	7	3
OGM	23–25 Nov 2021	837	Online	23	26	21	12	12	–	6	3
Unique Research	15–18 Nov 2021	800	Phone & Online	24	25	20	13	10	3	5	1
Unique Research	8–11 Nov 2021	800	Phone & Online	24	25	18	13	11	6	3	1
Peter Hajek	18–21 Oct 2021	800	Phone & Online	23	23	20	16	12	4	2	Tie
OGM	12–15 Oct 2021	1,170	Online	26	24	21	12	12	–	5	2
Unique Research	12–15 Oct 2021	800	Phone & Online	25 (Note: with Alexander Schallenberg as frontrunner)	25	19	14	11	3	3	Tie
Unique Research	12–15 Oct 2021	800	Phone & Online	26 (Note: with Sebastian Kurz as frontrunner)	24	18	14	12	4	2	2
Market	11–12 Oct 2021	800	Online	27	25	21	11	13	–	3	2
IFDD	7–11 Oct 2021	1,526	Online	26	25	21	11	11	–	6	1
IFDD	7–11 Oct 2021	1,526	Online	25	25	18	11	11	7	3	Tie
Research Affairs	28–30 Sep 2021	506	Online	34	22	15	10	9	5	5 (Note: KPÖ 4%)	13

=== January to September 2021 ===
Polling firm	Fieldwork date	Sample size	Method	ÖVP	SPÖ	FPÖ	Grüne	NEOS	Others	Lead
OGM	7–9 Sep 2021	804	Online	34	24	18	12	11	1	10
Research Affairs	30 Aug – 1 Sep 2021	500	Online	35	22	19	10	11	3	13
Research Affairs	24–26 Aug 2021	500	Online	34	21	19	10	12	4	13
Research Affairs	17–19 Aug 2021	504	Online	34	21	19	11	11	4	13
Research Affairs	10–12 Aug 2021	506	Online	34	21	18	10	12	5	13
Market	6–11 Aug 2021	805	Online & CAPI	31	25	18	13	11	2	6
Research Affairs	3–5 Aug 2021	500	Online	35	21	17	11	12	4	14
Unique Research	2–5 Aug 2021	800	Phone & Online	35	21	19	12	11	2	14
Research Affairs	27–29 Jul 2021	504	Online	35	20	17	12	12	4	15
Research Affairs	20–22 Jul 2021	504	Online	35	20	18	12	11	4	15
IFDD	15–21 Jul 2021	800	Online	35	22	19	11	12	1	13
Research Affairs	13–15 Jul 2021	504	Online	35	20	18	11	12	4	15
Unique Research	5–8 Jul 2021	800	Phone & Online	34	22	17	12	12	3	12
Research Affairs	5–8 Jul 2021	508	Online	35	21	17	11	12	4	14
IFDD	28 Jun – 2 Jul 2021	806	Online	33	24	18	12	12	1	9
Unique Research	28 Jun – 1 Jul 2021	800	Phone & Online	35	22	17	13	12	1	13
Research Affairs	28 Jun – 1 Jul 2021	508	Online	34	22	16	11	12	5	12
Market	29–30 Jun 2021	820	Online & CAPI	31	26	17	13	11	2	5
OGM	22–24 Jun 2021	801	Online	33	25	18	11	11	2	8
Research Affairs	22–24 Jun 2021	500	Online	34	23	16	12	11	4	11
Peter Hajek	21–24 Jun 2021	800	Phone & Online	34	23	18	11	12	2	11
Research Affairs	15–17 Jun 2021	500	Online	35	22	15	12	11	5	13
IFDD	10–15 Jun 2021	803	Online	32	27	18	11	11	1	5
Market	8–10 Jun 2021	841	Online & CAPI	32	27	16	13	11	1	5
Research Affairs	8–10 Jun 2021	502	Online	35	23	14	12	12	4	12
Unique Research	7–10 Jun 2021	800	Phone & Online	33	23	18	13	11	2	10
Research Affairs	31 May – 2 Jun 2021	506	Online	35	24	15	11	12	3	11
Market	24–30 May 2021 (Note: Fieldwork presented in survey as "KW21" (Kalenderwoche 21 - Week 21))	1,000	Online	29	28	20	10	11	2	1
Research Affairs	25–27 May 2021	500	Online	34	23	16	11	12	4	11
Research Affairs	18–20 May 2021	523	Online	34	22	17	11	12	4	12
Demox Research	14 May 2021	1,000	Online	33	23	18	12	11	3	10
Research Affairs	11–13 May 2021	500	Online	35	22	17	12	11	3	13
Unique Research	10–12 May 2021	800	Phone & Online	34	23	18	12	10	3	11
Research Affairs	4–6 May 2021	504	Online	36	21	17	12	11	3	15
Research Affairs	27–29 Apr 2021	511	Online	36	20	16	12	12	4	16
Peter Hajek	26–29 April 2021	800	Phone & Online	33	25	18	13	9	2	8
Research Affairs	20–22 Apr 2021	507	Online	36	21	16	12	11	4	15
Unique Research	5–8 Apr 2021	800	Phone & Online	33	24	19	12	10	2	9
OGM	30 Mar – 1 Apr 2021	801	Online	35	24	17	11	10	3	11
Research Affairs	30 Mar – 1 Apr 2021	1,000	Online	36	21	18	9	12	4	15
Market	26–30 Mar 2021	800	Online	36	26	15	12	10	1	10
Unique Research	23–25 Mar 2021	800	Phone & Online	36	23	18	11	11	1	13
Research Affairs	23–25 Mar 2021	501	Online	36	22	17	9	11	5	14
Research Affairs	15–17 Mar 2021	1,000	Online	37	24	16	9	10	4	13
Peter Hajek	8–11 Mar 2021	800	Phone & Online	35	25	17	10	11	2	10
Research Affairs	2–4 Mar 2021	510	Online	37	23	17	9	10	4	14
Unique Research	1–4 Mar 2021	800	Phone & Online	35	24	17	10	12	2	11
Research Affairs	15–18 Feb 2021	508	Online	37	24	17	8	10	4	13
Market	15–17 Feb 2021	1,000	Online	37	25	14	12	10	2	12
Unique Research	8–11 Feb 2021	800	Phone & Online	36	23	17	10	11	3	13
Research Affairs	8–11 Feb 2021	500	Online	38	24	16	9	10	3	14
Research Affairs	1–4 Feb 2021	500	Online	39	24	15	9	10	3	15
IFDD	25 Jan – 1 Feb 2021	800	Online	35	24	18	10	11	2	11
Unique Research	11–14 Jan 2021	800	Phone & Online	37	22	16	14	10	1	15
Research Affairs	4–7 Jan 2021	509	Online	39	23	16	9	9	4	16

=== 2019 to 2020 ===
Polling firm	Fieldwork date	Sample size	Method	ÖVP	SPÖ	FPÖ	Grüne	NEOS	HC	Others	Lead
Market	17–21 Dec 2020	809	Phone & Online	39	23	13	14	9	—	2	16
OGM	15—17 Dec 2020	794	Online	40	23	13	13	9	—	2	17
Research Affairs	14–17 Dec 2020	500	Online	40	22	15	10	10	—	3	18
Peter Hajek	8–12 Dec 2020	800	Phone & Online	39	22	16	13	9	—	1	17
Market	30 Nov–2 Dec 2020	800-1,000	Phone & Online	39	23	14	14	8	—	2	16
Unique Research	Dec 2020	814	Phone & Online	40	20	15	13	10	—	2	20
Research Affairs	20 Nov–3 Dec 2020	508	Online	40	22	13	10	11	2	2	18
Research Affairs	17–19 Nov 2020	500	Online	41	22	12	11	10	2	2	19
Research Affairs	9–12 Nov 2020	1,000	Online	41	22	12	11	10	–	4	19
Unique Research	2–6 Nov 2020	804	Phone & Online	38	21	16	12	10	–	3	17
Research Affairs	27–29 Oct 2020	500	Online	40	22	10	11	10	4	3	18
OGM	Oct 2020	2,000	Online	40	23	11	16	8	—	2	17
Research Affairs	20–22 Oct 2020	1,000	Online	41	21	10	12	10	4	2	20
Unique Research	14–18 Sep 2020	804	Phone & Online	39	20	16	16	8	–	1	19
Unique Research	12–16 Oct 2020	806	Phone & Online	40	22	13	13	9	—	3	18
Research Affairs	28–30 Sep 2020	500	Online	41	20	11	12	9	5	2	21
Research Affairs	21–24 Sep 2020	506	Online	41	20	12	12	9	4	2	21
Unique Research	14–18 Sep 2020	804	Phone & Online	39	20	16	16	8	—	1	19
Research Affairs	14–16 Sep 2020	1,000	Online	42	19	12	12	9	–	5	23
Research Affairs	25–27 Aug 2020	503	Online	42	18	13	14	8	4	1	24
Research Affairs	25–27 Aug 2020	503	Online	41	19	13	14	8	–	4	22
Research Affairs	17–20 Aug 2020	505	Online	41	18	15	13	8	–	5	23
Unique Research	10–13 Aug 2020	806	Phone & Online	41	18	15	16	9	–	1	23
Research Affairs	3–6 Aug 2020	500	Online	41	18	12	15	9	3	2	23
Research Affairs	20–22 Jul 2020	500	Online	42	19	11	15	8	–	4	23
Research Affairs	20–22 Jul 2020	500	Online	42	19	11	15	8	4	1	23
Unique Research	13–16 Jul 2020	801	Phone & Online	41	19	15	16	8	–	1	22
Research Affairs	6–9 Jul 2020	503	Online	41	20	11	15	8	–	3	21
Research Affairs	6–9 Jul 2020	503	Online	41	20	11	15	8	3	2	21
OGM	23–25 Jun 2020	805	Online	42	19	13	16	8	–	2	23
Research Affairs	22–24 Jun 2020	503	Online	42	19	11	15	8	3	2	23
Unique Research	9–12 Jun 2020	802	Phone & Online	44	17	14	16	8	–	1	27
Research Affairs	5–10 Jun 2020	1,000	Online	42	19	12	16	7	3	1	23
Karmasin Research & Identity	5–9 Jun 2020	1,000	Phone & Online	42	19	13	15	8	–	3	23
Research Affairs	25–28 May 2020	1,000	Online	43	18	12	16	7	3	1	25
Market	21–26 May 2020	809	Phone & Online	44	20	12	16	7	–	1	24
Market	18–19 May 2020	1,000	Online	43	21	12	17	6	–	1	22
Unique Research	11–14 May 2020	802	Phone & Online	46	17	14	15	6	–	2	29
Market	11–13 May 2020	1,000	Online	44	21	11	17	6	–	1	23
Research Affairs	11–13 May 2020	1,000	Online	44	18	11	17	7	2	1	26
Research Affairs	4–6 May 2020	501	Online	45	17	10	18	6	3	1	27
Research Affairs	20–23 Apr 2020	1,000	Online	45	16	10	19	6	2	2	26
Market	20–22 Apr 2020	1,000	Online	44	20	10	18	7	–	1	24
Unique Research	13–16 Apr 2020	806	Phone & Online	48	16	13	16	6	–	1	32
Peter Hajek	7–14 Apr 2020	807	Phone & Online	46	17	10	16	7	3	1	29
Market	3–7 Apr 2020	1,800	Phone & Online	44	19	11	19	6	–	1	25
Research Affairs	2–7 Apr 2020	500	Online	41	18	10	19	7	3	2	22
OGM	31 Mar–2 Apr 2020	800	Online	45	16	12	18	7	–	2	27
Market	24–31 Mar 2020	1,000	Online	43	19	11	19	7	–	1	24
Research Affairs	23–25 Mar 2020	500	Online	40	18	11	18	8	3	2	22
Unique Research	9–13 Mar 2020	811	Phone & Online	39	16	17	16	9	–	3	22
Market	11–12 Mar 2020	1,000	Online	40	20	13	17	9	–	1	20
Research Affairs	5–11 Mar 2020	817	Online	39	17	12	17	9	4	2	22
Research Affairs	24–27 Feb 2020	1,003	Online	39	17	11	17	10	5	1	22
Unique Research	10–14 Feb 2020	804	Phone & Online	38	15	16	17	10	–	3	21
Research Affairs	7–12 Feb 2020	1,002	Online	39	18	13	17	9	–	4	21
Research Affairs	7–12 Feb 2020	1,002	Online	39	18	12	17	9	4	1	21
Market	4–6 Feb 2020	813	Phone & Online	39	19	15	17	9	–	1	20
Research Affairs	28–31 Jan 2020	1,003	Online	39	17	13	17	10	–	4	22
Research Affairs	28–31 Jan 2020	1,003	Online	39	17	11	17	10	5	1	22
Peter Hajek	27–31 Jan 2020	802	Phone & Online	40	18	15	14	9	3	1	22
Research Affairs	17–23 Jan 2020	1,002	Online	39	16	13	17	11	–	4	22
Research Affairs	17–23 Jan 2020	1,002	Online	39	16	12	17	11	4	1	22
Research Affairs	10–16 Jan 2020	863	Online	39	16	13	17	10	–	5	22
Research Affairs	10–16 Jan 2020	863	Online	39	16	12	17	10	3	3	22
Karmasin Research & Identity	10–15 Jan 2020	1,000	Phone & Online	39	17	15	17	9	–	3	22
Unique Research	6–10 Jan 2020	806	Phone & Online	38	16	16	17	10	–	3	21
Research Affairs	3–9 Jan 2020	859	Online	39	17	13	17	9	–	5	22
Research Affairs	3–9 Jan 2020	859	Online	39	17	12	17	9	3	3	22
Market	16–19 Dec 2019	806	Phone & Online	39	19	14	16	10	–	2	20
Research Affairs	12–19 Dec 2019	877	Online	39	17	15	16	9	–	4	22
Research Affairs	12–19 Dec 2019	877	Online	38	17	14	16	9	4	2	21
Unique Research	9–13 Dec 2019	807	Phone & Online	39	18	15	17	10	–	1	21
Research Affairs	6–12 Dec 2019	875	Online	39	17	14	16	9	–	5	22
Research Affairs	6–12 Dec 2019	875	Online	38	17	14	16	9	3	3	21
Research Affairs	29 Nov–5 Dec 2019	831	Online	39	17	14	16	10	–	4	22
Research Affairs	29 Nov–5 Dec 2019	831	Online	38	17	14	16	10	3	2	21
Market	29 Nov–4 Dec 2019	792	Phone & Online	39	18	15	16	10	–	2	21
Research Affairs	22–28 Nov 2019	867	Online	38	18	14	16	10	–	4	20
Research Affairs	22–28 Nov 2019	867	Online	37	18	14	16	9	4	2	19
Research Affairs	15–21 Nov 2019	878	Online	38	20	14	16	9	–	3	18
Research Affairs	15–21 Nov 2019	878	Online	37	19	14	16	9	3	2	18
Unique Research	11–15 Nov 2019	817	Phone & Online	38	19	17	16	9	–	1	19
Research Affairs	8–14 Nov 2019	844	Online	38	20	15	16	8	–	3	18
Research Affairs	8–14 Nov 2019	844	Online	37	19	14	16	8	4	2	18
Karmasin Research & Identity	8–13 Nov 2019	3,000	Phone & Online	38	20	15	15	9	–	3	18
Research Affairs	2–7 Nov 2019	736	Online	37	20	15	16	9	–	3	17
Research Affairs	26–31 Oct 2019	788	Online	38	19	15	16	9	–	3	19
Research Affairs	22–25 Oct 2019	1,000	Online	38	19	15	15	9	–	4	19
Research Affairs	22–25 Oct 2019	1,000	Online	37	19	14	15	9	3	3	18
Research Affairs	22–25 Oct 2019	1,000	Online	37	19	14	14	9	3	4 (Note: JETZT 2%)	18
Market	15–17 Oct 2019	802	Phone & Online	38	20	16	15	9	–	2	18
Research Affairs	10–16 Oct 2019	1,001	Online	38	20	15	15	8	–	4	18
Unique Research	7–11 Oct 2019	807	Phone & Online	37	20	17	15	9	–	2	17
2019 legislative election	29 Sep 2019	–	–	37.5	21.2	16.2	13.9	8.1	–	3.1	16.3

=== By state ===
==== Vienna ====
Polling firm	Fieldwork date	Sample size	SPÖ	ÖVP	Grüne	FPÖ	NEOS	Others	Lead
Triple M Matzka	19–27 Aug 2021	1004	30	22	14	14	14	3	8
2020 Viennese state election	11 Oct 2020	–	41.6	20.4	14.8	7.1	7.5	8.6	21.2
2019 legislative election	29 Sep 2019	–	27.1	24.6	20.7	12.8	9.9	4.9	2.5

==== Tyrol ====
Polling firm	Fieldwork date	Sample size	ÖVP	Grüne	FPÖ	SPÖ	NEOS	Others	Lead
2022 Tyrolean state election	25 Sep 2022	–	34.7	9.2	18.8	17.5	6.3	13.5	15.9
IMAD	11–15 Nov 2019	500	42	19	10	11	10	7	23
2019 legislative election	29 Sep 2019	–	45.8	14.7	14.7	13.0	8.9	2.9	31.1

==== Burgenland ====
Polling firm	Fieldwork date	Sample size	ÖVP	SPÖ	FPÖ	Grüne	NEOS	Others	Lead
Peter Hajek	11 May 2022	–	28	38	16	8	7	3	10
Peter Hajek	3–14 Sep 2020	600	41	28	13	10	6	2	13
2020 Burgenland state election	26 Jan 2020	–	30.6	49.9	9.8	6.7	1.7	1.3	19.3
2019 legislative election	29 Sep 2019	–	38.3	29.4	17.3	8.1	4.9	2.1	8.9

== Preferred Chancellor ==
Polling firm	Fieldwork date	Sample size	Method	Nehammer ÖVP	Rendi-Wagner SPÖ	Kickl FPÖ	Kogler Grüne	Meinl-Reisinger NEOS	Other/ None	Lead
Market	6–9 Dec 2021	800	Online	21	16	11	8	7	—	5

Polling firm	Fieldwork date	Sample size	Method	Schallenberg ÖVP	Rendi-Wagner SPÖ	Kickl FPÖ	Kogler Grüne	Meinl-Reisinger NEOS	Other/ None	Lead
OGM	23–25 Nov 2021	837	Online	20	22	17	11	9	—	2
Unique Research	15–18 Nov 2021	800	Online	18	15	12	6	6	—	3
Unique Research	8–11 Nov 2021	800	Online	19	15	12	9	8	—	4
Peter Hajek	18–21 Oct 2021	800	Phone & Online	27	22	23	17	12	—	4

Polling firm	Fieldwork date	Sample size	Method	Kurz ÖVP	Rendi-Wagner SPÖ	Hofer FPÖ	Kogler Grüne	Meinl-Reisinger NEOS	Strache HC	Other/ None	Lead
Research Affairs	2–4 Mar 2021	510	Online	43	21	18	9	9	—	—	22
Unique Research	1–4 Mar 2021	800	Phone & Online	30	15	11	4	7	—	33	15
Unique Research	8–11 Feb 2021	800	Phone & Online	32	15	10	5	6	—	32	17
Research Affairs	5–10 Jun 2020	1,000	Online	49	19	11	12	5	4	—	30
Research Affairs	25–28 May 2020	1,000	Online	49	18	11	12	6	4	—	31
Market	18–19 May 2020	1,000	Online	33	10	—	6	—	—	51	23
Unique Research	11–14 May 2020	802	Phone & Online	45	9	6	6	4	—	30	36
Research Affairs	11–13 May 2020	1,000	Online	51	17	11	13	5	3	—	34
Market	11–13 May 2020	1,000	Online	44	10	7	6	—	—	33	34
Research Affairs	4–6 May 2020	501	Online	52	16	10	14	5	3	—	36
Research Affairs	20–23 Apr 2020	1,000	Online	52	15	10	15	5	3	—	37
Unique Research	13–16 Apr 2020	806	Phone & Online	55	8	7	8	3	—	19	47
Peter Hajek	7–14 Apr 2020	807	Phone & Online	62	11	7	12	5	2	—	50
Research Affairs	2–7 Apr 2020	500	Online	50	16	11	15	5	3	—	34
Research Affairs	23–25 Mar 2020	500	Online	48	16	12	15	6	3	—	32
Research Affairs	5–11 Mar 2020	817	Online	44	15	14	15	8	4	—	29
Research Affairs	24–27 Feb 2020	1,003	Online	43	14	14	15	9	5	—	28
Unique Research	10–14 Feb 2020	804	Phone & Online	37	8	13	10	6	—	26	24
Research Affairs	7–12 Feb 2020	661	Online	42	15	15	14	9	5	—	27
Market	4–6 Feb 2020	813	Phone & Online	37	9	11	14	11	—	18	23
Research Affairs	28–31 Jan 2020	500	Online	42	14	15	15	9	5	—	27
Peter Hajek	27–31 Jan 2020	802	Phone & Online	47	14	14	12	8	5	—	33
Research Affairs	17–23 Jan 2020	877	Online	43	14	16	15	12	—	—	27
Research Affairs	10–16 Jan 2020	863	Online	43	14	16	16	11	—	—	27
Research Affairs	3–9 Jan 2020	859	Online	43	15	16	16	10	—	—	27
Market	16–19 Dec 2019	806	Phone & Online	43	8	—	—	9	—	40	34
Research Affairs	12–19 Dec 2019	877	Online	41	15	16	15	8	5	—	25
Unique Research	9–13 Dec 2019	807	Phone & Online	37	8	12	9	—	—	34	25
Research Affairs	6–12 Dec 2019	875	Online	42	15	18	16	9	—	—	24
Research Affairs	29 Nov–5 Dec 2019	831	Online	42	14	18	16	10	—	—	24
Market	29 Nov–4 Dec 2019	792	Phone & Online	40	8	9	14	9	—	20	26
Research Affairs	22–28 Nov 2019	867	Online	42	15	18	15	10	—	—	24
Research Affairs	15–21 Nov 2019	878	Online	40	17	18	16	9	—	—	22
Unique Research	11–15 Nov 2019	817	Phone & Online	37	12	11	10	6	—	24	25
Research Affairs	26–31 Oct 2019	788	Online	41	16	19	14	10	—	—	22
Research Affairs	10–16 Oct 2019	1,001	Online	41	17	19	12	9	—	2	22
Unique Research	7–11 Oct 2019	807	Phone & Online	39	11	12	8	6	—	24	27

== Preferred coalition ==
Polling firm	Fieldwork date	Sample size	Method	ÖVP–FPÖ	ÖVP–SPÖ	ÖVP–Grüne	ÖVP–Grüne–NEOS	ÖVP alone	Other	Don't know/ no answer
Research Affairs	15–18 Feb 2021	508	Online	23	27	29	–	–	21	
Research Affairs	8–11 Feb 2021	502	Online	27	36	37	–	–	–	
Research Affairs	12–19 Dec 2019	877	Online	22	13	28	–	9	27	
Research Affairs	6–12 Dec 2019	875	Online	24	13	31	–	8	24	
Research Affairs	29 Nov–5 Dec 2019	831	Online	23	13	30	–	8	26	
Research Affairs	22–28 Nov 2019	867	Online	24	12	32	–	9	23	
Research Affairs	15–21 Nov 2019	878	Online	23	13	32	–	9	23	
Research Affairs	8–14 Nov 2019	844	Online	24	12	33	–	8	23	
Research Affairs	2–7 Nov 2019	736	Online	24	16	32	–	9	19	
Research Affairs	26–31 Oct 2019	788	Online	26	14	32	–	8	20	
Research Affairs	22–25 Oct 2019	1,000	Online	25	17	29	–	8	21	
Research Affairs	10–16 Oct 2019	1,001	Online	28	13	29	–	10	20	
Unique Research	30 Sep–3 Oct 2019	500	Online	23	12	21	18	9	17	

== See also ==
- Opinion polling for the 2019 Austrian legislative election
