= 2024 Austrian legislative election =

- 29 September 2024

All 183 seats in the National Council 92 seats needed for a majority
- Opinion polls
- Turnout: 77.7% (▲2.1 pp)
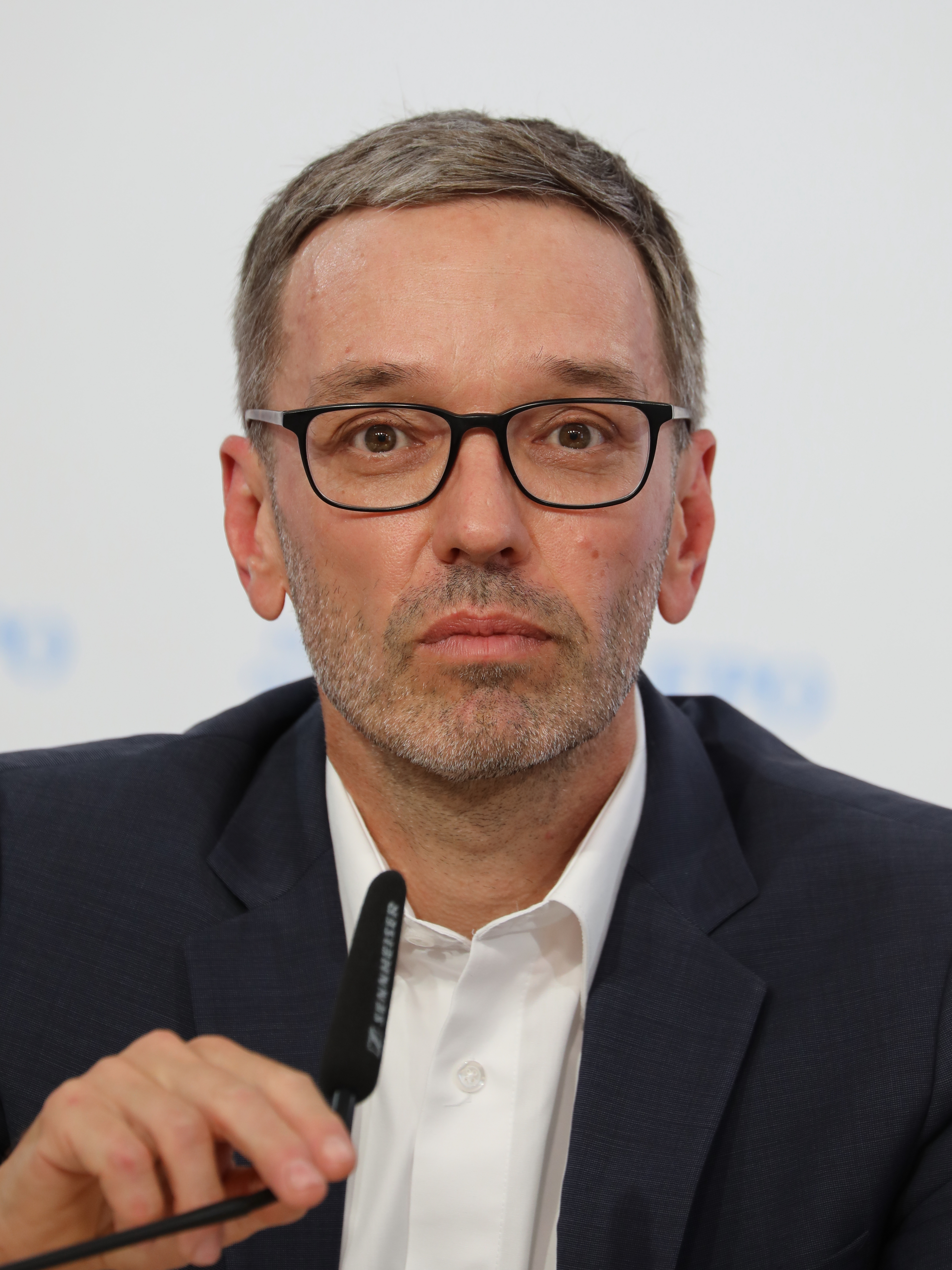

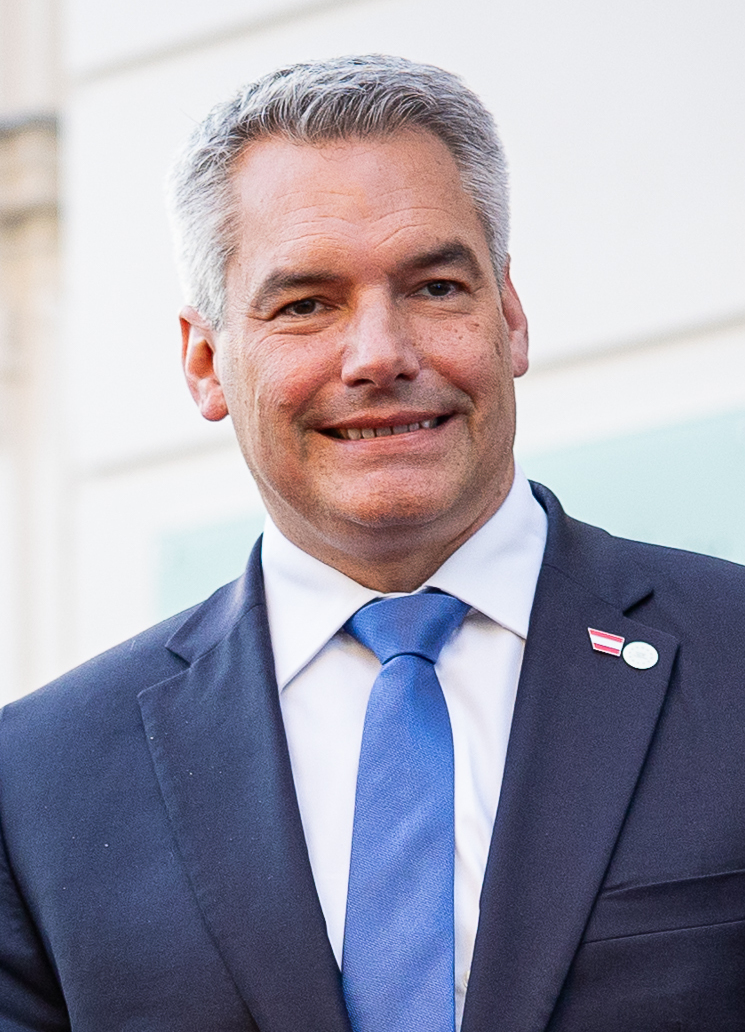

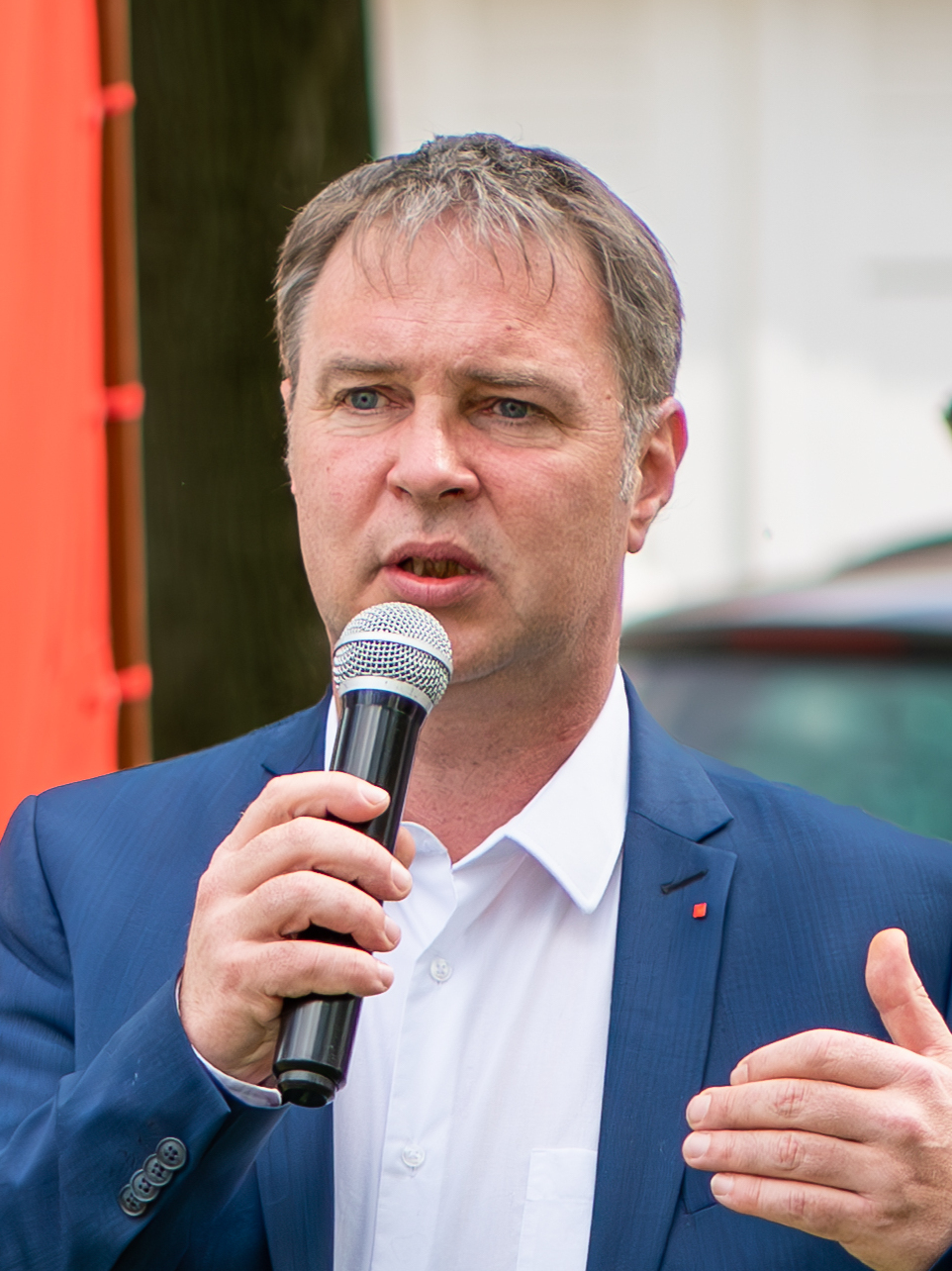

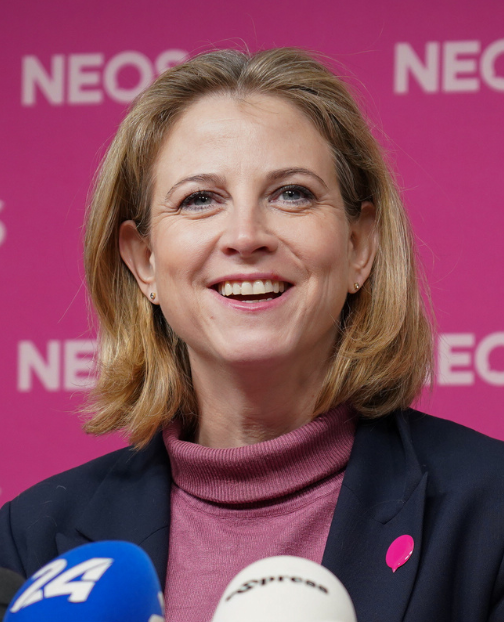

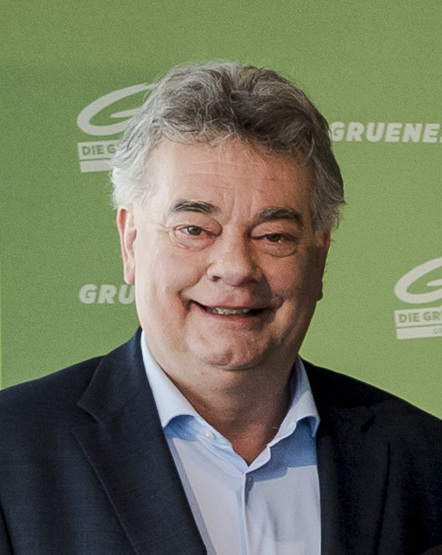
	First party	Second party	Third party
Leader	Herbert Kickl	Karl Nehammer	Andreas Babler
Party	FPÖ	ÖVP	SPÖ
Last election	16.2%, 31 seats	37.5%, 71 seats	21.2%, 40 seats
Seats won	57	51	41
Seat change	▲26	▼20	▲1
Popular vote	1,408,514	1,282,734	1,032,234
Percentage	28.8%	26.3%	21.1%
Swing	▲12.7 pp	▼11.2 pp	▼0.1 pp
	Fourth party	Fifth party
Leader	Beate Meinl-Reisinger	Werner Kogler
Party	NEOS	Greens
Last election	8.1%, 15 seats	13.9%, 26 seats
Seats won	18	16
Seat change	▲3	▼10
Popular vote	446,378	402,107
Percentage	9.1%	8.2%
Swing	▲1.0 pp	▼5.7 pp
Chancellor before election
Karl Nehammer
ÖVP
Chancellor after election
Christian Stocker
ÖVP

Legislative elections were held in Austria on 29 September 2024 to elect the 28th National Council, the lower house of Austria's bicameral parliament.

The election saw the far-right Freedom Party of Austria (FPÖ) place first, winning 28.8% of the vote and achieving the best result in the party's history. This was the first time that a far-right party won the most seats in a legislative election in Austria after World War II. As a result, the FPÖ, for the first time in its history, was able to occupy the position of the President of the National Council (Walter Rosenkranz) but ultimately fell short of participating in the government. The governing Austrian People's Party (ÖVP) lost 20 seats, while its coalition partner, the Greens, lost 10 seats. The centre-left Social Democratic Party (SPÖ) won just 21.1%, marking its worst result ever in terms of percentages and the place occupied (3rd), but it gained one seat compared to the previous election. NEOS slightly improved from 2019, rising from 15 to 18 seats. No other party was able to clear the 4% threshold to win seats.

== Background ==
The 2019 legislative election was called after the Ibiza affair, which triggered the collapse of the coalition government between the Austrian People's Party (ÖVP) and the Freedom Party of Austria (FPÖ) led by Chancellor Sebastian Kurz. The coalition was ousted in a motion of no confidence and replaced by a non-partisan interim government. The election delivered a strong victory for the ÖVP, which rose to 37.5%, while the FPÖ declined to 16%, its worst result since 2008. With 21%, the opposition Social Democratic Party of Austria (SPÖ) recorded its worst performance in over a century. The Greens returned to the National Council after failing to win seats in 2017, achieving its best-ever result with 14%. NEOS improved to 8%.

The ÖVP formed a coalition with The Greens, a first on the federal level in Austria. The new government took office in January 2020, with Sebastian Kurz returning as Chancellor.

Norbert Hofer announced his resignation as leader of the Freedom Party in June 2021. He was replaced by parliamentary group leader Herbert Kickl, whose dismissal as interior minister caused the collapse of the ÖVP–FPÖ government in 2019.

On 6 October 2021 agents of the Central Prosecutorial Agency for Corruption and Economic Affairs (WKStA) raided the Federal Chancellery and the headquarters of the ÖVP as part of a corruption probe targeting Chancellor Sebastian Kurz and his "inner circle". Prosecutors alleged that, in 2016, Kurz paid bribes to news outlets to publish coverage and opinion polling favourable to himself, the goal of the scheme being to undermine then-ÖVP leader Reinhold Mitterlehner so that Kurz could take his place. The Greens threatened to support a motion of no confidence if Kurz did not step down as Chancellor. He thus announced his resignation on 9 October and was replaced by Foreign Minister Alexander Schallenberg. However, he was quickly elected faction leader of the ÖVP in the National Council; it was widely understood that he would remain de facto leader of the government.

On 2 December, Kurz announced he would resign from all offices and retire from politics, citing a desire to focus on his family after becoming a father. Shortly after, Schallenberg announced he would resign as Chancellor in favour of the new ÖVP leader once one had been elected. On 3 December, Interior Minister Karl Nehammer was unanimously appointed as leader of the ÖVP by the federal party committee and proposed as Chancellor. He was sworn in by President Alexander Van der Bellen on 6 December.

Since 2019 numerous new and old minor parties such as Team HC Strache – Alliance for Austria, MFG Austria – People Freedom Fundamental Rights, The Beer Party and the Communist Party of Austria received at times considerable support in the 2020 Viennese state election, 2021 Upper Austrian state election, 2022 Austrian presidential election, 2023 Salzburg state election and various local elections, allowing these parties to win seats.

During the first year of the COVID-19 pandemic, the ÖVP-Green government enjoyed high support. The government then became deeply unpopular after it passed a mandatory vaccination law, which led to a strong polarization of the population. As a result, and because of large-scale public protests, the mandatory vaccination law (one of few in the world) was later dropped and was never enforced.

After a series of corruption scandals involving the ÖVP and rising inflation – such as skyrocketing housing, electricity, fuel and grocery prices – the government parties lost considerable support in 4 subsequent state elections in Tyrol, Lower Austria, Carinthia and Salzburg. As of May 2023, inflation in Austria was still around 10% and continues to be much higher than the Eurozone average, at around 7%.

Under Nehammer's leadership, Austria's government implemented a package of measures worth six billion euros ($6.3 billion) in 2022 aimed at cushioning the blow to households of the rising cost of living. The measures helped limit poverty, but according to experts increased inflation further.

On 8 December 2022, Nehammer was the architect of blocking Romania and Bulgaria's access into the Schengen Area. Nehammer said he first wants the EU to introduce strict border controls at the EU's outer border to limit illegal immigration before the two countries should be allowed to join Schengen.

On 3 June 2023, after years of internal conflicts, intrigues and crossfire, the opposition SPÖ elected a new party leader. The non-binding party membership vote ahead of the binding party congress was won by Hans Peter Doskozil, although by a simple plurality of votes, leaving the door open for a challenge by second-place finisher Andreas Babler at the party congress. On 23 May 2023, incumbent party leader Pamela Rendi-Wagner announced that she would not be a candidate at the party congress, after coming in just third in the membership vote and announced her orderly resignation. On 25 May 2023, Rendi-Wagner announced her complete withdrawal from Austrian politics by the end of June, also resigning as a member of the Austrian Parliament. On 3 June 2023, Hans Peter Doskozil was elected as the new party chairman with 53% of the delegates. However, two days later the SPÖ announced that the results had been mixed up in Microsoft Excel spreadsheets and that Babler was the actual winner with 53%, thus becoming the new party chairman.

The turmoil experienced by both the governing coalition and the SPÖ allowed FPÖ to top the polls during 2023, positioning it to win an Austrian legislative election for the first time.

According to polls conducted in May 2023, a government led by the FPÖ with Herbert Kickl as Chancellor was opposed by about two in three Austrians. Additionally, President Alexander Van der Bellen said that he might not swear in a FPÖ-led government with Kickl as Chancellor, but that he remains open to swearing in a more moderate FPÖ Chancellor.

The rise in inflation and in particular the increasingly unaffordable cost of housing saw the Communist Party of Austria (KPÖ) rise considerably in opinion polls conducted before the legislative election. The party received a record 11.7% percent of the vote in the 2023 Salzburg state election.

On 18 August 2023, Kurz (ÖVP) was charged in federal court for allegedly making false statements to a parliamentary investigation committee.

On 11 November 2023, the new SPÖ leader Andreas Babler was confirmed at a party convention in Graz by 89 percent of voting delegates.

On 18 January 2024, Dominik Wlazny (alias Marco Pogo) announced the candidacy of the Beer Party (BIER).

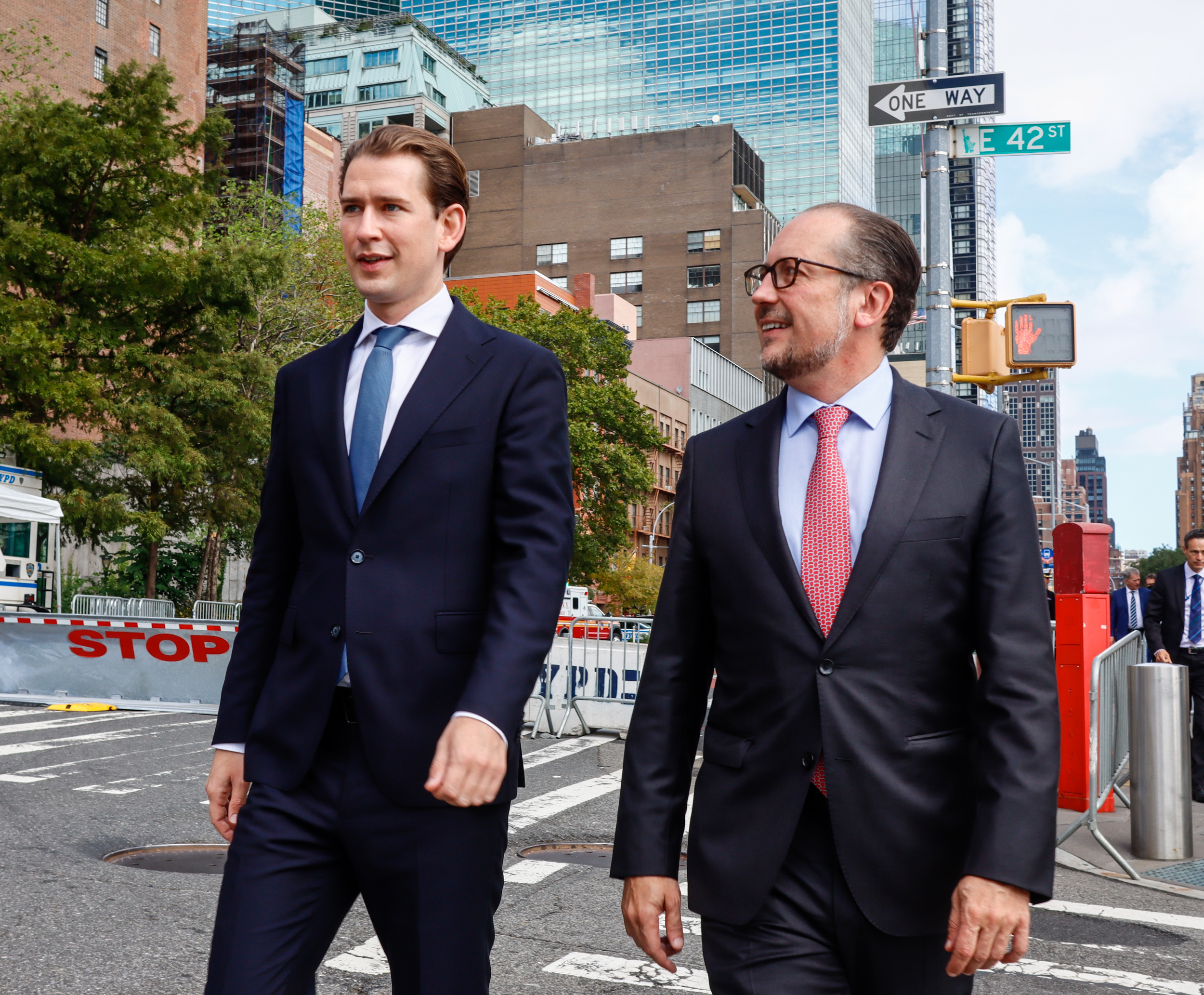
Sebastian Kurz and Alexander Schallenberg in New York City (2021)

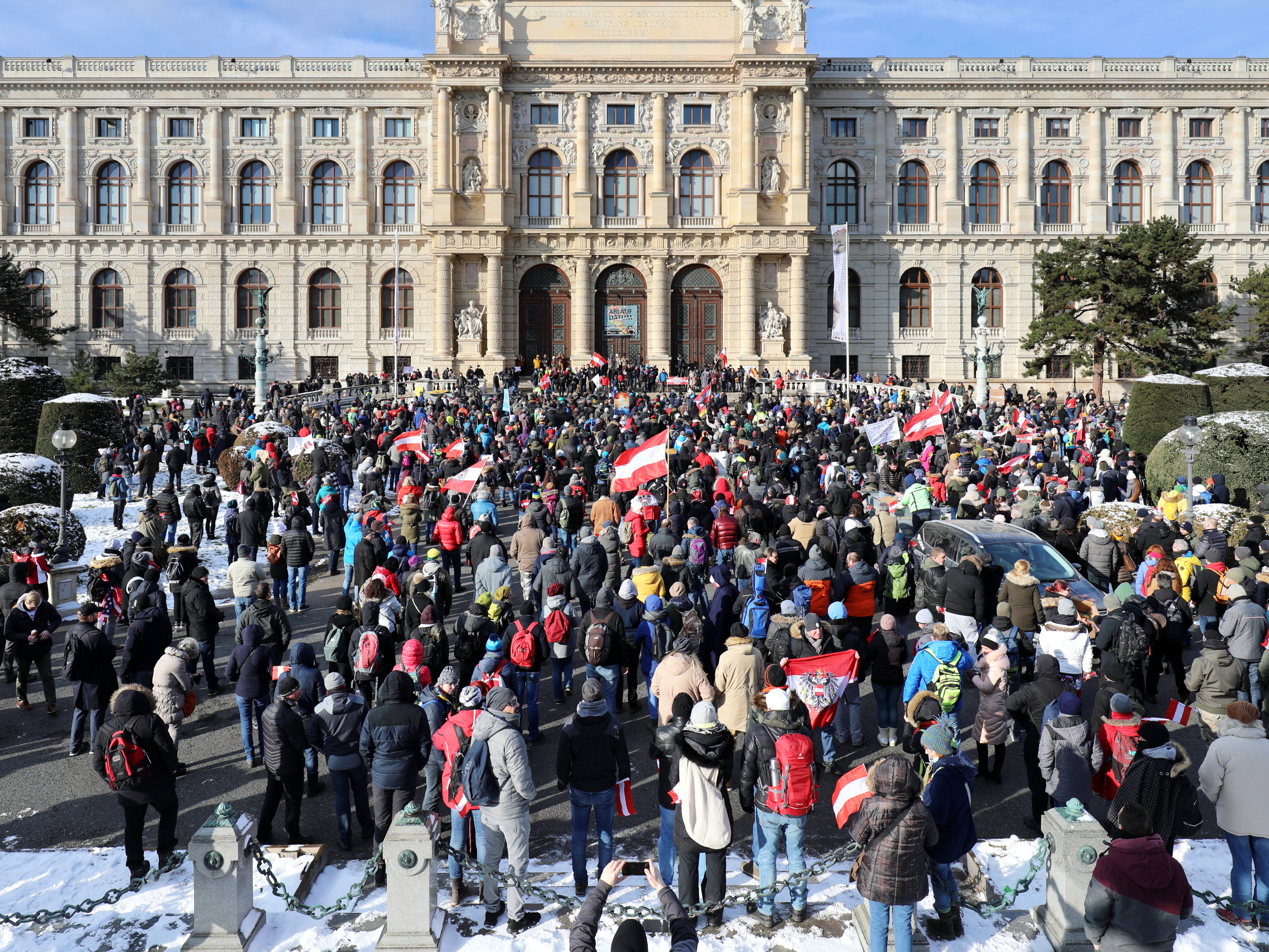
Protest against coronavirus restrictions in Vienna (2021)

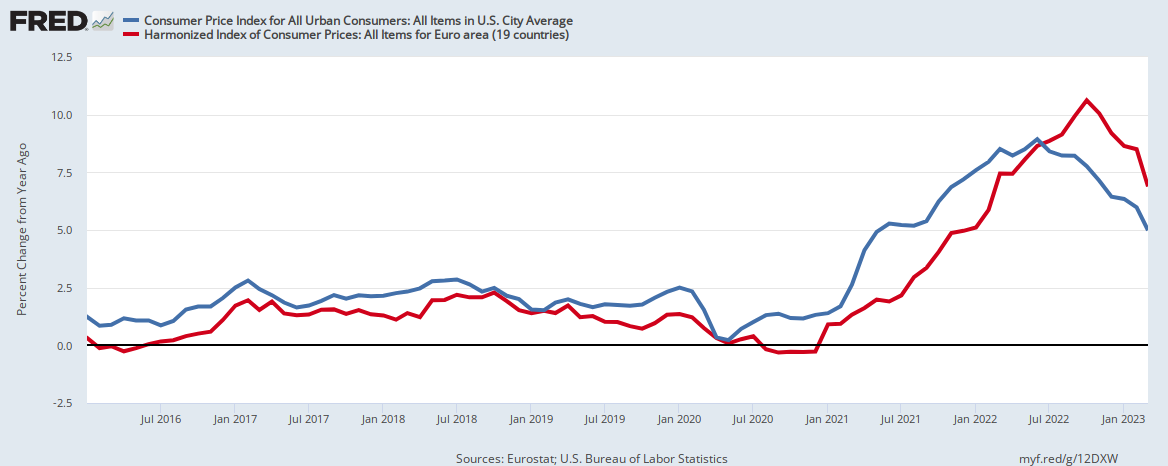
Eurozone (red) and US (blue) inflation rates (2016–2023)

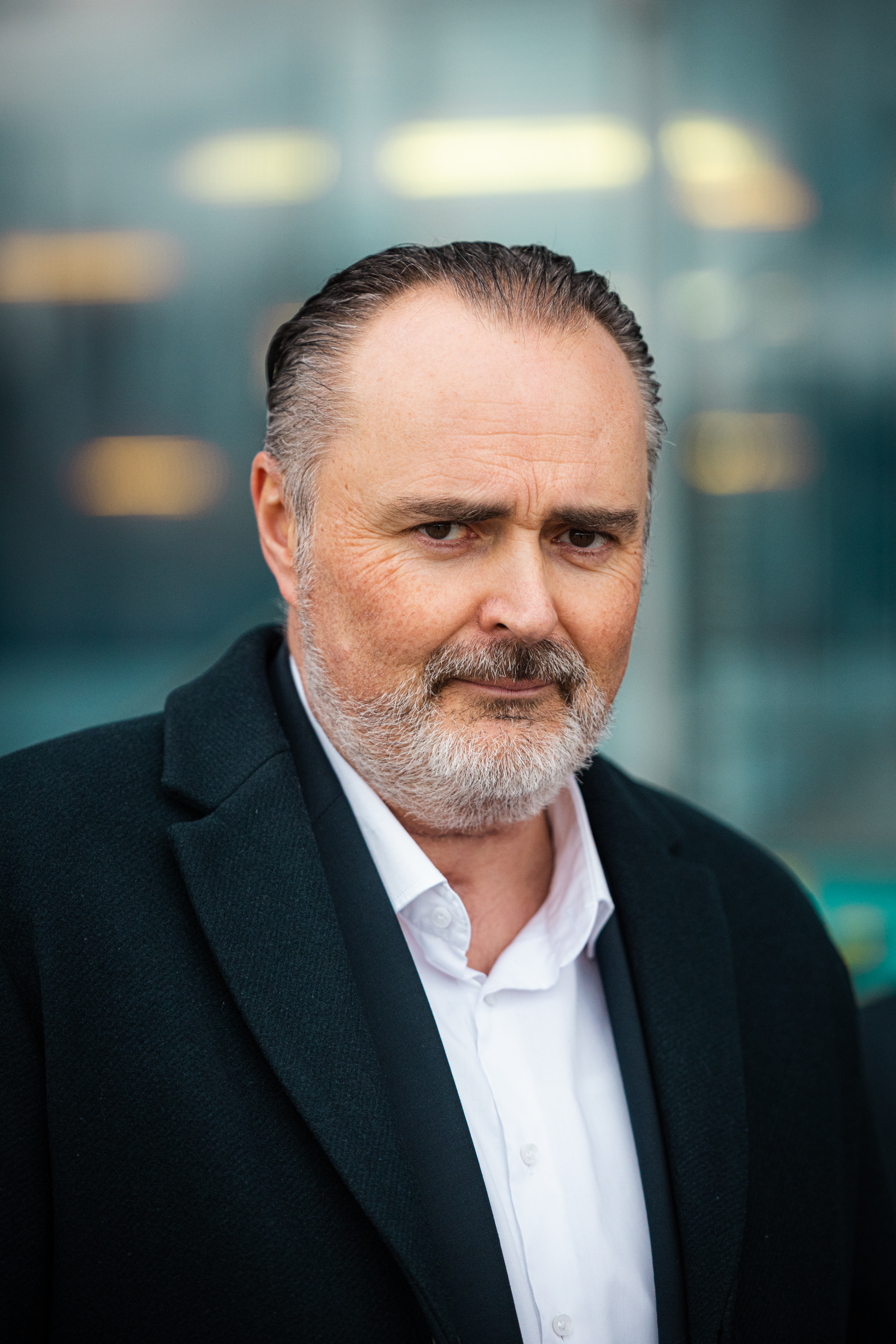
Hans Peter Doskozil - SPÖ, (2023)

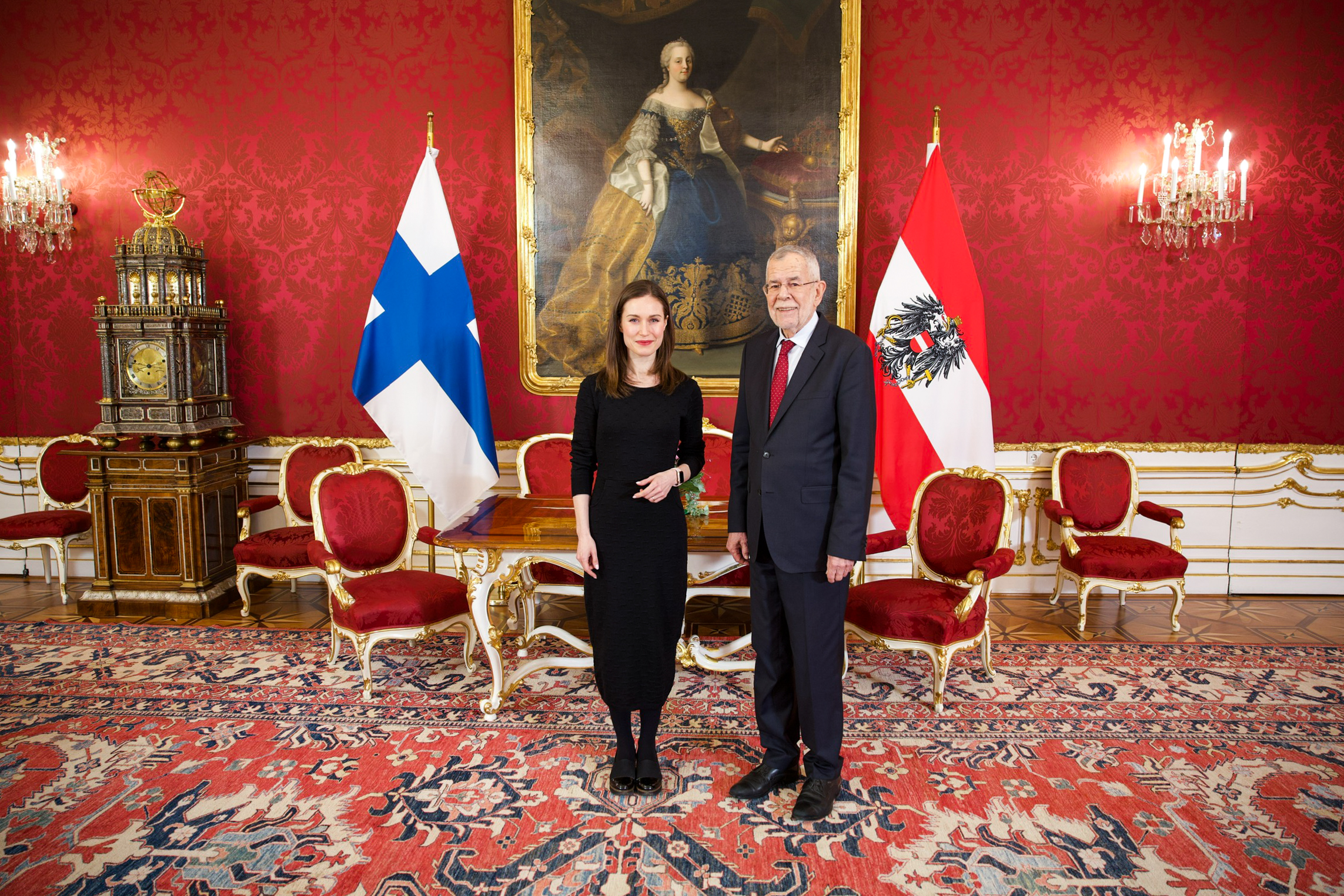
Austrian President Alexander Van der Bellen and Finnish Prime Minister Sanna Marin (2023)

=== Date ===
The election had to be held before the conclusion of the five-year term of the 27th National Council on 23 October 2024 (typically, regularly scheduled elections are held several weeks earlier than that, to allow for the publication of an official certified election result). Elections are traditionally not held during the school summer holidays, from early July to mid-September.

Due to the government's unpopularity, it was often speculated in the media that early elections would be called for the spring of 2024, but the ÖVP-Green government repeatedly said it wanted to finish its term and that the election would be held in September 2024.

In February 2024, Minister of Agriculture Norbert Totschnig (ÖVP) mentioned that the election would likely be held on Sunday 29 September 2024, exactly five years after the previous election.

On 28 June 2024, the federal government formally announced the election date of 29 September 2024. Polling stations opened at 07:00 and closed at 17:00.

== Electoral system ==
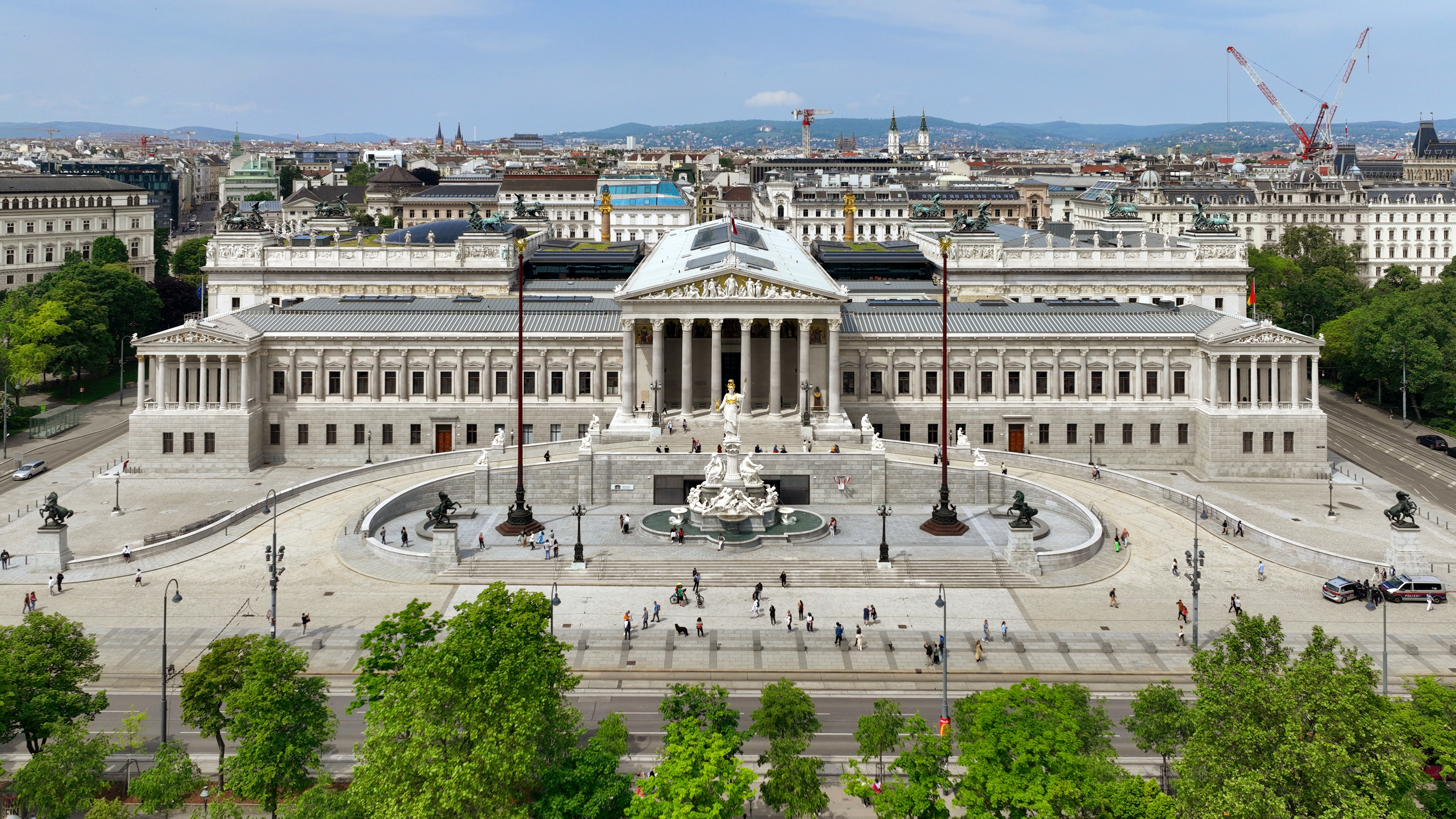
Austrian Parliament in Vienna (2023)

The 183 members of the National Council are elected by open list proportional representation at three levels; a single national constituency, nine constituencies based on the federal states, and 39 regional constituencies. Seats are apportioned to the regional constituencies based on the results of the most recent census. For parties to receive any representation in the National Council, they must either win at least one seat in a constituency directly, or clear a 4 percent national electoral threshold.

Following the elections, seats are allocated to the candidates of successful parties and lists in a three-stage process, starting with the regional constituencies. Seats are distributed according to the Hare quota in the regional constituencies, and with unallocated seats distributed at the state constituency level. Any remaining seats are then allocated using the D'Hondt method at the federal level, to ensure overall proportionality between a party's national vote share and its share of parliamentary seats.

In addition to voting for a political party, voters may cast three preferential votes for specific candidates of that party, but are not required to do so. These additional votes do not affect the proportional allocation based on the vote for the party or list, but can change the rank order of candidates on a party's lists at the federal, state, and regional level. The threshold to increase the position of a candidate on a federal party list is 7 percent, compared to 10 percent at the state level, and 14 percent at the regional level. The names of candidates on regional party lists are printed on the ballot and can be marked with an "x" to indicate the voter's preference. Preference votes for candidates on party lists at the state and federal level, however, must be written in by the voter, either by writing the name or the rank number of the candidate in a blank spot provided for that purpose.

=== Voting law reform ===
The ÖVP–Green government decided in early 2023 to reform the voting law. Among the reforms were the introduction of an early voting period, beginning three weeks before election day, during which voters can request absentee ballots in every municipality. Voters can either fill out the ballot in the municipality and therefore cast the ballot early, or take the absentee ballot with them and cast it later by mail, or in-person before or on election day. Previously, this was only possible in large cities. Another reform will be the counting of almost all absentee and mail-ballots on election day. Previously, most mail ballots were counted on the Monday and Thursday after election day. The new changes would lead to most votes being counted on election day, while only a much smaller number of late-arriving mail ballots and mail ballots from electoral districts other than the voters' own district will be counted on the Monday after election day. The 2024 European Parliament election in Austria was the first national election in which the new law took effect, and it showed that only about 130,000 absentee ballots had to be counted on the Monday after election day, compared to almost 960,000 on the Monday after the 2019 legislative election. Other reforms include measures to lower the number of invalid or spoilt votes among absentee/mail ballots, by re-designing mail ballot instructions and introduction of "easy language" (or plain language) on them. High fines and a prison sentence of up to two weeks will be introduced for election commission members who deliberately leak election results of their polling stations to the media or other third parties before poll closing time. The reform of the voting law, which took effect on 1 January 2024, was also supported by the three opposition parties SPÖ, FPÖ and NEOS, after several amendments were made to satisfy these parties too. The reformed election law was approved by the Nationalrat (National Council) on 31 January 2023 and by the Bundesrat (Federal Council) on 16 February 2023.

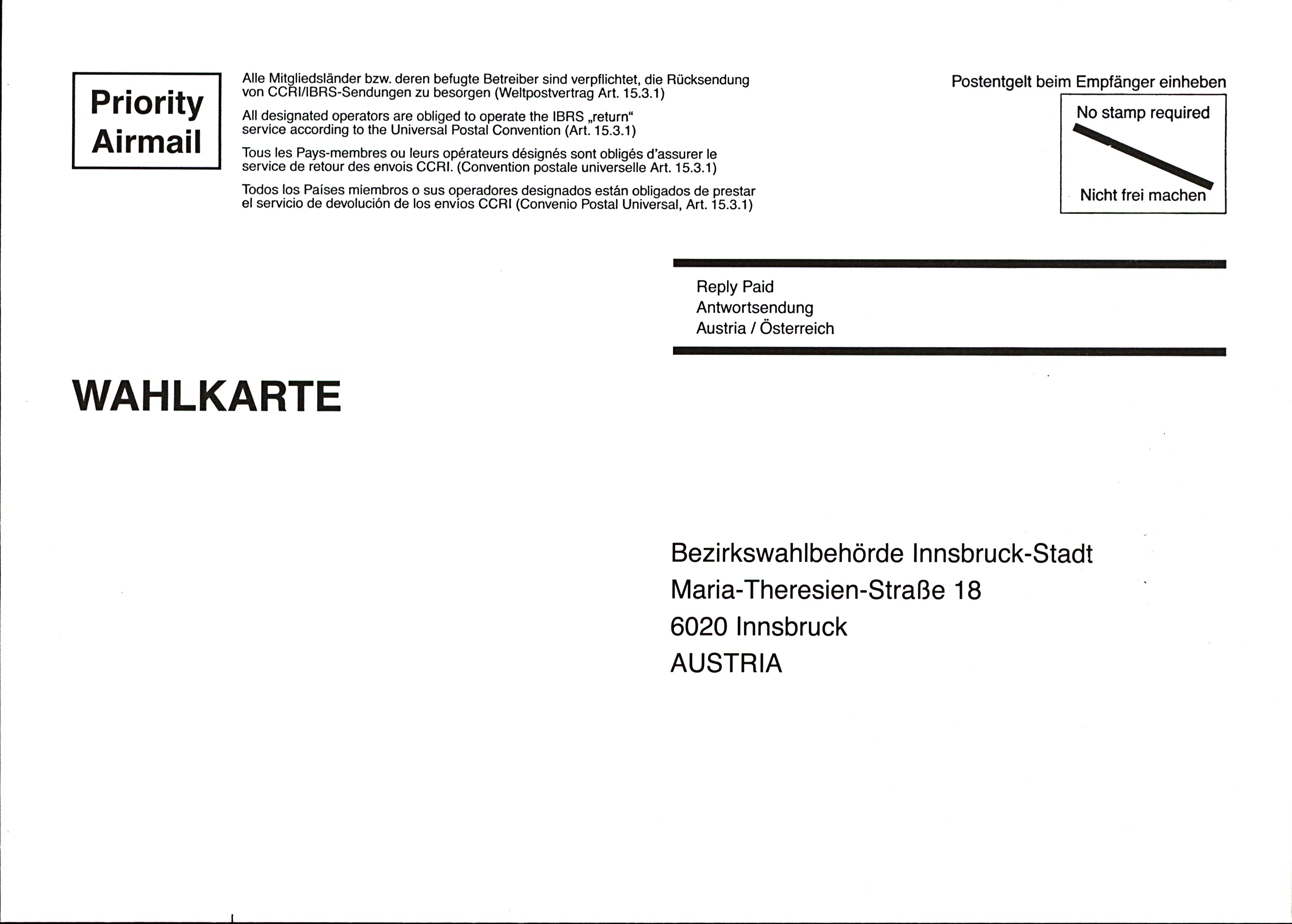
Front side of an Austrian absentee/mail ballot (2017, before the reform)

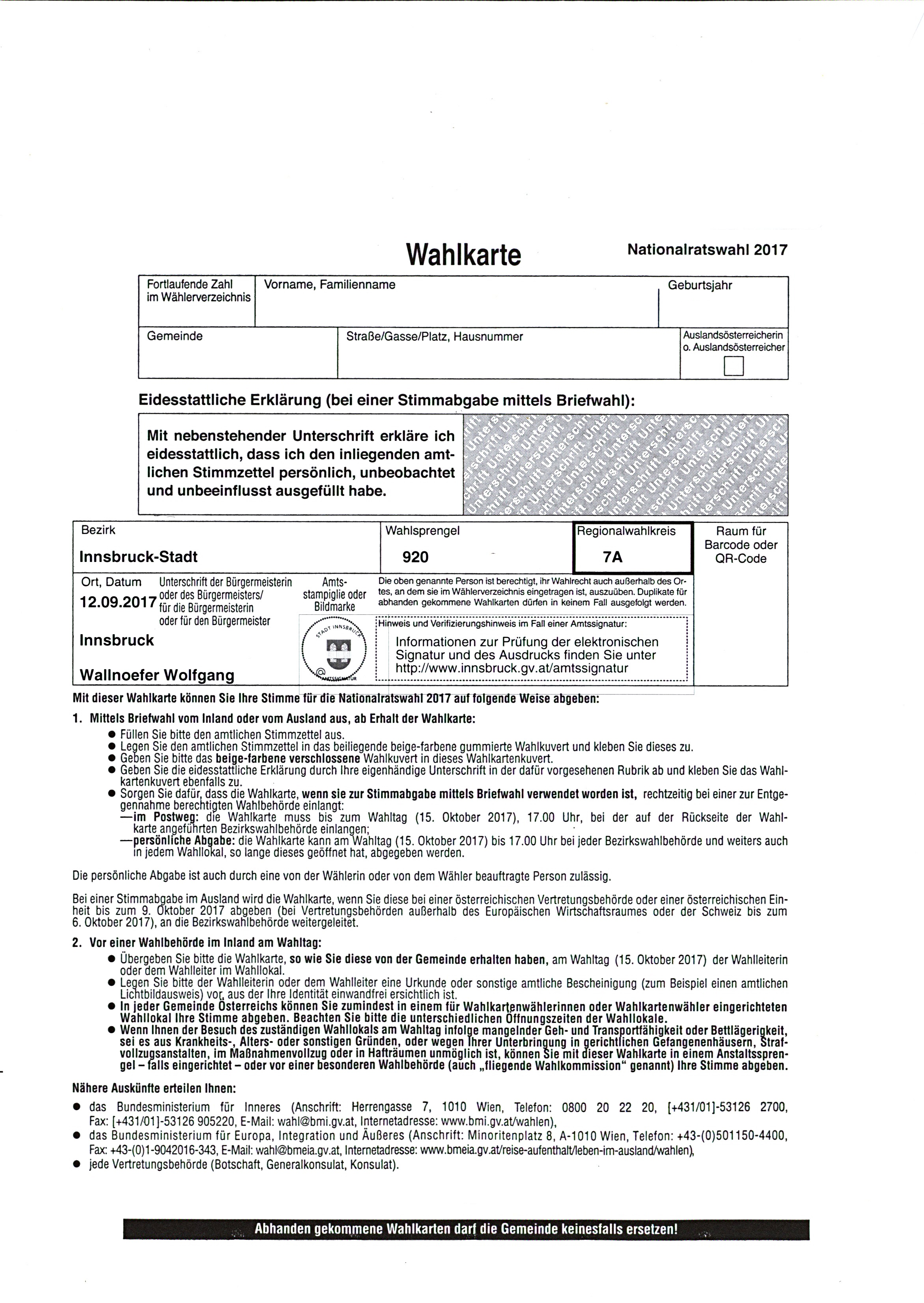
Back side of an Austrian absentee/mail ballot (2017, before the reform)

== Statistics ==
According to final numbers from the Federal Ministry of the Interior, a total of 6,346,059 people were eligible to vote in the election. In the 2019 election, 6,396,812 people were eligible to vote, so the number of eligible voters fell by 50,753 people. This is because the number of Austrian citizens has been falling for years due to a birth deficit and negative migration balance to abroad, which is not compensated for by the number of naturalizations. The final number of eligible voters was published on 27 September 2024 after a period for objections and the correction of the electoral rolls.

Absentee/mail ballots were sent to voters who requested them, starting 2 September 2024. Early voting in every municipality was also possible from that day, by immediately casting absentee ballots there (after requesting them at the municipal election department).

Electoral authorities all over Austria issued a total of 1,436,240 absentee ballots by 27 September 2024, the last day to request one. This is a new record and much higher than the 1,070,933 issued for the 2019 election. In total, about 23% of all eligible voters requested an absentee ballot, compared to 17% in 2019. The Ministry of the Interior projected that every fourth vote cast in this election would be absentee.

== Contesting parties ==
Any party that intends to be on the ballot for the election must submit a statement of candidacy, its candidate list, a filing fee of €435 and either the signatures of three members of the Austrian National Council, or sufficient petition signatures of eligible Austrian voters by 1 August 2024 at 17:00 at the federal election commission in the Austrian Interior Ministry. To be on the ballot in all nine states, 2,600 signatures are required, with individual states requiring between 100 and 500 signatures. Parties contesting the election in only some states only need to reach the signature threshold for those states.

The table below lists parties represented in the 27th National Council:
Abbr.	Name	Ideology	Leader	2019 result		Status
Abbr.	Name	Ideology	Leader	Votes (%)	Seats	Status
ÖVP	Austrian People's Party; Österreichische Volkspartei	Christian democracy	Karl Nehammer	37.5%	71 / 183	Coalition
SPÖ	Social Democratic Party of Austria; Sozialdemokratische Partei Österreichs	Social democracy	Andreas Babler	21.2%	40 / 183	Opposition
FPÖ	Freedom Party of Austria; Freiheitliche Partei Österreichs	Right-wing populism	Herbert Kickl	16.2%	31 / 183	Opposition
Grüne	The Greens; Die Grünen	Green politics	Werner Kogler	13.9%	26 / 183	Coalition
NEOS	NEOS; NEOS – Das Neue Österreich	Liberalism	Beate Meinl-Reisinger	8.1%	15 / 183	Opposition

The following other parties have announced their candidacy, are currently not represented in the National Council, but have collected the required amount of signatures to be on the ballot nationwide:

- KPÖ: Communist Party of Austria (Kommunistische Partei Österreichs)
- BIER: The Beer Party (Bin In Einer Reformbewegung)
- LMP: Madeleine Petrovic List (Liste Madeleine Petrovic)
- KEINE: None of the above (Keine von denen) (note: the party Der Wandel – (Change) decided to run as None of the above, with the abbreviation KEINE on the ballot)
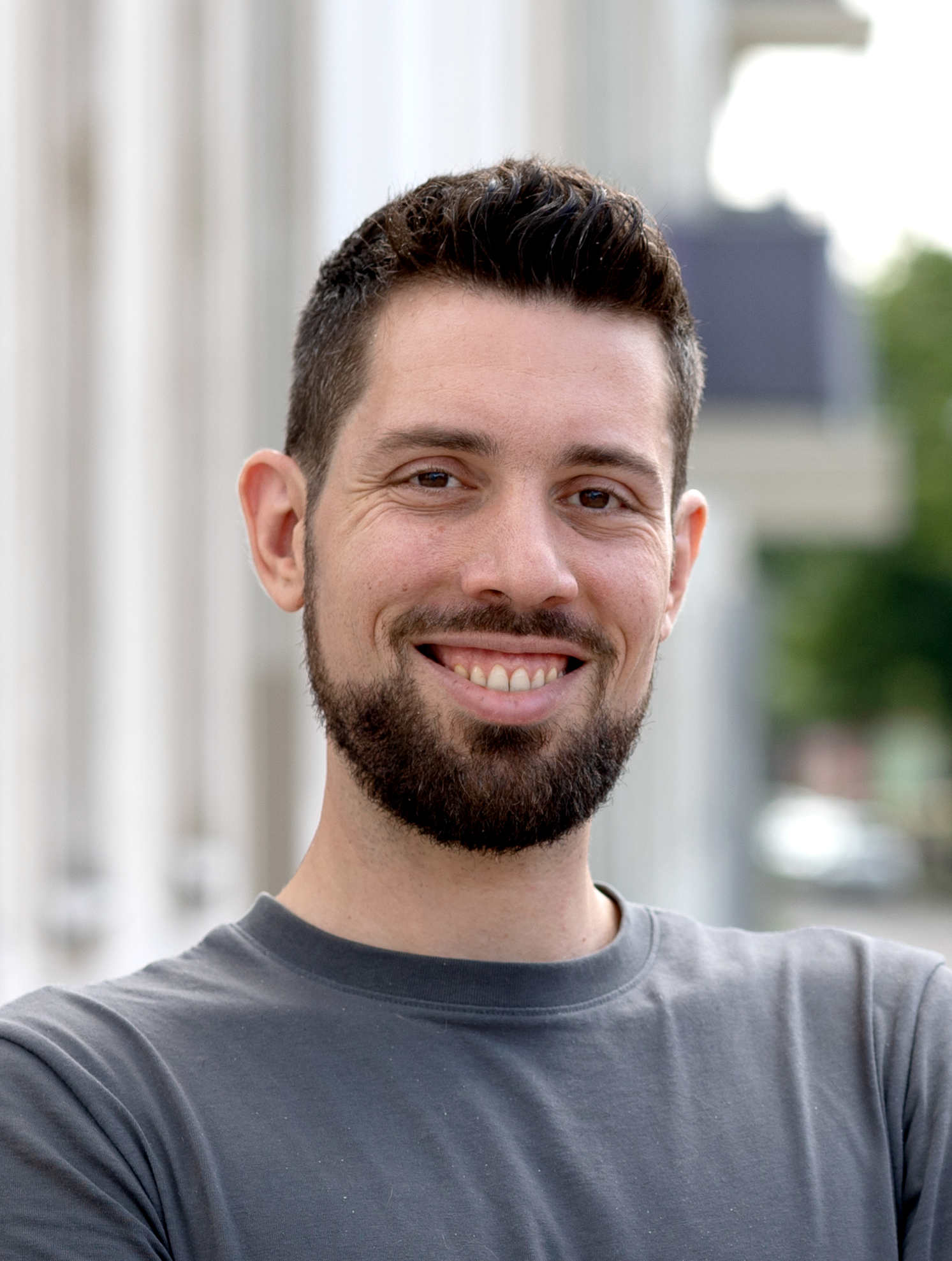
KPÖ lead candidate
Tobias Schweiger

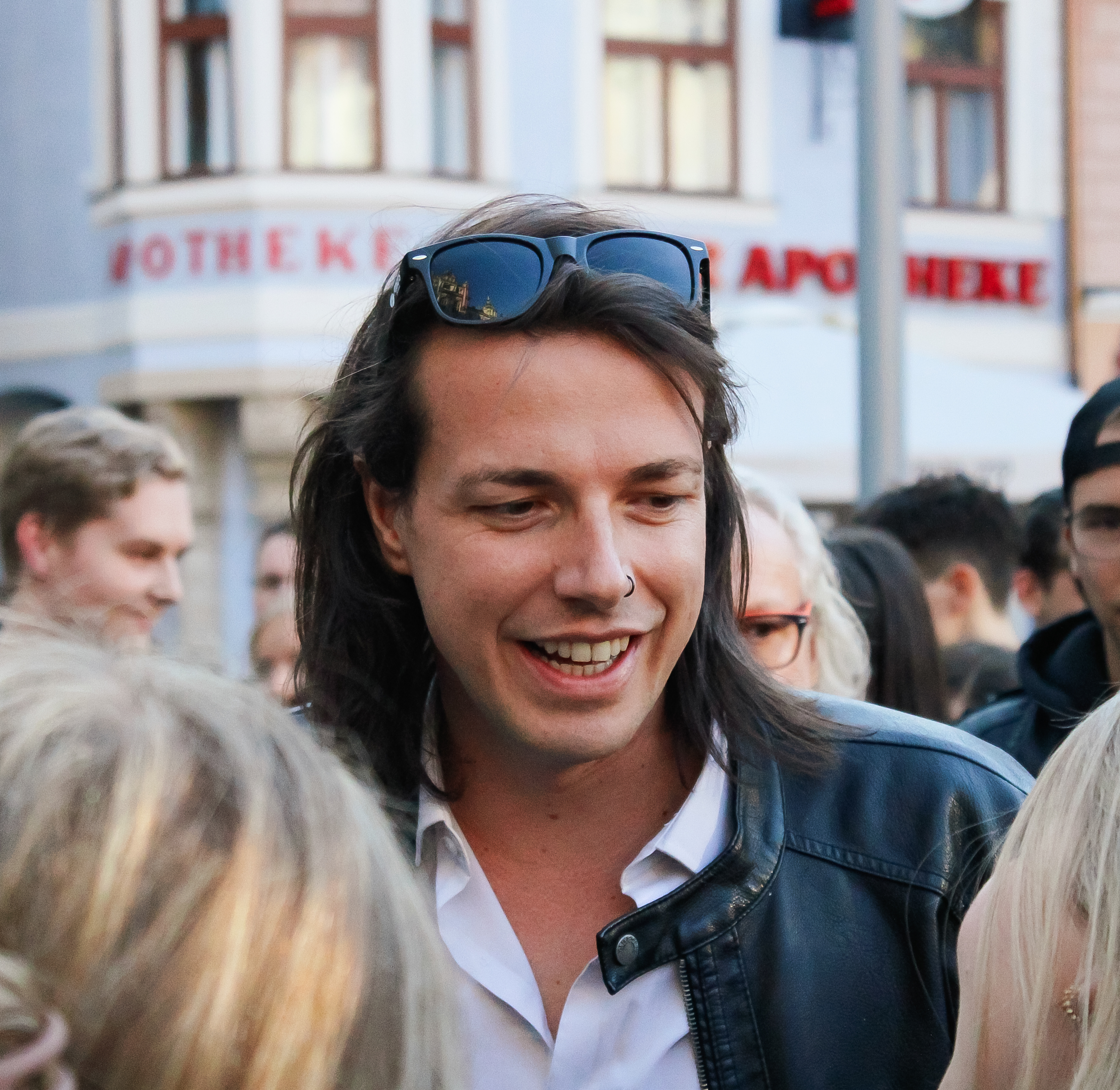
BIER lead candidate
Dominik Wlazny
(alias Marco Pogo)

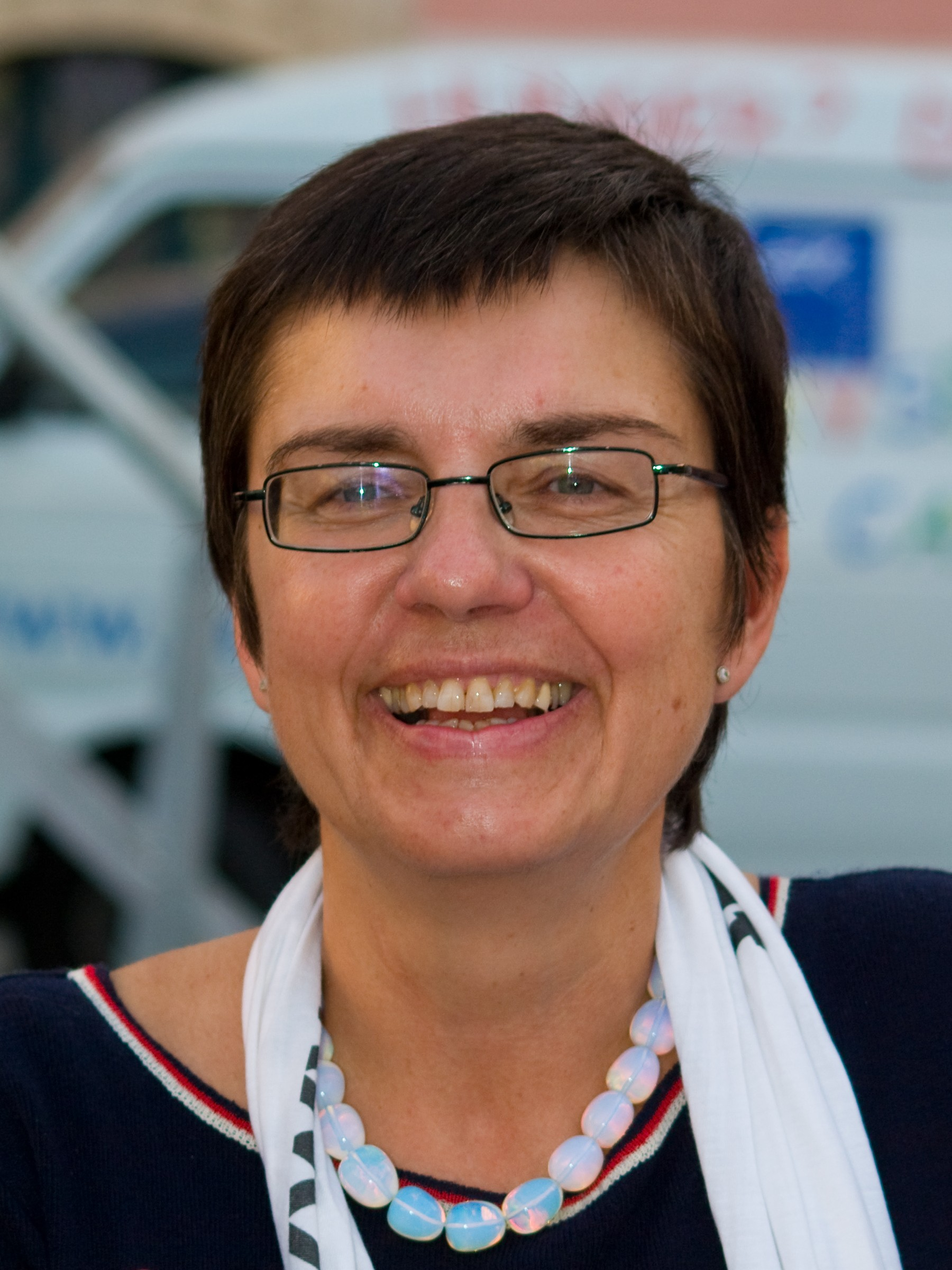
LMP lead candidate
Madeleine Petrovic

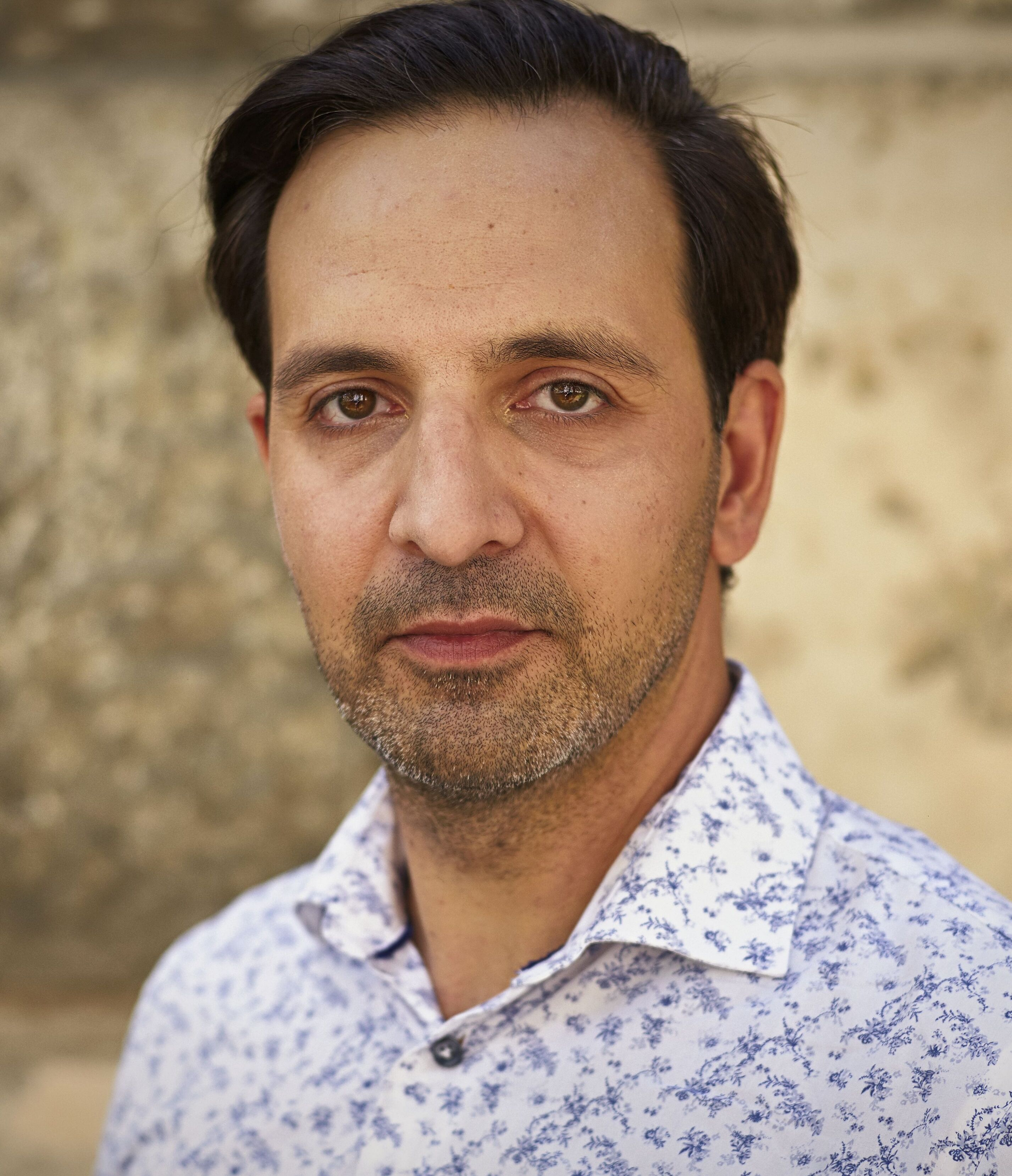
KEINE lead candidate
Fayad Mulla

The following other parties have announced their candidacy, are currently not represented in the National Council, but have collected the required amount of signatures to be on the ballot in at least one state:

- MFG Austria – People Freedom Fundamental Rights, in Vorarlberg, Tyrol, Salzburg, Styria, Upper Austria, Lower Austria & Vienna
- Liste Gaza (Gaza List), in Vorarlberg, Tyrol, Styria, Upper Austria, Lower Austria, Vienna & Burgenland
- BGE: The Yellows (Die Gelben), in Burgenland

MFG Austria were on the ballot for states including about 90% of eligible voters, only being absent in Burgenland and Carinthia. The Gaza List were on the ballot for states including about 87% of eligible voters, only being absent in Carinthia and Salzburg. The Yellows are only on the ballot in Burgenland, which includes about 4% of eligible voters in Austria.

The following other parties have ruled out a candidacy:

- DNA: Democratic – Neutral – Authentic (Demokratisch – Neutral – Authentisch)

== Campaign ==
All major parties started their election campaigns in mid-to-late August 2024. First waves of election billboards and campaign posters were placed at heavily frequented places and roads, lead candidates appeared in TV interviews and discussions and ads on social media, radio and TV were launched. Each party can spend a maximum of 8.6 million euros for the election, in accordance with campaign finance laws.

Especially after the 2024 Vienna terrorism plot in early August 2024, in which the Islamic State unsuccessfully tried to target concerts of the American singer-songwriter Taylor Swift, the campaigning shifted heavily towards security and policing issues, how to tackle political and extremist Islam in Austria and on immigration and the integration of (primarily Muslim) immigrants in Austria. The focus on these topics were reinforced by the 2024 Solingen stabbing in late August 2024 in neighboring Germany, with the FPÖ calling for "zero asylum" in Austria, increased deportations of criminal foreigners to their home countries and a new law to ban political/extremist Islam in Austria, similar to Austria's anti-Nazi law in its campaign program titled "Fortress Austria". The FPÖ also called for enshrining legal recognitions of binary genders in the constitution, restoring some political powers from the European Union to Austria, ending sanctions against Russia and Austria's exit from the European Sky Shield Initiative. The FPÖ also heavily emphasised remigration, particularly to Islamic countries, during its campaign.

The SPÖ and the ÖVP both attacked Herbert Kickl, with its leaders describing him as "a threat to democracy" and a "security risk". Both parties pledged not to join a government led by the FPÖ, although Karl Nehammer has not ruled out forming a coalition with the FPÖ that would exclude Kickl from the cabinet.

The FPÖ's use of the term Volkskanzler (People's Chancellor) to describe Kickl in its campaign material has caused criticism among some Austrians for its usage by Adolf Hitler in the 1930s and as a reminder of the FPÖ's origins as a party founded by former Nazis in the 1950s.

The ÖVP campaigned on a platform of stability. It also pledged to implement tighter immigration laws and tax cuts.

== Results ==
Party	Votes	%	+/–	Seats	+/–
Freedom Party of Austria	1,408,514	28.85	+12.68	57	+26
Austrian People's Party	1,282,734	26.27	–11.19	51	–20
Social Democratic Party of Austria	1,032,234	21.14	–0.04	41	+1
NEOS	446,378	9.14	+1.04	18	+3
The Greens	402,107	8.24	–5.66	16	–10
KPÖ Plus	116,891	2.39	+1.70	0	0
The Beer Party	98,395	2.02	+1.92	0	0
Madeleine Petrovic List	28,488	0.58	New	0	New
None of the Above	27,830	0.57	+0.11	0	0
MFG Austria	19,785	0.41	New	0	New
Liste Gaza	19,376	0.40	New	0	New
The Yellows (LBL)	156	0.00	New	0	New
Total	4,882,888	100.00	–	183	0
Valid votes	4,882,888	99.05			
Invalid/blank votes	46,857	0.95			
Total votes	4,929,745	100.00			
Registered voters/turnout	6,346,059	77.68			
Source: Interior Ministry, ORF

=== Results by state ===
States shaded by the parties' result

State	FPÖ		ÖVP		SPÖ		NEOS		Grüne		Others		Turnout
State	%	S	%	S	%	S	%	S	%	S	%	S	Turnout
Burgenland	28.8	2	28.6	1	27.0	1	6.5	-	4.7	-	4.4	-	82.5
Carinthia	38.4	4	20.8	2	23.1	2	7.8	-	4.7	-	5.2	-	76.9
Lower Austria	29.2	10	29.9	11	20.2	7	8.5	3	6.7	2	5.5	-	82.0
Upper Austria	30.5	9	26.3	8	20.3	6	8.3	2	8.4	2	6.2	-	80.1
Salzburg	27.7	3	31.6	3	16.8	1	9.0	-	8.5	-	6.4	-	78.4
Styria	32.2	8	27.0	7	18.6	5	8.2	2	7.6	2	6.4	-	78.5
Tyrol	28.7	4	31.0	4	15.4	2	10.6	1	8.1	1	6.2	-	74.3
Vorarlberg	27.1	2	29.1	2	13.1	1	12.6	1	11.4	-	6.7	-	71.8
Vienna	20.7	6	17.4	5	29.9	9	11.4	3	12.3	4	8.3	-	71.9
Nationwide	—N/a	9	—N/a	8	—N/a	7	—N/a	6	—N/a	5	—N/a	-	—N/a
Austria	28.8	57	26.3	51	21.1	41	9.1	18	8.2	16	6.4	-	77.7

According to experts from Foresight (ex-SORA), about 90 percent of the 1.436 million requested absentee ballots will be returned for counting. Of those roughly 1.3 million ballots, the vast majority (roughly 1.1 million, or 85%) would be counted on 29 September, while an estimated remaining 15% or 160,000 late-arriving absentee ballots would be counted – by law – on 30 September and an additional 40,000 (from another district than the voters' own) would be counted – by law – on 3 October. Reports of polling stations throughout election day suggested that overall turnout was "very high" and could reach "80 percent or more".

=== Preference votes ===
Alongside votes for a party, voters were able to cast a preferential votes for a candidate on the party list. The ten candidates with the most preferential votes on a federal level were as follows:

Party	Pos.	Candidate	Votes	%
FPÖ	1	Herbert Kickl	85,542	68.0
ÖVP	1	Karl Nehammer	60,402	56.1
SPÖ	1	Andreas Babler	46,440	46.0
GRÜNE	2	Leonore Gewessler	31,244	52.6
NEOS	1	Beate Meinl-Reisinger	15,880	43.5
GRÜNE	3	Alma Zadić	10,034	16.9
FPÖ	77	Christoph Steiner	9,385	7.5
NEOS	3	Sepp Schellhorn	7,852	21.5
ÖVP	2	Claudia Plakolm	7,829	7.3
GRÜNE	1	Werner Kogler	7,569	12.7
ÖVP	9	Norbert Totschnig	6,514	6.1

== Aftermath ==
Celebrations broke out among FPÖ supporters after initial projections showed them winning a plurality of votes. FPÖ general secretary Michael Schnedlitz said "the men and women of Austria have made history today", while Herbert Kickl called on other parties to reconsider forming a coalition with his party. In response, Karl Nehammer reiterated that the ÖVP would not enter into a coalition with the FPÖ unless Kickl was excluded from a ministerial position. Nehammer also said he was "bitter" over the ÖVP failing to win but acknowledged his role in improving the party's showing following low opinion ratings.

A protest was held outside the Austrian Parliament Building in Vienna by around 300 people protesting against Kickl on 29 September, calling him a "Nazi". The leaders of far-right parties across Europe, including Hungarian Prime Minister Viktor Orbán, Marine Le Pen of the National Rally in France, Matteo Salvini of the League in Italy, Santiago Abascal of Vox in Spain, Geert Wilders of the Party for Freedom in the Netherlands, and Alice Weidel of the Alternative for Germany, sent congratulations to Kickl and the FPÖ.

In the first poll after the election, Market-Lazarsfeld for Ö24 found that the FPÖ was supported by 30%, the ÖVP by 25%, the SPÖ by 20%, NEOS by 11%, the Green Party by 8%, and others by 6% of voters. A plurality of voters preferred a coalition by FPÖ-ÖVP (29%), followed by ÖVP-SPÖ-NEOS (23%), ÖVP-SPÖ-Greens (12%), ÖVP-SPÖ (9%), FPÖ-SPÖ (9%), other coalitions (3%), and 15% undecided. Another new poll after the election by Unique Research for Heute found that 58% of Austrians want the Austrian president to officially task the FPÖ with forming the next government, while 36% were opposed. Among FPÖ voters, 98% were in favour, among ÖVP voters the support was at 54%, and 44% were opposed. Among all other party voters, opposition outweighed support.

=== Government formation ===
President Alexander Van der Bellen pledged to ensure the formation of a government that respects the "foundations of our liberal democracy". Although it is a convention that the president first asks the leader of the largest party to try to form a government, the constitution does not require them to do so. Van der Bellen previously stated that he might not give FPÖ this mandate in the event of their victory. On 2 October, the outgoing ÖVP-Green government tendered its resignation, although it was asked to stay on in a caretaker role by Van der Bellen. The president then started official talks with all party leaders on 4 October, with FPÖ leader Kickl being the first to talk with the president. Van der Bellen and Kickl made no statements after their meeting but Kickl said he would do so on 5 October. Nehammer and other ÖVP governors expressed support for the FPÖ receiving the first mandate to form a government, citing a wish to preserve the convention.

The president spoke on 7 October with Nehammer (ÖVP) and Babler (SPÖ)—who also met with each other the next day—and on 8 October with Meinl-Reisinger (NEOS) and Kogler (Greens). Babler had previously ruled out a coalition government with ÖVP, but backtracked. After these initial talks with each party leader, Van der Bellen said he asked the party leaders to "sort things out on their own" until 18 October rather than tasking the FPÖ with the mandate to form the next government. Van der Bellen said that the situation is unique in the sense that no other party wants to cooperate with the FPÖ and that it would be ludicrous to order the FPÖ to form a government in this situation. Instead, Van der Bellen ordered the parties to keep talking with each other until a credible path to a government appears, after which he would task the leading party of this constellation to form the next government. Meanwhile, the FPÖ rose to a new high of 33% in a new Market-Lazarsfeld poll for Ö24, with the ÖVP holding at 26% and the SPÖ falling slightly to 19% (below 20% for the first time); the minor parties held fairly steady: NEOS at 10%, the Green Party at 7%, KPÖ at 2%, and others at 3%.

After the FPÖ–ÖVP–SPÖ talks concluded on 16 October, Nehammer reiterated his opposition to a government with Kickl, who insisted to lead the next government himself as Chancellor. Nehammer said "Kickl is unable to govern," adding that he was a "security threat for the country" and that "Nehammer and the ÖVP are not willing to be the stirrup holders of Kickl and the FPÖ." On the other hand, Kickl called Nehammer "an offended and aggrieved sore loser, whose main goal is to continue clinging to power, but without the interests of the country and voters in mind."

On 22 October, Van der Bellen officially asked Nehammer to form the next government and negotiate with the SPÖ. Van der Bellen said that it was clear that Kickl "would not be able to find a coalition partner who would make him Chancellor," while Kickl criticised Van der Bellen for breaking with the "tried and tested normal processes" of asking the leading party in the election to form a government and pledged, "Today is not the end of the story." Nehammer said that he would need to find a third coalition partner to ensure a stable parliamentary majority. An ÖVP–SPÖ coalition would only have a majority of one seat in the National Council, which would be impractical for daily government work, as any member would have the power to block proceedings.

On 25 October, Nehammer and the ÖVP officially launched first exploration talks with Babler and the SPÖ. Nehammer also talked with NEOS and Green delegations to try to find a third coalition partner. After the talks, Nehammer said that the "road to a new government will be long and stony" because of the "massive policy differences between the parties involved."

==== Failed ÖVP-SPÖ-NEOS coalition negotiations ====
On 12 November, the centre-right ÖVP and the center-left SPÖ announced they would start coalition talks with the liberal NEOS. The talks started on 18 November.

On 3 January 2025, various Austrian media outlets reported that NEOS had withdrawn from coalition talks, leaving it unclear how government negotiations would move forward. It was reported that the Green Party could be asked to join negotiations or that negotiations between only the FPÖ and ÖVP or FPÖ and SPÖ could start instead. Alternatively, new elections could be called.

On 4 January, after consultations with President Van der Bellen, ÖVP and SPÖ continued coalition talks without any other party. However, Nehammer resigned as chancellor and ÖVP leader later that same day after concluding that no agreement was possible.

Nehammer was replaced by Christian Stocker as interim ÖVP leader the same day, and his resignation as chancellor took effect on 10 January. When asked why he was resigning before then, he said only it was a step he did not want to take. In a statement, Nehammer said his ultimate goal was to keep Kickl out of the chancellor's office "because I have always been of the opinion that his understanding of the office [and] the way he lives politics is not good for our country", though there were "many reasons" why he failed.

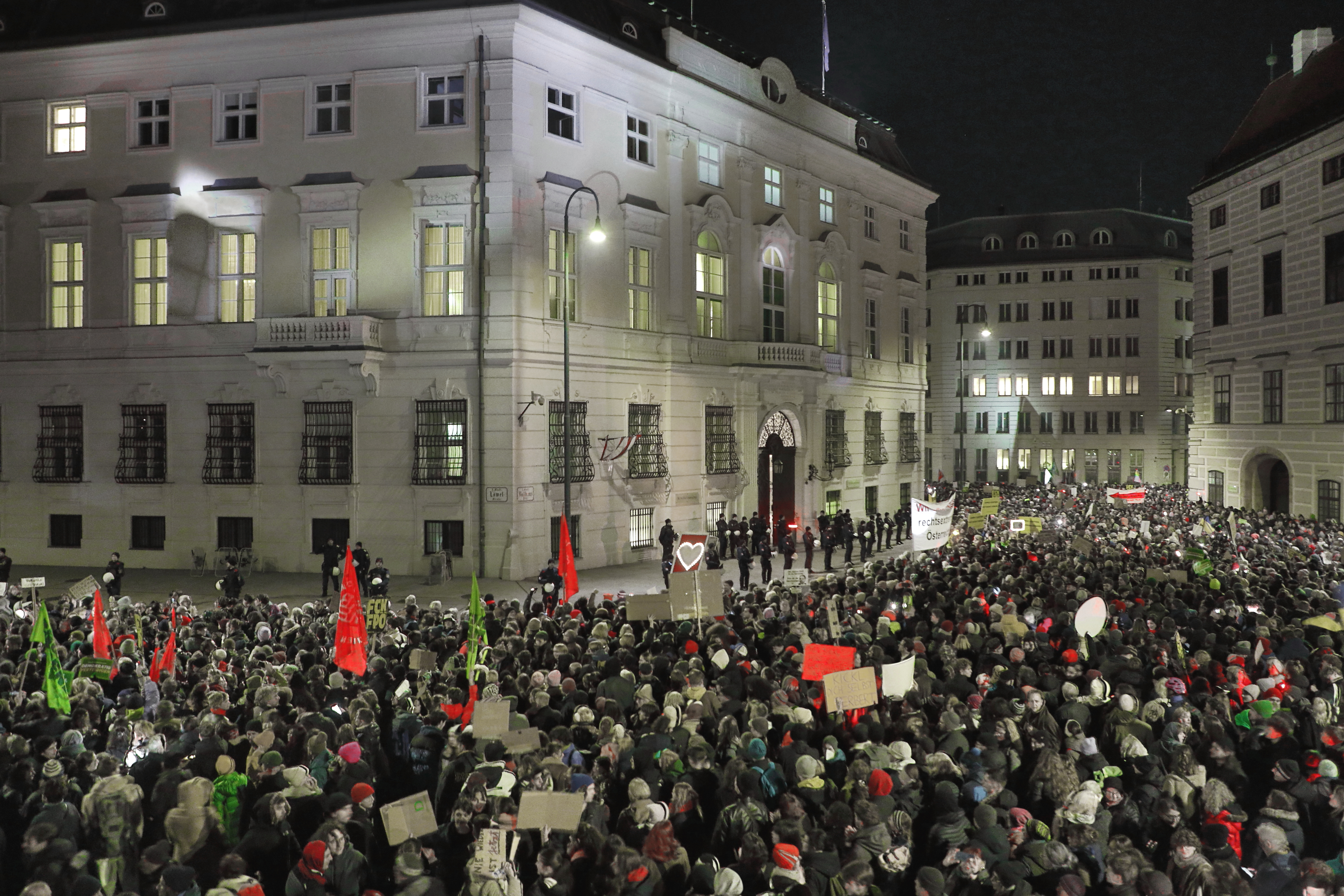
Demonstration against FPÖ participation in government in front of the Federal Chancellery on January 9, 2025 in Vienna

==== Failed FPÖ-ÖVP coalition negotiations ====
On 6 January, President Van der Bellen formally tasked FPÖ leader Herbert Kickl to form a government. The coalition talks continued through February, with no reported breakthrough. The FPÖ and ÖVP negotiated for over a month about forming a new government.

The FPÖ advocated for substantial tax cuts, increased public borrowing and reduced contributions to EU-wide financial mechanisms. These policies clashed with the ÖVP, which remained committed to fiscal discipline and adherence to EU economic frameworks. Additionally, the FPÖ's Russia-friendly stance and Eurosceptic views clashed with the ÖVP's pro-European and pro-NATO alignment.

On 12 February, Kickl announced after a meeting with President Alexander Van der Bellen in Vienna that the negotiations had failed. The parties had argued primarily about the distribution of ministries, because both sides wanted to take over the Ministry of the Interior and the Ministry of Finance. According to Christian Stocker, the ÖVP wanted to retain control over the finance and interior ministries to secure a “defensible constitutional state” and ensure cooperation with international intelligence services.

==== Successful ÖVP-SPÖ-NEOS coalition negotiations ====
On 22 February, after a week of exploration talks, the three parties informed President Van der Bellen that they would try to create a joint government again. The negotiations were already in its final stages, because most topics had already been agreed on during their previous failed negotiations and even some measures from the FPÖ-ÖVP negotiations, such as the planned budget consolidation for 2025, were likely to be adopted.

On 27 February, the leaders of the three parties announced that they had come to a coalition agreement. The agreement was subjected to a vote of NEOS party members on 2 March, passing with 94% of the vote. The coalition will have 110 deputies, greater than the 92 needed for a majority.

On 3 March, President Van der Bellen officially swore in the new three-party coalition government. Christian Stocker of the ÖVP took office as Chancellor, while Andreas Babler of the SPÖ was appointed Vice Chancellor, and Beate Meinl-Reisinger of NEOS assumed the role of Foreign Minister. In his remarks, Van der Bellen praised the coalition for putting the national interest above party divisions, stating, "Good things come to those who wait."
