= Christoph Steiner =

Austrian politician (born 1988)

Member of the National Council
- Incumbent
- Assumed office 24 October 2024
- Constituency: Innsbruck Rural

Member of the Federal Council
- In office 28 March 2018 – 23 October 2024
- Succeeded by: Irene Partl

Personal details
- Born: 6 December 1988 (age 37)
- Party: Freedom Party

Christoph Steiner (born 6 December 1988) is an Austrian politician of the Freedom Party. He was elected member of the National Council in the 2024 legislative election, and was a member of the Federal Council from 2018 to 2024.
