= Der Wandel =

Left-wing Austrian political party

Wandel
- Leader: Fayad Mulla
- Founded: 7 September 2012
- Headquarters: Stuckgasse 9/1b, Vienna
- Ideology: Progressivism; Egalitarianism; Post-capitalism; Environmentalism; Pro-Europeanism
- Political position: Left-wing
- European affiliation: Party of the European Left (partner)
- European political alliance: Democracy in Europe Movement 2025

Website
- https://www.derwandel.at/

Wandel (English: Change) is a left-wing and progressive political party in Austria led by Fayad Mulla. It is part of the pan-European coalition DiEM25.

== Background ==
The party was launched in 2012 as a progressive, anti-capitalist and egalitarian movement. Its positions are detailed in the "Demokratische Moderne (English: Democratic Modernity)" manifesto, which emphasizes on abolishing global capitalism and establishing a democratic economy, fair to all people. Despite being anti-capitalist, the party's leader has stated that the party does not support socialism either, but rather seeks to take some elements from both socialism and capitalism in order to create a new alternative system, tentatively called "neo-socialism", which shares characteristics with the socioeconomic concept of economic democracy.

== Positions and proposals ==
The party's proposals include:

- Replacing the Federal Council with a Citizens' Council, where half of the seats will be reserved for women, and all members will be elected by lot for a one-year term. The Citizens' Council would have the power to reject laws passed by the National Council and call new elections by a corresponding majority, and would have to vote whether to approve constitutional amendments.
- An eventual shift to a 21-hour work week
- A 1:5 wage ratio (where the lowest income an individual can make is €2000/month and the maximum is €10000/month after taxes)
- A national citizens' dividend
- Mandating that employees elect company leaders
- A Green New Deal
- Full nationalisation of services which impact social care, such as education, health, pensions, security, banking, and infrastructure
- The creation of the United States of Europe
- Making all media sources adhere to a non-profit model, obtaining finances only through consumers and state media funding
- Placing less focus on GDP as a measurement, instead focusing more on elements of public well-being such as health, scientific achievements, education levels, economic output, wage rates, democratic participation, social cohesion, ecological stability, and safety
- A national job guarantee
- A cap on the amount of assets/wealth one individual can accumulate
- Equal pay for equal work
- Anti-trust action against private monopolies
- A ban on speculation in currencies, commodities and food; a minimum holding period for shares of stock; the addition of a financial transaction tax
- Creation of a Future and Prosperity Fund, funded by business income taxes and the financial transaction tax. All citizens would receive a permanent share in the fund, and would receive a guaranteed annual profit. The Board of the fund will be directly elected.

== Elections and Electoral History ==
=== 2013 Austrian legislative election ===
Participating only in Vienna and Upper Austria, the party obtained 0.07% of the vote.

=== 2014 European Parliament election ===
As part of the Europa anders coalition with the KPÖ, Pirate Party, and independents, they received a combined 2.14% of the vote, which was not enough to receive a seat.

=== 2019 European Parliament election ===
In November 2018, the party announced an alliance with Yanis Varoufakis' DiEM25 for the European Parliament Election. The party's political director Daniela Platsch was second on the joint list led by Varoufakis. The party did not win any seats.

=== 2019 Austrian legislative election ===
The party ran in the snap legislative elections held in September 2019, obtaining approximately 0.5% of the vote.

=== 2024 Austrian legislative election ===
In 2024 Der Wandel failed to reach an agreement with other left-wing parties to create a joint list: they had differences with the communist KPÖ over attitudes to the War in Ukraine, and the SPÖ did not agree to talks. They decided to run under the list name 'None of them' (Keine von denen, or KEINE), arguing that the FPÖ should not be the sole repository for dissatisfied voters. They received 0.6% of the vote, barely increasing their vote share compared to 2019.

== Election results ==
=== National Council ===
Election	Leader	Votes	%	Seats	+/–	Government
2013	Fayad Mulla	3,051	0.07 (#11)	0 / 183	New	Extra-parliamentary
2017	Fayad Mulla	Did not contest		0 / 183	0	Extra-parliamentary
2019	Fayad Mulla	22,168	0.46 (#9)	0 / 183	0	Extra-parliamentary
2024 (Note: Formally run as Keine von Denen (None of the above).)	Fayad Mulla	27,830	0.57 (#9)	0 / 183	0	Extra-parliamentary
