= Hans Peter Doskozil =

Austrian politician (born 1970)

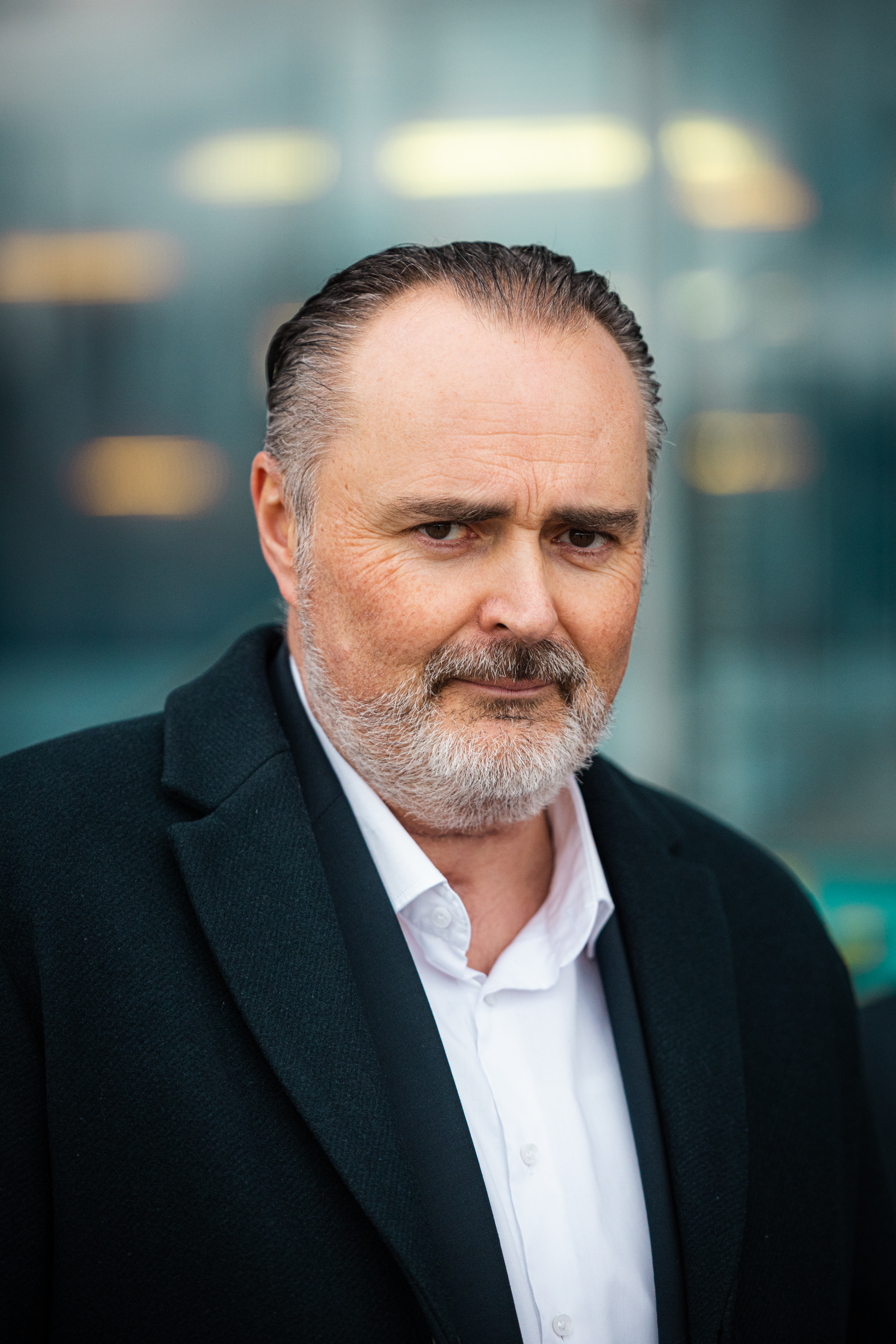
- Doskozil in 2023

Governor of Burgenland
- Incumbent
- Assumed office 28 February 2019
- Deputy: Anja Haider-Wallner
- Preceded by: Hans Niessl

Minister of Defense and Sports
- In office 28 January 2016 – 18 December 2017
- Chancellor: Werner Faymann; Christian Kern
- Preceded by: Gerald Klug
- Succeeded by: Mario Kunasek

Councilor of Finances, Infrastructure and Culture in Burgenland
- In office 21 December 2017 – 8 September 2018
- Governor: Hans Niessl

Personal details
- Born: 21 June 1970 (age 56) Vorau, Styria, Austria
- Party: Social Democratic Party
- Education: University of Vienna

Military service
- Allegiance: Austria
- Branch/service: Austrian Armed Forces
- Years of service: 1989
- Unit: Landwehrstammregiment 13 (LWSR 13)

Hans Peter Doskozil (German pronunciation: [ˈhans ˈpeːtɐ ˈdɔskotsiːl]; born 21 June 1970) is an Austrian politician of the Social Democratic Party (SPÖ) who has served as the governor of Burgenland since February 2019. He previously served as minister of defence from 2016–2017. In the 2020 Burgenland state election, he led his party to win a majority of the seats in Burgenland's parliament. Due to an error in the count of his party’s national congress in June 2023, he was assumed to be the SPÖ's party leader from 3 to 5 June 2023, when the error was discovered and his opponent Andreas Babler was declared party leader.

== Early life, education and career ==
Doskozil was raised in Kroisegg, a district in the municipality of Grafenschachen in southern Burgenland, where he completed his compulsory Volksschule education. He later attended the Hauptschule in Pinkafeld and then the Bundesgymnasium Oberschützen in the Oberwart District.

In the first-half of 1989, Doskozil did his compulsory military service at the Landwehrstammregiment 13 (now Jägerbattalion 19) of the Austrian Army and soon afterwards began his policing career as a Sicherheitswachebeamter at the Bundespolizeidirektion Wien (BPD Wien). He started studying law part-time at the University of Vienna in 1994, graduating with a Mag. iur. in 2000. Between 2003 and 2008, he regularly moved between the Sicherheitsdirektion Burgenland, BPD Wien, and the Federal Ministry of the Interior. Between 2008 and 2012, he also worked in the office of the then-governor of Burgenland Hans Niessl before returning to policing as the head of the newly formed Landespolizeidirektion Burgenland in 2012.

As head of the Landespolizeidirektion Burgenland, Doskozil was praised for his handling of the Burgenland corpses discovery in 2015.

== Political career ==
In the mid-2000s, Doskozil served as a councillor of the Grafenschachen municipality for the local chapter of the SPÖ. On migrant policy, Doskozil has at times adopted a harder line than his predecessor Gerald Klug. In 2016, he successfully introduced new asylum measures, including a process under which migrants could be turned away at the border within an hour, which could be activated if lawmakers decree public order is threatened.

As minister of defence, Doskozil increased the budget of the Austrian Armed Forces, which had halved in terms of GDP between 1985 and 2015, to a projected 1.3 billion Euros by 2020. After said budget increase, the number of interested parties for the job of a professional soldier doubled in 2017. Also during his stint as Defence Minister, the state of Austria sued Airbus and the Eurofighter consortium in 2017, alleging wilful deception and fraud linked to a near 2 billion euro ($2.1 billion) order for 18 Eurofighter Typhoon jets in 2003.

In a November 2022 poll, the SPÖ received a plurality of the votes when respondents were asked which party they would vote for under the condition that Doskozil would run as the SPÖ's candidate for chancellor of Austria. In early 2023, he challenged the incumbent SPÖ chairperson Pamela Rendi-Wagner for the chairpersonship. The party called for a vote among its members to be held before the summer in the special 2023 Social Democratic Party of Austria leadership election.

The results of the membership election were announced on 22 May 2023 and Doskozil came in first place with 33.7% of the votes. Andreas Babler and some members of the party requested a run-off among the party members be held between Doskozil and Babler who came in second place at 31.5%, but the SPÖ leadership decided in a vote of 25-22 against a runoff and that they would instead let Babler run at the extraordinary party congress on 3 June 2023 where 603 delegates voted on behalf of the party membership. According to the first count, Babler lost with 279 votes (46.81%) against Doskozil who received 316 (53.02%) of the delegates votes; however, after a recount showed that the results were incorrectly tabulated, with Babler having won the votes attributed to Doskozil, Babler was proclaimed the winner and declared the new leader of the Social Democratic Party of Austria.

== Personal life ==
Doskozil has two children from a previous marriage. His brother serves as a police officer in Vienna. Doskozil met the German-born events manager and food blogger Julia Jurtschak at an event in Cologne in 2017, began dating each other in 2019 and married in August 2022.

In 2018, Doskozil had to receive surgery on his vocal cords due to persistent hoarseness. He underwent surgery again at Vienna General Hospital in autumn 2019, and then at the University of Leipzig Medical Center in January 2021 and in October 2025.
