= Chair of the Social Democratic Party of Austria =

Leader of the Social Democratic Party of Austria

Chair of the Social Democratic Party
- Bundesparteivorsitzender der Sozialdemokratischen Partei

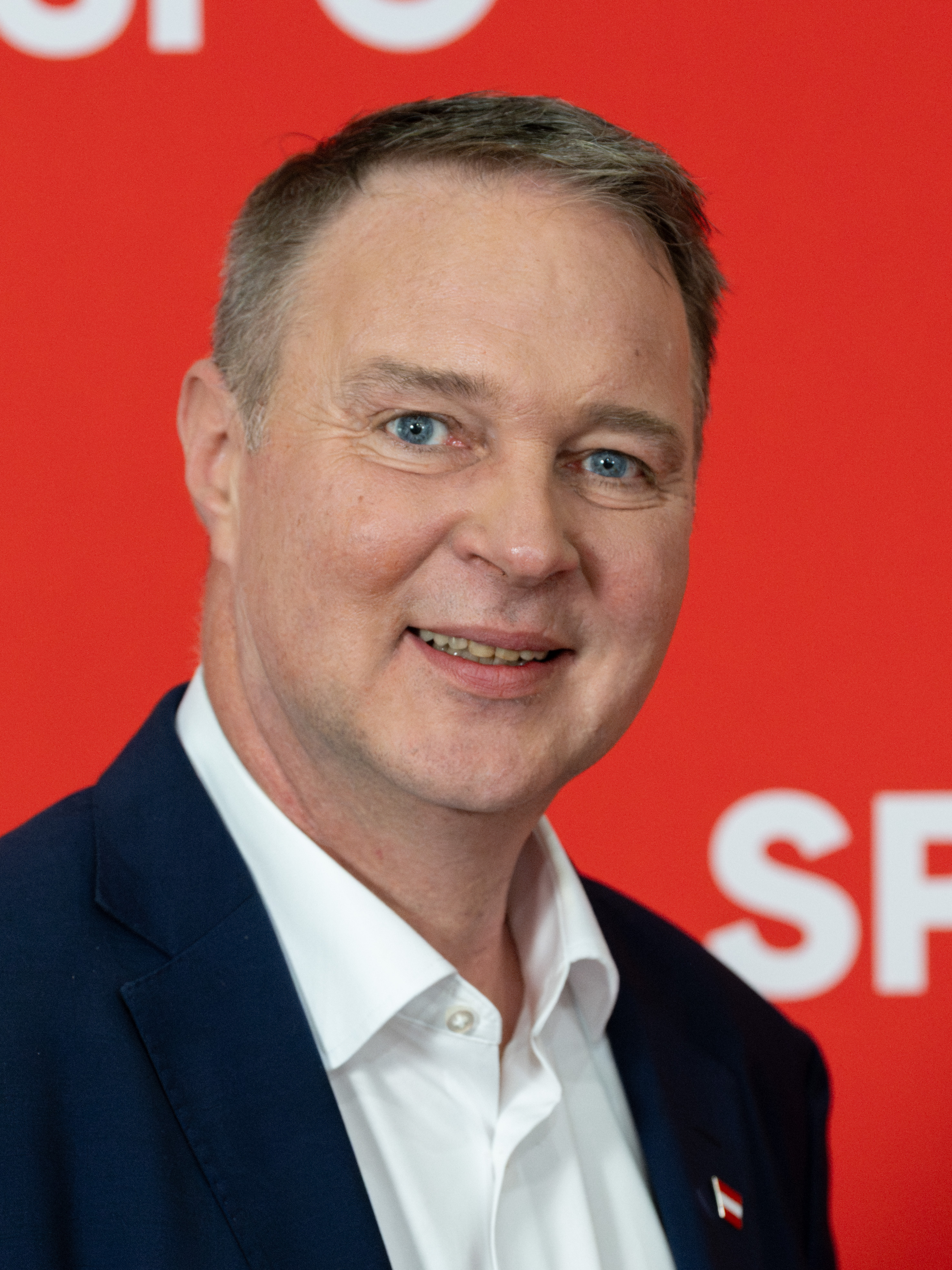
- Incumbent; Andreas Babler since 5 June 2023
- Presidium of the Social Democratic Party
- Status: Party leader
- Member of: Presidium; Executive board
- Reports to: Bundesparteitag
- Seat: Haus Löwelstraße 18, Innere Stadt, Vienna
- Appointer: Bundesparteitag
- Constituting instrument: Party statutes
- Precursor: Chairman of the SDAPÖ
- First holder: Victor Adler as Chairman of the SDAPÖ (1 January 1889); Adolf Schärf as Chairman of the SPÖ (15 December 1945)
- Website: spoe.at

This is a list of chairpersons of the Social Democratic Party of Austria in chronological order.

== Social Democratic Workers' Party (SDAPÖ) ==
Portrait	Name	Took office	Left office	Chancellor
	Victor Adler	1 January 1889	1918	Karl Renner (SDAPÖ)
	Karl Seitz	1920	1934	Karl Renner (SDAPÖ); Michael Mayr (CSP); Johann Schober; Ignaz Seipel (CSP); Rudolf Ramek (CSP); Ignaz Seipel (CSP); Ernst Streeruwitz (CSP); Johann Schober; Carl Vaugoin (CSP); Otto Ender (CSP); Karl Buresch (CSP); Engelbert Dollfuss (CSP/VP)

== Social Democratic Party (SPÖ) ==
Portrait	Name	Took office	Left office	Chancellor
	Adolf Schärf	14 April 1945	8 May 1957	Karl Renner (SPÖ); Leopold Figl (ÖVP); Julius Raab (ÖVP)
	Bruno Pittermann	8 May 1957	1 February 1967	Julius Raab (ÖVP); Alfons Gorbach (ÖVP); Josef Klaus (ÖVP)
	Bruno Kreisky	1 February 1967	27 October 1983	Himself; Fred Sinowatz (SPÖ)
	Fred Sinowatz	27 October 1983	11 May 1988	Himself; Franz Vranitzky (SPÖ)
	Franz Vranitzky	11 May 1988	9 April 1997	Himself
	Viktor Klima	9 April 1997	28 April 2000	Himself; Wolfgang Schüssel (ÖVP)
	Alfred Gusenbauer	28 April 2000	8 August 2008	Wolfgang Schüssel (ÖVP); Himself
	Werner Faymann	8 August 2008	9 May 2016	Alfred Gusenbauer (SPÖ); Himself
	Michael Häupl; Acting Chair	9 May 2016	25 June 2016	Reinhold Mitterlehner (ÖVP); Christian Kern (SPÖ)
	Christian Kern	25 June 2016	25 September 2018	Himself; Sebastian Kurz (ÖVP)
	Pamela Rendi-Wagner	25 September 2018	3 June 2023	Sebastian Kurz (ÖVP); Brigitte Bierlein (Independent Bierlein Government); Sebastian Kurz (ÖVP); Alexander Schallenberg (ÖVP); Karl Nehammer (ÖVP)
	Hans Peter Doskozil (Note: Doskozil was considered chairman on 3–5 June 2023, due to an error in the announcement of the runoff results of the 2023 Social Democratic Party of Austria leadership election.)	3 June 2023	5 June 2023	Karl Nehammer (ÖVP)
	Andreas Babler	5 June 2023	present	Karl Nehammer (ÖVP); Alexander Schallenberg (ÖVP); Christian Stocker (ÖVP)
