= Muna Duzdar =

Austrian politician (born 1978)

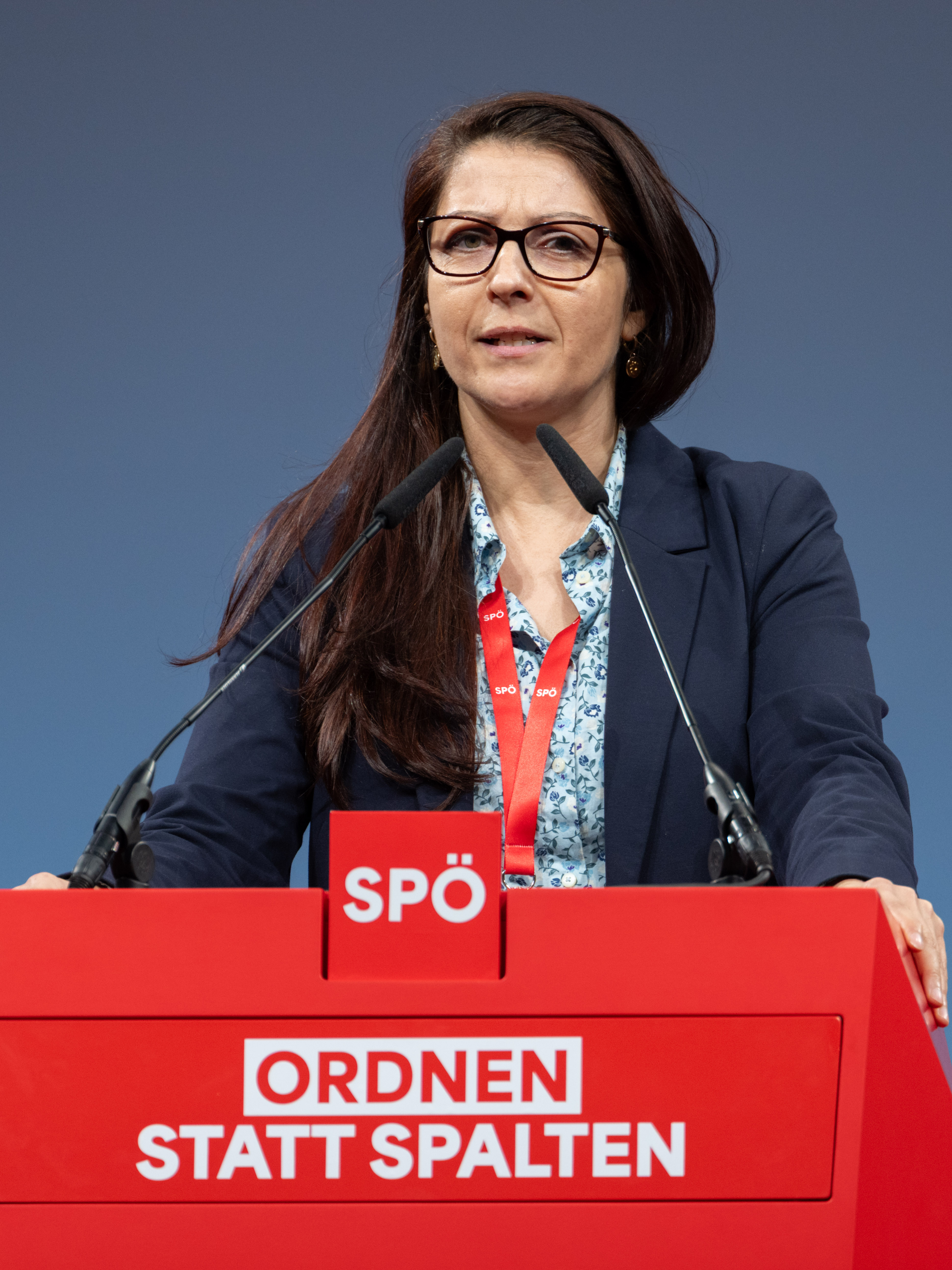

State Secretary in the Federal Chancellery
- In office 17 May 2016 – 18 December 2017
- President: Heinz Fischer; Alexander Van der Bellen
- Chancellor: Christian Kern
- Preceded by: Sonja Stessl

Personal details
- Born: 22 August 1978 (age 48) Vienna, Austria
- Party: Social Democratic Party
- Education: University of Vienna; University of Paris

Muna Duzdar (born 22 August 1978) is an Austrian politician. She was a State Secretary in the Austrian Federal Chancellery from 2016 to 2017. When she was appointed on 17 May 2016 she became the first Muslim person to hold a post in the Austrian Federal government.

== Early life and education ==
Duzdar was raised in Donaustadt, a district of Vienna, as the daughter of Palestinian immigrants. She studied law at the University of Vienna followed by postgraduate Master studies in International law at the Sorbonne University. On 9 November 2011 she passed her bar exam and has been working as a lawyer since 2012.

During her studies she was working as law secretary at the Austrian Tenants' Association from 1999 to 2001. After that she worked for the Socialist Youth Austria as international secretary until 2004. This was followed by an internship at the European Parliament from 2004 to 2005. During her Master studies she worked as foreign language assistant in two Paris suburbs, Livry-Gargan and Clichy-sous-Bois from 2005 to 2006 and then in administrative positions at the Parti Socialiste in Paris.

== Career ==
Duzdar started her political career in 2001 when she became a district councillor for Donaustadt. In 2010 she was sworn in as a member of the Federal Council where she took on the responsibility of speaker for foreign policy for the Social Democratic Party. She was also a member of several committees within the Federal Council. On 18 November 2012 Duzdar left the Federal Council and switched to the Vienna, where she was sworn in on 19 November 2012 taking over Karin Schrödl's position.

Duzdar considers foreign policy, education, integration and housing as her main political focus areas.

On 17 May 2016 Muna Duzdar was appointed as state secretary in the Federal Chancellery by Chancellor Christian Kern, who himself had assumed that position on 9 May 2016 after his predecessor Werner Faymann had stepped down. Until 2017, she was responsible for "Administration and Public Service", as well as "Diversity and Digitalization". She was elected into the National Council for the Social Democratic Party in 2017, after she was discharged as State secretary by the newly elected ÖVP-FPÖ government.

== Personal life ==
Duzdar's parents are Palestinian immigrants. Her father was an employee of UNIDO, her mother was a housewife. She has five siblings and her native languages are German and Arabic. She describes herself as a non-practicing Muslima, which makes her the first member of the Austrian federal government that belongs to the Muslim faith.

Duzdar was also the president of the Palestinian-Austrian Association.
