= Next Austrian legislative election =

- By 2029

All 183 seats in the National Council 92 seats needed for a majority
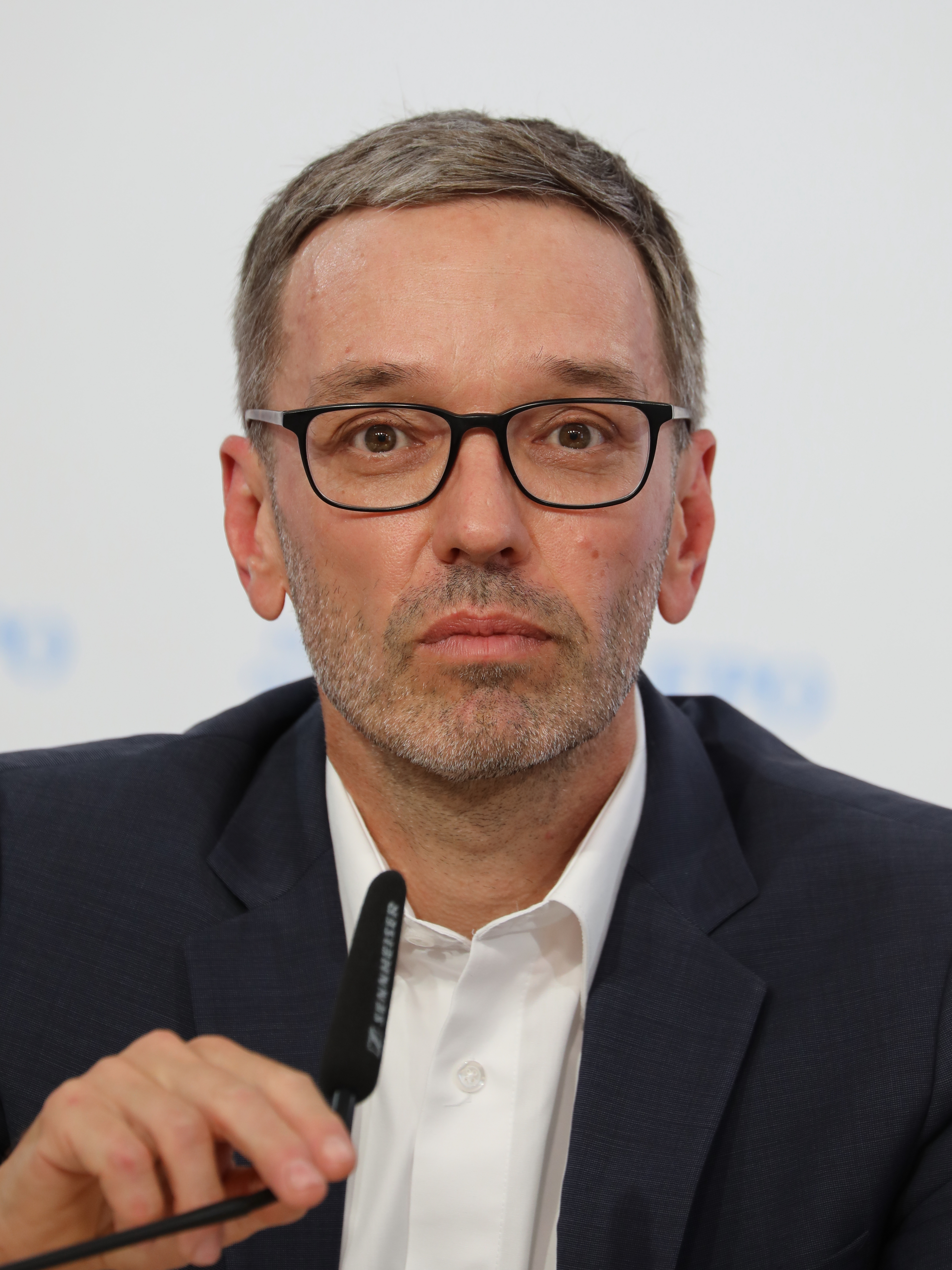

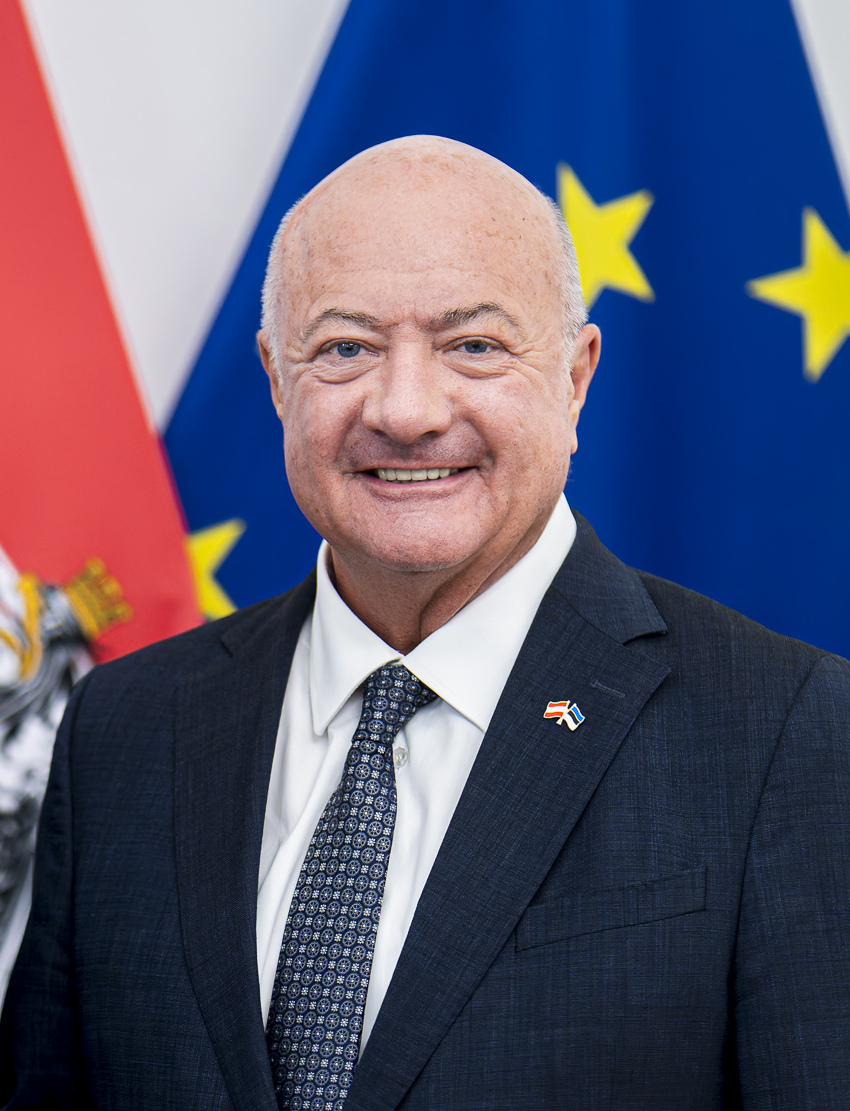

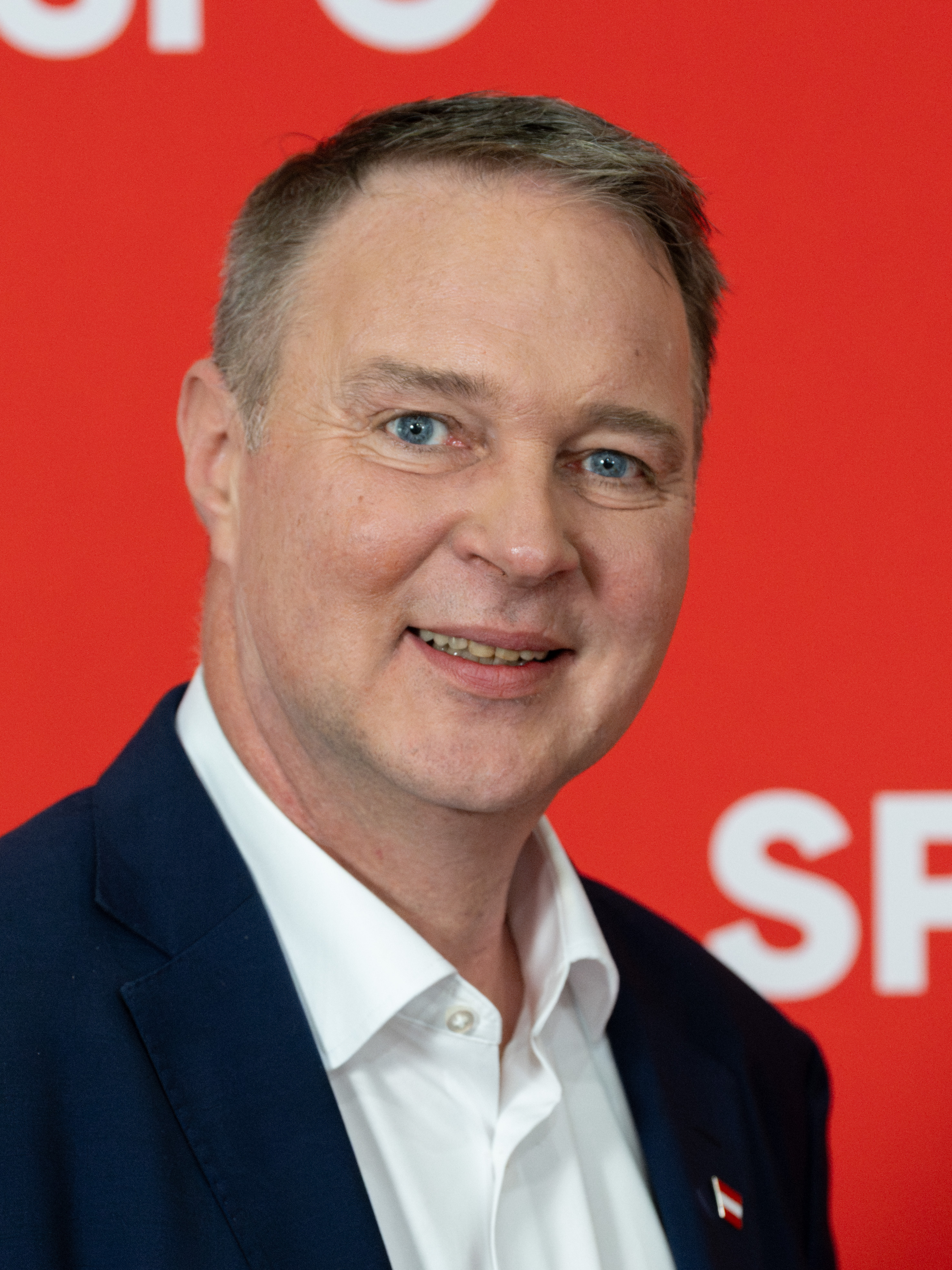

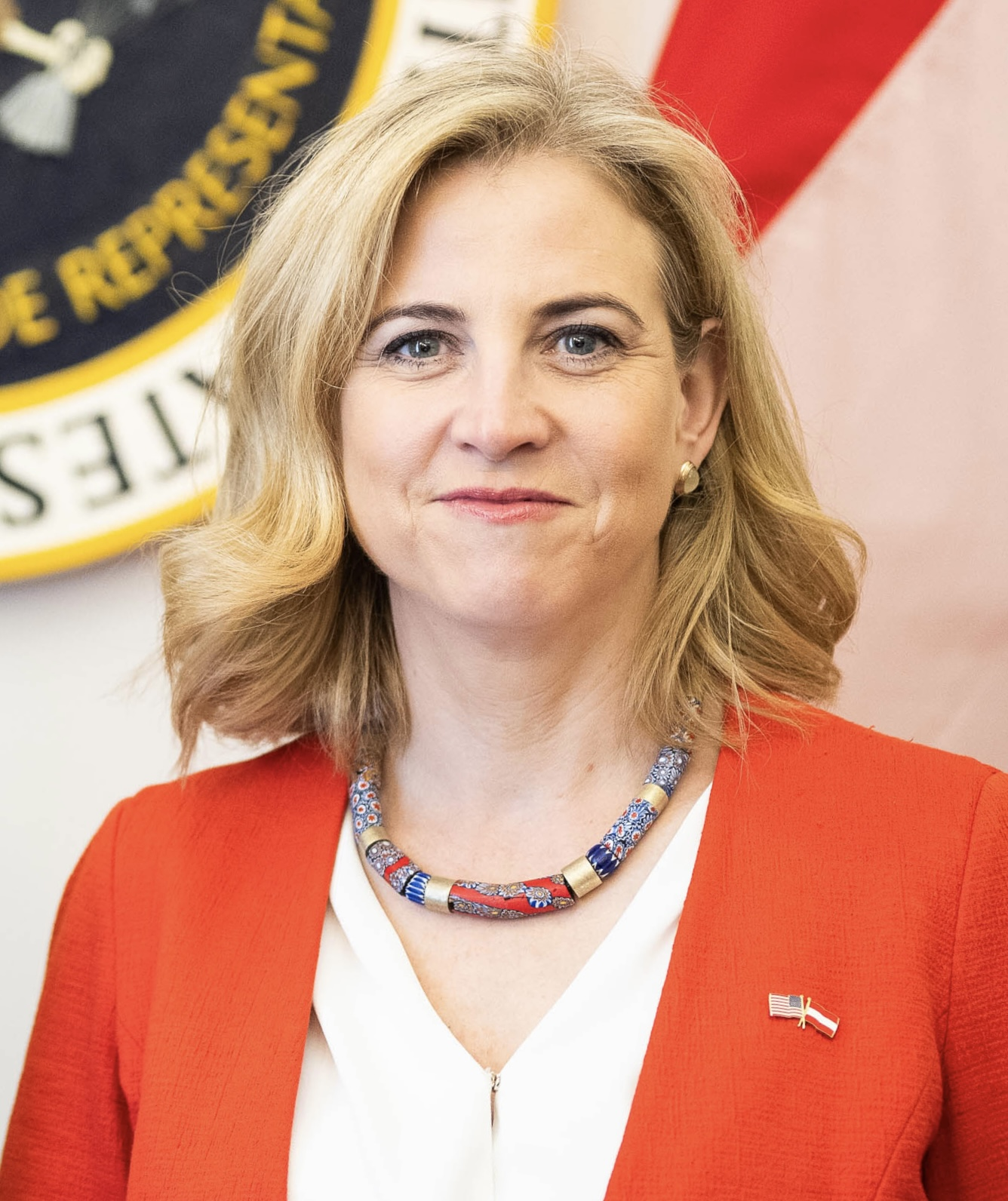

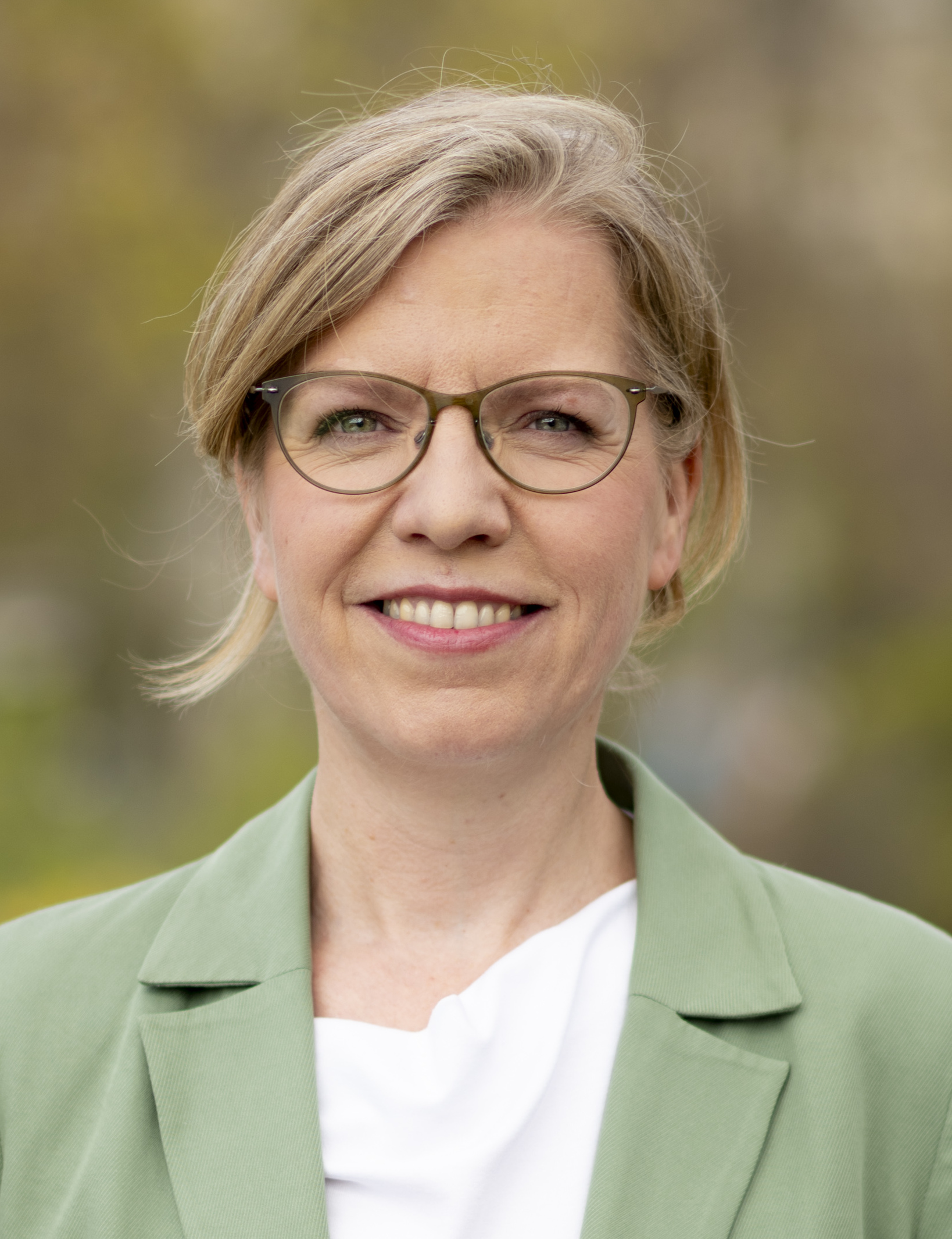
| Leader | Herbert Kickl | Christian Stocker | Andreas Babler |
| Party | FPÖ | ÖVP | SPÖ |
| Last election | 28.8%, 57 seats | 26.3%, 51 seats | 21.1%, 41 seats |
| Leader | Beate Meinl-Reisinger | Leonore Gewessler |
| Party | NEOS | Greens |
| Last election | 9.1%, 18 seats | 8.2%, 16 seats |
Incumbent Government
Stocker government
ÖVP–SPÖ–NEOS

Legislative elections will be held in Austria by 2029 to elect the 29th National Council, the lower house of Austria's bicameral parliament.

== Background ==
The 2024 legislative election resulted in the Freedom Party of Austria (FPÖ) becoming the largest party in parliament for the first time. The Austrian People's Party (ÖVP) finished in second place after suffering significant losses and the Social Democratic Party of Austria (SPÖ) dropped to third place for the first time in the party's history even though its vote share was almost identical to the 2019 election. NEOS also obtained its best-ever result while the Greens remained in parliament albeit with a reduced seat share. No other party was able to clear the 4% threshold to win seats. It led to a ÖVP-SPÖ-NEOS coalition government with Christian Stocker (ÖVP) as Chancellor.

== Electoral system ==
The 183 members of the National Council are elected by open list proportional representation at three levels; a single national constituency, nine constituencies based on the federal states, and 39 regional constituencies. Seats are apportioned to the regional constituencies based on the results of the most recent census. For parties to receive any representation in the National Council, they must either win at least one seat in a constituency directly, or clear a 4 percent national electoral threshold.

Following the elections, seats are allocated to the candidates of successful parties and lists in a three-stage process, starting with the regional constituencies. Seats are distributed according to the Hare quota in the regional constituencies, and with unallocated seats distributed at the state constituency level. Any remaining seats are then allocated using the D'Hondt method at the federal level, to ensure overall proportionality between a party's national vote share and its share of parliamentary seats.

In addition to voting for a political party, voters may cast three preferential votes for specific candidates of that party, but are not required to do so. These additional votes do not affect the proportional allocation based on the vote for the party or list, but can change the rank order of candidates on a party's lists at the federal, state, and regional level. The threshold to increase the position of a candidate on a federal party list is 7 percent, compared to 10 percent at the state level, and 14 percent at the regional level. The names of candidates on regional party lists are printed on the ballot and can be marked with an "x" to indicate the voter's preference. Preference votes for candidates on party lists at the state and federal level, however, must be written in by the voter, either by writing the name or the rank number of the candidate in a blank spot provided for that purpose.

== Opinion polls ==
Local regression of the voter intention polling for the next Austrian legislative election.

=== Nationwide ===
==== 2026 ====
| Polling firm | Fieldwork date | Sample size | Method | FPÖ | ÖVP | SPÖ | NEOS | Grüne | KPÖ | Others | Lead |
|---|---|---|---|---|---|---|---|---|---|---|---|
| Market-Lazarsfeld | 2–10 Nov 2026 | 2,000 | Online | 40 | 20 | 14 | 6 | 13 | 4 | 3 | 20 |
| Market-Lazarsfeld | 23 Oct–3 Nov 2026 | 2,000 | Online | 39 | 21 | 14 | 6 | 12 | 4 | 4 | 18 |
| Market-Lazarsfeld | 19–26 Oct 2026 | 2,000 | Online | 37 | 21 | 15 | 6 | 12 | 4 | 5 | 16 |
| Market-Lazarsfeld | 12–20 Oct 2026 | 2,000 | Online | 38 | 20 | 14 | 6 | 13 | 4 | 5 | 18 |
| Market-Lazarsfeld | 5–13 Oct 2026 | 2,000 | Online | 40 | 19 | 14 | 6 | 12 | 4 | 5 | 21 |
| IFDD | 7–10 Oct 2026 | 1,000 | Online | 40 | 19 | 13 | 7 | 14 | 5 | 2 | 21 |
| OGM | 5–7 Oct 2026 | 1,003 | Online | 39 | 21 | 12 | 7 | 15 | 4 | 2 | 18 |
| Market-Lazarsfeld | 5–6 Oct 2026 | 1,000 | Online | 41 | 20 | 14 | 6 | 12 | 4 | 3 | 21 |
| | 4 Oct | Andreas Babler announces he will step down as SPÖ leader and vice-chancellor in early 2027. | | | | | | | | | |
| Market | 29 Sep–1 Oct 2026 | 816 | Online + CAPI | 38 | 20 | 16 | 8 | 12 | 4 | 2 | 18 |
| OGM | Late-Sep 2026 | ? | Online | 37 | 21 | 15 | 7 | 14 | 4 | 2 | 16 |
| Market-Lazarsfeld | 14–22 Sep 2026 | 2,000 | Online | 38 | 21 | 15 | 6 | 13 | 4 | 3 | 17 |
| Market-Lazarsfeld | 7–15 Sep 2026 | 2,000 | Online | 37 | 22 | 16 | 6 | 13 | 4 | 2 | 15 |
| OGM | 8–10 Sep 2026 | 1,012 | Online | 38 | 21 | 15 | 7 | 13 | 4 | 2 | 17 |
| Market-Lazarsfeld | 31 Aug–8 Sep 2026 | 2,000 | Online | 39 | 21 | 14 | 7 | 13 | 4 | 2 | 18 |
| Market-Lazarsfeld | 24 Aug–1 Sep 2026 | 2,000 | Online | 39 | 21 | 15 | 7 | 12 | 4 | 2 | 18 |
| Market-Lazarsfeld | 17–25 Aug 2026 | 2,000 | Online | 38 | 22 | 15 | 7 | 11 | 3 | 4 | 16 |
| IFDD | 15–17 Jul 2026 | 1,000 | Online | 37 | 20 | 15 | 7 | 13 | 5 | 3 | 17 |
| INSA | 13–15 Jul 2026 | 1,000 | Online | 39 | 19 | 18 | 7 | 8 | 4 | 5 | 20 |
| Market-Lazarsfeld | 29 Jun–7 Jul 2026 | 2,000 | Online | 37 | 19 | 16 | 8 | 12 | 4 | 4 | 18 |
| Unique Research | 15–18 Jun 2026 | 819 | Online + Phone | 36 | 22 | 18 | 9 | 11 | 4 | 0 | 14 |
| Market-Lazarsfeld | 15–16 Jun 2026 | 2,000 | Online | 38 | 20 | 18 | 7 | 12 | 3 | 2 | 18 |
| Market-Lazarsfeld | 1–9 Jun 2026 | 2,000 | Online | 38 | 18 | 18 | 8 | 12 | 3 | 3 | 20 |
| Market-Lazarsfeld | 22 May–2 Jun 2026 | 2,000 | Online | 37 | 20 | 17 | 8 | 12 | 2 | 4 | 17 |
| Market-Lazarsfeld | 22–26 May 2026 | 2,000 | Online | 38 | 21 | 18 | 8 | 10 | 3 | 2 | 17 |
| OGM | 27 Apr–20 May 2026 | 3,017 | Online | 37 | 20 | 16 | 8 | 13 | 4 | 2 | 17 |
| Market-Lazarsfeld | 18–19 May 2026 | 2,000 | Online | 37 | 21 | 18 | 8 | 11 | 3 | 2 | 16 |
| Market-Lazarsfeld | 11–12 May 2026 | 2,000 | Online | 38 | 20 | 18 | 7 | 11 | 3 | 3 | 18 |
| INSA | 13–16 Apr 2026 | 1,000 | Online | 38 | 19 | 19 | 7 | 10 | 4 | 3 | 19 |
| Market-Lazarsfeld | 13–14 Apr 2026 | 2,000 | Online | 38 | 20 | 18 | 7 | 11 | 3 | 3 | 18 |
| Market-Lazarsfeld | 6–7 Apr 2026 | 2,000 | Online | 37 | 18 | 19 | 7 | 11 | 4 | 4 | 18 |
| Market-Lazarsfeld | 30–31 Mar 2026 | 2,000 | Online | 36 | 18 | 19 | 8 | 11 | 3 | 5 | 17 |
| Unique Research | 19–26 Mar 2026 | 821 | Online + Phone | 35 | 22 | 18 | 9 | 11 | 4 | 1 | 13 |
| Market-Lazarsfeld | 23–24 Mar 2026 | 2,000 | Online | 36 | 21 | 18 | 7 | 11 | 3 | 4 | 15 |
| Market-Lazarsfeld | 16–17 Mar 2026 | 2,000 | Online | 37 | 20 | 18 | 7 | 9 | 4 | 5 | 17 |
| INSA | 23–25 Feb 2026 | 1,000 | Online | 38 | 19 | 19 | 7 | 9 | 3 | 5 | 19 |
| Market-Lazarsfeld | 23–24 Feb 2026 | 2,000 | Online | 36 | 22 | 16 | 9 | 10 | 3 | 4 | 14 |
| OGM | Mid-Feb 2026 | ? | Online | 35 | 21 | 18 | ? | ? | ? | ? | 14 |
| Market-Lazarsfeld | 16–17 Feb 2026 | 2,000 | Online | 37 | 20 | 17 | 8 | 9 | 4 | 5 | 17 |
| IFDD | 11–17 Feb 2026 | 2,600 | Online | 35 | 22 | 18 | 9 | 11 | 4 | 1 | 13 |
| Market-Lazarsfeld | 9–10 Feb 2026 | 2,000 | Online | 36 | 21 | 19 | 7 | 9 | 5 | 3 | 15 |
| Market-Lazarsfeld | 2–3 Feb 2026 | 2,000 | Online | 35 | 24 | 18 | 8 | 9 | 3 | 3 | 11 |
| INSA | 12–14 Jan 2026 | 1,000 | Online | 37 | 20 | 20 | 8 | 9 | 3 | 3 | 17 |
| Market-Lazarsfeld | 12–14 Jan 2026 | 2,000 | Online | 35 | 21 | 18 | 9 | 10 | 3 | 4 | 14 |
| Market-Lazarsfeld | 5–7 Jan 2026 | 2,000 | Online | 36 | 19 | 18 | 9 | 11 | 4 | 3 | 17 |
| IFDD | 2–5 Jan 2026 | 1,509 | Online | 36 | 20 | 18 | 9 | 11 | 4 | 2 | 16 |
| 2024 legislative election | 29 Sep 2024 | – | – | 28.8 | 26.3 | 21.1 | 9.1 | 8.2 | 2.4 | 4.0 (Note: BIER: 2.0%) | 2.5 |

==== 2025 ====
| Polling firm | Fieldwork date | Sample size | Method | FPÖ | ÖVP | SPÖ | NEOS | Grüne | KPÖ | Others | Lead |
|---|---|---|---|---|---|---|---|---|---|---|---|
| Market-Lazarsfeld | 8–9 Dec 2025 | 2,000 | Online | 38 | 18 | 18 | 9 | 11 | 3 | 3 | 20 |
| Market-Lazarsfeld | 17–18 Nov 2025 | 2,000 | Online | 38 | 19 | 18 | 9 | 11 | 2 | 3 | 19 |
| Market-Lazarsfeld | 3–4 Nov 2025 | 2,000 | Online | 37 | 20 | 18 | 8 | 10 | 3 | 4 | 17 |
| IFDD | 17–21 Oct 2025 | 1,215 | Online | 36 | 21 | 17 | 9 | 11 | 4 | 2 | 15 |
| Market-Lazarsfeld | 13–14 Oct 2025 | 2,000 | Online | 38 | 21 | 17 | 7 | 11 | 4 | 2 | 17 |
| Market-Lazarsfeld | 6–7 Oct 2025 | 2,000 | Online | 38 | 20 | 17 | 8 | 10 | 4 | 3 | 18 |
| Market-Lazarsfeld | 15–16 Sep 2025 | 2,000 | Online | 36 | 21 | 18 | 8 | 11 | 3 | 3 | 15 |
| IFDD | 10–12 Sep 2025 | 1,500 | Online | 36 | 21 | 18 | 10 | 11 | 3 | 1 | 15 |
| OGM | 9–11 Sep 2025 | 1,027 | Online | 33 | 23 | 19 | 10 | 11 | 3 | 1 | 10 |
| Market-Lazarsfeld | 8–9 Sep 2025 | 2,000 | Online | 36 | 21 | 18 | 8 | 11 | 3 | 3 | 15 |
| OGM | Early Sep 2025 | ? | Online | 33 | 22 | 19 | 10 | 11 | – | 5 | 11 |
| Market-Lazarsfeld | 1–2 Sep 2025 | 2,000 | Online | 36 | 21 | 19 | 9 | 10 | 2 | 3 | 15 |
| INSA | 15–27 Aug 2025 | 1,000 | Online | 37 | 19 | 20 | 9 | 9 | 4 | 2 | 17 |
| Market | 24–30 Jul 2025 | 810 | Online + CAPI | 35 | 22 | 20 | 10 | 9 | 3 | 1 | 13 |
| INSA | 14–17 Jul 2025 | 1,000 | Online | 37 | 19 | 20 | 9 | 10 | 4 | 1 | 17 |
| IFDD | 6–7 Jun 2025 | 1,250 | Online | 32 | 24 | 19 | 10 | 11 | 3 | 1 | 8 |
| Unique Research | 2–5 Jun 2025 | 800 | Online + Phone | 31 | 23 | 19 | 13 | 10 | 3 | 1 | 8 |
| Market | 28 May–3 Jun 2025 | 824 | Online + CAPI | 34 | 21 | 20 | 10 | 10 | 3 | 2 | 13 |
| Market-Lazarsfeld | 26–27 May 2025 | 2,000 | Online | 34 | 20 | 21 | 9 | 10 | 3 | 3 | 13 |
| OGM | 23–26 May 2025 | 1,011 | Online | 32 | 22 | 21 | 12 | 9 | – | 4 | 10 |
| INSA | 19–21 May 2025 | 1,000 | Online | 36 | 20 | 20 | 8 | 9 | 4 | 2 | 16 |
| Market-Lazarsfeld | 5–13 May 2025 | 2,000 | Online | 34 | 22 | 21 | 9 | 9 | 3 | 2 | 12 |
| Market-Lazarsfeld | 28 Apr–6 May 2025 | 2,000 | Online | 33 | 21 | 21 | 10 | 9 | 3 | 3 | 12 |
| Market-Lazarsfeld | 18–29 Apr 2025 | 2,000 | Online | 33 | 22 | 21 | 10 | 9 | 2 | 3 | 11 |
| Market-Lazarsfeld | 14–22 Apr 2025 | 2,000 | Online | 34 | 22 | 20 | 10 | 9 | 3 | 2 | 12 |
| INSA | 14–16 Apr 2025 | 1,000 | Online | 34 | 20 | 22 | 9 | 9 | 3 | 3 | 12 |
| Market-Lazarsfeld | 14–15 Apr 2025 | 2,000 | Online | 34 | 21 | 20 | 10 | 9 | 3 | 3 | 13 |
| Market-Lazarsfeld | 7–15 Apr 2025 | 2,000 | Online | 34 | 21 | 20 | 10 | 9 | 3 | 3 | 13 |
| OGM | 4–9 Apr 2025 | 1,042 | Online | 32 | 23 | 21 | 11 | 9 | 2 | 2 | 9 |
| Market-Lazarsfeld | 31 Mar–8 Apr 2025 | 2,000 | Online | 33 | 21 | 21 | 10 | 8 | 3 | 4 | 12 |
| Market-Lazarsfeld | 24 Mar–1 Apr 2025 | 2,000 | Online | 34 | 21 | 20 | 10 | 8 | 3 | 4 | 13 |
| Market-Lazarsfeld | 17–25 Mar 2025 | 2,000 | Online | 34 | 21 | 20 | 11 | 9 | 2 | 3 | 13 |
| Market-Lazarsfeld | 17–18 Mar 2025 | 2,000 | Online | 33 | 22 | 21 | 12 | 8 | 2 | 2 | 11 |
| Market-Lazarsfeld | 3–11 Mar 2025 | 2,000 | Online | 33 | 21 | 21 | 11 | 9 | 3 | 2 | 12 |
| Market | 5–7 Mar 2025 | 829 | Online + CAPI | 32 | 21 | 21 | 12 | 9 | 3 | 2 | 11 |
| Market-Lazarsfeld | 24 Feb–4 Mar 2025 | 2,000 | Online | 34 | 20 | 21 | 11 | 9 | 3 | 2 | 13 |
| INSA | 24–26 Feb 2025 | 1,000 | Online | 34 | 20 | 23 | 9 | 9 | – | 5 | 11 |
| Market-Lazarsfeld | 24–25 Feb 2025 | 2,000 | Online | 35 | 19 | 21 | 11 | 9 | 3 | 2 | 14 |
| OGM | 17–18 Feb 2025 | 941 | Online | 34 | 19 | 21 | 13 | 10 | 2 | 1 | 13 |
| Market-Lazarsfeld | 17–18 Feb 2025 | 2,000 | Online | 34 | 18 | 22 | 11 | 10 | 3 | 2 | 12 |
| IFDD | 13–15 Feb 2025 | 1,250 | Online | 33 | 19 | 22 | 11 | 10 | 3 | 2 | 11 |
| Spectra | 13–14 Feb 2025 | 1,001 | Online | 35 | 19 | 22 | 10 | 9 | 3 | 3 | 13 |
| Market-Lazarsfeld | 10–11 Feb 2025 | 2,000 | Online | 33 | 19 | 23 | 10 | 10 | 3 | 2 | 10 |
| Market-Lazarsfeld | 3–4 Feb 2025 | 2,000 | Online | 34 | 19 | 22 | 9 | 10 | 3 | 3 | 12 |
| Market-Lazarsfeld | 27–28 Jan 2025 | 2,000 | Online | 34 | 19 | 22 | 10 | 9 | 3 | 3 | 12 |
| Market-Lazarsfeld | 13–21 Jan 2025 | 2,000 | Online | 35 | 18 | 21 | 12 | 9 | 3 | 2 | 14 |
| INSA | 13–15 Jan 2025 | 1,000 | Online | 35 | 20 | 20 | 11 | 8 | – | 6 | 15 |
| Market-Lazarsfeld | 13–14 Jan 2025 | 2,000 | Online | 38 | 17 | 19 | 12 | 9 | 3 | 2 | 19 |
| Market-Lazarsfeld | 7–8 Jan 2025 | 1,000 | Online | 39 | 17 | 19 | 10 | 10 | 3 | 2 | 20 |
| IFDD | 3–4 Jan 2025 | 1,250 | Online | 37 | 21 | 19 | 11 | 8 | 3 | 1 | 16 |
| 2024 legislative election | 29 Sep 2024 | – | – | 28.8 | 26.3 | 21.1 | 9.1 | 8.2 | 2.4 | 4.0 | 2.5 |

==== 2024 ====
| Polling firm | Fieldwork date | Sample size | Method | FPÖ | ÖVP | SPÖ | NEOS | Grüne | KPÖ | Others | Lead |
|---|---|---|---|---|---|---|---|---|---|---|---|
| IFDD | 17–18 Dec 2024 | 1,250 | Online | 37 | 21 | 20 | 10 | 8 | 3 | 1 | 16 |
| Market-Lazarsfeld | 16–17 Dec 2024 | 2,000 | Online | 36 | 20 | 19 | 10 | 8 | 3 | 4 | 16 |
| Market | 13–17 Dec 2024 | 809 | Online + CAPI | 35 | 22 | 20 | 10 | 8 | 3 | 2 (Note: BIER: 1.0%) | 13 |
| Market-Lazarsfeld | 9–10 Dec 2024 | 2,000 | Online | 36 | 21 | 19 | 10 | 8 | 3 | 3 | 15 |
| Unique Research | 2–4 Dec 2024 | 800 | Online + Phone | 35 | 20 | 21 | 12 | 8 | 2 | 2 | 14 |
| INSA | 2–4 Dec 2024 | 1,004 | Online | 34 | 21 | 20 | 9 | 8 | 3 | 5 | 13 |
| Market-Lazarsfeld | 2–3 Dec 2024 | 2,000 | Online | 35 | 20 | 19 | 11 | 8 | 4 | 3 | 15 |
| Market-Lazarsfeld | 25–26 Nov 2024 | 2,000 | Online | 33 | 21 | 19 | 11 | 8 | 4 | 4 | 12 |
| OGM | 25–26 Nov 2024 | 1,018 | Online | 32 | 24 | 20 | 12 | 7 | – | 5 | 8 |
| Market-Lazarsfeld | 18–19 Nov 2024 | 2,000 | Online | 32 | 23 | 20 | 10 | 8 | 3 | 4 | 9 |
| INSA | 11–13 Nov 2024 | 1,000 | Online | 32 | 22 | 21 | 9 | 8 | 2 | 6 | 10 |
| Market-Lazarsfeld | 11–12 Nov 2024 | 2,000 | Online | 33 | 23 | 21 | 9 | 8 | 3 | 3 | 10 |
| Market-Lazarsfeld | 4–5 Nov 2024 | 2,000 | Online | 34 | 23 | 21 | 9 | 8 | 3 | 2 | 11 |
| Market-Lazarsfeld | 28–29 Oct 2024 | 2,000 | Online | 33 | 23 | 21 | 10 | 8 | 3 | 2 | 10 |
| OGM | 25–28 Oct 2024 | 1,008 | Online | 32 | 25 | 20 | 10 | 8 | 2 | 3 | 7 |
| Market-Lazarsfeld | 21–22 Oct 2024 | 2,000 | Online | 33 | 23 | 19 | 11 | 8 | 4 | 2 | 10 |
| Market-Lazarsfeld | 14–15 Oct 2024 | 2,000 | Online | 32 | 25 | 19 | 10 | 8 | 3 | 3 | 7 |
| Market-Lazarsfeld | 7–8 Oct 2024 | 2,000 | Online | 33 | 26 | 19 | 10 | 7 | 2 | 3 | 7 |
| Market-Lazarsfeld | 30 Sep – 1 Oct 2024 | 2,000 | Online | 30 | 25 | 20 | 11 | 8 | 2 | 4 | 5 |
| 2024 legislative election | 29 Sep 2024 | – | – | 28.8 | 26.3 | 21.1 | 9.1 | 8.2 | 2.4 | 4.0 | 2.5 |

=== By state ===
==== Vienna ====
| Polling firm | Fieldwork date | Sample size | Method | SPÖ | FPÖ | ÖVP | Grüne | NEOS | KPÖ | Others | Lead |
|---|---|---|---|---|---|---|---|---|---|---|---|
| IFDD | 21–24 Apr 2026 | 1,017 | Online | 26 | 27 | 13 | 17 | 12 | 4 | 1 | 1 |
| 2024 legislative election in Vienna | 29 Sep 2024 | – | – | 29.9 | 20.7 | 17.4 | 12.3 | 11.4 | 3.8 | 4.5 (Note: BIER: 2.1%) | 9.2 |

For the first time ever in the history of Austrian legislative elections, the SPÖ only ranked second in Vienna according to the April 2026 poll by IFDD for the Kronen Zeitung.
