= 2023 Social Democratic Party of Austria leadership election =

- 24 April – 3 June 2023
- Turnout: First round: 107,133 (72.39%); Second round: 602 (98.85%)
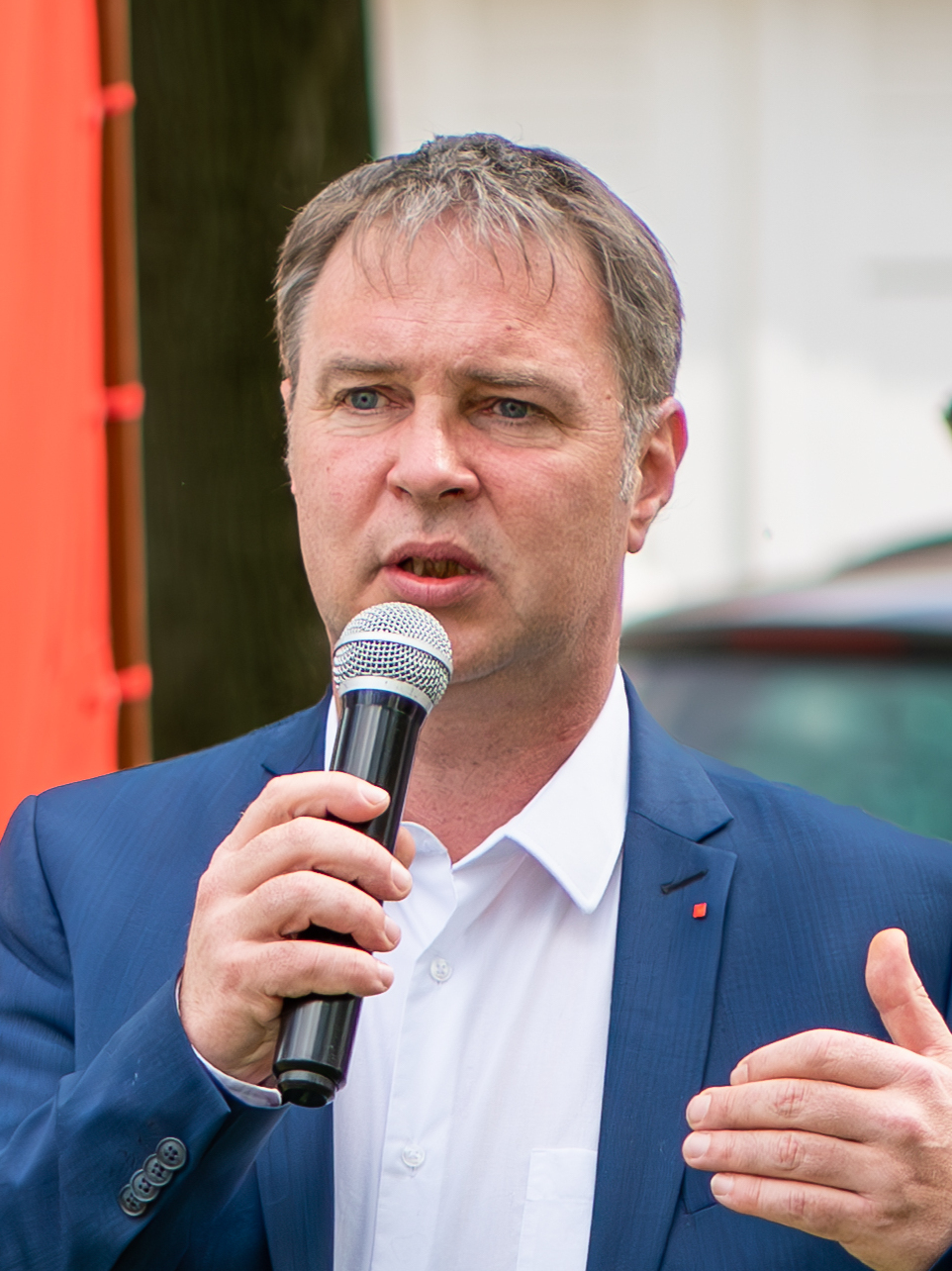

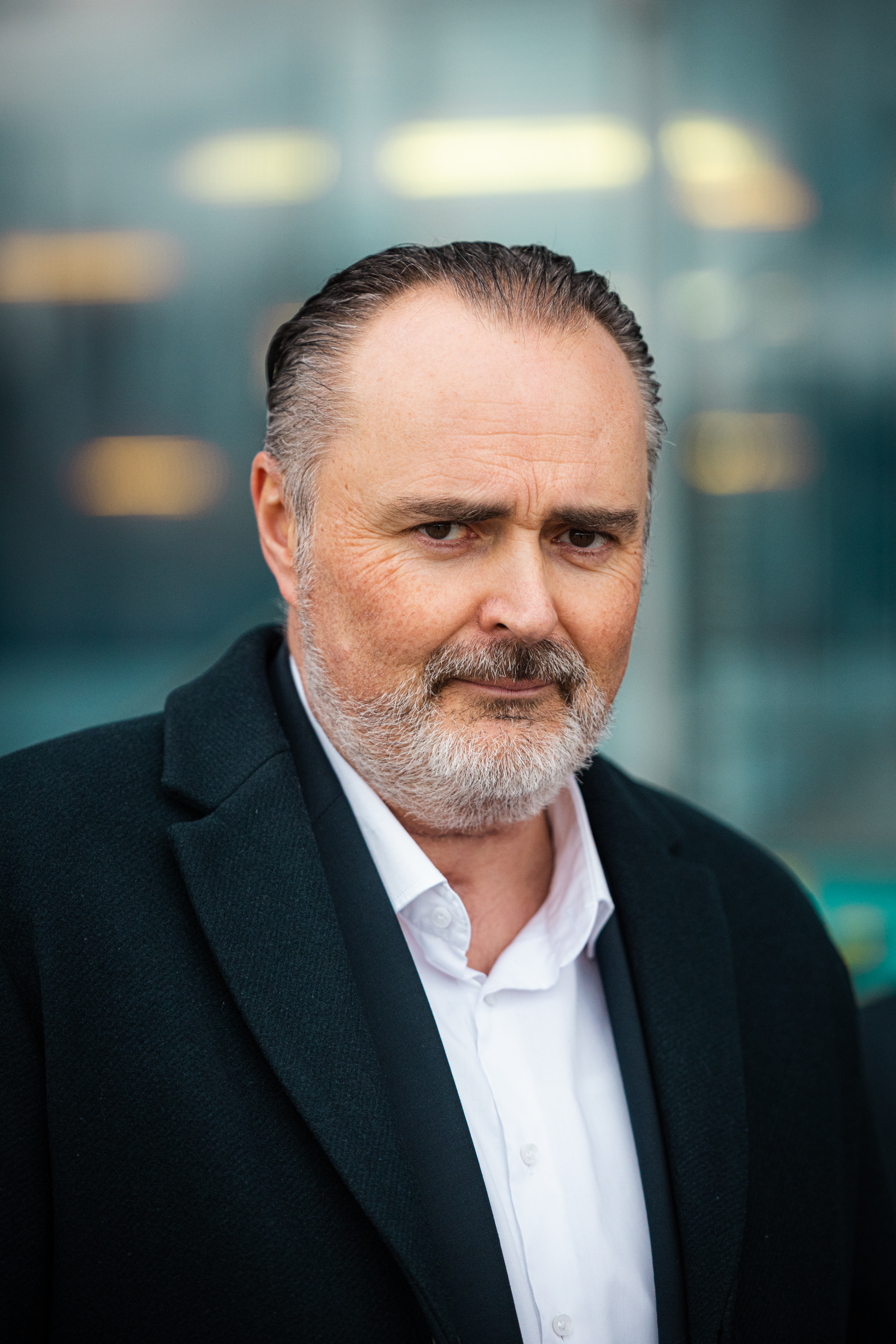

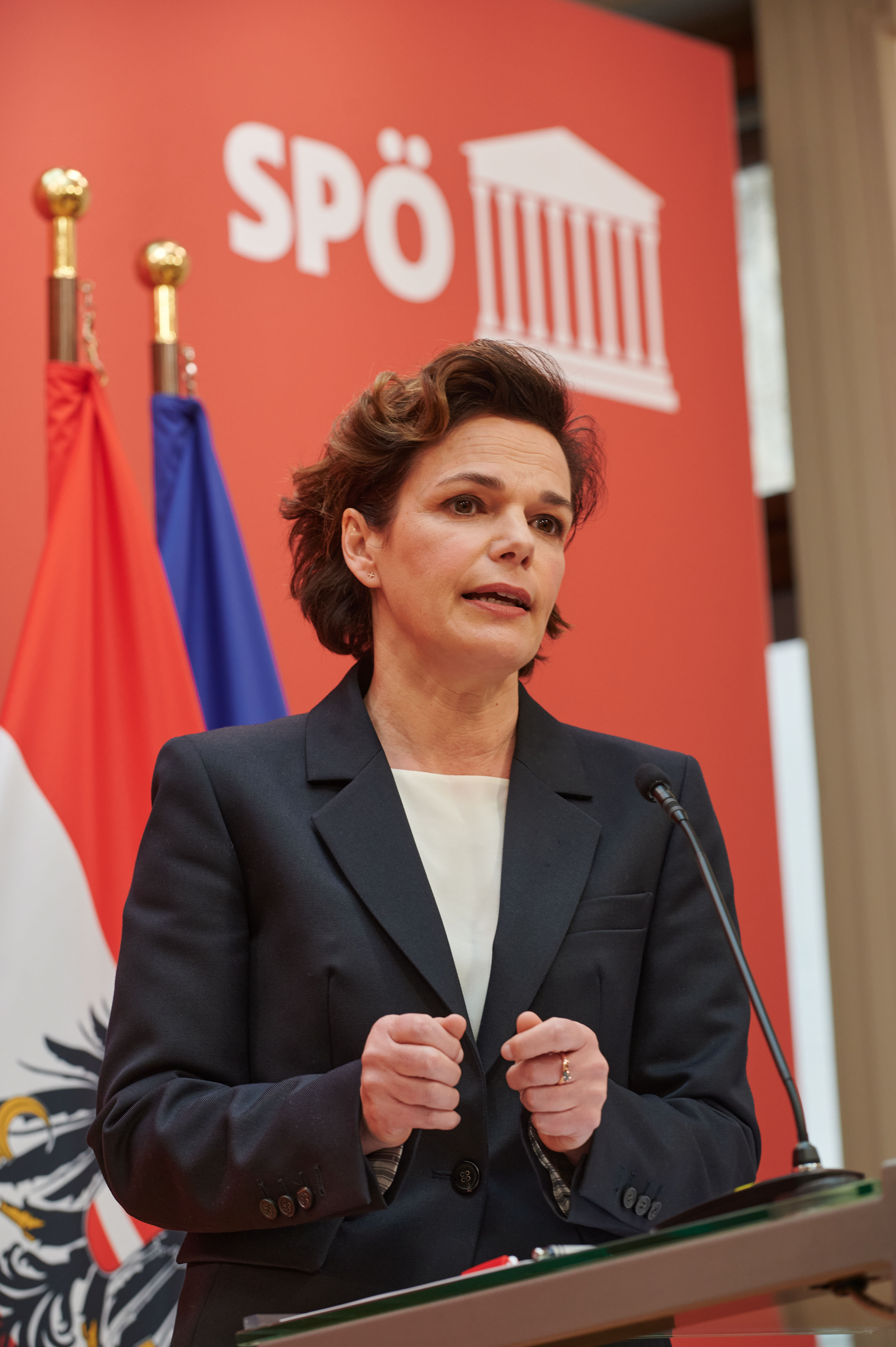
Candidate	Andreas Babler	Hans Peter Doskozil	Pamela Rendi-Wagner
Member's vote	33,703 (31.5%)	36,019 (33.7%)	33,528 (31.4%)
Party congress vote	317 (53.1%)	280 (46.9%)	Withdrew

The 2023 Social Democratic Party of Austria (SPÖ) leadership election developed when Pamela Rendi-Wagner, the incumbent SPÖ chairwoman since 2018, was openly challenged by her main critic Hans Peter Doskozil, the Landeshauptmann of Burgenland. To decide the power struggle, the SPÖ decided on an advisory survey among all party members. Initially the survey was planned to be a duel with both participants agreeing to withdraw in case they would not win. However, the survey was finally opened to other candidates. Among the many applicants (a major share non-serious), Andreas Babler was the only contestant winning enough support to be included in the survey.

The non-binding vote was conducted by mail and online, between 24 April and 10 May 2023. Results were released on 22 May 2023 with each candidate earning roughly 1/3 of the votes. Doskozil won, Babler came in second, and Rendi-Wagner very narrowly in third place. Rendi-Wagner announced her resignation on 23 May 2023.

Following the vote, an extraordinary party congress was then held in Linz on 3 June 2023, at which delegates elected Babler as the new chairperson with over 53% of the vote after initially declaring incorrectly that Doskozil had won.

== Overview ==
SPÖ party logo

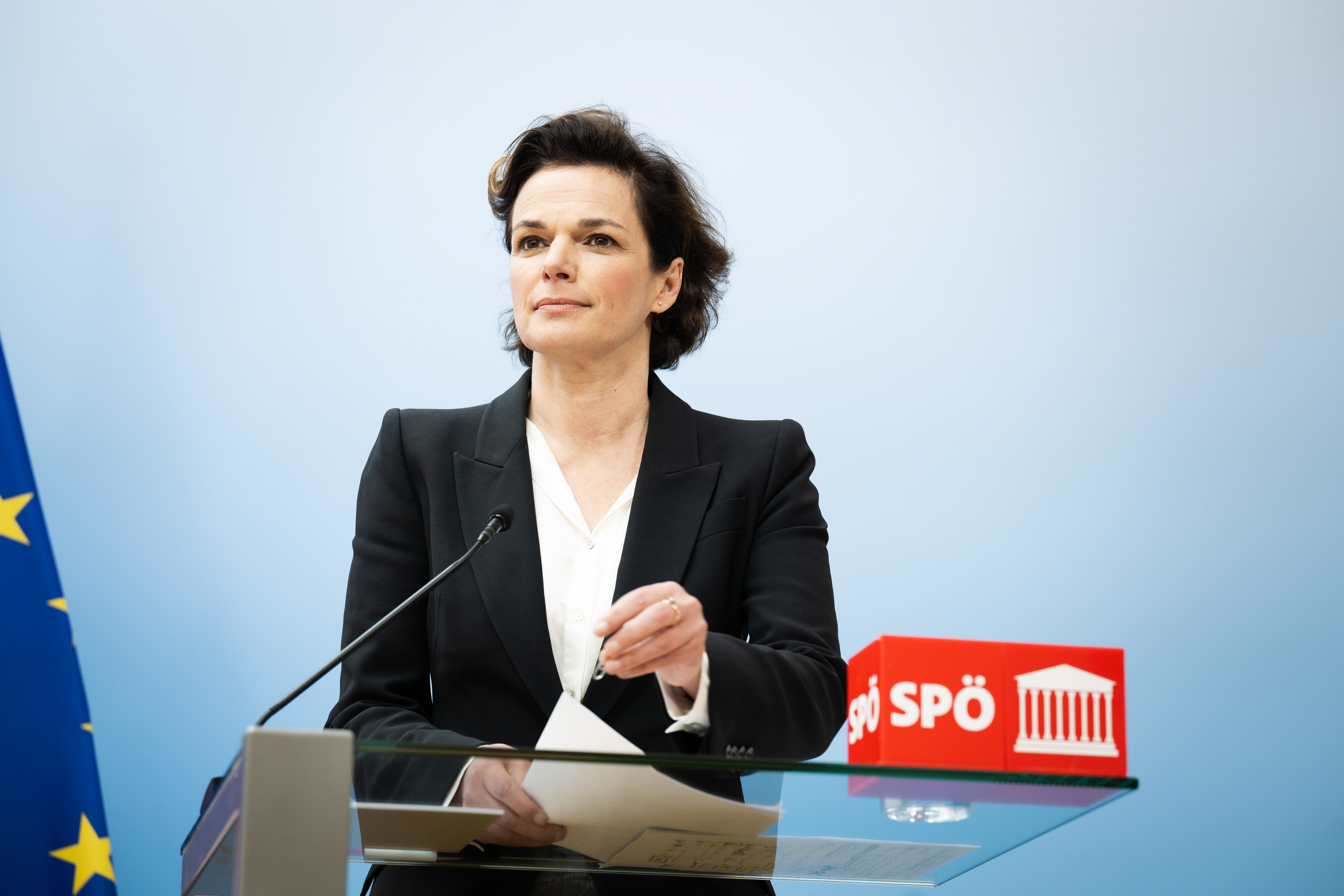
Pamela Rendi-Wagner, former SPÖ-chairwoman from 2018 to 2023

The leadership election became necessary after Hans Peter Doskozil, a migration hardliner from Eastern Austria, applied for the party chair after years of publicly cross-firing against then party leader Pamela Rendi-Wagner, the first woman to lead the Social Democratic Party of Austria (SPÖ) on a federal level. Until then, a colleague has never challenged an incumbent SPÖ chairperson. For months, the Social Democrats were in second place behind the far-right Freedom Party of Austria (FPÖ) in Austrian polls, although they were almost consistently in the lead in 2022, sometimes even topping 30%. By the end of March 2023, some polls showed that the SPÖ fell into third place, which has been attributed to the infighting in the preceding months.

The party member vote started the day after the 2023 Salzburg state election, in which the SPÖ received its worst election result ever. The SPÖ previously lost a significant share of votes in the 2023 Lower Austrian state election in January and in the 2023 Carinthian state election in March. With the leadership election, the party therefore hopes for a turnaround ahead of the next Austrian legislative election, to be held by Autumn 2024. According to SPÖ party statutes, the vote results by party members will be non-binding to the delegates at the extraordinary party congress on 3 June. Rendi-Wagner and Doskozil have pledged to accept the results of the party member vote. Babler has not done so, instead calling for a runoff vote. He also indicated that he might run as a candidate at the extraordinary party congress on 3 June, even if he doesn't get the plurality in the member vote.

== Candidates ==
On 22 March, the SPÖ announced that anyone with an active party membership by Friday, 24 March 2023, can be a candidate in the election. Potential candidates also had until midnight on 24 March to submit their candidacy. As of 23 March, there were at least 7 publicly announced candidates. Following the announcement of Traiskirchen mayor Andreas Babler as a candidate, some candidates have withdrawn or were considering withdrawing their candidacy. Nikolaus Kowall, who, like Babler, represents the left wing of the party, withdrew his candidacy and endorsed Babler instead.

On 25 March, the SPÖ announced that 73 people submitted their candidacy by the end of the deadline, among them 69 men and 4 women. The SPÖ checked the validity of their registrations and debated their ballot access in its final leadership committee meeting on 27 March. On 11 April, the SPÖ announced that only 3 of the 73 submitted candidacies qualified for the ballot.

=== Official candidates on the ballot ===
(ranked by placement on the ballot)

1. Pamela Rendi-Wagner, current party leader
2. Hans Peter Doskozil, current governor of Burgenland
3. Andreas Babler, current mayor of Traiskirchen

There was also a 4th option on the ballot: "None of the above-mentioned candidates."

=== Other candidates ===
Nikolaus Kowall, vice party leader of the SPÖ-Alsergrund, was the first person to announce his bid for the party leadership apart from Rendi-Wagner and Doskozil. Therefore, the SPÖ opened the survey for other candidates. When two days later Babler announced to enter the race, Kowall withdrew and endorsed Babler.

Using the ballot for his own publicity, right-wing populist Gerald Grosz announced to have applied for SPÖ membership and leadership, but both attempts were immediately disqualified by the SPÖ.

== Conduct ==
=== Rules of the election ===
Primary organizational questions about how the leadership election should be conducted were debated and announced in late March 2023 by the SPÖ's top party committees. On 22 March 2023, the SPÖ announced the date of the membership vote (from 24 April to 10 May). It further confirmed that the vote will be held by mail and online, overseen by an official independent notary and independent IT experts. Following the party member vote, a subsequent extraordinary party congress will be held on 3 June to elect the new chairperson. Initially, about 140,000 party members were eligible to vote. The deadline to register as a new party member of the SPÖ and receive a vote was Friday, 24 March 2023. The same deadline applied to party members seeking a candidacy. On 25 March 2023, the SPÖ announced that it received about 9.000 new applications for party membership before the deadline, that the applications will be reviewed and checked for validity in the coming days and that the final number of eligible voters will be released. On Monday, 27 March 2023, the conduct of the leadership election and remaining questions was finalized and approved by the SPÖ's top party committee. Final unresolved questions include the number of candidates and if all serious candidacies submitted by the deadline should be allowed onto the ballot. With 73 people registering their candidacy before the deadline, some committee members are calling for additional hurdles for ballot access, such as collecting a certain number of signatures from party members. Another question to be resolved is the possibility (or necessity) of a runoff election, in case no candidate should reach a majority of votes.

The SPÖ announced that by Friday, 31 March 2023, that all 73 potential candidates must submit the following to the party:

1. at least 30 signatures from fellow party members
2. an official government document declaring they have no criminal record
3. declare that they are not a member of another party
4. that they are eligible to be a candidate for the 2024 Austrian legislative election
5. a formal application document with name, address, citizenship, picture, contact information, a personal curriculum vitae and preferably a short introduction or motivational video to be posted on the SPÖ candidate website as information for voters in the leadership election

The SPÖ decided to introduce these criteria to avoid fake or joke candidacies among the 73 submitted candidate applications and to narrow down the ballot to include serious candidates only. There was at least one application in which a giraffe wanted to become the next SPÖ leader. There would be no runoff if no candidate receives a majority of the votes.

=== Election confirmation ===
On 11 April 2023, the SPÖ announced that only Rendi-Wagner, Doskozil, and Babler met the criteria above and could appear on the ballot, while the remaining 70 submitted candidacies were either invalid, incomplete or withdrawn. The party further announced that the result of the membership vote by mail and online will be released no sooner than 22 May 2023. This is because mail ballots from party members can be received up until 17 May 2023, with a post stamp no later than 10 May 2023. Mail votes would trump online votes in case a party member accidentally or intentionally voted twice. The vote-counting process would be administered and cross-checked by the SPÖ's internal voting commission, independent notaries, and IT experts.

== Opinion polls ==
=== First round ===
Only SPÖ party members were able to take part in the vote. Polls only measured the views of the general population and SPÖ voters.

Fieldwork date	Pollster	Sample size	Rendi-Wagner	Doskozil	Babler	Others/ None	Undecided/ Don't know
8–10 May 2023	Market-Lazarsfeld	SPÖ voters	43%	16%	28%	12%	—
24–26 April 2023	Market-Lazarsfeld	1,000 voters	16%	25%	17%	41%	—
24–26 April 2023	Market-Lazarsfeld	SPÖ voters	31%	33%	29%	8%	—
11–13 April 2023	Unique Research	800 voters	20%	29%	15%	27%	9%
11–13 April 2023	Unique Research	SPÖ voters	49%	20%	18%	11%	3%
27–29 March 2023	Market-Lazarsfeld	1,000 voters	16%	21%	12%	15%	36%
27–29 March 2023	Market-Lazarsfeld	SPÖ voters	37%	18%	17%	9%	18%
20–23 March 2023	Unique Research	800 voters	26%	39%	—	26%	9%
20–23 March 2023	Unique Research	SPÖ voters	63%	22%	—	9%	5%
20–22 March 2023	Market-Lazarsfeld	1,000 voters	24%	37%	—	—	40%
20–22 March 2023	Market-Lazarsfeld	SPÖ voters	49%	37%	—	—	14%

=== Second round ===
Only SPÖ party delegates will be able to take part in the vote. Polls only measured the views of SPÖ voters.

Fieldwork date	Pollster	Sample size	Doskozil	Babler
23–25 May 2023	Market-Lazarsfeld	213 SPÖ voters	49%	51%

=== General election ===
Polling firm	Fieldwork date	Sample size	Method	ÖVP	Babler	Doskozil	Rendi-Wagner	FPÖ	Grüne	NEOS	KPÖ	Others	Lead
Market-Lazarsfeld	26–31 May 2023	511	Online	26	19	—N/a	—N/a	31	7	9	3	3	5
Market-Lazarsfeld	26–31 May 2023	489	Online	22	—N/a	20	—N/a	27	10	14	6	1	5
IFDD	25–27 May 2023	1,208	Online	24	26	—N/a	—N/a	27	8	8	4	3	1
IFDD	25–27 May 2023	1,208	Online	22	—N/a	25	—N/a	26	10	9	6	2	1
OGM	22–24 May 2023	1,186	Online	23	26	—N/a	—N/a	28	8	9	4	2	2
OGM	22–24 May 2023	1,186	Online	20	—N/a	24	—N/a	26	10	10	8	2	2
Market-Lazarsfeld	27–29 Mar 2023	1,000	Online	22	16	—N/a	—N/a	31	11	13	7		9
Market-Lazarsfeld	27–29 Mar 2023	1,000	Online	20	—N/a	25	—N/a	28	10	12	5		3
Market-Lazarsfeld	27–29 Mar 2023	1,000	Online	21	—N/a	—N/a	21	29	10	13	6		3
Unique Research	20–23 Mar 2023	800	Phone & Online	21	—N/a	31	—N/a	25	11	10	3		6
Unique Research	20–23 Mar 2023	800	Phone & Online	25	—N/a	—N/a	24	28	11	9	3		3
Peter Hajek	7–10 Nov 2022	800	Phone & Online	20	—N/a	32	—N/a	21	10	12	5		11
Peter Hajek	7–10 Nov 2022	800	Phone & Online	22	—N/a	—N/a	27	25	10	10	6 (incl. MFG 3%)		2

== Results ==
=== Results of the non-binding party member survey ===
Results were released on 22 May 2023 with Hans Peter Doskozil winning, Andreas Babler coming in second and Pamela Rendi-Wagner in third place.

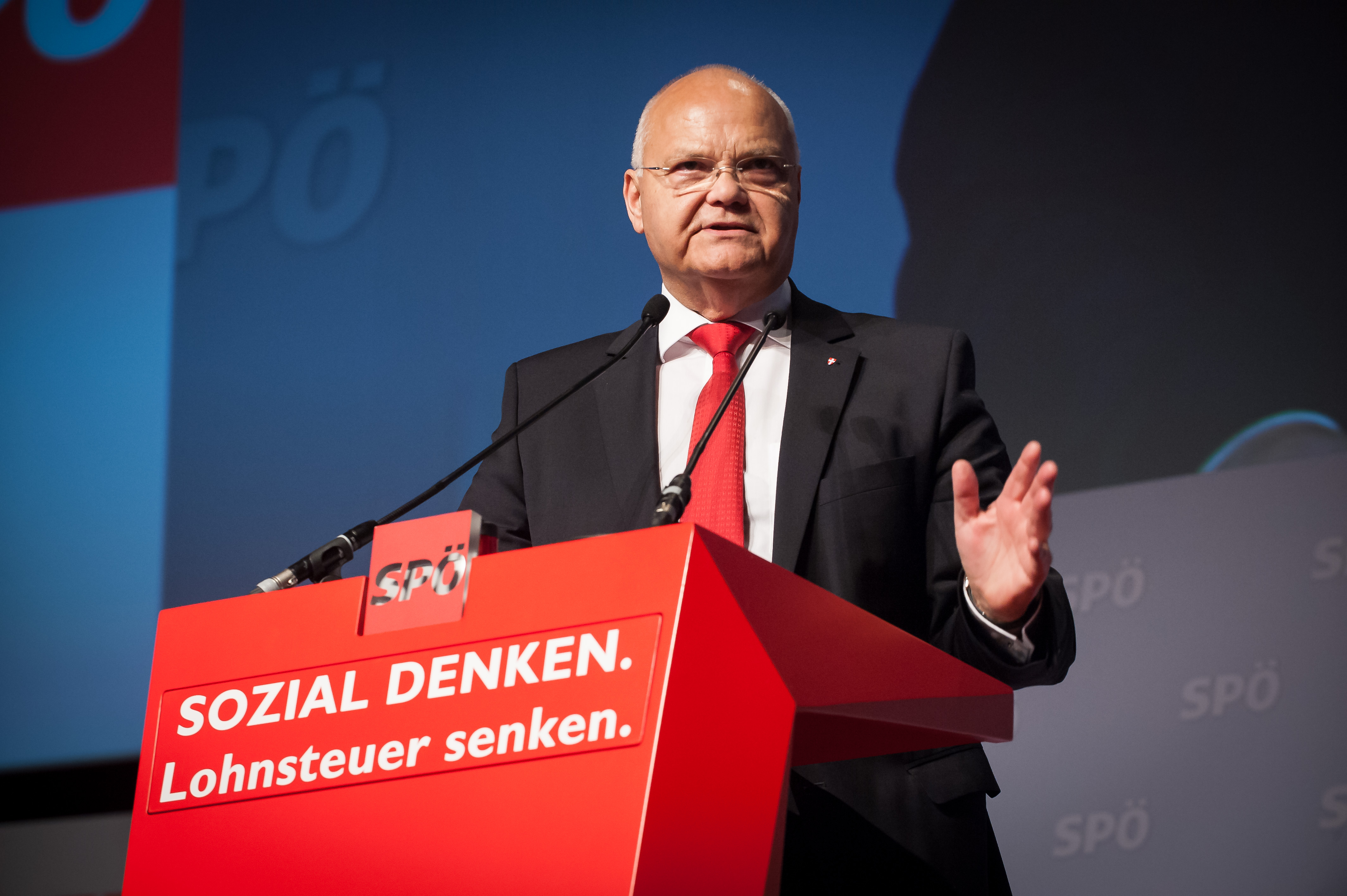
Harry Kopietz

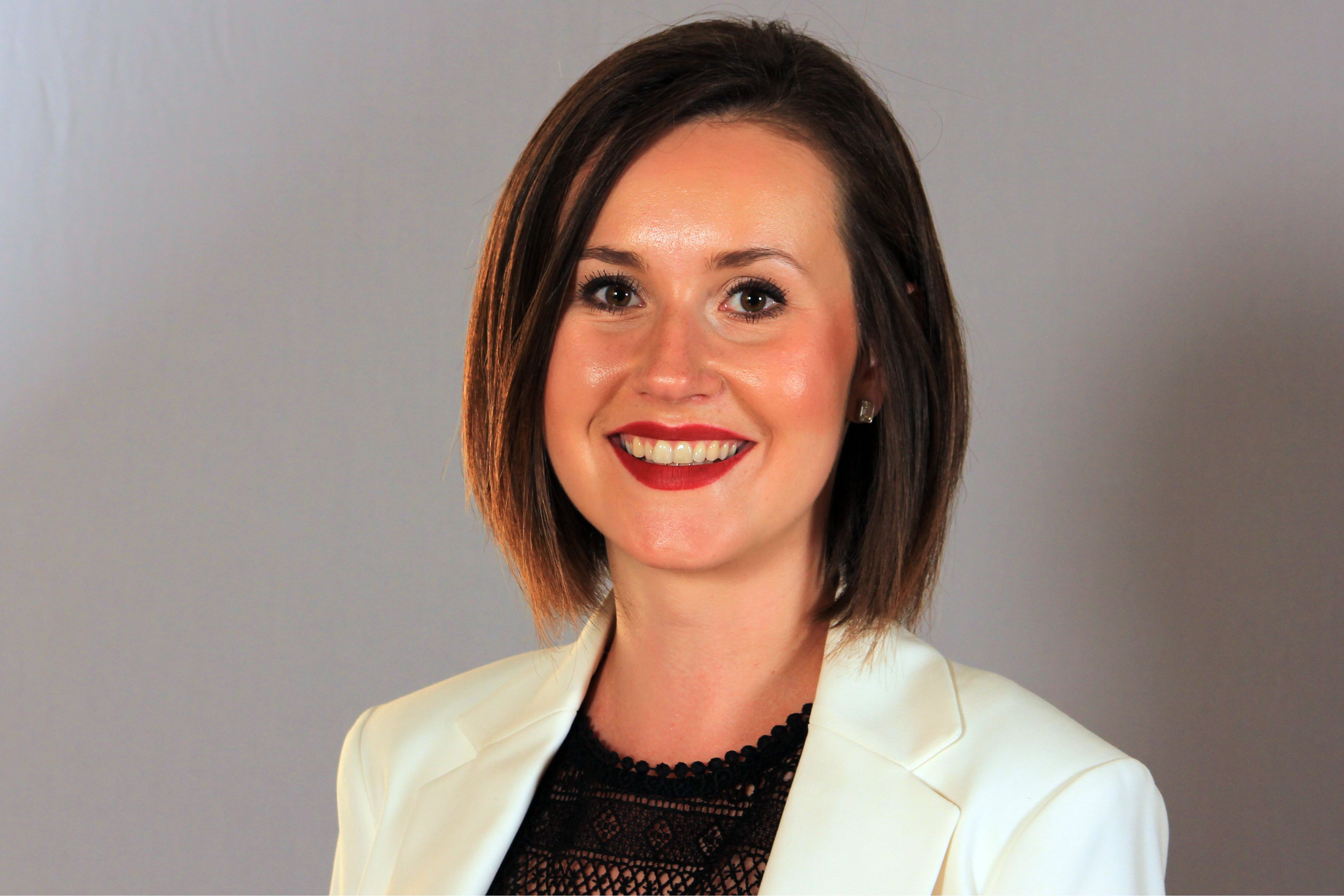
Michaela Grubesa

On 11 May 2023, before the results were announced, the leader of the 20-member SPÖ election commission, Harry Kopietz, who was a Rendi-Wagner supporter, resigned because of health reasons. He was replaced by Michaela Grubesa, a Doskozil supporter, with the overall size of the election commission shrinking to 19. Members who resign cannot be replaced during the term as they are elected at the party convention.

Grubesa announced that "she wants to make the vote counting process as transparent as possible" and invited representatives of all 3 candidates to oversee the vote count, as well as notaries and external IT experts.

Candidate	Votes	%
Hans Peter Doskozil	36,019	33.68
Andreas Babler	33,703	31.51
Pamela Rendi-Wagner	33,528	31.35
None of the above	3,702	3.46
Total	106,952	100.00
Valid votes	106,952	99.83
Invalid/blank votes	181	0.17
Total votes	107,133	100.00
Registered voters/turnout	147,993	72.39
Source: SPÖ;

=== Results of the extraordinary party congress ===
==== Final result ====
Candidate	Votes	%
Andreas Babler	317	53.10
Hans Peter Doskozil	280	46.90
Total	597	100.00
Valid votes	597	99.17
Invalid/blank votes	5	0.83
Total votes	602	100.00
Registered voters/turnout	609	98.85
Source: SPÖ Livestream

Initially, 609 delegates were invited to elect the new party chairman. Outgoing party chairwoman Pamela Rendi-Wagner announced that she would not attend the extraordinary party congress because she wanted to leave the stage completely open to the two contenders and eventually the new party chairman. At the start of the extraordinary party congress, it was announced that 603 of the 609 invited delegates were present. Of the 603 delegates present, 602 cast a ballot.

==== Result mix-up ====
Originally, the SPÖ announced Doskozil had won the election with 316 delegate votes to 279 for Babler. Doskozil was then announced leader and acted as such for two days. On 5 June, it was discovered that there was an error when merging data in the results spreadsheets used to gather the votes that meant votes for Babler were counted for Doskozil, and vice versa. The party's electoral commission head, Michaela Grubesa, announced that Andreas Babler had won the election by a margin of 317 votes to 280 after an Excel spreadsheet used to count the votes had flipped the vote count. In the recount, the party also noticed a vote that was missing from the original total vote count. Another vote that was previously tabled as a valid vote, but was not assigned to a candidate, was assigned correctly in the recount. Therefore, both candidates gained one additional vote each, compared to the original Saturday results that were mixed up. According to the election commission, the Excel spreadsheet mix-up resulted from an outdated, non-suitable, pre-formatted and blank Excel table, which was used to table their results at previous party congresses, in which usually just one candidate (the incumbent) was running and no-votes are then subtracted from that candidate in the other column. The election commission ruled out any wrongdoing and especially intentional malice by election commission members present on Saturday during and after the count because all protocols from the 12 ballot booths were correctly signed by the commission members. All 602 delegates who cast ballots also had their QR-codes on their ballots registered in the protocols at the time of their voting. This means the results have always been there and recorded the correct way for Babler on Saturday but that the results from each of the 12 polling booths were incorrectly entered into the wrong column. The two additional votes that were tabled in the recount were due to "communication errors".

== Aftermath ==
=== Aftermath of the non-binding party member survey ===
On 23 May 2023, incumbent party leader Pamela Rendi-Wagner announced that she would not be a candidate at the extraordinary party congress on 3 June 2023 and subsequently announced her orderly resignation as party leader and parliamentary group leader. She remained in office until a new party leader and parliamentary group leader was elected. On 23 May 2023, after seven hours of heated debate, the SPÖ's top leadership committee voted down an additional runoff motion due to the close results between the candidates. The runoff motion was favoured by Babler and his supporters, as well as the Vienna-SPÖ but was rejected by a vote of 25 to 22. Instead, the extraordinary party congress would be a run-off between Doskozil and Babler. 609 delegates will be able to cast secret ballots between Doskozil and Babler, to settle the leadership question.

In the week following the results of the party member survey, Andreas Babler attracted attention for his remarks and how left-wing he was, for example referring to himself as a Marxist. Expressing his surprise at the uproar, he explained that his political programme was "deeply social democratic" and that he was referring to the Marxist influence on social democracy rather than expropriation and the dictatorship of the proletariat, which he opposed. Later, a podcast from 2020 was made public, in which Babler strongly criticized the European Union (EU) as a "neoliberal construct with just a weak social safety net and in its behaviour more aggressive and militaristic than NATO". Babler was also strongly against Austrian EU membership decades ago during his time as a Young Socialist. In response, Babler made clear that he does not support Austria leaving the EU, and that he supports turning the EU into a welfare union. Nonetheless, political experts saw his chances to be elected the new Austrian SPÖ party chairman declining after these remarks.

On 3 June 2023, at the start of the extraordinary party congress, election commission chairwoman Michaela Grubesa said that Berthold Felber, a party member from Burgenland, announced his intention to run as a third candidate at the congress and according to party statutes was able to be written in at the election. For his votes to be counted as valid, delegates had to write his name on the ballot and cross out the names of the main two candidates. Before the start of the party congress, Babler shook hands and welcomed all delegates personally, after which both candidates delivered 45-minute speeches to the delegates and guests. The speeches were followed by about 2 hours of debate by delegates, after which the leadership vote took place.

=== Aftermath of the extraordinary party congress ===
==== Prior to the result mix-up ====
After being proclaimed the new SPÖ-chairman, Doskozil thanked his competitor Babler and together they promised to solve the internal disputes of the past and unify the party ahead of the next Austrian legislative election in 2024. Doskozil, who was officially party chairman for two days, also pledged his support for a SPÖ-Green-NEOS coalition after the 2024 election, and ruled out a coalition with the FPÖ and or the ÖVP.

==== After the result mix-up ====
After being informed by the party's election commission that the results were mixed up, elected new party chairman Babler called the events "the darkest day and low-point of Social Democracy in Austria" and apologized to party officials and Austrian voters for the problems caused. He asked the election commission to re-count the votes again to make sure there's a final credible result, only after which he would officially accept the results and become the new chairman. The re-counted and certified results are expected to be released on Tuesday, 6 June 2023. Doskozil accepted the news of the results being mixed up and announced his withdrawal from federal Austrian politics, instead focusing on his role as Governor of Burgenland in the future.

On 6 June 2023, the recount from Monday was certified without any changes, after no additional errors were found. The vote was recounted three times. The certified results were announced by the newly elected SPÖ election commission chairwoman Klaudia Frieben and an independent notary, after chairwoman Michaela Grubesa announced her resignation during the meeting on Tuesday. After the certified results were announced, Babler officially accepted his election as the new SPÖ-chairman. Babler once again apologized to voters and party officials and thanked Doskozil for his campaign and response to the results mix-up. Babler announced his intention to hold the next ordinary SPÖ party congress (scheduled for 2024) already in the fall of 2023, wanting delegates to vote again on the chairperson, or to confirm him. Babler also stated that he wanted party statutes changed so that only party members decide the new party chairpersons in the future, as well as coalition contracts. Babler announced a "summer tour" throughout Austria to re-gain trust in the SPÖ after his proposal to hold the ordinary party congress already during the fall of 2023 was approved by the SPÖ leadership committee on 7 June 2023.
