= Pamela Rendi-Wagner =

Austrian physician and politician (born 1971)

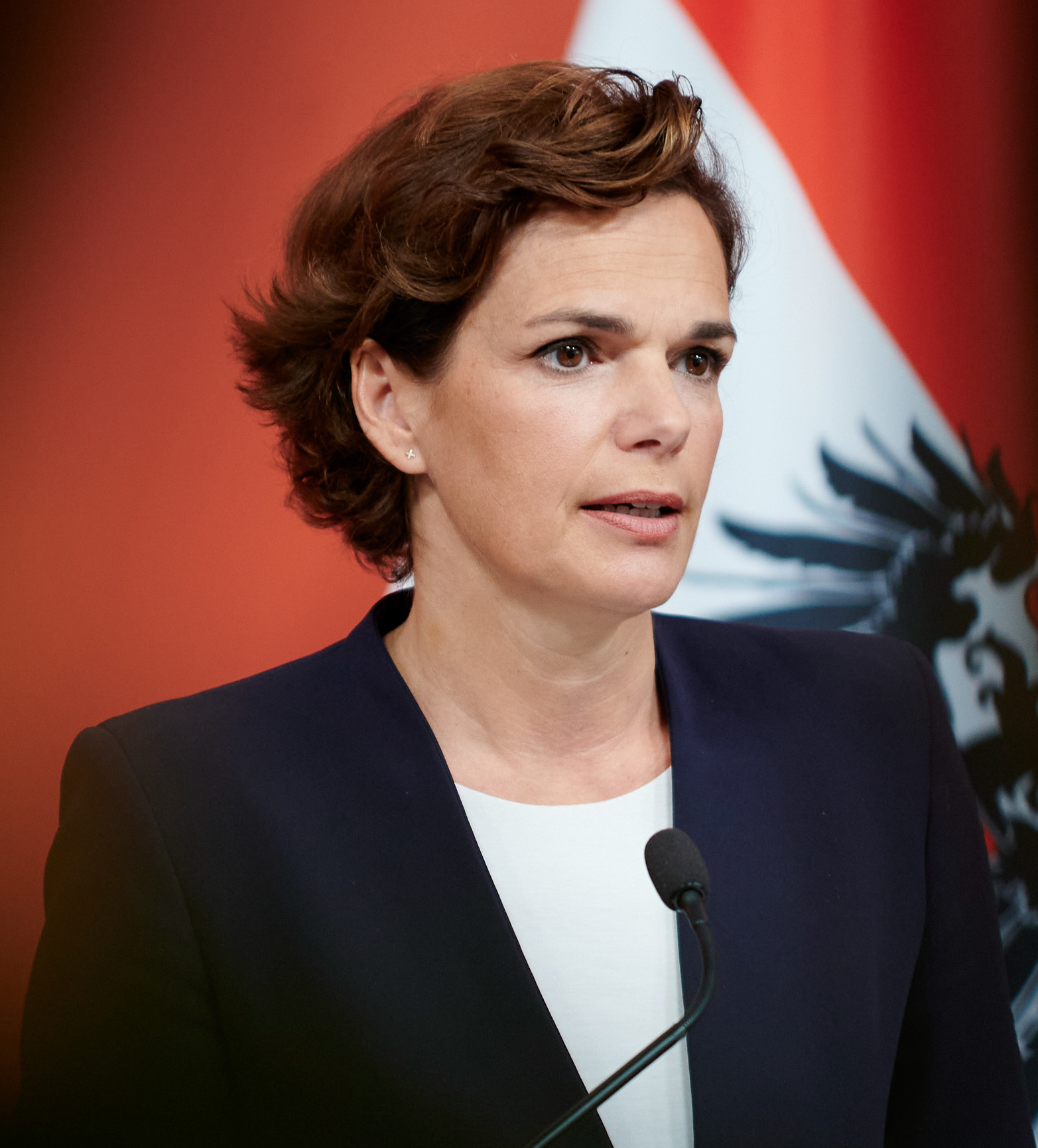
- Rendi-Wagner in October 2021

Director of the European Centre for Disease Prevention and Control
- Incumbent
- Assumed office 17 June 2024
- Preceded by: Andrea Ammon

Chair of the Social Democratic Party
- In office 24 November 2018 – 3 June 2023
- Preceded by: Christian Kern
- Succeeded by: Andreas Babler

Minister of Health and Women
- In office 8 March 2017 – 18 December 2017
- Chancellor: Christian Kern
- Preceded by: Sabine Oberhauser
- Succeeded by: Beate Hartinger-Klein

Member of the National Council
- In office 9 November 2017 – 30 June 2023
- Nominated by: Christian Kern
- Affiliation: Social Democratic Party

Personal details
- Born: Joy Pamela Wagner; 7 May 1971 (age 55) Vienna, Austria
- Party: Social Democratic Party
- Spouse: Michael Rendi
- Children: 2
- Education: University of Vienna (MD); London School of Hygiene & Tropical Medicine (MSc)

Pamela Rendi-Wagner (born Joy Pamela Wagner, 7 May 1971) is an Austrian physician and politician who is the current director of the European Centre for Disease Prevention and Control, and who previously served as chairwoman of the Social Democratic Party (SPÖ) from 2018 to 2023. She was the first woman to lead the SPÖ.

From 2011 to 2017, she served as director-general for public health in the Austrian Ministry of Health. She served as minister for health and women from March to December 2017. Rendi-Wagner was elected to the National Council for the SPÖ in the 2017 election, and became parliamentary leader in October 2018. She was the SPÖ's lead candidate in the 2019 election. In June 2024, Rendi-Wagner was appointed Director of the European Centre for Disease Prevention and Control.

== Early life ==
Joy Pamela Wagner was born in Vienna and grew up in the Favoriten district as the daughter of Wolfgang and Christine Wagner, née Tschabitscher. When her parents divorced, she stayed with her mother. She attended the GRG 12 Erlgasse in Meidling and graduated in 1989. She then studied medicine at the University of Vienna and received her doctorate in 1996. From 1996 to 1997, she studied Infection and Health in the Tropics at the London School of Hygiene & Tropical Medicine and graduated with a master's degree (MSc). In 1997, she obtained a diploma in Tropical Medicine and Hygiene from the Royal College of Physicians.

== Health career ==
In 1998, Wagner returned to the University of Vienna. Between 1998 and 2002 she worked in the Department of Specific Prophylaxis and Tropical Medicine, from 2002 to 2003 in the Department of Infectious Diseases and Tropical Medicine at the Kaiser Franz Josef Hospital, and from 2003 to 2007 again at the Medical University of Vienna in the Department of Specific Prophylaxis and Tropical Medicine and at the Centre for Travel Medicine. She specialized clinically in specific prophylaxis and tropical hygiene and received her diploma from the Medical University of Vienna in 2005.

As project leader, Wagner established a network for epidemiological surveillance of important infectious diseases. As part of her research, the recommended interval between tick vaccinations was raised from three to five years. In 2008, she was awarded the qualification as university lecturer in the fields of specific prophylaxis and tropical medicine at the Medical University of Vienna. Subsequently, she worked internationally as a scientist in the fields of infection epidemiology, vaccine prevention and travel medicine.

Between 2008 and 2011, Rendi-Wagner was a guest lecturer at the Department of Epidemiology and Preventive Medicine, School of Public Health, Tel Aviv University in Israel. Between 2012 and 2017, she was a guest lecturer at the Centre for Public Health at the Medical University of Vienna. From 2011 to 2017, Rendi-Wagner took over Section III (Public Health and Medical Affairs) in the Ministry of Health and was chairwoman of the Office for Safety in Health Care (BASG) and a member of the Health Commission.

== Political career ==
In 2012, Rendi-Wagner joined the Association of Social Democratic University Graduates, an organization affiliated with the SPÖ. Following the death of Minister for Health and Women Sabine Oberhauser in February 2017, Rendi-Wagner was appointed as her successor on 8 March, replacing interim minister Alois Stöger. She served in the government of Chancellor Christian Kern. Only shortly before her inauguration, she became a member of the SPÖ. She became a member of the National Council in the election in October; due to the change in government, she left the ministry on 18 December 2017. She declined to return as an official in the Ministry of Health. Thereafter, Rendi-Wagner became the SPÖ's spokeswoman for health. She joined the joint committee as well as the committees for health, environment, economy, and foreign affairs, becoming deputy chair of the health committee.

After Kern announced his pending resignation as SPÖ chairman in September 2018, the party executive board designated Rendi-Wagner as his successor. She was confirmed at a party convention on 24 November with 97.8% of votes, becoming the first woman to lead the SPÖ in the party's history. She stated that she wanted to define the party as modern, progressive, and cosmopolitan, pushing it to "have the courage to provide simple and understandable answers" and stand for equal opportunity and justice. She sought to provide a sharp contrast with the ÖVP and FPÖ without opposing the government dogmatically. She said that she was "not a fan of the left-right split", and was perceived as seeking to bring the party to the political centre.

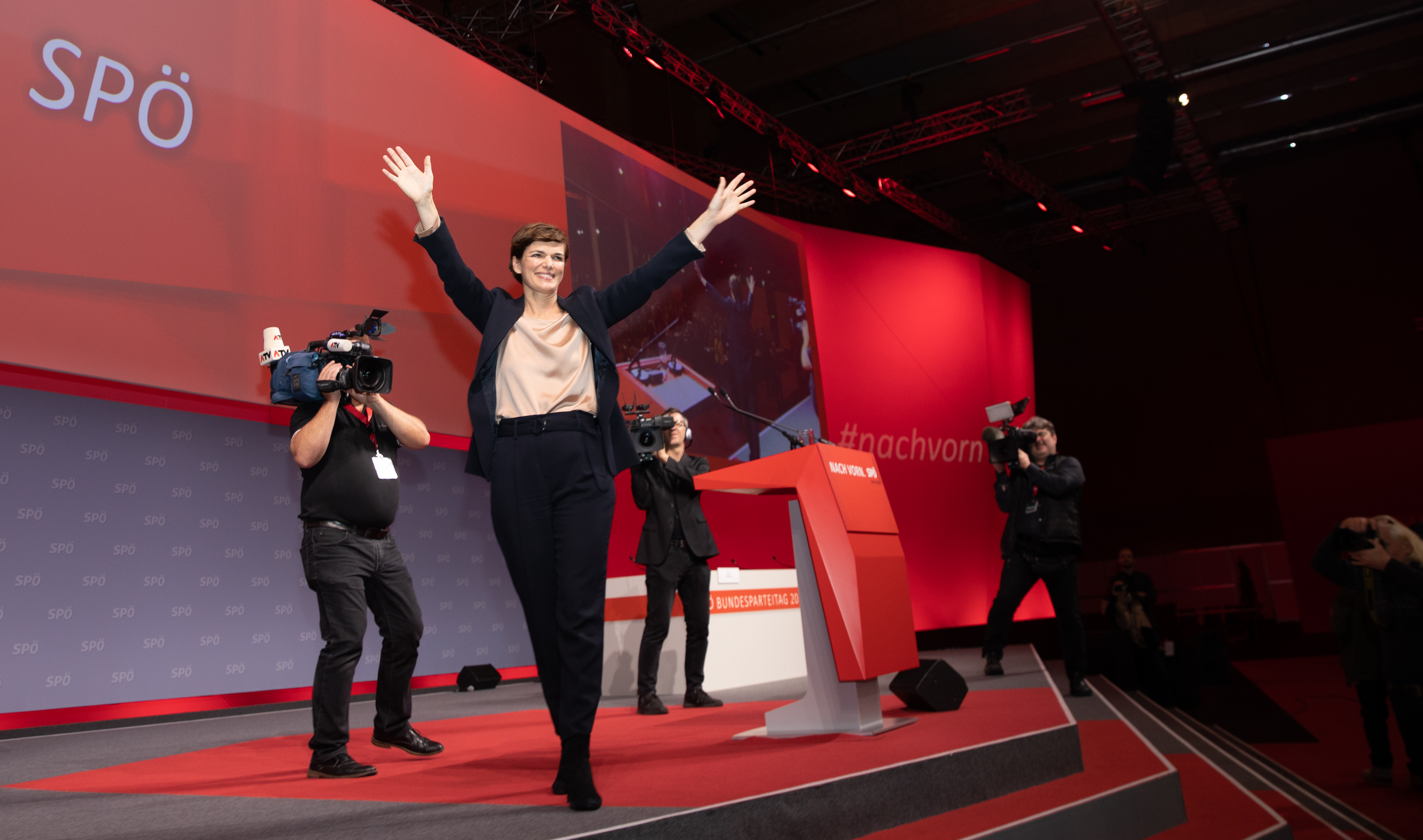
Rendi-Wagner at the SPÖ party convention 2018

On 28 May 2019, Rendi-Wagner was unanimously confirmed by the SPÖ executive as the party's top candidate for the 2019 federal election. The party won 21.2% of votes, a loss of 5.7 percentage points, its worst ever result. Nonetheless, it remained the second largest party and largest opposition party. In the new National Council, Rendi-Wagner became foreign policy spokeswoman for the SPÖ. She also became chairwoman of the foreign affairs committee, and joined the standing subcommittee of the joint committee.

In February 2020, the SPÖ announced a survey of party members to gauge their confidence in Rendi-Wagner and their opinion on key issues of social democracy. The survey was completed on 2 April, though the review of results was suspended due to the COVID-19 pandemic. The results were announced on 6 May: with a participation rate of 41.3%, Rendi-Wagner received 71.4% approval, and therefore announced that she would remain party leader. She presented a platform concept titled "New Solidarity for Austria", which sought to the strengthen the welfare state, with a focus on health and care, as well as investments in employment and tax justice.

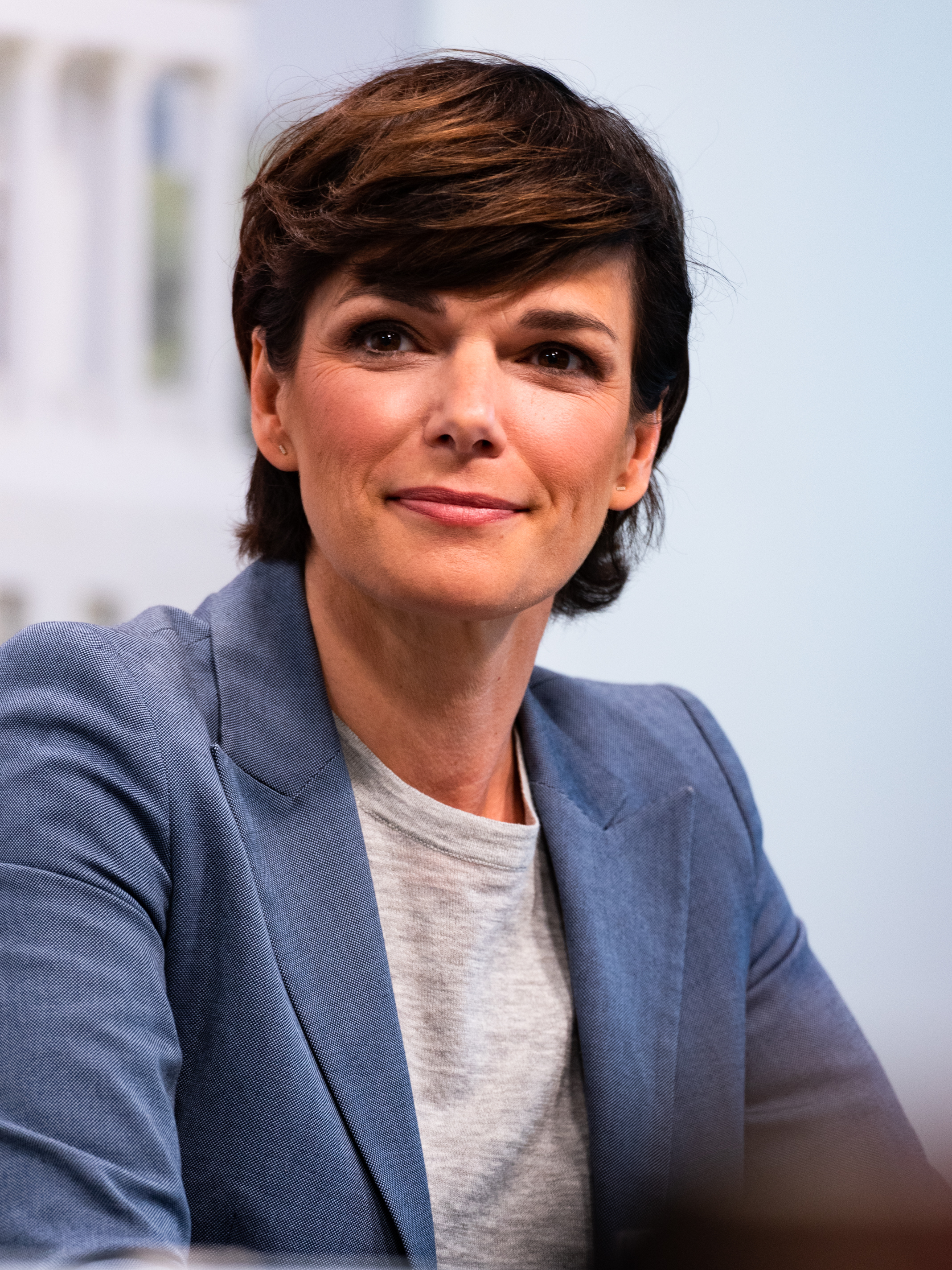
Rendi-Wagner in April 2020

A January 2021 poll indicated that Rendi-Wagner was the most popular politician in Austria, with 36% public approval. This was higher than Chancellor Sebastian Kurz (35%) and health minister Rudolf Anschober (32%). During the late 2021 political crisis, which saw the resignation and subsequent retirement of Kurz, Rendi-Wagner accused the government of being "preoccupied with itself" during the pandemic, and void of any mandate to continue in office. She called for new elections to be held once the fourth wave had been suppressed. Rendi-Wagner was the first SPÖ-leader to face a leadership election in mid-2023. The results of the membership election were announced on 22 May 2023 and Rendi-Wagner came in third and last place with 31.35% of the votes.

Following the results of the election, on 23 May 2023, Rendi-Wagner announced that she would not be a candidate at the extraordinary party congress on 3 June 2023 and subsequently announced her orderly resignation as party leader and parliamentary group leader. She would remain in office until a new party leader and parliamentary group leader had been elected. At the party congress on 3 June 2023 according to the first count, Babler lost with 279 votes (46.81%) against Hans Peter Doskozil who received 316 (53.02%) of the delegates' votes; however, after a recount showed that the results were incorrectly tabulated, with Babler having won the votes attributed to Doskozil, Babler was proclaimed the winner and declared new chair of the Social Democratic Party of Austria.

== Personal life ==
Rendi-Wagner's mother was a kindergarten teacher, her father is professor of social psychology. In regular contacts, her politically engaged father introduced her to political and feminist ideas. She has two half-brothers. Pamela Rendi-Wagner is married to Michael Rendi, a former Austrian ambassador to Israel who was cabinet chief of chancellery minister Thomas Drozda (SPÖ), and has two daughters with him.
