= Andreas Babler =

Austrian politician (born 1973)

- Babler in 2026

Vice-Chancellor of Austria
- Incumbent
- Assumed office 3 March 2025
- Chancellor: Christian Stocker
- Preceded by: Werner Kogler

Minister for Housing, Arts, Culture, Media and Sport
- Incumbent
- Assumed office 3 March 2025
- Chancellor: Christian Stocker
- Preceded by: Werner Kogler

Chair of the Social Democratic Party
- Incumbent
- Assumed office 6 June 2023
- Preceded by: Pamela Rendi-Wagner

Member of the National Council
- In office 24 October 2024 – 6 March 2025
- Affiliation: Social Democratic Party

Member of the Federal Council
- In office 23 March 2023 – 23 October 2024
- Affiliation: Social Democratic Party

Mayor of Traiskirchen
- In office 29 April 2014 – 24 October 2024
- Preceded by: Friedrich Knotzer
- Succeeded by: Sabrina Divoky

Personal details
- Born: Andreas Babler; 25 February 1973 (age 53) Mödling, Austria
- Party: Social Democratic Party
- Spouse: Karin Blum
- Children: 1
- Education: University for Continuing Education Krems (MSc)
- Website: Official website

Andreas "Andi" Babler (born 25 February 1973) is an Austrian politician who has been the leader of the Social Democratic Party of Austria (SPÖ) since June 2023. Since March 2025, he has served as Vice-Chancellor of Austria and Minister for Housing, Arts, Culture, Media, and Sport in the Stocker government.

From 2024 to 2025, he was a member of the National Council, where he served as chairman of the SPÖ parliamentary group. From 2014 to 2024, he was mayor of Traiskirchen, and from 2023 to 2024, he was a member of the Federal Council.

Babler has described himself as Marxist, and has been described as a left-wing populist.

== Early life ==
Babler grew up in a Semperit family in Möllersdorf, part of the municipality of Traiskirchen. His father, Werner Babler (born 1947), was a firefighter.

Babler attended higher technical college in Mödling (without graduating with a Matura), and subsequently worked in machine construction and as a warehouse worker. After military service and one year as a professional soldier (1993–1994), he worked as a shift worker and shift supervisor in mineral water production.

After starting his career in politics, he studied political communication at the University for Continuing Education Krems, earning a Master of Science in 2009.

== Political career ==
In 1989, Babler joined the Socialist Youth Austria (SJÖ), where he rose to become state secretary for SJ Lower Austria, federal secretary of the SJÖ in 1996, and later vice president of the International Union of Socialist Youth (IUSY). He was considered part of the Marxist–Leninist "Stamokap” wing of the Socialist Youth and strongly supported socialist Yugoslavia during the 1990s. In 1999, Babler organised a “Vienna Tribunal” opposing the International Criminal Tribunal for the former Yugoslavia and criticised the Rambouillet Agreement.

In 1995, he became a member of the town council of Traiskirchen. In 1996, he drew criticism for an article attacking the Catholic Church and calling for the removal of crucifixes from classrooms, remarks he later described as satire. He became mayor of Traiskirchen in 2014. In his first election he received the best election result for the SPÖ in Traiskirchen since 1945.

Babler gained nationwide attention because of the Traiskirchen refugee camp, the largest refugee camp in Austria and one of the largest in Europe. During the European refugee crisis of 2015, he sharply criticised the asylum policies of Interior Minister Johanna Mikl-Leitner and organised protests calling for more humane refugee accommodation.

Following strong results in the 2023 Lower Austrian state election, Babler entered the Federal Council in April 2023. He announced his candidacy in the 2023 SPÖ leadership election on 23 March 2023. Although initially declared defeated by Hans Peter Doskozil at the extraordinary party congress on 3 June 2023, a recount revealed that the results had been reversed due to an Excel error, and Babler officially became SPÖ leader on 6 June 2023. He was reelected party chairman in March 2026 with 81.51% of delegate votes.

In October 2024, Babler became chairman of the SPÖ parliamentary group in the National Council and resigned as mayor of Traiskirchen. After the 2024 legislative election, the SPÖ entered a coalition government with the Austrian People’s Party (ÖVP) and NEOS, and Babler became Vice-Chancellor and Minister for Housing, Arts, Culture, Media, and Sport.

== Political positions ==
Babler has described himself as a Marxist, but has said that he did not stand for concepts such as expropriations and a dictatorship of the proletariat. He has been described as a left-wing populist. He had previously ruled out a coalition government with ÖVP, but backtracked in 2024. He is a former member of the SPÖ's Marxist–Leninist "Stamokap" wing, and was criticised in the run-up to the 2023 SPÖ congress for a video in which he had described the European Union (EU) as "the most aggressive foreign policy alliance that ever existed" and "worse than NATO", adding the EU was as an "imperialist" project with a few social standards". Babler said he did not advocate an Austrian exit from the EU but was in favour of a socially minded reform of the European treaties.

As SPÖ leader, Babler has advocated a 32-hour workweek with full wage compensation, inheritance and wealth taxes, cannabis legalisation, free public transport for low-income people, free lunches in schools and kindergartens, energy price caps, and stronger grassroots democracy within the SPÖ. He has also supported lower barriers to Austrian citizenship and expanded voting rights for foreigners. On defence policy, Babler opposes NATO membership for Austria and criticised Austrian cooperation with NATO initiatives. Although he previously advocated abolishing compulsory military service, by 2023 he stated that he supported conscription.

Early in his tenure as leader in June 2023, Babler welcomed further arms deliveries from the European Union to Ukraine. Media noted his moderation in governing compared to his leadership campaign.

== Personal life ==
In 1997, Babler met his future wife Karin Blum, a native of Vorarlberg who became the first Socialist chairperson in the history of the Austrian Students' Association (ÖH) in Innsbruck in 2005. She later became chairwoman of the SPÖ Traiskirchen city party and a municipal councillor there. They married in 2009 and have one daughter.
