= Christian Kern =

Chancellor of Austria From 2016 to 2017

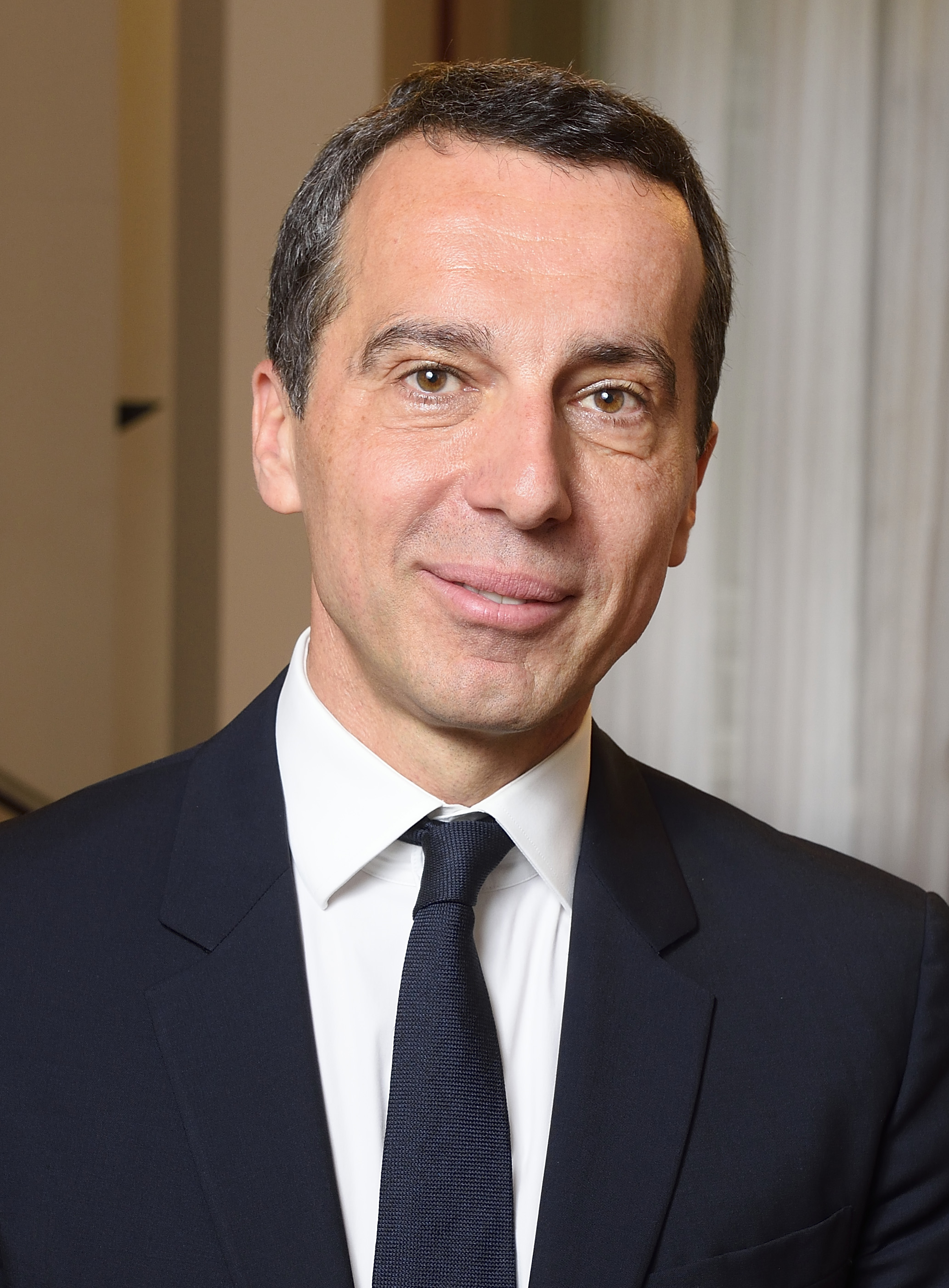
- Kern in 2016

Chancellor of Austria
- In office 17 May 2016 – 18 December 2017
- President: Heinz Fischer; Alexander Van der Bellen
- Vice-Chancellor: Reinhold Mitterlehner; Wolfgang Brandstetter
- Preceded by: Werner Faymann
- Succeeded by: Sebastian Kurz

Chair of the Social Democratic Party
- In office 25 June 2016 – 25 September 2018
- Preceded by: Werner Faymann
- Succeeded by: Pamela Rendi-Wagner

Member of the National Council
- In office 9 November 2017 – 15 November 2018
- Nominated by: Himself
- Affiliation: Social Democratic Party

Chair of the Austrian Federal Railways
- In office 7 June 2010 – 17 May 2016
- Preceded by: Martin Huber
- Succeeded by: Andreas Matthä

Personal details
- Born: Christian Kern; 4 January 1966 (age 60) Vienna, Austria
- Party: Social Democratic Party
- Spouse(s): Karin Wessely (m. 1985; div. 1988) Eveline Steinberger
- Children: 4
- Education: University of Vienna
- Profession: Politician; businessman
- Website: Party website

Christian Kern (Austrian German pronunciation: [ˈkrɪsti̯a(ː)n ˈkɛrn]; born 4 January 1966) is an Austrian businessman and former politician who served as Chancellor of Austria from 17 May 2016 to 18 December 2017 and chairman of the Social Democratic Party from 25 June 2016 to 25 September 2018.

A business journalist by profession, the member of Austria's Social Democratic Party served as spokesman of the SPÖ's parliamentary group leader in the mid-1990s, before he became a senior manager in Austria's leading electricity company Verbund AG. In 2010, Kern was appointed CEO of the state-owned Austrian Federal Railways (ÖBB), chairing the Community of European Railway and Infrastructure Companies (CER) from 2014 onwards. Following the resignation of Werner Faymann amidst the presidential election, the governing Social Democrats nominated Kern for the office of chancellor.

Kern was sworn in as Chancellor of Austria on 17 May 2016, vowing to continue the grand coalition with the People's Party (ÖVP) but promising a New Deal that would bring about more jobs by cutting red tape while ensuring ordinary workers receive a share of economic prosperity. Kern criticized the Austrian political elite as being power-obsessed and devoid of a meaningful political agenda about the country's future.

== Early life and education ==
Kern was raised in Simmering, a working-class district of Vienna, as the son of an electrician and a secretary. He studied journalism and communication at the University of Vienna followed by postgraduate education at the Management Zentrum St. Gallen.

== Career ==
Kern started his career in 1989 as a business journalist writing for the Wirtschaftspressedienst and Austrian business magazine Option. In 1991, he became an assistant of the Federal Chancellery's undersecretary of state for civil service, Peter Kostelka. When Kostelka became chairman of the Social Democratic Party (SPÖ) parliamentary group in 1994, Kern remained his chief of office and spokesman. In 1997, Kern moved to the largest Austrian electricity supplier, the Verbund AG, where from 1999 he oversaw marketing and sales. In 2007 he was appointed to be a member of the Board of Directors, additionally overseeing foreign mergers & acquisitions, investments, international business, trading, and the Austrian high-voltage transmission grid

=== CEO of the Austrian Federal Railways ===
In 2010, Kern was selected to take over the post as CEO of the Austrian Federal Railways (ÖBB). He was appointed chairman of the Community of European Railway and Infrastructure Companies (CER) in 2014. Kern has been a board member of FK Austria Wien since 2009.

In 2012, ÖBB celebrated the 175th anniversary of the Nordbahn, the earliest predecessor company marking the start of rail transport in Austria. Kern inaugurated an exhibition on the company's complicity with the Third Reich, named "The Suppressed Years – Railway and National Socialism in Austria 1938–1945". He referred to that period as "the darkest part of our company's history," adding that "We are obliged to commemorate and with this documentation we would like to further contribute to coming to terms with the past. No matter how incredible these events may seem to us today, we need to clearly accept these times as part of our ÖBB history." The exhibition later went on tour and was presented at the European Parliament's parliamentary building in Brussels. For his extraordinary engagement accounting for the company's past, in June 2013 the Vienna Israelite Community awarded Kern the Marietta and Friedrich Torberg Medal.

In the course of the 2015 European migrant crisis, Kern organized the transport of hundred thousands of migrants coming from the "Balkan route" across the country. He is considered a supporter of German Chancellor Angela Merkel's migration policy. Roman Hebenstreit, a leading Austrian trade unionist who is also chairman of the ÖBB's works council, described Kern in 2016 as "the first ÖBB boss to really stand by his workers."

=== Chancellor of Austria ===
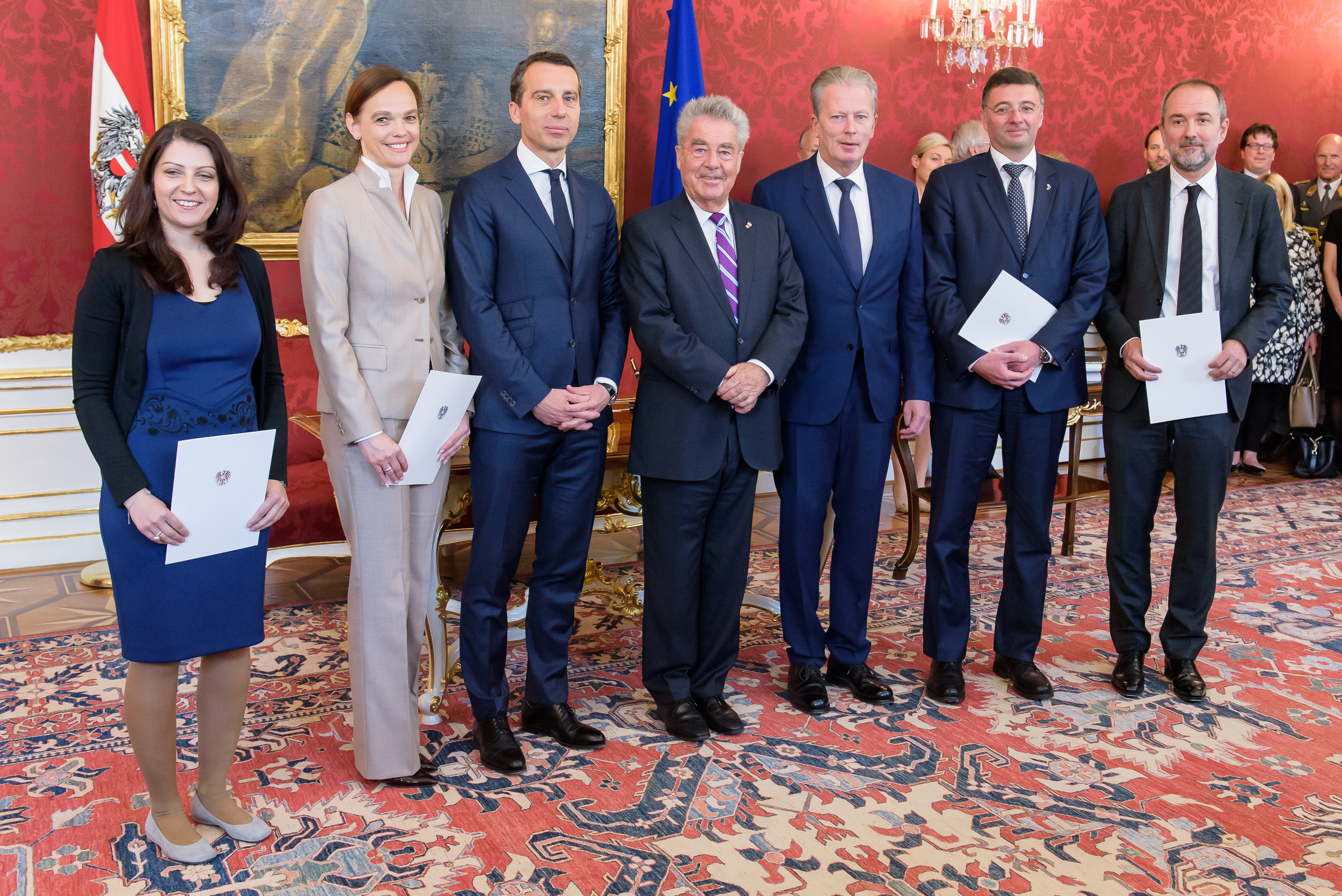
Kern with outgoing President Heinz Fischer and Vice Chancellor Reinhold Mitterlehner at the swearing-in ceremony of his new cabinet members on 18 May 2016

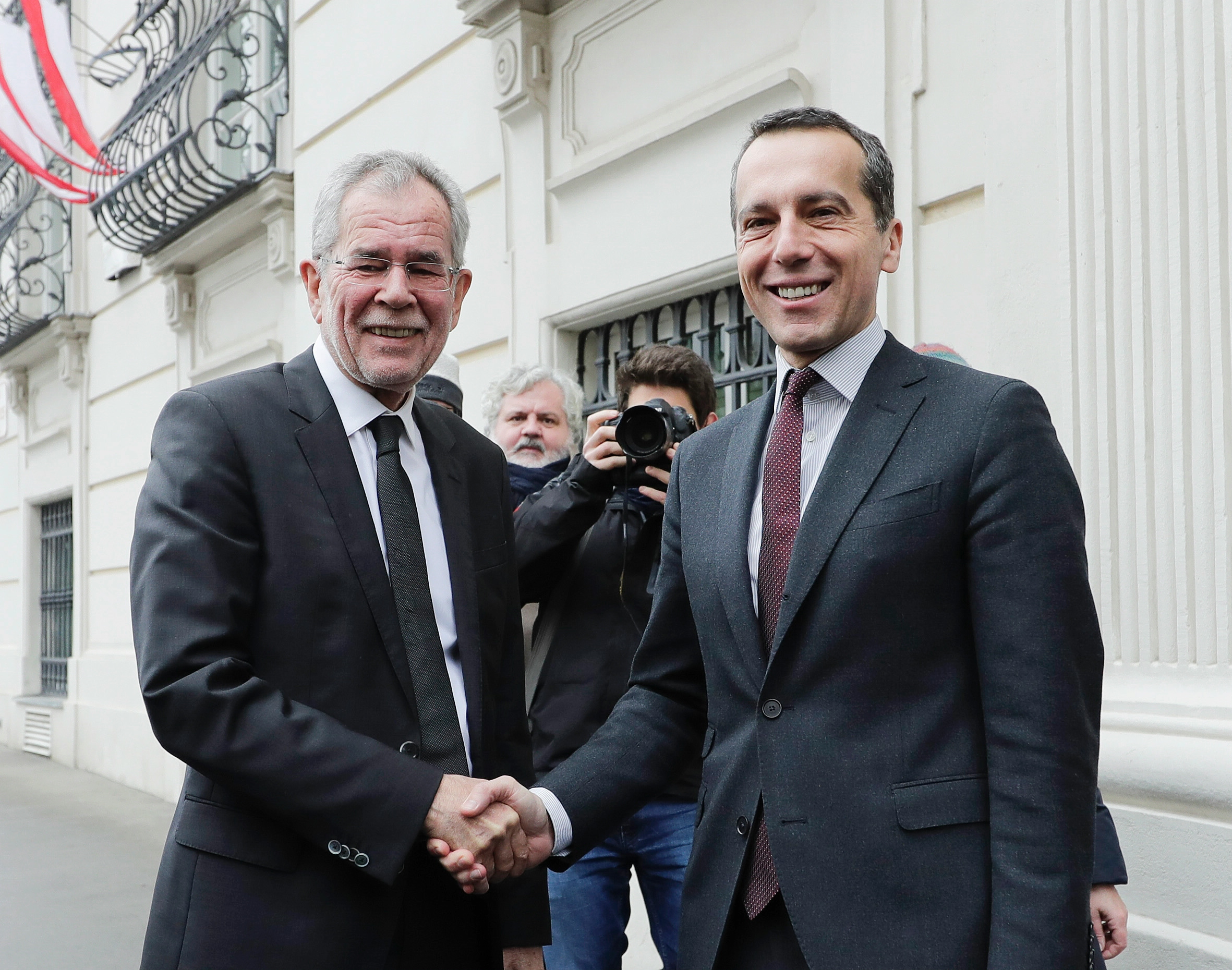
Kern with Austrian President Alexander Van der Bellen, 20 December 2016

Since 2014, Kern was repeatedly named as one of the possible successors for Werner Faymann's chancellor post. In 2015, Austrian news magazine profil referred to him as the "Chancellor of hearts" and the Federal Railways he led as "the only state institution that flawlessly worked amidst the refugee crisis". Half a year later, when on 9 May 2016 Chancellor Faymann resigned from all his posts, Kern was again named one of the candidates alongside Time Warner manager Gerhard Zeiler and former Siemens manager Brigitte Ederer. On a 12 May party session, the Social Democrats agreed on nominating Kern for the country's highest executive office. He was announced to be appointed the new chancellor by 17 May, and to be nominated as party chairman at the upcoming party congress on 25 June. Kern was sworn into office on 17 May by outgoing President Heinz Fischer. At his first press conference, Kern called for a change in the style of cooperation within the coalition government, warning the two parties risked otherwise "disappearing from the screen". He reaffirmed his position that in the refugee crisis, Austria was right not to "leave women and children standing in the rain", while ensuring order and security.

In spite of his credentials as a manager, Kern's nomination of members of the party's left wing, Sonja Wehsely and Jörg Leichtfried, as new ministers was interpreted as a turn towards the party's left. The appointment of Wehsely, who is known for her staunch pro-asylum course during the European migrant crisis, was however considered all too controversial, with political analyst Thomas Hofer referring to it as a declaration of war (kleine Kampfansage) against conservative coalition partner ÖVP. Wehsely ultimately declined and decided she would stay city councillor in Vienna. At the time, observers expected Kern to follow the centrist examples of German chancellor Gerhard Schröder or Britain's Tony Blair, combining pro-business policies with a social conscience.

Kern appointed Muna Duzdar, a lawyer and chairwoman of the Palestininian-Austrian Society, as state secretary in the Chancellery, where she will be the first Muslim to hold a government post. The fact that Duzdar, who has previously come out as a sharp critic of Israel, will now be in charge of Jewish community affairs, irritated the Jewish community. According to The Jerusalem Post author Samuel Laster, Duzdar's appointment may however be considered a "signal of openness" for Kern who is "widely regarded as a friend of Israel." In August 2016, Kern announced his opposition to Turkey's accession to the European Union. Soon after taking office, Kern's government implemented several law-and-order measures, including a ban on Muslim face-covering veils and a tightening of immigration rules.

In June 2017, Kern criticized the draft of new U.S. sanctions against Russia that target EU–Russia energy projects, including Nord Stream 2 gas pipeline. In a joint statement, Kern and Germany's foreign minister Sigmar Gabriel said that "Europe's energy supply is a matter for Europe, and not for the United States of America." In October 2017's snap general election, Kern's SPÖ got defeated by Sebastian Kurz's ÖVP. Kurz decided to form a coalition with the FPÖ. From December 2017, Kern was leader of the opposition.

=== Resignation from politics ===
In September 2018, Kern announced that he would resign as national party leader and instead run as top candidate for the Austrian Social Democrats in the European Parliament elections. In October 2018, he announced he was quitting politics completely. His successor as party leader is Pamela Rendi-Wagner and Andreas Schieder was presented as top candidate in the EU Parliament elections.

== Other activities ==
=== Corporate boards ===
- Russian Railways, member of the board of directors (2019–2022)

=== Non-profit organizations ===
- European China Business Council, President (since 2019)
- FK Austria Wien, member of the board of trustees
- Rechtskomitee LAMBDA (RKL), member of the board of trustees
- Business Forum of the Social Democratic Party of Germany, member of the political advisory board (since 2018)

== Personal life ==
In 1985, Kern married Karin Wessely, with whom he has three sons. In 1988, his marriage with Wessely, who was a local SPÖ politician in Mödling, a district capital south of Vienna, ended in divorce. Wessely supported his nomination as successor to Faymann and highly praised him as a charismatic personality who is able to unite the more left-aligned and the more right-aligned factions of their party. With his second wife, Eveline Steinberger, he has a daughter. This marriage ended in a divorce in 2022.

Business positions
Preceded by Martin Huber	Chair of the Austrian Federal Railways; 2010–2016	Succeeded by Andreas Matthä
Party political offices
Preceded by Werner Faymann	Chair of the Social Democratic Party; 2016–2018	Succeeded by Pamela Rendi-Wagner
Political offices
Preceded by Werner Faymann	Chancellor of Austria; 2016–2017	Succeeded by Sebastian Kurz
