= List of terrorist incidents in 1981 =

This is a timeline of incidents in 1981 that have been labelled as "terrorism" and are not believed to have been carried out by a government or its forces (see state terrorism and state-sponsored terrorism).

== Guidelines ==
- To be included, entries must be notable (have a stand-alone article) and described by a consensus of reliable sources as "terrorism".
- List entries must comply with the guidelines outlined in the manual of style under MOS:TERRORIST.
- Casualty figures in this list are the total casualties of the incident including immediate casualties and later casualties (such as people who succumbed to their wounds long after the attacks occurred).
- Casualties listed are the victims. Perpetrator casualties are listed separately (e.g. x (+y) indicate that x victims and y perpetrators were killed/injured).
- Casualty totals may be underestimated or unavailable due to a lack of information. A figure with a plus (+) sign indicates that at least that many people have died (e.g. 10+ indicates that at least 10 people have died) – the actual toll could be considerably higher. A figure with a plus (+) sign may also indicate that over that number of people are victims.
- If casualty figures are 20 or more, they will be shown in **bold**. In addition, figures for casualties more than 50 will also be **underlined**.
- Incidents are limited to one per location per day. If multiple attacks occur in the same place on the same day, they will be merged into a single incident.
- In addition to the guidelines above, the table also includes the following categories:

0 people were killed/injured by the incident.
1–19 people were killed/injured by the incident.
20–49 people were killed/injured by the incident.
50–99 people were killed/injured by the incident.
100+ people were killed/injured by the incident.

== List ==
Date	Type	Dead	Injured	Location	Details	Perpetrator	Part of
12 January	Bombings	0	0	San Juan, Puerto Rico	11 men disguised as soldiers penetrated into the Puerto Rico Air National Guard and placed bombs on several aircraft, destroying several of them.	Boricua Popular Army	
March 3	Armed Assault	0	1	Puerto Montt, Chile	A commando of the MIR assaulted a supermarket, injuring a policeman	Revolutionary Left Movement (Chile)	Armed resistance in Chile (1973–90)
28 March	Hijacking	2 (+5 attackers)	2	Indonesia	5 members of the Islamic extremist group Komando Jihad hijack Garuda Indonesian Airways Flight 206. They kill the pilot and an Indonesian commando before all five of them are killed.	Komando Jihad	Terrorism in Indonesia
1 May	Assassination	1	0	Vienna, Austria	Austrian Socialist Party politician Heinz Nittel who was also the president of the Austrian–Israeli Friendship League is assassinated by 21-year-old Iraqi Hesham Mohammed Rajeh, who was also linked to the 1981 Vienna synagogue attack	Hesham Mohammed Rajeh	Israeli–Palestinian conflict
13 May	Attempted Assassination	0	3	St. Peter's Square, Vatican City	Pope John Paul II was shot and wounded by Mehmet Ali Ağca while he was entering the square.	Mehmet Ali Ağca	
27 April	Kidnapping	2	0	Naples, Italy	Christian Democracy politician Ciro Cirillo is kidnapped and his two bodyguards are killed by the Red Brigades. Cirillo was held until 25 July when a ransom was paid.	Red Brigades	
16 May	Bombing	1		New York City, United States	One dead in an explosion in the toilets at the Pan Am terminal at JFK airport. The bombing is claimed by the Puerto Rican Resistance Army.	Puerto Rican Resistance Army	Terrorism in the United States
May 22	Bombing	0	2	Santiago, Chile	A high powered bomb exploded in the PDI headquarters, wounding 2 civilians	Revolutionary Left Movement (Chile)	Armed resistance in Chile (1973–90)
12 June	Attempted Bombing, Shooting	4	Unknown	San José, Costa Rica	An attempt to dynamite the bust of John F. Kennedy in a park in San Pedro de Montes de Oca, as a protest against American imperialism. Three policemen and a taxi driver died during an encounter. The members were arrested.	"La Familia" militant group	Terrorism in Costa Rica
25 June	Shooting	1	0	Las Serritas de Managua, Nicaragua	An attack left one civilian killed. A far-right group called 19th of July Christian Resistance Brigade claimed responsibility for the attack.	19th of July Christian Resistance Brigade	Nicaraguan Revolution
28 June	Haft-e Tir bombing	74 (+1)		Tehran, Iran	74 people are killed in a suicide bombing targeting a meeting of leaders of the Islamic Republican Party at the party's headquarters.	Several suspects including SAVAK, the Ba'athist Iraq, the People's Mujahedin of Iran, and "Iraqi agents"	
11 July	Shooting	9	Unknown	Caqueta, Colombia	Members of the FARC ambush an army patrol at Riecito, in the jurisdiction of Puerto Rico municipality. Two lieutenants and seven noncommissioned officers die.	FARC	Colombian conflict
15 July	Shooting	12 (+11)	Unknown	Caqueta, Colombia	Guerrillas of the M-19, ambush two patrols of the Army in the vicinity of Belen de los Andaquies. Twelve soldiers and 9 subversives die. Another 2 guerrillas are killed the same day on the road that leads from Florencia to Morelia.	M-19	Colombian conflict
3 August	Bombing	2	72	Piraeus, Greece	A bomb placed by Palestinian terrorists exploded in a travel agency killing two and wounding seventy two other bystanders.	15 May Organization	Israeli–Palestinian conflict
10 August	Bombing	0	0	Athens, Greece	Two bombs exploded outside the Israeli embassy with no victims	15 May Organization	Israeli–Palestinian conflict
20 August	Shooting	6	5	Meta, Colombia, Colombia	FARC guerrillas ambush troops from the 21 Vargas Battalion in the vicinity of La Uribe and La Macarena. 6 soldiers die.	FARC	Colombian conflict
29 August	Shooting, grenade	2	30	Vienna, Austria	Machine gun and grenade attack on the Stadttempel synagogue, killing two people and wounding 30. Marwan Hasan and Hesham Mohammed Rajeh were convicted.	Abu Nidal Organization	Israeli–Palestinian conflict
24–25 September	Shooting, hostage-taking	1	2	Paris, France	Four gunmen from the Armenian Secret Army for the Liberation of Armenia open fire on the Turkish consulate before taking 56 hostages. One guard was killed and two other people were wounded.	ASALA	
6 October	Assassination	11 (+1 attacker)	28 (+3 attackers)	Cairo, Egypt	4 Egyptian Islamic Jihad assassins led by Khalid Islambouli opened fire on a victory parade led by President Anwar Sadat, killing him and 10 others and wounding 28. 1 gunman was killed and the three others were arrested and executed.	Egyptian Islamic Jihad	
13 October	Attack, Shooting	12	Unknown	Colombia	In a series of assaults perpetrated in Planeta Rica (Córdoba), Valparaíso (Caqueta) and Pavarando Grande (Antioquia), FARC guerrillas massacre 12 peasants.	FARC	Colombian conflict
20 October	Hijacking	0	0	Medellín, Colombia	M-19 rebels seize a plane of Aeropesca, and load with arms in La Guajira before abandoning it in the country's southern jungles.	M-19	Colombian conflict
20 October	Bombing	3	106	Antwerp, Belgium	Truck bomb attack on a synagogue. Three killed and 106 wounded.	Unknown	
20 October	Robbery, murder	3	3	Nanuet, New York, United States	Members of the May 19th Communist Organization (made up of former Black Liberation Army and Weather Underground members) rob a Brink's armored car a mall, killing the guard and two police officers who responded to the scene.	May 19th Communist Organization	
14 November	Assassination	2	0	Belfast, United Kingdom	The Provisional IRA (PIRA) shot dead Ulster Unionist Party MP Rev Robert Bradford, at Community Centre, Finaghy, along with another man (Kenneth Campbell), who was the caretaker of the premises.	Provisional IRA	The Troubles
29 November	Car bombing	64	135	Damascus, Syria	A car bomb destroys four apartment buildings in the Azbakya district, leaving more than 200 people dead. The Front for the Liberation of Lebanon from Foreigners claimed responsibility for the attack, while the Syrian government put blame on the Muslim Brotherhood.	Syrian Muslim Brotherhood	Islamist uprising in Syria
15 December	Suicide car bombing	61	110	Beirut, Lebanon	A suicide bomber affiliated with the Iranian group Al-Dawa drove a truck into the Iraqi embassy, killing Lebanon's ambassador to Iraq, Abdul Razzak Lafta, and 60 others.	Al-Dawa	Iran–Iraq War
17 December	Kidnapping	0	0	Verona, Italy	US Army Brigadier General James L. Dozier is kidnapped from his apartment and held hostage for 42 days by the Red Brigades.	Red Brigades	

== See also ==
- List of terrorist incidents
