= Nittel (disambiguation) =

Nittel is a village municipality Rhineland-Palatinate, Germany.

Nittel may also refer to:

== Surname ==
- Nittel (surname), a surname of German origin
- Ahren Nittel (born 1983), ice hockey player
- Heinz Nittel (1931–1981), politician

== Other uses ==
- Nittel Nacht, Jewish scholastic name for Christmas Eve
