= Max Lercher =

Austrian politician (born 1986)

- Lercher in 2026

Member of the National Council
- In office 23 October 2019 – 23 October 2024
- Constituency: Upper Styria

Member of the Landtag Styria
- In office 21 October 2010 – 12 September 2018
- Succeeded by: Wolfgang Moitzi
- Constituency: Upper Styria

Personal details
- Born: 24 September 1986 (age 40) Judenburg, Austria
- Party: Social Democratic Party
- Education: University of Vienna
- Website: max-lercher.at

Maximilian Lercher (born 24 September 1986) is an Austrian politician and former member of the National Council. A member of the Social Democratic Party, he represented Upper Styria from October 2019 to October 2024. He was a member of the Landtag Styria from October 2010 to September 2018.

Lercher was born on 24 September 1986 in Judenburg. He is the son of a bus driver and a post office manager. He has a Bachelor's of Arts degree in political science from the University of Vienna. He was the Social Democratic Party (SPÖ)'s State Managing Director in Styria from 2014 to 2018 and the SPÖ's Federal Managing Director from 2018 to 2019. He was managing director of Leykam Medien AG, a company controlled by the SPÖ in Styria, from 2019 to 2023. In October 2019 the right wing Österreich newspaper claimed that Lercher had been given a three-year consulting contract with SPÖ at €20,000 per month but in fact the contract was between SPÖ and Leykam and Lercher's salary for being MD of Leykam was only €6,000 per month. In September 2023 he was appointed head of the Dr. Karl Renner Institute's state office in Burgenland.

Lercher was chairman of the Socialist Youth Austria (SJ)'s Styrian branch from 2008 to 2013. He has held various positions on the Upper Styria West and Styrian branches of the SPÖ as well as its federal executive. He was elected to the Landtag Styria at the 2010 state election. He resigned from the Landtag in September 2018 and was replaced by Wolfgang Moitzi. He was elected to the National Council at the 2019 legislative election. In September 2023 Lercher announced that he would not be seeking re-election.

Electoral history of Max Lercher
Election	Electoral district	Party	Votes	%	Result
2010 state election	Upper Styria	Social Democratic Party	761	0.80%	Elected
2015 state election	Upper Styria	Social Democratic Party	484	0.70%	Elected
2019 legislative	Upper Styria	Social Democratic Party	7,354	13.92%	Elected
2019 legislative	Styria	Social Democratic Party	1,966	1.49%	Not elected
2019 legislative	Federal List	Social Democratic Party	2,921	0.29%	Not elected
