= Mautern =

Mautern may refer to two municipalities in Austria:

- Mautern an der Donau, in Lower Austria
- Mautern in Steiermark, in Styria
