= Peter Strasser (disambiguation) =

Peter Strasser may refer to:

- Peter Strasser (1876–1918), German aviation leader in World War I
- Peter Strasser (chemist) (born 1969), German chemist
- Peter Strasser (politician) (1917–1962), Austrian politician
- Peter G. Strasser, American lawyer
