= Josef Gerl =

Austrian socialist (1912–1934)

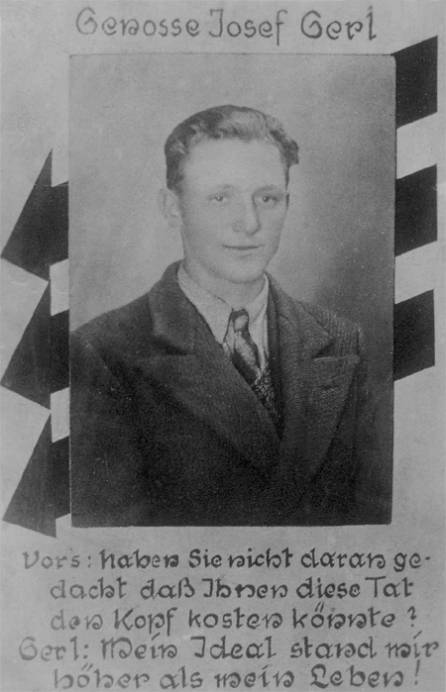
Picture of Josef Gerl with his last words before death

Josef Julius Gerl (13 February 1912 – 24 July 1934) was an Austrian socialist and member of the Socialist Workers Youth (SAJ).

== Life and political career ==
=== Life until 1934 ===
Gerl's family originated from Bohemia and moved to Vienna during the Habsburg monarchy. Josef Gerl trained as a goldsmith; however, after completing his apprenticeship and the legally required retention period, he was dismissed. The economic crisis deprived him of any means of livelihood.

Gerl had been a member of the Socialist Workers Youth (SAJ) since 1929.

In 1932, Gerl was sentenced to a month in prison for assaulting a Nazi.

=== February Uprising 1934 ===
In 1934, Gerl participated in the Austrian Civil War, fled to Czechoslovakia, and soon returned to Austria to continue the fight against Austrofascism.

=== Bomb attack ===
On the evening of July 20, 1934, Gerl, together with hatmaker's assistant Rudolf Anzböck, carried out a bomb attack on a signal installation of the Donauuferbahn, which caused only minor damage.

Afterward, Gerl and Anzböck attempted to flee to Czechoslovakia but missed the last train by a few minutes. They spent the night of July 21, 1934, in a café near the East Station, and after it closed, they stayed outside. Around 4 a.m., police sergeant Ferdinand Forstner noticed the two in a park at Keplerplatz in Vienna-Favoriten and checked their identification papers. When Forstner attempted a body search, Gerl drew a pistol and fired twice at the officer, gravely injuring him. The 33-year-old Forstner succumbed to his injuries three weeks later.

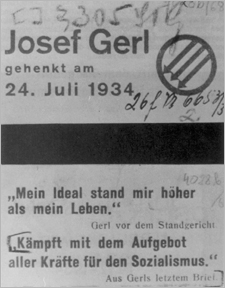
Death notice

Gerl and Anzböck were captured after a dramatic chase. During the subsequent police interrogation, they confessed to the bombing, which would have been difficult to prove otherwise.

==== Sentencing and execution ====
Due to their confession of planning and carrying out a bomb attack, Gerl and Anzböck were brought before a court-martial. Summary court-martial procedures had been introduced on November 10, 1933, for certain offenses. On July 12, 1934, the government—responding to the numerous bomb attacks at the time, mostly carried out by illegal National Socialists – extended the jurisdiction of the courts-martial to include offenses related to explosives (bomb attacks and illegal possession of explosives).

==== Death Sentence ====
The court-martial proceedings were conducted by a panel consisting of four judges and a prosecutor, with each case lasting no more than three days. If the verdict was unanimously guilty, the proceedings ended with a death sentence, which had to be carried out by hanging within three hours. No legal appeal was possible against the court-martial's decision; only a pardon from the Federal President Wilhelm Miklas could be granted.

During the court-martial proceedings, presided over by Senior Regional Court Counselor Dr. Alois Osio, Gerl stated that he "no longer firmly identified with Social Democracy" and sympathized with the National Socialists. However, this may have been a defensive claim, as Gerl had stated during the interrogation immediately after his arrest that the attack was intended to benefit Social Democracy by blaming it on the National Socialists. The plan was to ensure that the Austrian government would remain on hostile terms with Germany.

As a result of the bomb attack, Gerl and Anzböck were sentenced to death by the court-martial on July 24, 1934. Josef Gerl was hanged the same day. As the noose was placed around his neck, he shouted, "Long live Austrian liberty!" Anzböck had his sentence commuted to life in prison by the President and was released from prison in February 1938, after which he moved to the United States. Upon making his decision, Dollfuss remarked, "We can thank God that it was a Red and not a Nazi against whom we had to apply the law," as having to execute Nazis would've drawn immense pressure from Germany for clemency. The following day, Dollfuss was assassinated by Otto Planetta during a failed coup by Austrian Nazis. Thirteen Austrian Nazis, including Planetta, would be executed after the coup was crushed by government forces.

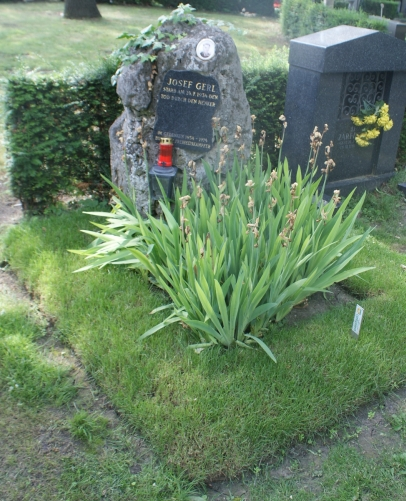
Grave of Josef Gerl

== Commemoration ==
Josef Gerl is buried in the Urn Grove of the Simmering Fire Hall (Section 8, Ring 2, Group 2, Number 23).

In the Spanish Civil War, a company of the International Brigades composed of Austrians was named "Josef Gerl" in his honor.

In 1949, the municipal housing complex built in 1931 at Stromstraße 39–45 in the 20th district of Vienna (Brigittenau) was renamed "Josef Gerl-Hof" in his memory.
