= Amelie Muthsam =

Austrian politician (born 2002)

Member of the Federal Council
- Incumbent
- Assumed office 27 March 2025
- Appointed by: Landtag of Lower Austria

Personal details
- Born: 16 November 2002 (age 23)
- Party: Social Democratic Party

Amelie Muthsam (born 16 November 2002) is an Austrian politician serving as a member of the Federal Council since 2025. She has served as chairwoman of the Socialist Youth in Lower Austria since 2023.
