= Paul Stich =

Austrian politician (born 1998)

Chair of the Socialist Youth Austria
- In office 22 February 2020 – 22 February 2025
- Preceded by: Julia Herr
- Succeeded by: Larissa Zivkovic

Personal details
- Born: 23 February 1998 (age 27)
- Political party: Social Democratic Party
- Website: Official website

Paul Stich (born 23 February 1998) is an Austrian politician of the Social Democratic Party of Austria (SPÖ). He served as the Chairperson of the Socialist Youth Austria (SJÖ) from February 22, 2020, to February 22, 2025.

== Early life ==
Paul Stich grew up in Vienna’s 21st district, Floridsdorf, and attended the Schoolboat (Bertha-von-Suttner-Gymnasium). After graduating, he worked as a museum guide at the Washhouse in the Karl-Marx-Hof. In addition, he was employed at the SOS Children's Village and later worked in the office of the SJ Vienna.

== Political career ==
In 2015, at the age of 17, Paul Stich joined the SJ in the Floridsdorf district group. In various interviews, he stated that the reason for his membership was the refugee crisis in 2015. He quickly progressed from the district level to the federal level. Julia Herr brought him into the federal office. When Julia Herr entered the National Council in October 2019, she chose not to run again, paving the way for Paul Stich. At the association meeting of the SJÖ on February 22, 2020, he was elected with 87,64 percent of the votes. There were no opposing candidates. At the 39th association meeting of the SJÖ in 2022, he was elected with 84.39 percent, and finally at the 40th association meeting on February 17, 2024, he was re-elected with 85,54 percent for a third term. In the Vienna City Council election in 2020, Paul Stich ran for the SPÖ Floridsdorf and has since been the Youth District Councilor of Floridsdorf. Paul Stich ran for the SPÖ in the EU elections on position 42 on the list. Stich ran as a candidate in the 2024 legislative election, occupying the 9th position on the federal list. He was elected and sworn in as a Member of the National Council on October 24, 2024, for the 28th legislative period. In doing so, he is the youngest Member of Parliament of the SPÖ.

== Political Positions ==
=== Citizenship and Integration ===
Stich advocates for automatically granting Austrian citizenship to children born in Austria. During his tenure, the Socialist Youth, under his leadership, successfully influenced a change in position within the SPÖ. Stich sees this as a democratic necessity and a building block for successful integration. According to him, a modernized citizenship law would also make the activities of radically religious associations or politicians like Turkish President Recep Tayyip Erdoğan more challenging.

=== Economy and Society ===
Paul Stich is associated with the left-wing faction of the SPÖ primarily due to his strong stance on redistribution. After his election, he advocated for a radical redesign of the tax system in Austria. Stich supports, among other things, a wealth tax of up to 80 percent for billionaires. He emphasizes the goal of returning a fair share of societal prosperity to the working people.

=== Education ===
Stich emphasizes the need for a comprehensive overhaul of the education system. In this context, he advocates for the abolition of the existing Matura (final examination) and its replacement with project work. At the 2021 Federal Party Congress, he succeeded in anchoring this position within the SPÖ.

=== SPÖ Member Survey 2023 ===
In the Kronen Zeitung, SJ Chairman Paul Stich made a corresponding party election recommendation for Andreas Babler (SPÖ). Acting as a representative of the party's youth, he stated that he sees the Traiskirchen mayor as having the greatest potential for a "sense of renewal within the party" and majorities in favor of the SPÖ. Daniel, Isabelle. "Isabelle Daniel: Das Interview mit Paul Stich" (Interview). oe24.
