= Julia Herr =

Austrian politician (born 1992)

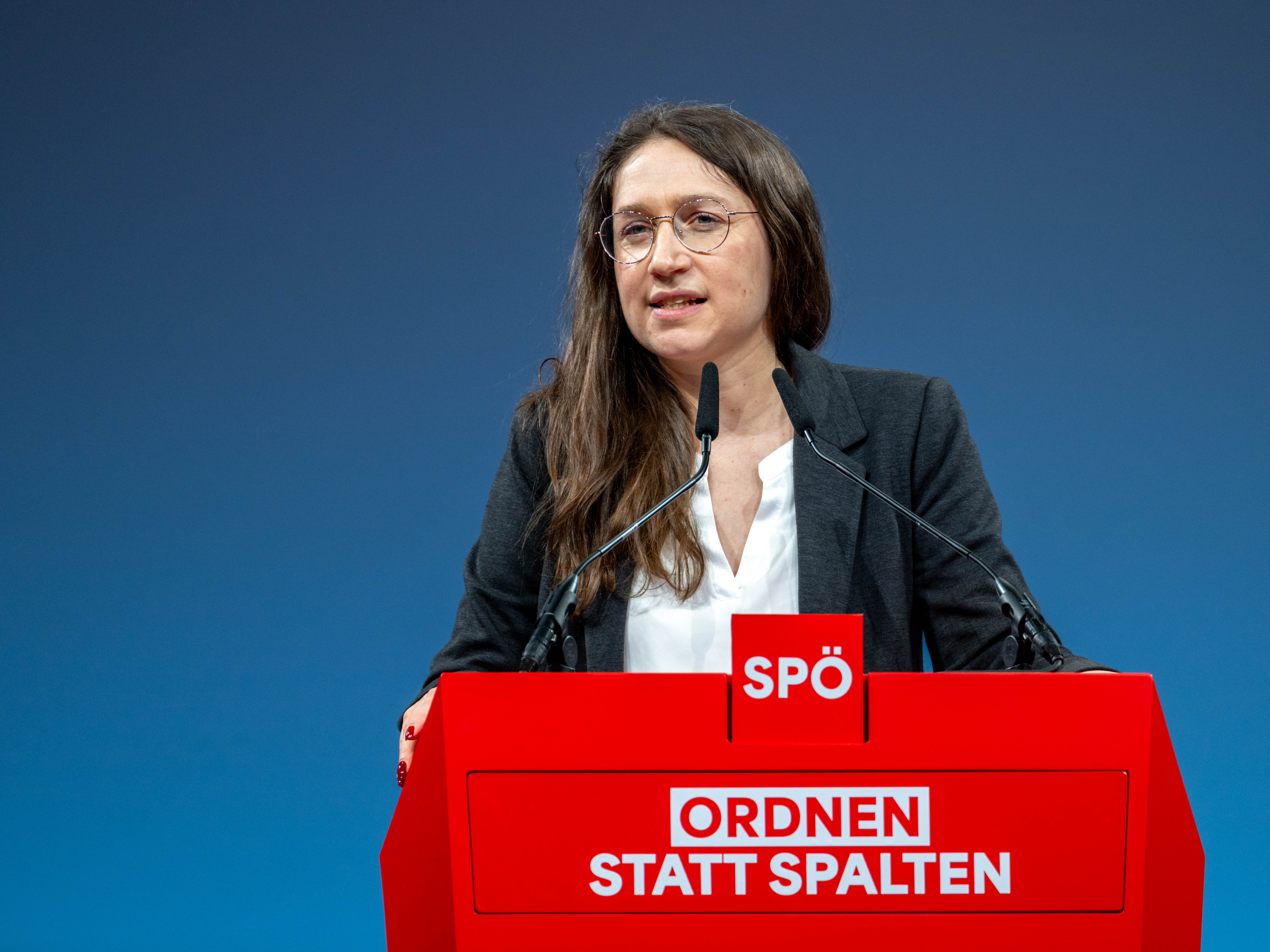
- Julia Herr in 2026

Chair of the Socialist Youth Austria
- In office 3 May 2014 – 22 February 2020
- Preceded by: Wolfgang Moitzi
- Succeeded by: Paul Stich

Personal details
- Born: 28 November 1992 (age 33)
- Party: Social Democratic Party
- Website: Official website

Julia Elisabeth Herr (born 28 November 1992, in Sigleß, Burgenland) is an Austrian politician affiliated with the Social Democratic Party of Austria (SPÖ). From 2014 to 2020, she served as the Chairperson of the Socialist Youth Austria (SJÖ) and became the first woman to lead the organization. Between 2016 and 2018, she held the position of Chairperson of the Federal Youth Representation (Bundesjugendvertretung). In May 2019, she was listed as the sixth candidate on the SPÖ slate for the European Parliament election. Julia Herr has been a Member of the Austrian National Council since October 2019.

== Early life and political career ==
Julia Herr graduated from the Gymnasium BRG Hochstraße in Mattersburg. She is currently studying sociology at the University of Vienna. In the Socialist Youth of Austria, she began her involvement in Pöttsching and worked in the Woman* Political Commission (FPK) for the SJ Burgenland. From 2011, she was active as the women's affairs officer nationwide.

=== Chair of Socialist Youth Austria ===
At the 35th Congress of Socialist Youth of Austria in May 2014 in Graz, Julia Herr narrowly won with 54 percent against Fiona Kaiser from Upper Austria and, at the age of 21, became the youngest chair and the first woman in history to lead the SJÖ. Herr highlighted a credibility issue within the SPÖ and advocated for an exit from the coalition with the ÖVP in cases of inadequate enforcement. Her election program called for a democratic, Marxist, and feminist orientation of the SJÖ. She advocated for the nationalization of all banks and key industries.

Julia Herr gained significant media attention in 2015 through a YouTube video showing her being removed from the stage by the Minister of Education and Minister of Women, Gabriele Heinisch-Hosek, during the SPÖ Federal Party Congress in March 2014.

At the 36th Regular Congress of the Socialist Youth of Austria on March 12 and 13, 2016, in St. Pölten, she was re-elected with 82.72 percent of the vote.

At the 37th Regular Congress of the Socialist Youth of Austria on April 14 and 15, 2018, Herr was re-elected for her third term as chair with her best result yet, receiving 87.07 percent of the vote.

In February 2020 she was succeeded by Paul Stich as chair of the SJÖ.

=== Federal Youth Representation ===
In 2016, Herr became the chair of the Federal Youth Representation (Bundesjugendvertretung), where combating youth unemployment and poverty were significant concerns. Between 2014 and 2016, she was already the spokesperson for the Women's Political Committee of the Federal Youth Representation.

At the General Assembly of the Federal Youth Representation on March 22, 2018, Caroline Pavitsits was elected as Julia Herr's successor as chair of the Federal Youth Representation.

=== 2017 National Council election ===
On July 21, 2017 Julia Herr announced her candidacy for a seat in the National Council of the SPÖ in the 2017 National Council election. She ran on the 16th list position and campaigned for preferential votes.

In her campaign she emphasized the need to address "the actual concerns of young people, which revolve more around apprenticeships, jobs, and affordable housing." She proposed financing these initiatives by requiring "banks and corporations to contribute".

She received 2607 preferential votes. Although only the former Chancellor Christian Kern (67,227) and former Minister Pamela Rendi-Wagner (2709) received more votes from those ranked ahead of her, she narrowly missed entering the National Council.

=== 2019 European Parliament election ===
On October 18, 2018, the SPÖ announced that Julia Herr would run as the 6th candidate for the European Parliament election on May 26, 2019. Julia Herr received 19,416 preferential votes, the second highest among all SPÖ candidates and the sixth highest overall.

=== 2019 National Council election ===
On July 10, 2019, it was announced that Julia Herr would run on the 7th list position of the SPÖ federal list.

Herr was also the lead candidate in Penzing in 2019 and the second candidate on the regional list for electoral district Vienna South-West. In her presentation, her central statements were: "I am running and fighting to ensure that the interests of the people in the country are worth more than the profit interests of a few. Apartments are for living, not for speculation. We must stop the transformation of our state into a self-service shop for millionaires. Politics must not be for sale, and elections must not be decided by donations from corporate chiefs worth millions. Clear limits are needed here for donations and campaign budgets".

== Political positions ==
=== Society ===
Julia Herr organized a "Beer-for-Marriage-Equality" demonstration for the opening of marriage for homosexuals in front of the ÖVP headquarters. In 2016, she supported the concerns of numerous volunteer organizations and participated in the cross party press conference of the Save the Association Festivals (RDV) initiative, advocating for more association friendly regulations. In 2017, she advocated for a nationwide uniform youth protection law and a smoking ban in restaurants. Herr supports the legalization of cannabis for recreational use.

In response to the successful performance of the Austrian women's national football team at the 2017 UEFA Women's Euro, Julia Herr advocated for increased support for professional and school based women's football in Austria.

In a publication on a party website, Julia Herr positioned herself against a ban on headscarves, stating that it restricts the freedom of choice of those affected and that gender pay gaps constitute a more severe form of discrimination against women. In her speech, she emphasized that "currently, with incitement against immigrants, against refugees or against Islam, elections are won, but social cutbacks affect migrants, as well as the unemployed and low wage workers. In the end, only the rich and corporations benefit".

=== Economy ===
In 2014 Herr called for the nationalization of all banks and key industries, citing Venezuela as a model. In 2018, Herr reiterated this demand, expressing her support for the call made by German SPD official Kevin Kühnert for the nationalization of parts of the real estate market, but she clarified that her model "is not the GDR".

She strongly opposes the free trade agreements CETA and TTIP and advocates for an increase in the minimum wage. Herr supported the SPÖ's demand for a Green New Deal before the 2019 EU elections.

=== Structure and orientation of the SPÖ ===
Within the SPÖ, Herr advocates for the enforcement of the women's quota. In 2018, she criticized the fact that the "historic task of overcoming capitalism" was not reflected in the new party program of the SPÖ.

=== Russo-Ukrainian War ===
In 2014 Herr stated in a press release: "Since the EU-supported coup, it seems that there is a free hand for armed fascist gangs in Ukraine. When will the non-democratically legitimate government in Kiev finally be stopped?" She called on the government not to "jump on a one-sided Russia-hostile course according to the taste of NATO, EU, and US," stating that a "Russia-hostile course (...) is a disgrace for a neutral country like Austria".

== Awards ==
- Leading Ladies Award 2014
