= Andreas Kühberger =

Austrian politician (born 1974)

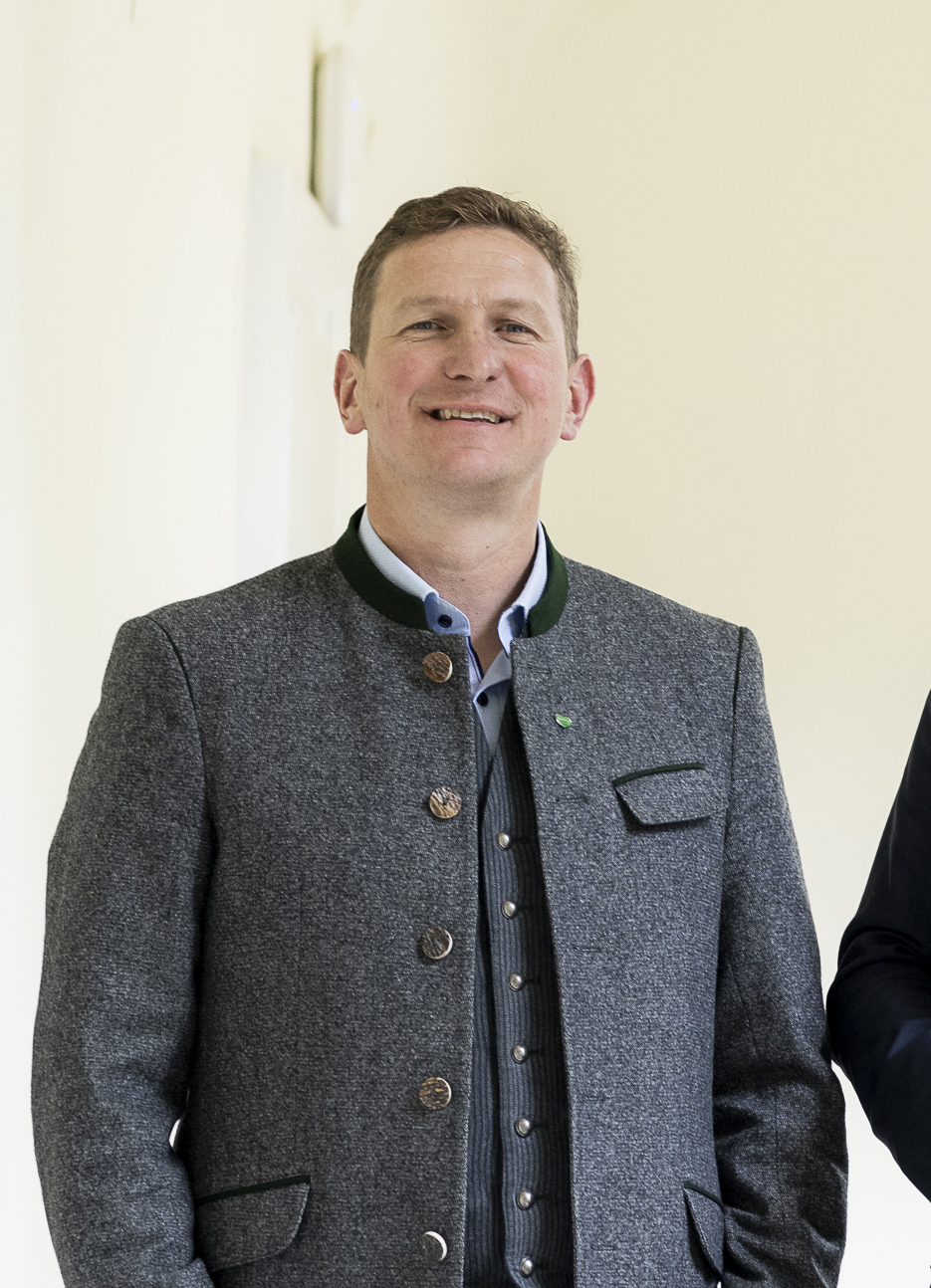
- Kühberger in 2022

Member of the National Council
- Incumbent
- Assumed office 9 November 2017
- Constituency: Upper Styria

Personal details
- Born: 24 April 1974 (age 51)
- Party: People's Party

Andreas Kühberger (born 24 April 1974) is an Austrian politician of the People's Party serving as a member of the National Council since 2017. He has served as mayor of Mautern in Steiermark since 2010.
