= Nittel (surname) =

Nittel is a surname of German origin. Notable people with the surname Nittel include:

- Ahren Nittel (born 1983), ice hockey player
- Heinz Nittel (1931–1981), politician
