= Wolfgang Zanger =

Austrian politician (born 1968)

Member of the National Council
- Incumbent
- Assumed office 30 October 2006
- Constituency: Upper Styria

Personal details
- Born: 4 December 1968 (age 57)
- Party: Freedom Party of Austria

Wolfgang Zanger (born 4 December 1968) is an Austrian politician who has been a Member of the National Council for the Freedom Party of Austria (FPÖ) from 2006 to 2019.
