= Corinna Scharzenberger =

Austrian politician (born 1990)

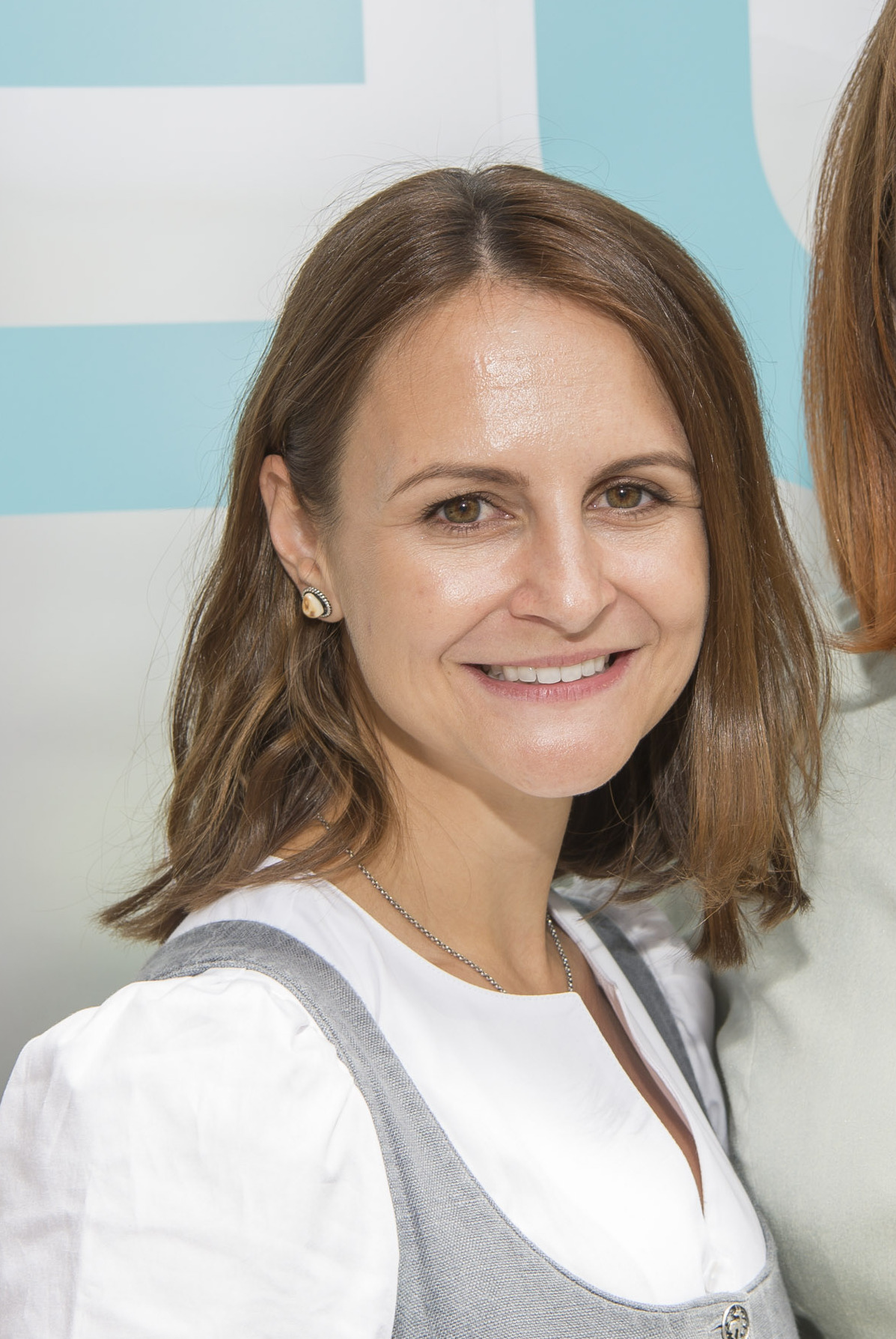
- Scharzenberger in 2019

Member of the National Council
- Incumbent
- Assumed office 23 October 2019
- Constituency: Upper Styria

Personal details
- Born: 24 June 1990 (age 35)
- Party: Austrian People's Party

Corinna Scharzenberger (born 24 June 1990) is an Austrian politician of the Austrian People's Party. Since 2019, she has been a member of the National Council. In the 2019 European Parliament election, she was a candidate for member of the European Parliament.
