= Upper Styria (National Council electoral district) =

Parliamentary electoral district in Austria

- Obersteiermark
- Electoral District for the National Council
- Location of Upper Styria within Austria
- District: List: Bruck-Mürzzuschlag; Leoben; Liezen; Murau; Murtal
- State: Styria
- Population: 335,577 (2024)
- Electorate: 271,302 (2019)
- Area: 9,560 km^{2} (2023)

Current Electoral District
- Created: 2013
- Seats: List: 7 (2024–present); 8 (2013–2024)
- Members: List: Andreas Kühberger (ÖVP); Max Lercher (SPÖ); Corinna Scharzenberger (ÖVP); Wolfgang Zanger (FPÖ)
- Created from: List: Styria North; Styria North West; Styria West

Upper Styria (German: Obersteiermark), also known as Electoral District 6D (German: Wahlkreis 6D), is one of the 39 multi-member regional electoral districts of the National Council, the lower house of the Austrian Parliament, the national legislature of Austria. The electoral district was established in 2012 by the merger of Styria North, Styria North West and Styria West following the re-organisation of the regional electoral districts in Styria to reflect the new administrative district structure and came into being at the following legislative election in 2013. It consists of the districts of Bruck-Mürzzuschlag, Leoben, Liezen, Murau and Murtal in the state of Styria. The electoral district currently elects seven of the 183 members of the National Council using the open party-list proportional representation electoral system. At the 2019 legislative election the constituency had 271,302 registered electors.

== History ==
Upper Styria was established in 2012 by the merger of Styria North, Styria North West and Styria West following the re-organisation of the regional electoral districts in Styria to reflect the new administrative district structure. It consisted of the districts of Bruck-Mürzzuschlag, Leoben, Liezen, Murau and Murtal in the state of Styria. The district was initially allocated nine seats in April 2013. Electoral regulations require the allocation of seats amongst the electoral districts to be recalculated following each national census and in June 2013 the number of seats allocated to Upper Styria was reduced to eight based on the population as at the 2011 national census. The number of seats allocated to Upper Styria was reduced to seven in June 2023 based on the population as at the 2021 national census.

== Electoral system ==
Upper Styria currently elects seven of the 183 members of the National Council using the open party-list proportional representation electoral system. The allocation of seats is carried out in three stages. In the first stage, seats are allocated to parties (lists) at the regional level using a state-wide Hare quota (wahlzahl) (valid votes in the state divided by the number of seats in the state). In the second stage, seats are allocated to parties at the state/provincial level using the state-wide Hare quota (any seats won by the party at the regional stage are subtracted from the party's state seats). In the third and final stage, seats are allocated to parties at the federal/national level using the D'Hondt method (any seats won by the party at the regional and state stages are subtracted from the party's federal seats). Only parties that reach the 4% national threshold, or have won a seat at the regional stage, compete for seats at the state and federal stages.

Electors may cast one preferential vote for individual candidates at the regional, state and federal levels. Split-ticket voting (panachage), or voting for more than one candidate at each level, is not permitted and will result in the ballot paper being invalidated. At the regional level, candidates must receive preferential votes amounting to at least 14% of the valid votes cast for their party to over-ride the order of the party list (10% and 7% respectively for the state and federal levels).

== Election results ==
=== Summary ===
Election	Communists KPÖ+ / KPÖ			Social Democrats SPÖ			Greens GRÜNE			NEOS NEOS			People's ÖVP			Freedom FPÖ		
Election	Votes	%	Seats	Votes	%	Seats	Votes	%	Seats	Votes	%	Seats	Votes	%	Seats	Votes	%	Seats
2019	2,682	1.35%	0	52,829	26.61%	1	16,347	8.23%	0	12,117	6.10%	0	74,417	37.48%	2	36,172	18.22%	1
2017	1,921	0.88%	0	67,661	31.16%	2	3,547	1.63%	0	7,869	3.62%	0	61,479	28.31%	2	64,861	29.87%	2
2013	4,271	2.01%	0	67,380	31.71%	2	15,892	7.48%	0	6,530	3.07%	0	37,783	17.78%	1	52,789	24.84%	1

=== Detailed ===
==== 2019 ====
Results of the 2019 legislative election held on 29 September 2019:

Party		Votes per district						Total votes	%	Seats
Party		Bruck- Mürzzu- schlag	Leoben	Liezen	Murau	Murtal	Voting card	Total votes	%	Seats
Austrian People's Party	ÖVP	19,627	11,456	18,786	8,582	15,735	231	74,417	37.48%	2
Social Democratic Party of Austria	SPÖ	17,458	10,143	9,921	3,434	11,767	106	52,829	26.61%	1
Freedom Party of Austria	FPÖ	10,525	6,487	8,073	3,231	7,762	94	36,172	18.22%	1
The Greens – The Green Alternative	GRÜNE	4,937	2,927	4,084	1,122	3,084	193	16,347	8.23%	0
NEOS – The New Austria and Liberal Forum	NEOS	3,318	2,250	3,131	974	2,322	122	12,117	6.10%	0
JETZT	JETZT	1,083	638	661	185	667	23	3,257	1.64%	0
KPÖ Plus	KPÖ+	841	672	468	82	613	6	2,682	1.35%	0
Der Wandel	WANDL	240	139	172	42	121	4	718	0.36%	0
Valid Votes		58,029	34,712	45,296	17,652	42,071	779	198,539	100.00%	4
Rejected Votes		676	337	523	216	408	7	2,167	1.08%	
Total Polled		58,705	35,049	45,819	17,868	42,479	786	200,706	73.98%	
Registered Electors		79,291	48,192	62,618	23,117	58,084		271,302		
Turnout		74.04%	72.73%	73.17%	77.29%	73.13%		73.98%		

The following candidates were elected:

- Party mandates - Hannes Amesbauer (FPÖ), 4,099 votes; Andreas Kühberger (ÖVP), 5,767 votes; Max Lercher (SPÖ), 7,354 votes; and Corinna Scharzenberger (ÖVP), 2,521 votes.

Substitutions:

- Hannes Amesbauer (FPÖ) was reassigned to the federal list seat vacated by Petra Steger and was replaced by Wolfgang Zanger (FPÖ) in Upper Styria on 16 July 2024.

==== 2017 ====
Results of the 2017 legislative election held on 15 October 2017:

Party		Votes per district						Total votes	%	Seats
Party		Bruck- Mürzzu- schlag	Leoben	Liezen	Murau	Murtal	Voting card	Total votes	%	Seats
Social Democratic Party of Austria	SPÖ	21,694	12,964	13,409	4,120	15,247	227	67,661	31.16%	2
Freedom Party of Austria	FPÖ	19,008	12,016	14,100	5,754	13,798	185	64,861	29.87%	2
Austrian People's Party	ÖVP	15,387	9,066	16,520	7,341	12,879	286	61,479	28.31%	2
NEOS – The New Austria and Liberal Forum	NEOS	2,123	1,522	1,989	675	1,450	110	7,869	3.62%	0
Peter Pilz List	PILZ	2,587	1,386	1,443	388	1,301	73	7,178	3.31%	0
The Greens – The Green Alternative	GRÜNE	1,028	626	943	263	642	45	3,547	1.63%	0
Communist Party of Austria	KPÖ	623	522	236	62	460	18	1,921	0.88%	0
My Vote Counts!	GILT	554	341	409	84	319	16	1,723	0.79%	0
Free List Austria	FLÖ	149	79	128	73	122	3	554	0.26%	0
The Whites	WEIßE	93	53	90	22	74	3	335	0.15%	0
Valid Votes		63,246	38,575	49,267	18,782	46,292	966	217,128	100.00%	6
Rejected Votes		517	272	457	146	351	5	1,748	0.80%	
Total Polled		63,763	38,847	49,724	18,928	46,643	971	218,876	79.56%	
Registered Electors		80,422	49,246	63,299	23,425	58,729		275,121		
Turnout		79.29%	78.88%	78.55%	80.80%	79.42%		79.56%		

The following candidates were elected:

- Party mandates - Hannes Amesbauer (FPÖ), 3,850 votes; Barbara Krenn (ÖVP), 6,709 votes; Andreas Kühberger (ÖVP), 6,456 votes; Jörg Leichtfried (SPÖ), 7,078 votes; Birgit Sandler (SPÖ), 548 votes; and Wolfgang Zanger (FPÖ), 3,411 votes.

Substitutions:

- Barbara Krenn (ÖVP) died on 3 April 2019 and was replaced by Karl Schmidhofer (ÖVP) on 10 April 2019.

==== 2013 ====
Results of the 2013 legislative election held on 29 September 2013:

Party		Votes per district						Total votes	%	Seats
Party		Bruck- Mürzzu- schlag	Leoben	Liezen	Murau	Murtal	Voting card	Total votes	%	Seats
Social Democratic Party of Austria	SPÖ	22,042	13,703	12,874	4,195	14,412	154	67,380	31.71%	2
Freedom Party of Austria	FPÖ	15,677	10,113	11,083	4,543	11,259	114	52,789	24.84%	1
Austrian People's Party	ÖVP	9,184	4,889	10,165	5,177	8,195	173	37,783	17.78%	1
Team Stronach	FRANK	4,914	2,958	3,964	1,607	3,957	58	17,458	8.22%	0
The Greens – The Green Alternative	GRÜNE	4,626	2,688	4,110	1,235	3,084	149	15,892	7.48%	0
Alliance for the Future of Austria	BZÖ	2,041	1,366	1,942	1,313	2,120	39	8,821	4.15%	0
NEOS – The New Austria	NEOS	1,855	1,218	1,715	489	1,192	61	6,530	3.07%	0
Communist Party of Austria	KPÖ	1,325	1,232	512	120	1,067	15	4,271	2.01%	0
Pirate Party of Austria	PIRAT	303	208	305	81	224	5	1,126	0.53%	0
Christian Party of Austria	CPÖ	137	58	149	35	75	1	455	0.21%	0
Valid Votes		62,104	38,433	46,819	18,795	45,585	769	212,505	100.00%	4
Rejected Votes		911	385	975	272	563	8	3,114	1.44%	
Total Polled		63,015	38,818	47,794	19,067	46,148	777	215,619	76.36%	
Registered Electors		83,167	51,528	63,400	24,103	60,190		282,388		
Turnout		75.77%	75.33%	75.38%	79.11%	76.67%		76.36%		

The following candidates were elected:

- Party mandates - Andrea Gessl-Ranftl (SPÖ), 2,057 votes; Fritz Grillitsch (ÖVP), 5,096 votes; Erwin Spindelberger (SPÖ), 3,859 votes; and Wolfgang Zanger (FPÖ), 2,906 votes.
