= 1981 Vienna synagogue attack =

Armed terrorist attacks in Vienna, Austria

- Location: 48°12′38″N 16°22′37″E; Innere Stadt, Vienna, Austria
- Date: 29 August 1981; 20:00 (UTC+01:00)
- Target: Civilians
- Attack type: Mass shooting, grenade attack
- Weapons: WZ-63 submachine gun; grenades
- Deaths: 2
- Injuries: 18
- Perpetrators: Marwan Hasan and Hesham Mohammed Rajeh
- Motive: Palestinian nationalism

The 1981 Vienna synagogue attack was a terror attack that occurred 29 August 1981. The incident took place in the Stadttempel of Vienna, Austria carried out by two terrorists of the Abu Nidal Organization.

== Attack ==
The mass shooting and grenade attack killed two people and wounded 18 others attending a Bar mitzvah service at the Stadttempel in Vienna on 29 August 1981. Two terrorists entered the 155-year-old Israelite Temple in the central Vienna area of Seitenstettengasse, posing as Jews. The terrorists then came into a fire exchange with the two already wounded policemen.

A bodyguard of a local Jewish business owner arrived quickly at the synagogue and pointed his gun directly at one of the perpetrators, shooting him and subdued the other. Police cordoned off the entire area and began a house to house search for possible accomplices and hidden bombs.

According to early reports, three terrorists had been involved in the attack. The Austrian police later said this was not correct and that the only two who had stormed the synagogue were involved. The police were detaining a third person who was arrested in a Vienna apartment shortly after the attack, but no details were available regarding the suspect. Two civilians, a 25-year-old woman and a 68-year-old man were shot and killed in the attack, and several others were critically wounded, amongst two of the policemen.

In connection with the attack, the two Palestinian assailants, Marwan Hasan, 25 years old, of Jordan, and Hesham Mohammed Rajeh, 21, born in Iraq, were convicted of terrorist charges and attempted murder. Rajeh was also indicted for the 1 May murder of Heinz Nittel, head of the Austrian-Israel Society. Both men received life sentences.
