= Peter Strasser (politician) =

Austrian politician (1917 – 1962)

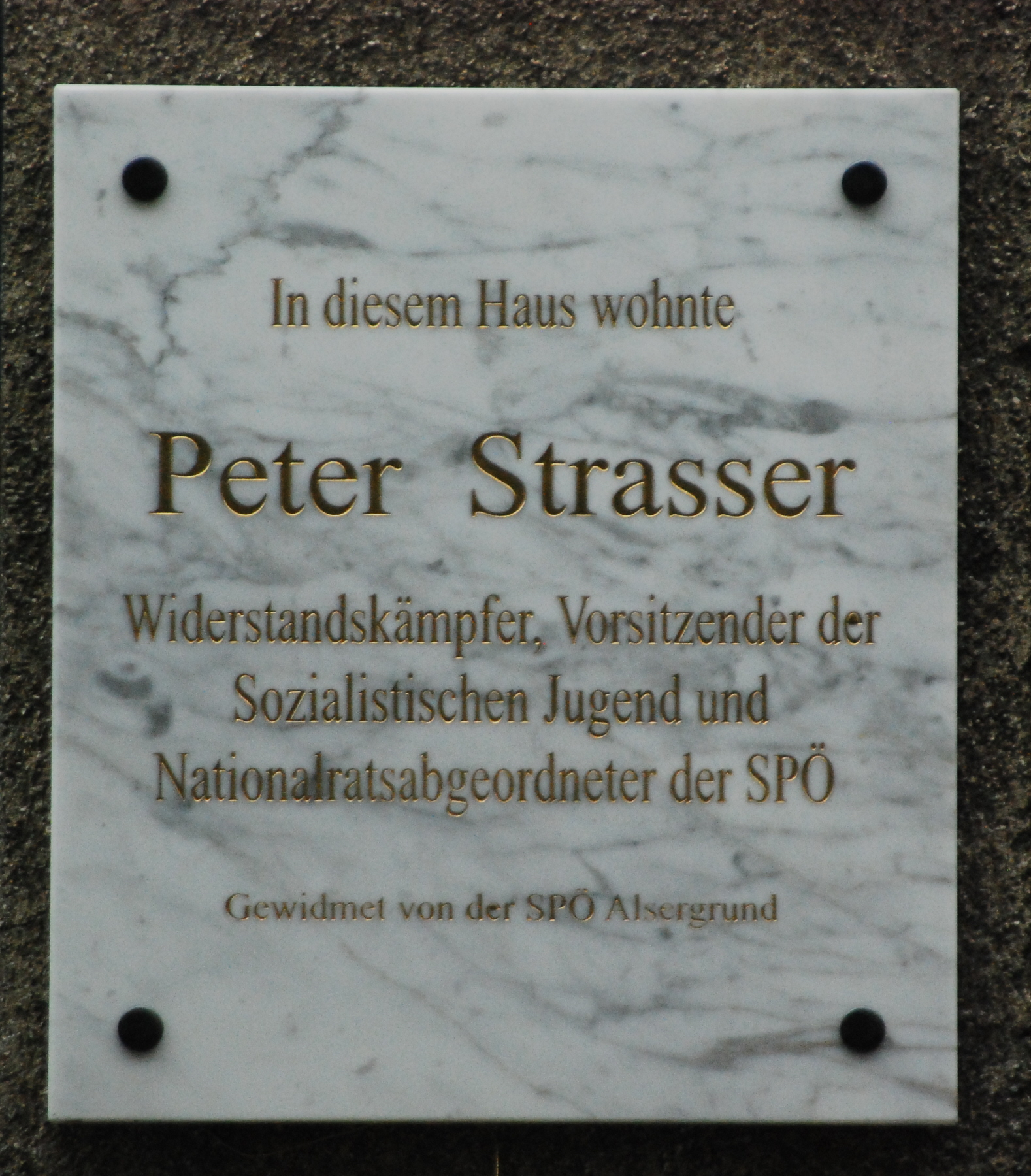
The memorial plaque for Peter Strasser was ceremonially unveiled on July 3, 2012 at the house in Vienna

Peter Strasser (3 July 1917 – 6 June 1962) was an Austrian politician of the Socialist Party of Austria (SPÖ) and Chairman of the Socialist Youth Austria (SJÖ).

== Early life and political career ==
Peter Strasser was born in Jena on 3 July 1917. Josef Strasser, Peter's father, was a leading functionary of the Social Democratic movement in Reichenberg, Bohemia, before World War I, then part of Austria-Hungary. His mother, Isa Strasser, despite coming from the Prussian nobility, was a committed leftist. Peter's parents later moved to Vienna and joined the Communist Party of Austria (KPÖ).

At the age of twelve, Peter Strasser became a member of the Socialist Worker Youth (SAJ) and assumed important tasks in the then-illegal Revolutionary Socialist Youth (RSJ) from 1934, during the time of the dictatorial "Ständestaat". During this period, he met Josef Hindels, who was active in union youth work.

In 1938, after the Anschluss auf Austria, Strasser fled with his wife Jenny from Austria to France, where he was detained by the police for ten months. After the Nazi occupation of France, he lived underground and collaborated with the Resistance, but was arrested and handed over to the Gestapo. After a brief stay in a concentration camp, the regime forced Strasser to work as a welder in a German armaments factory. Strasser avoided military service by feigning illness.

On April 27, 1945, Austrian politicians declared the rebirth of the republic. The next day, supporters of the SPÖ under Strasser's chairmanship in the Vienna City Hall decided to found a socialist youth organization; the proposal by the Communists to do this jointly with them was not followed. In 1946, the Socialist Youth Austria (SJÖ) was refounded, of which Peter Strasser was chairman until 1954.

In 1948, he was elected chairman of the International Union of Socialist Youth (IUSY). In 1949, he became the youngest member of the National Council. In 1960, he also took over the function of chairman of the SPÖ Alsergrund.

He died from cancer in Vienna on 6 June 1962. After Strasser's death, a large cooperative building at the end of Landstraßer Hauptstraße in the 3rd Vienna district was named Peter-Strasser-Hof. On 3 July 2012, a plaque was unveiled at his former residence at Meynertgasse 3 in Vienna's Alsergrund district. In Strasshof an der Nordbahn, the Peter Strasser-Gasse was named after him.

His urn grave is located in the urn grove of the Feuerhalle Simmering. It is one of the graves of honor dedicated or taken care of by the City of Vienna.

== See also ==
- List of members of the Austrian Parliament who died in office

== Literature ==
- Ein Atemzug Freiheit – Volksaufstand und Konterrevolution in Ungarn (1957), published by the Wiener Volksbuchhandlung.
- Gefährliche Kraft. Fakten und Folgen der Motorisierung (1960), published by the Austrian Trade Union Federation.
- Sozialistische Initiative – Reden und Aufsätze (1963), published by Europa Verlag.
- Strasser, Peter, in: Werner Röder, Herbert A. Strauss (Eds.): Biographisches Handbuch der deutschsprachigen Emigration nach 1933. Band 1: Politik, Wirtschaft, Öffentliches Leben. Munich: Saur 1980, pp. 742f.
