= Socialist Youth Austria =

Austrian youth organisation

Socialist Youth Austria Sozialistische Jugend Österreich (SJÖ)
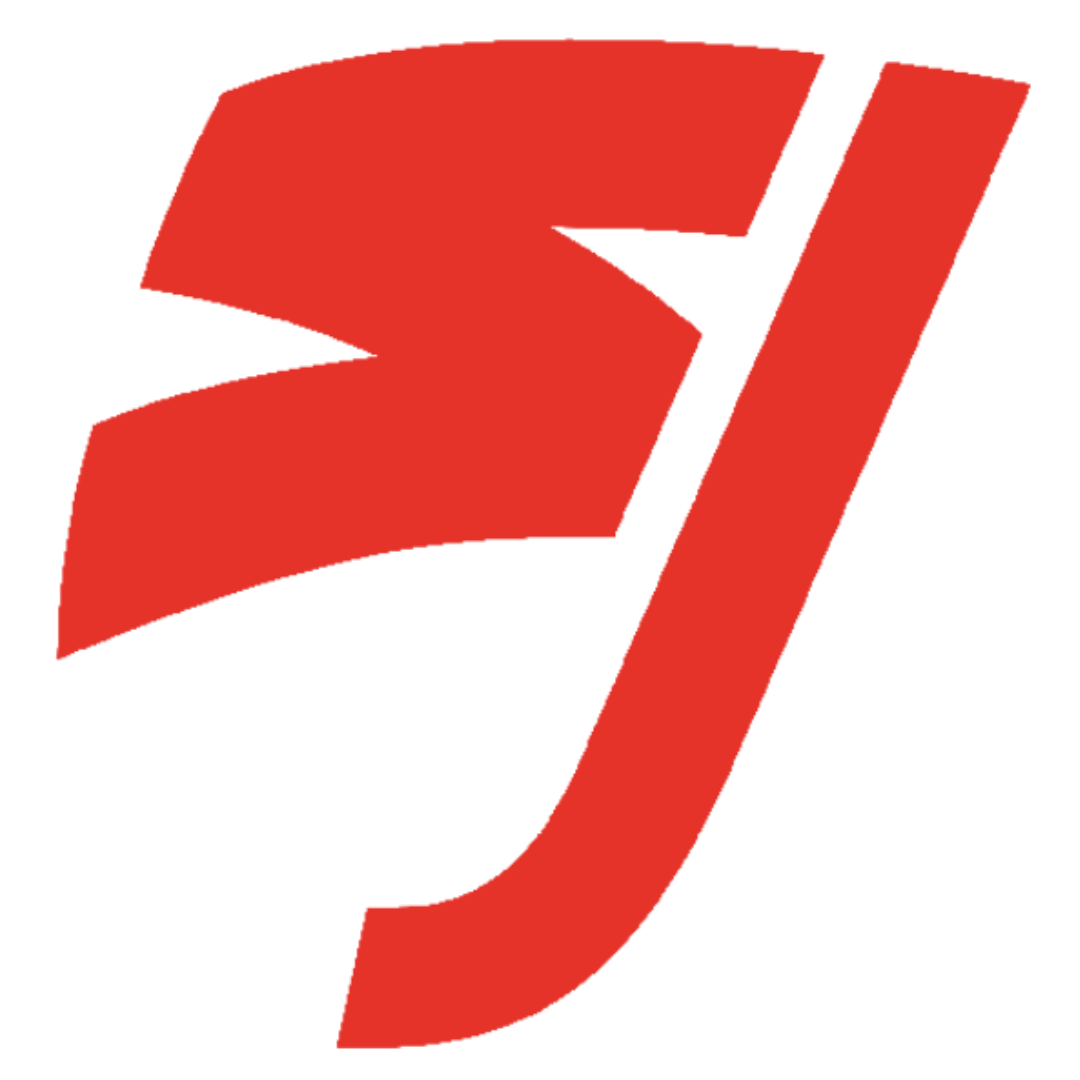
- Chairperson: Larissa Zivkovic
- Spokesperson: Jakob Rennhofer
- Founded: 4 November 1894; 131 years ago
- Headquarters: Amtshausgasse 4, A-1050; Vienna, Austria
- Ideology: Democratic socialism Marxism; Antimilitarism; Antifascism; Anti-capitalism; Feminism; Internationalism
- Colours: Red; White
- International affiliation: International Union of Socialist Youth (IUSY)
- European affiliation: Young European Socialists (YES)
- Newspaper: trotzdem.at
- Website: sjoe.at

The Socialist Youth Austria (German: Sozialistische Jugend Österreich, SJÖ, also SJ) is the largest socialist youth organisation in Austria. Founded in 1894 as a club for apprentice protection, it was initially called Association of Young Workers (German: Verein Jugendlicher Arbeiter, VJA). Although not part of the Social Democratic Party of Austria (SPÖ), there is a close relationship between the two organisations. The SJÖ is actively integrated within the committees of the SPÖ.

The program of the organisation adopted in 2004 is based on scientific socialism and Marxism, which positions it more to the left than the social democratic SPÖ.

The SJÖ is member of the Young European Socialists (YES; formerly ECOSY) and the International Union of Socialist Youth (IUSY), which has its headquarters in the same building as the SJÖ.

== Structure ==
The Socialist Youth is present in all nine federal states through state organizations, which are further subdivided into local and district groups. Their political activities include educational work, such as group meetings of district and local groups, as well as political seminars across Austria, like BIWE, ANTIFA, and FEMSEM. Additionally, some states have their own statespecific seminars, like the Viennese SOWE and Marxseminar. Moreover, they engage in political activism. During elections, the Socialist Youth frequently puts forth its own candidates and actively gathers preferential votes for them. Since the National Council election in 2019, the Socialist Youth has been represented by its former chairwoman, Julia Herr.

Not all state organizations adopt the name "Sozialistische Jugend". The Salzburg state organization is known as "Junge SozialistInnen", abbreviated as "Jusos", while the Carinthia state organization is identified as "SJG – Die junge Sozialdemokratie." The term "SJG" originated from the amalgamation of "Sozialistische Jugend (SJ)" and "Junge Generation (JG)" (the SPÖ youth equivalent of the SJÖ) in Carinthia. Likewise, the state organizations in Tyrol and Salzburg result from the merging of SJ and JG. A parallel scenario occurred in Burgenland from 1995 to 2002 when, driven by the SPÖ, SJ and JG merged into "Juso Burgenland" ("Junge Sozialdemokratie"). Since 2002, the state organization has reverted to SJ Burgenland, and the Burgenland JG no longer exists. In Styria, the transition from "Jusos" to "Sozialistische Jugend Steiermark" occurred during the 2005 state conference, while in Tyrol, the change was finalized during the 2013 state conference.

Chairpersons of all nine federal state organizations:

- Vienna: Lena Stern
- Lower Austria: Amelie Muthsam
- Upper Austria: Eva Reiter
- Tyrol: Nick Grüner
- Styria: Jonathan Kaspar
- Salzburg (Jusos): Lena Wimmreuter
- Carinthia (SJG): Luca Burgstaller
- Burgenland: Vanessa Wiener
- Vorarlberg: Currently no Chairperson (formerly Sonja Kopf)

=== Frauen*politische Kommission ===
The Frauen*politische Kommission (FPK) (English: Woman* Political Commission) operates as a distinct part within the organization, allowing all women* (or FLINTA* people) to organize within the Socialist Youth. It partially uses gender sensitive and inclusive spelling, such as FLINTA*. The FPK organizes various activities, including women* political campaigns, separate seminars like the FEMSEM, engages with political issues, and has the ability to submit proposals at regional conferences or at the association's congress. The current FPK Spokesperson for the Socialist Youth is Fiona Schindl.

=== Other structures ===
Additionally, the Socialist Youth founded a student organization in 1976 called the Aktion kritischer Schüler innen (AKS) (English: Action of Critical Students). The AKS now operates independently but in close cooperation with the SJ. The Socialist Youth runs its own publishing house, the "Trotzdem-Verlag", where, since 1948, the central organ of the SJ, the newspaper "Trotzdem", has been published. In addition to the publications of the federal organization, each regional organization also releases its own print media. For example, SJ Lower Austria publishes "Direkt", SJ Burgenland has "Signale", SJ Upper Austria has "Extradienst", Salzburg JUSOS publishes "Rotschrift", and SJ Vienna releases "Faktor". Apart from the "Trotzdem-Verlag", SJ and SJ Upper Austria also own the "Europacamp" In Weißenbach am Attersee in Upper Austria, a venue where seminars, of which the longest lasts for 4 days, are conducted. Additionally, regular camping and youth hostel activities take place at this location.

=== Viennese structure ===
The SJ is represented in 17 of the 23 Viennese districts. These are:

- SJ2 (Leopoldstadt)
- SJ3 (Landstraße)
- SJ4 (Wieden)
- SJ5 (Margareten)
- SJ6 (Mariahilf)
- SJ7 (Neubau)
- SJ8 (Josefstadt)
- SJ10 (Favoriten)
- SJ11 (Simmering)
- SJ12 (Meidling)
- SJ13 (Hietzing)
- SJ16 (Ottakring)
- SJ17 (Hernals)
- SJ20 (Brigittenau)
- SJ21 (Floridsdorf)
- SJ22 (Donaustadt)
- SJ23 (Liesing)

However, is not represented in these 6:

- Innere Stadt (1st district)
- Alsergrund (9th district)
- Penzing (14th district)
- Währing (18th district)
- Döbling (19th district)
- Rudolfsheim-Fünfhaus (15th district)

In mid-November 2023, the board of the SJ Vienna, together with all districts, unanimously decided to dissolve the SJ9, which was part of the Funke (RCI; formerly IMT) fraction. According to official SJ statement, this decision was made partly due to longstanding unsolidary behavior and attempts to recruit SJ members for the Funke. Additionally, the dissolution occurred because the SJ9, or rather the Funke, participated in actions either solely as Funke or as SJ, exploiting the name and platform of the SJ for their own gain. However, according to the SPÖ, this dissolution occurred due to supposed anti-Israeli statements made during actions and calls for freedom in Palestine.

In 2021, the SJ7 was officially dissolved due to a decline in membership over the past years. However, in 2023, the board of SJ Vienna made the decision to aid in its refounding, and since then, the SJ7 has been active again. In mid-2024, it was decided to merge the two newly established SJ districts, SJ6 and SJ8, with the still-developing SJ7. This merger led to the creation of the temporary organization SJ6,7,8. The goal of this measure is to strengthen the groups. Once membership numbers have sufficiently grown, the three SJ districts will be officially reconstituted as independent district organizations.

The SJ11 meets in its historic venue at Drischützgasse 4. On October 16, 1932, this site became part of history when a group of armed Nazis raided the building, which was also the then district headquarters of the SDAP in Simmering. This attack resulted in four fatalities: two Viennese Nazis, the socialist policeman and member of the "Republikanischer Schutzbund" (English: Republican Protection League), Karl Tlasek, and an unsuspecting passerby named Therese Scherbaum. The attack had already been expected due to rumors and had been reinforced by a company of the Protection League earlier, which managed to repel the attackers. However, upon the arrival of the police, which protected the retreating Nazis, they stormed the Workers' Home. They beat the defenders inside, injuring many, including the Simmering SDAP district secretary Georg Medwed, and arrested over 100 individuals. A majority of the defenders were subsequently sentenced to 9 months in prison. Today, the SJ11 commemorates this event with their October 16 remembrance.

=== Separation of SJ Vorarlberg from the Federal Organization ===
On October 6, 2024, the state conference of the Socialist Youth Vorarlberg decided to separate from both the SPÖ and the SJÖ and to join the Revolutionary Communist Party (RKP), which is set to be founded on November 9, 2024. This decision was a response to dissatisfaction with the development of social democracy, which, in the view of SJ Vorarlberg, does not sufficiently focus on working-class politics.

Prior to this, the SJ Vorarlberg had issued a voting recommendation for the Communist Party of Austria (KPÖ) during the National Council election in 2024, which led to the exclusion of the SJ Vorarlberg board from the SPÖ.

The SJ Vorarlberg now operates under the name "Revolutionary Socialist Youth" (RSJ), though this is not to be confused with the historical RSJ that operated from 1934 to 1938.

== Political Orientation ==
The SJÖ explicitly adheres to Marxism and advocates for the overcoming of capitalism with the goal of socialism. The SJÖ is not only a clearly anti-capitalist organization but is also significantly shaped by anti-fascism, anti-racism, anti-imperialism, anti-militarism, and anti-patriarchy principles.

The SJÖ is not a completely homogeneous but rather a pluralistic organization. The fundamentally Marxist orientation regained dominance in 2000, prevailing over those parts of the organization that considered Marxism outdated and advocated for a "modernization", meaning a social-democratization of the SJÖ. Currently, the clear dominance of the Left, especially presented as an alliance of major regional organizations such as Lower Austria, Upper Austria, Vienna, Styria, and Burgenland, has stabilized within the SJÖ. During the congress in the fall of 2004, the SJÖ adopted a new program, the "Grundsatzprogramm", which aligns with scientific socialism in the spirit of Karl Marx and Friedrich Engels.

Although the Marxist Left currently holds hegemony in the SJÖ, it is also diverse. In addition to the moderate Marxist majority in the SJÖ, which is influenced, among other things, by the concept of Austromarxism, there is a smaller, more radical faction: the Trotskyist faction centered around the magazine Der Funke. There used to be a Marxist-Leninist faction that followed the "Stamokap" theory. The strongest non-Marxist part of the SJÖ is represented by the district organization in Linz.

The SJ officially supports a two-state solution in the Middle East conflict, with a strong emphasis on Palestinian self determination and borders regulated by United Nations Resolution 181 (II).

=== Relationship with the Social Democratic Party of Austria ===
Many SPÖ politicians have a history in the SJÖ, SAJ, and/or RSJ, including the later Federal Chancellor Bruno Kreisky, or the former secretary of the SJ Lower Austria and current SPÖ chairman Andreas Babler, former SPÖ chairman Alfred Gusenbauer was chairman of the SJÖ from 1984 to 1990, and former Chancellor and SPÖ chairman Werner Faymann was chairman of the SJ Vienna from 1981 to 1987.

However, the relationship between SJ and the mother party SPÖ has sometimes been tense, as SJ not only defended its programmatic independence (as with the German Jusos in relation to the SPD) but also always defended its organizational autonomy, which it continues to exercise today. This led to the establishment of a separate, less autonomous, youth organization within the SPÖ called "Junge Generation" (JG) (English: Young Generation) as a counterstructure to the too independent SJ. This organization was founded in 1958. While initially an attempt to establish a transitional, age structural bridge between SJÖ and SPÖ, the JG has become more or less a party affiliated parallel structure to SJ. However, the upper age limit for SJ remains 35 years, while any SPÖ member up to 38 years automatically is a member of the JG.

The SJÖ independence from the SPÖ, both in terms of organization and ideology, became apparent in 1991 when the SPÖ changed its name from the "Socialist Party of Austria" to "Social Democratic Party of Austria". This decision was not followed by the SJ and the majority of its members strongly and consistently rejected the renaming and continue to do so to this day.

== History ==
=== Beginnings ===
In 1893, reports surfaced about two youth groups active in the Viennese districts of Ottakring and Hernals. The Ottakringer group "Bücherskorpion" and the Hernalser group "Jugendbund" engaged in collective learning, reading, spelling exercises, and lectures on revolutionary works, gradually delving into social and political issues due to their daily experiences and hardships as apprentices. A joint event of the two youth groups led to the idea of forming a united association. With support from labor movement officials, organizational and substantive work began. On June 3, 1894, a founding assembly was held in Ottakring, leading to the formation of a committee tasked with drafting statutes and obtaining approval for the association's establishment from the authorities. Finally, on November 4, 1894, the Association of Young Workers was officially founded.

The establishment of the association laid the groundwork for addressing the problems and demands of young people within the Social Democratic Workers' Party (SDAPÖ). Despite initial resistance from parts of the party and unions, the Socialist Youth movement quickly became a vital element of the Austrian labor force. Young activists protested against the mistreatment of apprentices, facing opposition through the creation of "Black Lists" by guilds and the exclusion of prominent speakers and politically active individuals from apprenticeships. In 1897, a protest with more than 500 participants expressed discontent over the delayed approval of the association's statutes. The authorities could no longer prevent the new statute, and in rapid succession, local groups emerged in most districts of Vienna. Among the first were Leopoldstadt, Margareten, Meidling, Favoriten, Ottakring, and Brigittenau. In later years, groups formed in all districts of Vienna. It wasn't until 1901 that a second Association of Young Workers was founded in Graz, Styria.

Soon after, the youth actively participated in all party and union events. Despite occasional resistance and misunderstandings, there were genuine supporters and advocates for youth work within the party. At various congresses, youth representatives worked towards gaining acceptance for their activities from the Social Democratic Party. By 1903, most of the party resistance had been overcome, leading to a resolution at the SDAPÖ congress to actively support the youth movement. The subsequent 1907 party congress solidified the status of the youth movement by incorporating it into the party's statute.

=== "Der jugendliche Arbeiter" ===
As there was no dedicated means of relaying information, the association was forced to hand out laboriously crafted and manually reproduced pamphlets, limiting the potential of rapid expansion. There were many suggestions and discussions to solve this problem, but all attempts initially failed due to financial constraints. In 1901, the Margareten group established a private "Preßfond", for the potential founding of a newspaper. In the same year, the Viennese Association of Young Workers decided to create an official press fund in greater scale. Thus, on October 15, 1902, the first issue of the newspaper "Der jugendliche Arbeiter" (English: The Young Worker) was published.

Intermittently disrupted during the fascist period, the Austrian Workers' Youth has had an information tool in the media since then. The newspaper was sent to the then-independent associations, establishing close contact between individual functionaries and members. The question of financing was a persistent challenge. The founding conference of the association in 1903 decided to make the magazine the association's official organ, thereby establishing the responsibility of all branches of the organization for the newspaper.

The new newspaper primarily reported on practical apprentice issues but did not neglect important educational and cultural work. It successfully engaged prominent party leaders, including Leopold Winarsky, for popular "commemorative articles" or short biographies of great figures in socialism.

=== National Expansion ===
In 1903, the Viennese officials decided it was time for a nationwide association. Thus, on March 13, 1903, the founding conference of the Association of Youth Workers in Austria took place. Its chairman was Anton Jenschik from 1903 to 1918, until the end of First World War. Two prominent and influential figures to the association were Robert Danneberg and Leopold Winarsky. By the outbreak of World War I, the organization had grown to more than 16,000 members. The association congress formulated the following list of demands, which would significantly influence the further political development of the organization:

1. The apprenticeship period, including any possible probationary period, must not exceed two years.
2. A maximum working day of eight hours for all individuals under 18 years.
3. A 36-hour uninterrupted complete Sunday rest without clauses for all individuals under 18 years.
4. Abolition of the right to physical punishment.
5. Regulation of job placement.
6. State support for unemployed apprentices.
7. Gratuitous legal protection.
8. Employment of dedicated apprentice inspectors.
9. Prohibition of apprentices being used for domestic or any non-industrial work.
10. Mandatory introduction of daily classes in all industrial preparatory, advanced, and technical schools, with strict punishment for masters hindering their apprentices from attending these schools.
11. Arrest or significant fines for masters violating any of the mentioned provisions.

This resolution, adopted with similar content in all conferences until the establishment of the First Republic, served as the foundation for the association's subsequent political initiatives and projects.

=== The Youth International ===
Around the turn of the century, apprentice systems in other European countries mirrored those in Austria, giving rise to apprentice clubs, like the VJA, and youth groups in countries like Germany, Scandinavia, and France. The aftermath of the international congress of socialist parties in Stuttgart in 1907 saw representatives from various workers' youth organizations convening for the inaugural international conference of the Socialist Youth. Karl Liebknecht assumed the role of chairman, and Robert Danneberg became the secretary, establishing Vienna as the seat of the international secretariat. This first attempt at working together internationally among youth groups had three clear goals to fight against militarism, exploitation, and alcoholism. Key objectives included preventing future wars and enlightening youth about the nature of militarism.

A pivotal moment unfolded in 1912 when girls and young women gained the right to become members of the VJA, marking a significant development. Despite prioritizing the fight against militarism at the forefront of the political agenda, the youth organizations, including the Austrian and German Social Democrats, were unable to prevent the outbreak of the First World War. The war's onset saw nationalist sentiment sweeping through Europe, with patriotism surging in Germany, France, and Austria.

=== First Republic ===
The fall of the monarchy and the dissolution of the empire at the end of the First World War was followed with the proclamation of the First Austrian Republic on September 10, 1919. This ignited a revolutionary mood that swept through the entire population. The old regime with the despised k.u.k. administration had collapsed, ushering in a time when long overdue reforms with a revolutionary character could be realized. Karl Renner, a renowned socialist, headed the provisional government, with Karl Seitz becoming the Mayor of Vienna. Universal suffrage, extending to women as equal citizens, became a reality. The implementation of an 8-hour workday and internal leave for workers was implemented, and workers gained the right to elect their councils in the workplace.

The youth movement actively participated in this transformative period, achieving numerous reforms in the early days of the First Republic. Viennese apprentices successfully brought down a relic from the k.u.k. era on March 2, 1919. Triggered by a citywide strike of Viennese apprentices, new laws were swiftly enacted. The 5th congress in 1919 marked a generational change disrupted by First World War and sparked the expansion of the organization. In the same year, the organization changed its name to "Sozialistische Arbeiter-Jugend (SAJ)" (English: Socialist Workers Youth). By 1923, it had 38,000 members, and even in 1932, despite facing pressure from reactionaries, it still had 28,000 members in 528 groups. New, less political forms of organization and culture were introduced, such as hiking, dancing, camps, etc., to better capture and integrate the youth into the organization. The prevention of youth depoliticization was solely attributed to the overt class contradictions between the workers and the capital. With attacks on the social achievements of the labor movement, the capital targeted the socialist youth, and during this time, a significant number of SAJ members faced unemployment.

The strength of the SAJ primarily lay in the high level of its content work, discussions, and training, as well as its organizational prowess. This made it the leading force in supporting both parliamentary and extraparliamentary struggles of the youth for their social rights. Internal discourse during these years revolved around whether the politically combative line, represented by individuals like Manfred Ackermann, or the socialist cultural and educational work, advocated by Felix Kanitz, should take precedence within the framework of a political youth movement. In the "directional dispute" of 1926, Felix Kanitz emerged as the "victor". However, the Socialist Workers Youth still remained a heavily politicized organization.

=== Advance of Fascism ===
Against the backdrop of Adolf Hitler's rise to power in Germany, the SAJ began preparations for illegal activities for the first time. A telling example of the reactionary nature of Austria's bourgeois parties at the time is the ban of the screening of Erich Maria Remarque's "All Quiet on the Western Front" in 1931. The Viennese Socialist Youth had to embark on journeys by train to Pressburg to view the film. The signs of the decline of Austrian democracy had begone for those who were willing to observe.

Months prior to the February 12, 1934 Civil War, or "February Uprising", the commencement of the armed conflict between Austro-fascism led by Chancellor Engelbert Dollfuss, his paramilitary Heimwehren, and the Austrian workers movement, discussions on forms of resistance and underground struggle were already underway within the SAJ. The ban of the SDAPÖ and the dismantling of its structures, including youth organizations, prompted a complete reorientation of the organization. The mass organization was transitioned into a covert underground organization. Its objectives were clear: defending the socialist spirit in youth against the intellectual terror of the fascists, encompassing both the Heimwehren and the National Socialists, through training and education; and mobilizing against the severe deterioration of the social situation of the Socialist Workers Youth through illegal pamphlet campaigns.

==== Revolutionary Socialist Youth ====
As a successor organization from the prohibited SDAPÖ, and from the SAJ, on February 19, 1934 the "Revolutionäre Sozialistische Jugend" (RSJ) (English: Revolutionary Socialist Youth) emerged. The RSJ could largely draw on the youth functionaries from the SAJ, as most of them were unemployed and did not want to lose the socialist youth community that had given their lives a self determined purpose.

Together with the Revolutionary Socialists, the RSJ attempted to take a mediating position between the reformist social democratic and the communist oriented worker movements. They supported Otto Bauer's concept of "Integral Socialism". Bauer suggested that socialists and communists should reunite, as they did before the First World, in a single party. Bauer acknowledged that this unity was complicated, more than a mere mechanical addition. Integral Socialism was meant to be a synthesis of the revolutionary-turned-social democratic reformism and the democratically evolved revolutionary Bolshevism.

After 1934, young socialists faced severe consequences for their involvement in the resistance movement. Josef Gerl, a Viennese RSJ functionary, was executed on July 24, 1934, due to a denied pardon request by Austrofascist Chancellor Engelbert Dollfuss. Roman Felleis, one of the first RSJ leaders, died in a concentration camp in 1945. Bruno Kreisky, later party chairman and Federal Chancellor, defended socialist principles during the major Socialist trial of 1936. In this trial, Kreisky stated, "I have already said that I am still a socialist. Neither the government's actions nor the attentive reading of non-socialist and anti-Marxist works have suggested any solution other than socialism to me. I continue to believe that class struggle is the only means of liberating the working class". With Hitler's army invading Austria in March 1938, both the Revolutionary Socialists and the RSJ ceased their activities. Some socialists persisted in resistance groups, with many paying the ultimate price, including the RSJ's final leaders, Hans Kunks and Stefanie Kunks.

==== Socialist Youth - International (SJI) ====
In the years of persecution and isolation of the Revolutionary Socialist Youth in Austria, the support from the international socialist movement naturally played a significant role. Particularly, the material assistance generously provided by the Sudeten German and other associations, along with the diverse ways of political and moral support, proved to be extremely valuable. In contrast, the political importance and effectiveness of the SJI remained rather low.

The Executive Committee and Bureau meetings, as well as the congresses (in Copenhagen, August 1935, and in Lille, August 1939), were marked by intense conflicts reflecting the divisions and issues of the international socialist movement at that time. "The socialist Internationals", later remarked the Austrian Revolutionary Socialist Joseph Buttinger critically, "continued their social democratic course undeterred by all the upheavals of the time, and their effective impact was then, as before, close to zero". Against the dominance of the right-wing majority in the SJl (Sweden, Denmark, Holland, Germany, Czechoslovakia, and others), which also included the chairpersons (Koos Vorrink 1932-1935, Hans Christian Hansen 1935-1939, Torsten Nilsson from 1939), the secretary (Erich Ollenhauer), and most of the Bureau and Executive Committee members, a radical opposition formed primarily around France and Belgium. "The Belgian comrades", declared their representative at the Executive Committee meeting on March 31 and April 1, 1937, in Brussels, "miss the necessary initiative in the leadership of the International and regret the lack of revolutionary solutions. The Socialist Youth International is too dependent on the feeble and reformist policies of the SAI (Socialist Workers International)".

The Left primarily advocated for a more politically active stance within the socialist youth movement, collaboration with Communists, and a positive stance toward the Soviet Union, particularly following the initiation of the Popular Front policy at the 7th World Congress of the Comintern or the 6th World Congress of the Communist Youth International (KJI) in 1935. They also pushed for an orientation towards the dictatorship of the proletariat. In 1936, when oppositional associations from France, Belgium, and Italy convened a special conference in Toulouse, proposing the formation of a working group of revolutionary socialist youth (a so-called Left bloc) and suggesting the division of the SJI into political and cultural sections, a split was narrowly avoided with the approval of other organizations. The illegal socialist youth of Austria, represented by Ernst Papanek (code name Ernst Pek), sympathized with the Left bloc but pledged loyalty in an agreement in early 1937. However, tensions arose when French delegates, less radical and more opportunist, welcomed the Munich Agreement of 1938. Austrian representatives strongly opposed this stance, arguing that the German working class did not anticipate liberation from fascism through a new war, but demanded that powers refrain from aiding Hitler's further expansion.

===== Spanish Civil War =====
The SJI gained substantial political significance solely during the Spanish Civil War, spanning from 1936 to 1939. Following the eruption of the military uprising, the socialist workers' movement, including the SJI and its affiliated associations, swiftly initiated extensive political and material support measures for the legal republican government. This effort ultimately evolved into the most significant solidarity action in the history of the international workers' movement. In pursuit of the Spanish struggle for freedom, the SJI leadership transcended its anti-communist stance and unanimously integrated the United Socialist Youth of Spain. This integration took place in April 1937. During the summer of 1937, when an SJI delegation visited Spain, direct contacts were established with the KJI at the request of the Spaniards. Hansen, Ollenhauer, and the KJI General Secretary Michal Wolf agreed to escalate aid for Spain. Additionally, Ernst Papanek, the representative of the RSJ, who had been leading the SJI's Spanish efforts since early 1937, was appointed as an official envoy to the non-partisan International Aid Commission for Spanish Youth. Moreover, thousands of young socialists, including numerous Austrians, volunteered in the International Brigades, alongside workers' militias, anarchists, and Trotskyists. However, despite their efforts, they could not thwart the victory of the Franco regime, which received substantial support from Germany and Italy. After the Socialist Workers' Party of Spain severed ties with the unified youth organization in March 1939 and reinstated its own youth movement, the (Communist) United Socialist Youth of Spain was unanimously expelled from the SJI at the 1939 Lille Congress, with 39 abstentions. Following such experiences, compounded soon after by the Hitler-Stalin Pact, all illusions of popular front and united front within the socialist youth ranks dissipated.

===== Dissolution Process of the SJI =====
In terms of organization, the SJI managed to endure the severe political upheavals relatively well, which resulted in relocating its secretariat from Prague to Paris in May 1938. After incorporating the Polish youth league "Zukunft" (English: Future) and the large Norwegian workers' youth association in 1937, the SJI had integrated all socialist youth organizations in Europe but struggled to gain traction outside the continent. By the end of 1934, the SJI comprised associations in multiple countries. By December 31, 1938, it had expanded further, with associations in even more countries. Additionally, there were the World Organization of Jewish Socialist Youth DROR, which had associations across several countries, and the International Socialist Students' Federation, facing significant challenges. Overall, by December 31, 1938, excluding the members of the Spanish unified organization, the SJI comprised associations in numerous countries.

However, this success story did not reflect the fact that several associations were illegal, and some existed only on paper. Due to the heavy defeats of the European workers' movement, the SJI entered an unstoppable process of dissolution. Its last meetings were the 6th Congress in Lille in the summer of 1939, where Bruno Kreisky, future Austrian Chancellor, under the code name "Pichler", spoke as a representative of the illegal socialist youth movement of Austria, and an office meeting on February 27, 1940, in Brussels. Following the military and political debacle of the democracies in the spring of 1940, the SJI, the SAI, and soon thereafter (1942) the Comintern and the KJI ceased their activities.

=== New beginnings post-war era ===
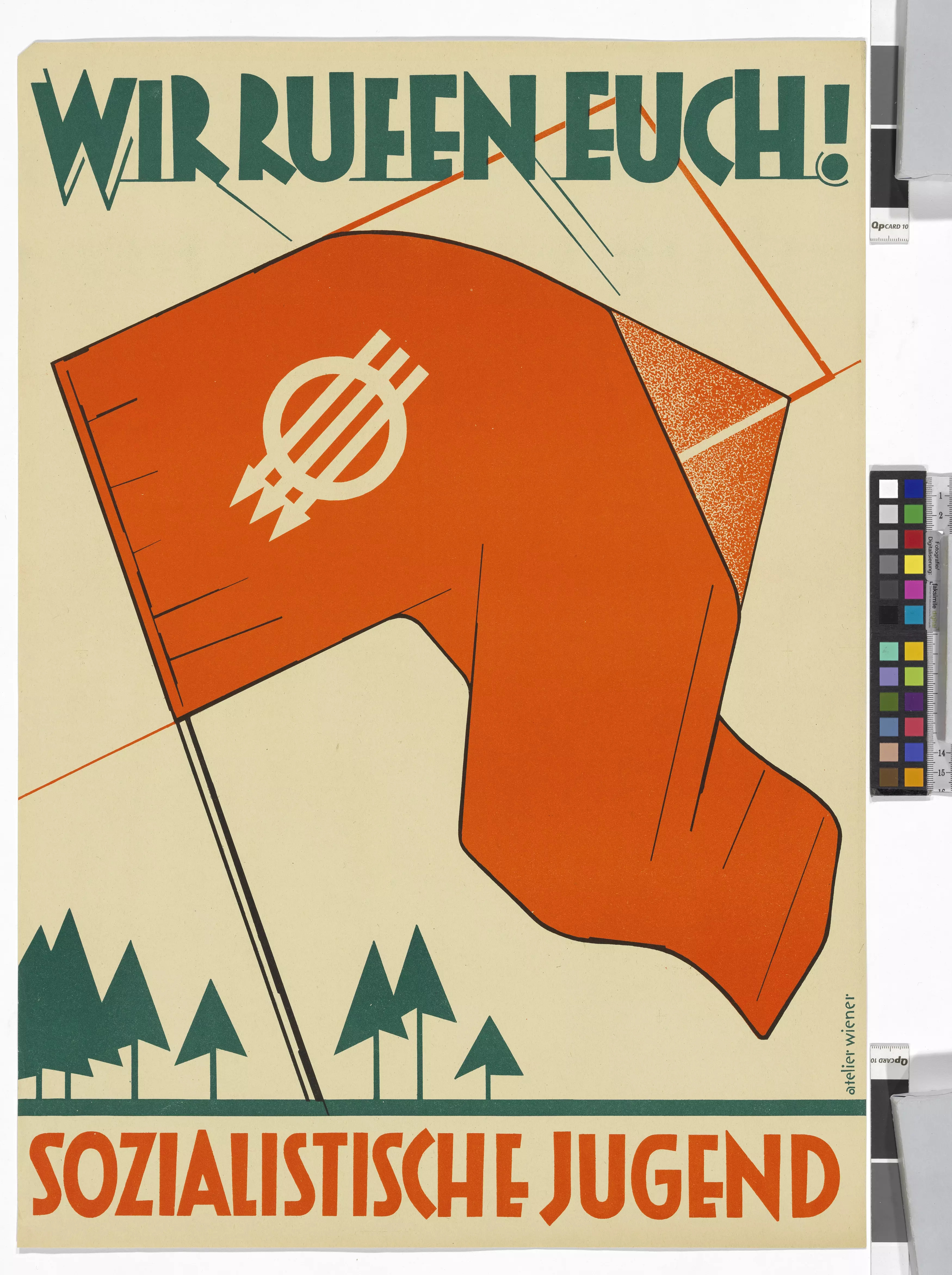
Poster of the Socialist Youth "We are calling you"

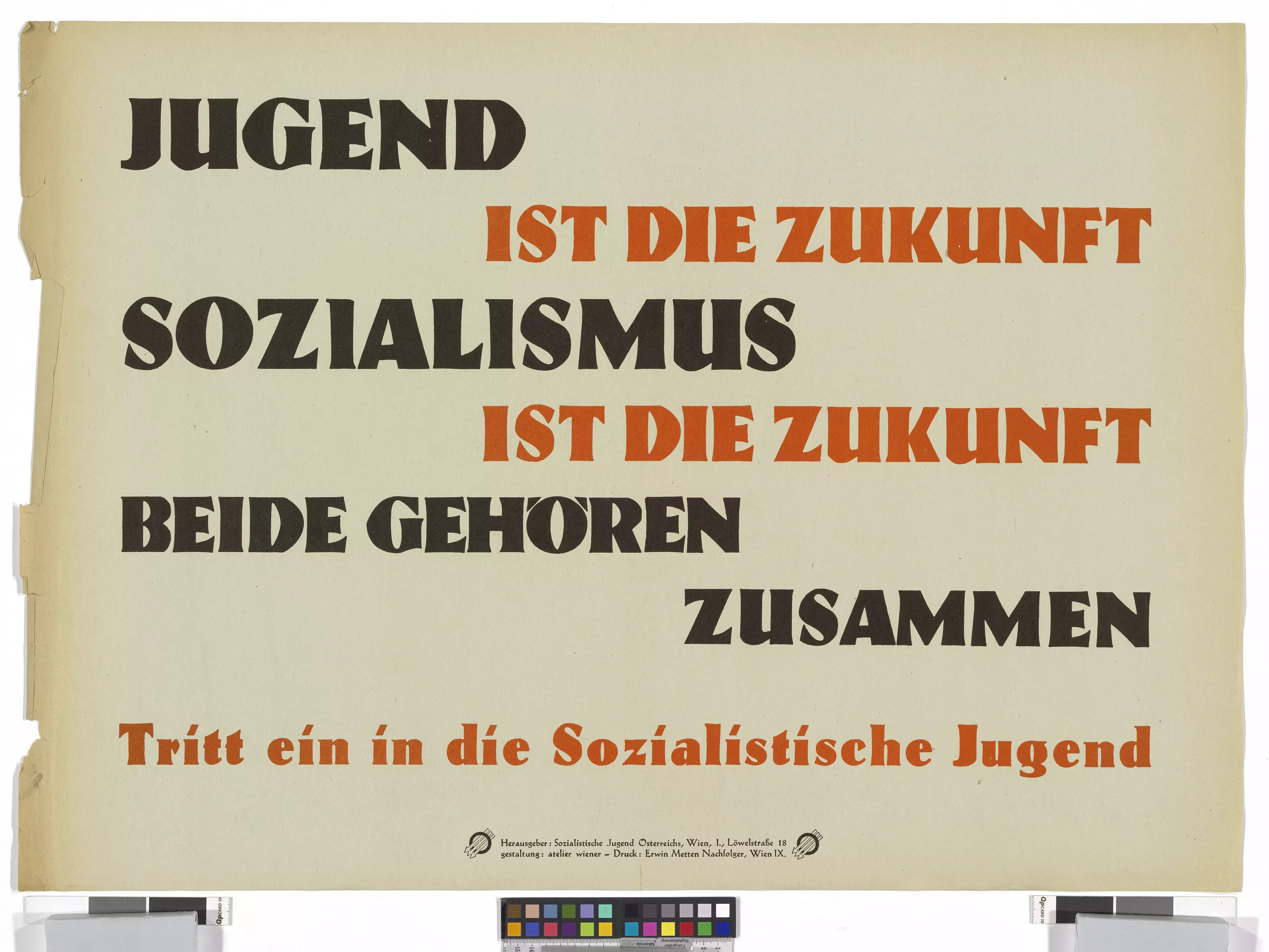
Recruitment poster " Youth is the future, Socialism is the future. both belong together. Join the Socialist Youth"

After World War II, the organization was finally reconstituted under its current name, Socialist Youth of Austria (SJÖ). The first association day (federal conference) took place from December 7 to 9, 1946. Peter Strasser became the first chairman of the SJÖ, a position he held until 1954.

The foundation for the re-establishment of the organization was a rally of around 1,000 youths in the Brigittenau district of Vienna. At that time, the approval of the Allied occupation forces was necessary. Since the rally was not prohibited, it was seen as a approval by the occupying forces. Nevertheless, officials in other provinces were often required to report to the local military commanders.

At the first youth association day, there were attempts by the communist Free Austrian Youth to take over, but these were quickly halted by the SJ. In the following years, until the signing of the "Staatsvertrag", there were several clashes between communists and socialists.

In 1948, the association's newspaper "Trotzdem" was founded. Its predecessor, "Stimme der Jugend" (English: Voice of the Youth), first appeared immediately after the end of World War II but was banned after several warnings by the Soviet occupying forces.

In the 1950s, the theme of participation was programmatically at the forefront. In 1952, a social program for working youth was adopted, and six years later, the campaign "Let the Youth Participate" was agreed upon. At that time, the recognition of youth in society was demanded. Another core issue was Austria's neutrality and national defense. In this area, there was considerable agreement with the SPÖ. While the demand for a maximum service time in the armed forces of four months could not be implemented, the SPÖ negotiated a similar draft law with the conservative Austrian People's Party (ÖVP), which provided for a maximum service time of six months.

=== Depoliticization ===
The 5th association day brought a generational change. Peter Strasser, founder and the last member of the first association board, was replaced as chairman by Heinz Nittel. In the following years, the SJ became increasingly depoliticized and membership numbers declined. As a countermeasure, the Aktion Kader (Cadre Action) was developed: the SJ recruited a cadre of functionaries to combat the internal crisis. Despite these efforts, the crisis could not be resolved. Based on a suggestion from SJ member Fritz Koppe, educational work within the organization began.

In December 1964, the 10th association day of the Socialist Youth took place. At that time, both the SPÖ (due to the Olah affair) and the SJ were in crisis. After 10 years at the helm of the organization, Heinz Nittel was voted out as chairman of the SJ. His successor, Peter Schieder, was tasked with leading the association out of the crisis. By the mid-1960s, membership numbers, which had previously been declining, began to rise again. In March 1965, the SJ protested against the neo-fascist university professor Taras Borodajkewycz. During a large demonstration by the Austrian Resistance Movement, which was also supported by the SJ, KPÖ member Ernst Kirchweger was killed by violent young fascists.

Towards the end of the 1960s, the protest movements in which the Socialist Youth participated grew larger. During this time, the then chairman Peter Schieder summarized the political situation with the following words:

It is about political demands. The serious protest is directed against the senile and fossilized, against the stagnant elements in society, against those who have settled comfortably and do not want to hear anything new, against the establishment. This makes the movement attractive to thinking young people [...] This will have its effects in many areas and also in our movement. New forms will be tested, and new methods of action will need to be found.

— Peter Schieder

=== Politics under SPÖ majority government ===
In the following years, Schieder attempted to unite the Socialist Youth with the Junge Generation. However, this effort failed due to internal resistance. In 1968, the SJ aligned itself with the Socialist Students of Austria (VSStÖ) took on a mediating role in the conflict with the SPÖ. This led to a dispute with the right-wing faction of the Social Democratic Party, including then-Minister of Defense Karl Lütgendorf. During this time, the Socialist Youth sought to reduce military service to six months and, as a compromise, accepted an additional weapons training period of 60 days.

Under the sole governance of the Social Democrats led by Bruno Kreisky from 1970 to 1983, several demands of the SJ were implemented, such as the introduction of civilian service and the reduction of working hours for youth to 40 hours per week. Under Johann Hatzl, who became chairman of the Socialist Youth in 1973, a "Fackelzug" protest march was held again in 1974 after a long time. In a call for the 1975 election campaign, a critical decision of the SPÖ was included, which was intended to distance the SJ from the party.

=== Leftward shift with Ackerl and Cap ===
When Hatzl joined the National Council in 1976 after the formation of Bruno Kreisky's third cabinet, another leadership change took place within the organization, and Josef Ackerl became the new chairman. Alongside then association secretaries Josef Cap and Reinhard Todt, a radical shift to the left was enacted, bridging towards Marxism.

The SJÖ must work towards making the capitalist system more clearly recognizable as a source of conflict for the labor movement in order to fully exploit all possibilities to advance the process of establishing a socialist social order.

— Excerpt from the 1976 fundamental declaration

As a self-proclaimed "left socialist force", the SJ held another association day in 1978, which saw yet another leadership change: Josef Cap replaced Josef Ackerl as chairman. Cap steered the party even further to the left of the political spectrum. Key issues at that time included reducing working hours, addressing peace concerns, and positioning against the construction of the Zwentendorf nuclear power plant. Although the SJÖ clearly opposed the nuclear plant, the chairman of the Lower Austrian SJ, Karl Schlögl, advocated strongly in favor of it. The result of the referendum on the plant's operation was very close, with 50.5% opposing the nuclear power plant, allowing the opponents to prevail.

In 1982, following contact with the British Militant Tendency, the Trotskyist "Gruppe Vorwärts" (today the Socialist Left Party (SLP)) was founded within the SJ. After many Vorwärts members were expelled between 1991 and 1992, the group decided to end entryism in the SJ and SPÖ. They followed the example of the Militant Tendency, which also ceased entryism. However, some members wanted to continue entryism and split off to create the magazine Der Funke, which also emerged within the SPÖ. Later, Der Funke joined the International Marxist Tendency (IMT). The larger and more influential faction within the SJ consisted of those who adhered to Austromarxism.

Even beyond this fundamental orientation issue, the SJ positions itself to the left of the parent party on specific issues. This means that most of the SPÖ's reformist demands are articulated more radically by the SJ, and SPÖ proposals and policies are often sharply criticized and directly rejected by the SJ. This was the case in 1978, for example, when then-SPÖ Chancellor Bruno Kreisky wanted to operate the Zwentendorf nuclear power plant, which was prevented by a referendum. In 1994, when Austria voted on joining the EU under SPÖ Chancellor Franz Vranitzky, the SJ was highly critical of this accession, and many parts (such as the Lower Austrian organization) rejected EU membership. On other issues as well, the SJÖ positions itself much more radically than the parent party, advocating for the abolition of the Austrian Federal Army and the legalization of soft drugs (cannabis), for example.

=== Another leftward shift under Andreas Kollross ===
Under the leadership of Andreas Kollross, the Socialist Youth of Austria (SJÖ) experienced a revival after a long period of stagnation. Dozens of new local and district groups were founded in almost all federal states, and the organization became increasingly politicized, signaling a resurgence of the Socialist Youth. At the 2004 conference, a new program was adopted, which explicitly referred to Scientific Socialism and was clearly anti-capitalist and feminist in orientation.

=== Dvorak Becomes chairman and a new program is adopted ===
After four years, Ludwig Dvorak replaced Andreas Kollross as chairman in 2004. He was elected by 81.6 percent of the approximately 200 delegates at the conference. Under Ludwig Dvorak, the SJ committed to anti-capitalist, anti-militarist, anti-fascist, internationalist, and anti-sexist policies. In January 2005, the Socialist Youth launched a campaign titled "Den Rechten die Zähne zeigen" (English: Show Your Teeth to the Right), which led to the annual "Antifa Month," concluding with the Antifa Seminar and the Liberation Celebration of the Mauthausen concentration camp, becoming a regular event dedicated to anti-fascist activism and education.

=== Torsten Engelage Takes over as chairman for one year ===
Torsten Engelage became the new chairman of the SJ in September 2006, replacing Ludwig Dvorak. The focus for the next two years was on regaining organizational strength, with anti-sexist work also becoming a priority. In the National Council elections in 2006, former SJ chairman Alfred Gusenbauer led the Social Democrats to victory as the top candidate. The SJ campaigned aggressively for a minority government instead of a coalition with the ÖVP and warned against a grand coalition without a clear social-democratic imprint.

After the coalition agreement between the SPÖ and ÖVP was concluded in January 2007, the SJ strongly opposed the party leadership, criticizing the lack of a social-democratic influence in the government document. As a result, the SPÖ's federal headquarters on Löwelstraße was briefly occupied by the SJ. After only a year as chairman, Torsten Engelage stepped down, and Wolfgang Moitzi, chairman of the SJ Styria, succeeded him.

=== Wolfgang Moitzi unites the organization ===
Wolfgang Moitzi managed to reunite the organization during his interim chairmanship. In October 2007, he was elected chairman at the 32nd regular conference of the SJ in Linz with 90.52 percent of the vote. Additionally, at this conference, a 50 percent women's quota for the executive board was approved and subsequently upheld. The SJ thus positioned itself within the SPÖ as a champion of feminist policies and continues to defend the women's quota, which is often ignored in the SPÖ.

With the initiative "The Rich Must Pay", the SJ focused on advocating for wealth taxes in response to the 2008 financial crisis, seeking allies and applying internal party pressure. Despite initial resistance from the SPÖ, the SJ managed to achieve a policy shift at the 2010 federal party congress, where the reintroduction of wealth taxes was approved within the SPÖ at the SJ's request.

=== Focus on international work and IUSY World Festival ===
Starting in 2008, the SJ renewed its focus on international work. In July 2011, for the first time in decades, an IUSY World Festival was held in Austria. Around 3,000 participants from around the world gathered at the SJ's Europacamp to exchange ideas about their political work. Just days before the festival, the right-wing extremist attacks on the summer camp of the Norwegian sister organization Workers' Youth League (AUF) took place. Despite this terrorist act, the IUSY Festival was a success, and through extensive media coverage, it made a statement of remembrance under the motto "We are all AUF activists". This international festival helped bring international work back into the organization's consciousness. This new approach to international work was also reflected in the SJ's representation in the presidiums of the European and international umbrella organizations YES (formerly ECOSY) and IUSY by Sebastian Schublach, Boris Ginner, and Sandra Breiteneder, as well as Anna Bruckner and Naomi Dutzi, starting in 2010. In 2012/13, together with other European sister organizations, the SJ successfully launched its first international campaign, "RISE UP".

=== Federal party congress 2012 and referendum on general conscription ===
At the 2012 SPÖ federal party congress, the SJ called for more democratic and participatory structures, as well as a new party program. Despite resistance from the party leadership, these demands were accepted at the congress, and corresponding working groups were established. Since 2012, the SJ has been advocating for the implementation of these reforms. At the 2014 federal party congress, a motion was passed allowing all party members to vote on the new party program for the first time, introducing mandatory thematic councils, and facilitating referendums.

During Austria's first nationwide referendum on the retention of general conscription, the SPÖ made a 180-degree turn and became a proponent of a professional army. The SJ remained true to its position in this debate, advocating for the medium-term retention of general conscription and the long-term complete abolition of the military.

=== Opposition to continuation of the SPÖ-ÖVP Coalition ===
With its own campaign titled "GEHT’S NET, GIBT’S NET," the SJ was also active in the 2013 National Council election campaign. A key focus was on affordable housing, a traditional social-democratic issue that the SJ campaigned on for months, bringing it back into public debate. Due to increasing pressure, the SPÖ once again felt compelled to adopt many of the SJ's demands. The election results were disappointing, with a significant rise in right-wing populist forces. Despite receiving over 5,000 preferential votes, Wolfgang Moitzi narrowly missed securing a direct mandate in Upper Styria. The SJ clearly positioned itself against the continuation of the "Grand Coalition" and advocated for a referendum on the coalition agreement within the SPÖ. In the first months of the new Faymann II government, the SJ established itself as a strong force for ending the Grand Coalition and pushing for a change in policy.

=== Julia Herr becomes the first female chairperson ===
The conference on May 4, 2014, in Graz was marked by the first double candidacy in a long time. Fiona Kaiser, who was mainly supported by Lower Austria, Upper Austria, Tyrol, and Vorarlberg, and Julia Herr, the candidate backed by the regional organizations of Burgenland, Vienna, Styria, and Salzburg, both ran for the chairmanship. This led to a months-long broad discussion about new organizational forms and more democratic structures within the SJ. Both candidates' programs included a commitment to the program of 2004 and the Marxist orientation of the organization. Julia Herr was eventually elected as the first female chairperson in the history of the Socialist Youth of Austria, with 54% of the vote.

In mid-2014, the SJ succeeded in bringing the issue of cannabis legalization back into the public debate with the relaunch of the campaign "Better to Get High and Make Love than to Drive Drunk". Other parties, such as The Greens and NEOS, joined the debate in response to the SJ's demand, and a petition to the National Council gathered around 30,000 signatures.

=== Refugee Crisis 2015 ===
In 2015, as around two million people fled to European Union countries, the SJ actively participated in relief efforts. Under the motto "Refugees welcome! Together we are stronger", the SJ clearly positioned itself in favor of humane asylum policies and against exploitation by far-right populist parties like the FPÖ.

=== National Council election 2017 and Black-Blue coalition ===
Following the 2017 National Council election, in which the ÖVP under Sebastian Kurz achieved a relative majority for the first time since 2004, a new coalition government was formed between the ÖVP and FPÖ. The SJ responded to this coalition formation with a "Resistance Campaign" against the Black-Blue government, accusing the then-government of social cutbacks and racism. Examples included the introduction of the 12-hour workday, the dismantling of the self-governance of social insurance institutions, and the introduction of racist German classes.

=== Ibiza scandal and National Council election 2019 ===
After initial reports on the "Ibiza video" were published on May 17, 2019, the SJ organized a demonstration at Ballhausplatz the following day, which drew around 10,000 participants. There, chairwoman Julia Herr called for an end to the Black-Blue coalition government and new elections, arguing that Sebastian Kurz had made the corruption possible.

Julia Herr ran in the subsequent EU elections, placing 6th on the SPÖ list, where she received the second-highest number of preferential votes among SPÖ candidates. In the 2019 National Council election, she ran in 7th place on the SPÖ's federal list and was elected to the National Council.

=== Paul Stich becomes chairman ===
At the 2020 conference, Julia Herr decided not to run for another term. Paul Stich was elected as her successor with around 88 percent of the vote. Stich emphasized the need for taxing the super-rich and reiterated the demand for a progressive millionaire's tax with a top rate of 80 percent for wealth exceeding two billion euros.

The years 2020 and 2021 were marked by the COVID-19 pandemic, which forced the Socialist Youth to cancel or hold some of its political events and seminars online. Despite these challenges, the SJ managed to continue its political work and maintain its diverse structures.

=== Position on 2023 leadership election ===
Following ongoing internal disputes within the SPÖ and significant losses in the state elections in Lower Austria and Carinthia, SJ chairman Paul Stich was the first to call for an early party congress to "clarify the leadership issue" and restore credibility. The SJ also reiterated its longstanding demand for a direct election of the party chairman by all SPÖ members. In the subsequent membership poll, the Socialist Youth supported the ultimately successful candidacy of Andreas Babler. Stich believed Babler most credibly represented the idea of "bottom-up" politics.

=== Larissa Zivkovic becomes Chairwoman ===
At the extraordinary congress on February 22, 2025, in Vienna, Larissa Zivkovic, former secretary of SJ Upper Austria, was elected as the new chairwoman of the Socialist Youth with 90.05 percent of the votes, making her the second female SJ chairwoman.

In her inaugural speech, Zivkovic emphasized the importance of democratizing the workplace as a key prerequisite for a strong and resilient democracy. She called for greater co-determination rights for employees in companies and advocated for a mandatory veto right for workers on essential corporate decisions.

She announced her commitment to fighting with full force for a fairer society in which economic power is democratically controlled.

== Memberships ==
At the national level, the Socialist Youth is a member of the "Österreichischen Bundesjugendvertretung" (English: Austrian Federal Youth Representation) (founded in 1953 as the "Federal Youth Ring"), which includes 40 democratic child and youth organizations as members. Additionally, the Socialist Youth is part of several alliances, such as the "Offensive gegen Rechts".

== SJÖ Chairpersons (after 1945) ==
- 1946–1954: Peter Strasser (Vienna)
- 1954–1964: Heinz Nittel (Vienna)
- 1964–1972: Peter Schieder (Vienna)
- 1972–1976: Johann Hatzl (Vienna)
- 1976–1978: Josef Ackerl (Upper Austria)
- 1978–1984: Josef Cap (Vienna)
- 1984–1990: Alfred Gusenbauer (Lower Austria)
- 1990–1992: Martin Winkler (Upper Austria)
- 1992–1996: Karl Delfs (Burgenland)
- 1996–2000: Robert Pichler (Styria)
- 2000–2004: Andreas Kollross (Lower Austria)
- 2004–2006: Ludwig Dvorak (Vienna)
- 2006–2008: Torsten Engelage (Lower Austria)
- 2008–2014: Wolfgang Moitzi (Styria)
- 2014–2020: Julia Herr (Burgenland)
- 2020–2025: Paul Stich (Vienna)
- 2025–Present: Larissa Zivkovic (Upper Austria)

== Literature ==
- Peter Pelinka: Die Geschichte der Sozialistischen Jugend Österreichs nach 1945. Sozialistische Jugend Österreich, Vienna, 1977.
- Josef Hochgerner: Stellung und Bedeutung der Sozialistischen Jugend Österreich <SJÖ> als linke Strömung in der SPÖ. Österreichisches Institut für Jugendkunde. Vienna, 1979.
- Peter Pelinka: 90 Jahre SJÖ 1894–1984 – Die Geschichte der Sozialistischen Jugend. With an introduction by Alfred Gusenbauer. Sozialistische Jugend Österreich. Vienna, 1984.
- 90 Jahre Sozialistische Jugend: Manifest der Jugend. Sozialistische Jugend Österreich, Vienna, 1984.
- 40 Jahre Sozialistische Jugend Wien. Sozialistische Jugend Wien, Vienna, 1985.
