= Stadttempel =

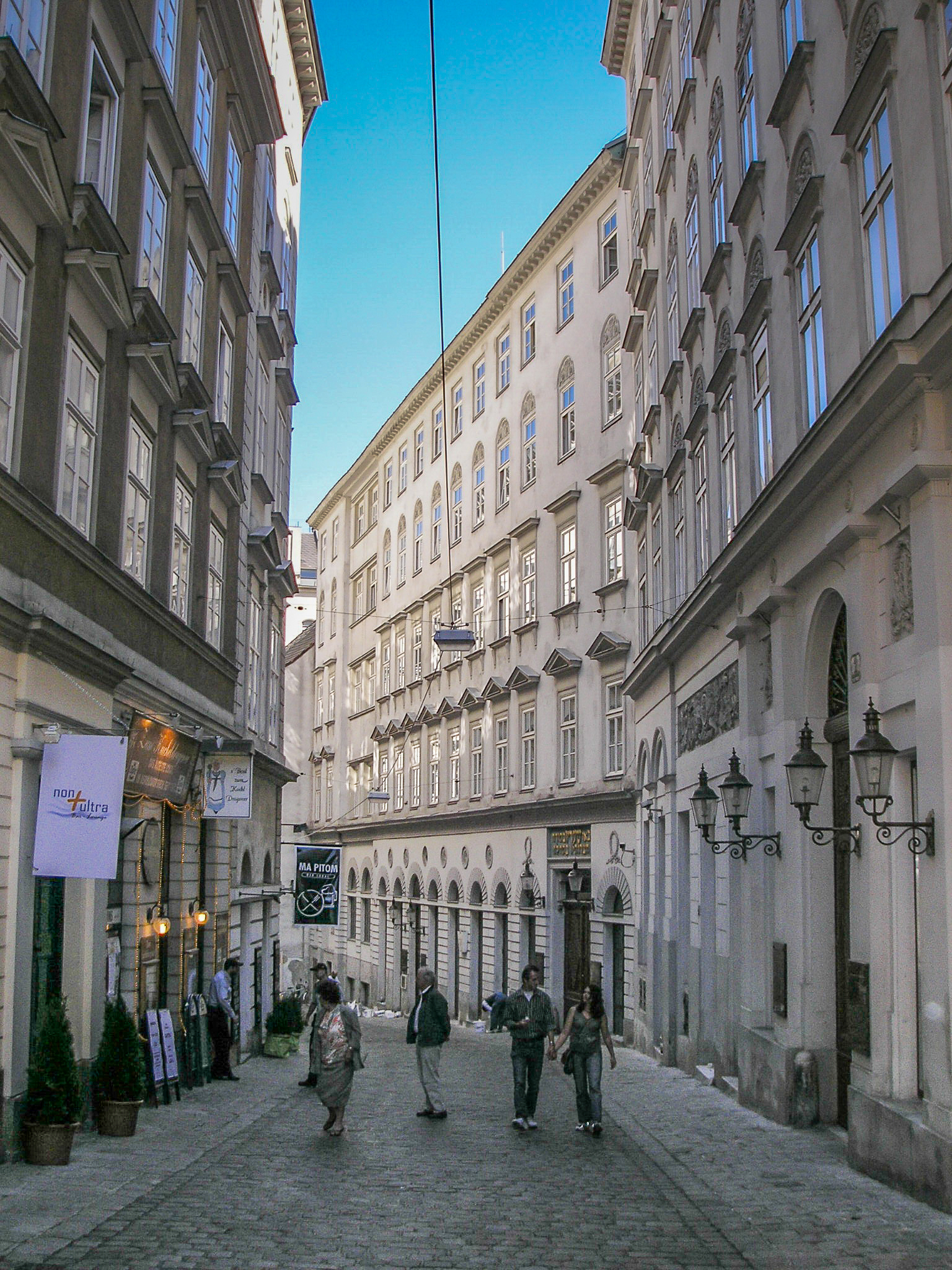
- Main building of the Jewish community, housing the temple in the Seitenstettengasse 4

- Location of the synagogue in Austria

Religion
- Affiliation: Orthodox Judaism
- Rite: Nusach Ashkenaz
- Ecclesiastical or organisational status: Synagogue
- Leadership: Rabbi Jaron Engelmayer; Rabbi Schlomo Hofmeister (Emeritus)
- Status: Active

Location
- Location: Seitenstettengasse 4, Innere Stadt 1st district, Vienna
- Country: Austria
- Coordinates: 48°12′42″N 16°22′29″E

Architecture
- Architects: Joseph Kornhäusel (1826); Wilhelm Stiassny (1904); Otto Niedermoser (1963)
- Type: Synagogue architecture
- Style: Biedermeier; Classical Revival
- General contractor: Jacob Heinz (supervisor)
- Completed: 1826

Website
- www.ikg-wien.at

The Stadttempel (English: City Prayer House), also called the Seitenstettengasse Temple, is an Orthodox Jewish synagogue, located at Seitenstettengasse 4, in the Innere Stadt 1st district of Vienna, Austria. Completed in 1826, it is the main synagogue in Vienna. The congregation worships in the Ashkenazi rite.

== History ==
The synagogue was constructed from 1824 to 1826. The luxurious Stadttempel was fitted into a block of houses and hidden from plain view of the street, because of an edict issued by Emperor Joseph II that only Roman Catholic places of worship were allowed to be built with facades fronting directly on to public streets.

This edict saved the synagogue from total destruction during the Kristallnacht in November 1938, since the synagogue could not be destroyed without setting on fire the buildings to which it was attached. The Stadttempel was the only synagogue in the city to survive World War II, as Nazi paramilitary troops with the help of local authorities destroyed all of the other 93 synagogues and Jewish prayer-houses in Vienna, starting with the Kristallnacht.

In August 1950, the coffins of Theodor Herzl and his parents were displayed at the synagogue, prior to their transfer for reburial in Israel.

In the 1981 Vienna synagogue attack, two people from a bar mitzvah ceremony at the synagogue were murdered and thirty injured when Palestinian Arab terrorists attacked the synagogue with machine guns and hand grenades. On 2 November 2020, a terrorist attack near the synagogue left four civilians dead and 23 others wounded. It was not immediately certain if the synagogue was the target of the attack.

Today the synagogue is the main house of prayer for the Viennese Jewish Community of about 7,000 members.

The synagogue has been declared a historic monument.

The synagogue underwent renovation in 1895 and again in 1904 by the Jewish architect Wilhelm Stiassny, adding considerable ornamentation, and, in the opinion of architectural historian Rachel Wischnitzer, "the serene harmony of the design was spoiled by renovations." Damage inflicted on Kristallnacht was repaired in 1949. The "Stadttempel" was renovated once again in 1963 by Prof. Otto Niedermoser.

Following ten and a half months of restoration and renovation starting in 2025, the Stadttempel reopened on 9 September 2026, two days before Rosh Hashanah. The renovation included work on the building's technical infrastructure, fire safety and accessibility, as well as the restoration of the interior and improvements to its acoustics. The reopening formed part of celebrations marking the 200th anniversary of the synagogue.

As part of the 2026 reopening ceremonies, the congregation inaugurated a new Torah scroll on September 15. Portions incorporated text from earlier manuscripts written in medieval Vienna's synagogue.

== Architecture ==
The synagogue was designed in elegant Biedermeier style by the Viennese architect Joseph Kornhäusel, architect to Johann I Joseph, Prince of Liechtenstein, for whom he had built palaces, theaters and other buildings. Construction was supervised by the official municipal architect, Jacob Heinz.

Two five-story apartment houses, Numbers 2 and 4 Seitenstettengasse, were built at the same time as the synagogue, designed by the architect to screen the synagogue from the street in compliance with the Patent of Toleration, which permitted members of tolerated faiths to worship in clandestine churches, but not in buildings with facades on public streets. The synagogue is structurally attached to the apartment building at #4 Seitenstettengasse.

The synagogue itself is in the form of an oval. A ring of twelve Ionic columns support a two-tiered women's gallery. Originally, the galleries ended one column away from the Torah Ark, they were later extended to the columns beside the ark to provide more seating. The building is domed and lit by a lantern in the center of the dome, in classic Biedermeier style.

A commemorative glass made at the time of the synagogue's dedication and etched with a detailed image of the synagogue's interior is now in the collection of the Jewish Museum (New York).

== Notable members ==
- Adolf Jellinek
- Simon Wiesenthal

== Gallery ==
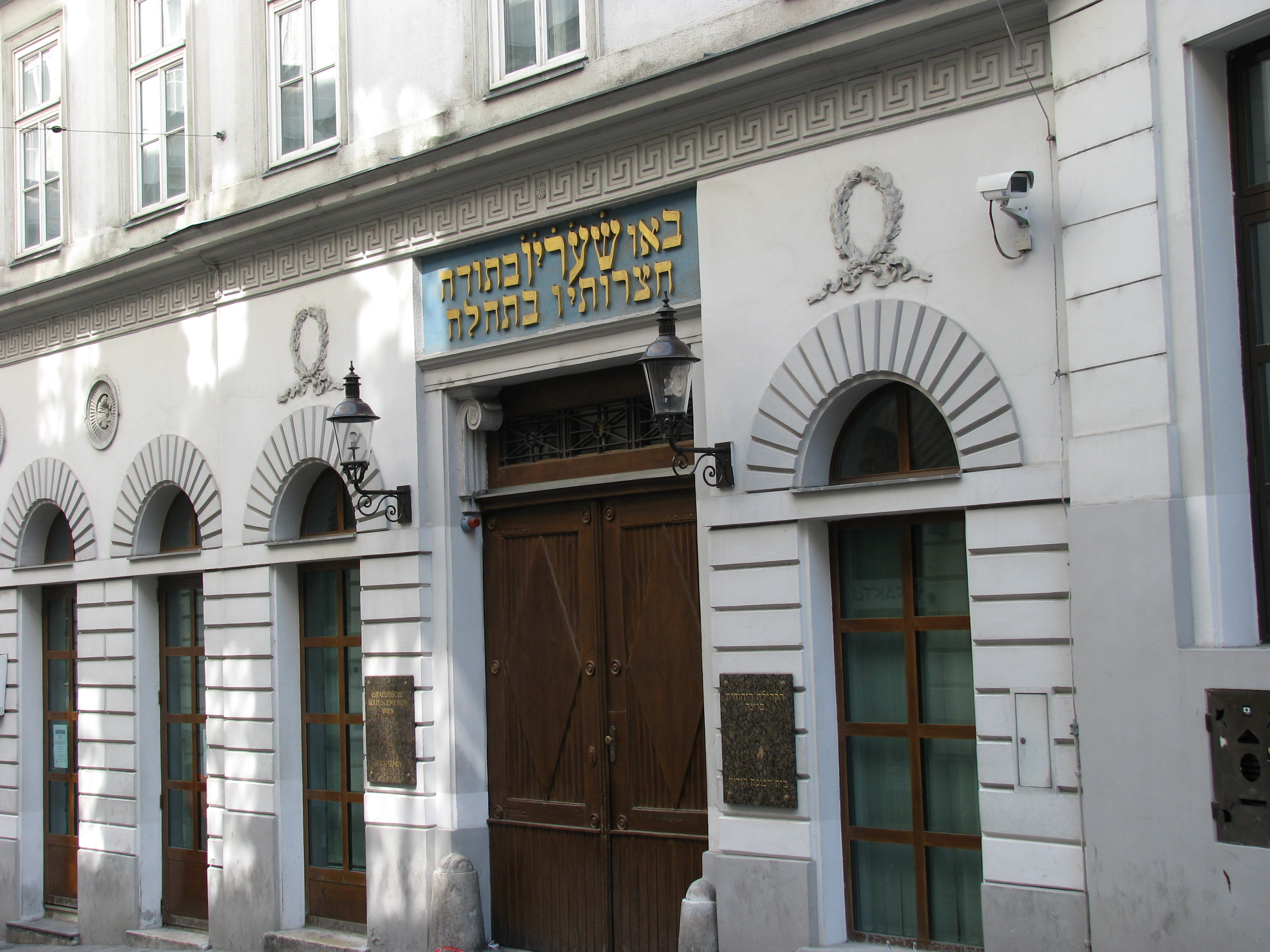
Stadttempel façade and front entrance

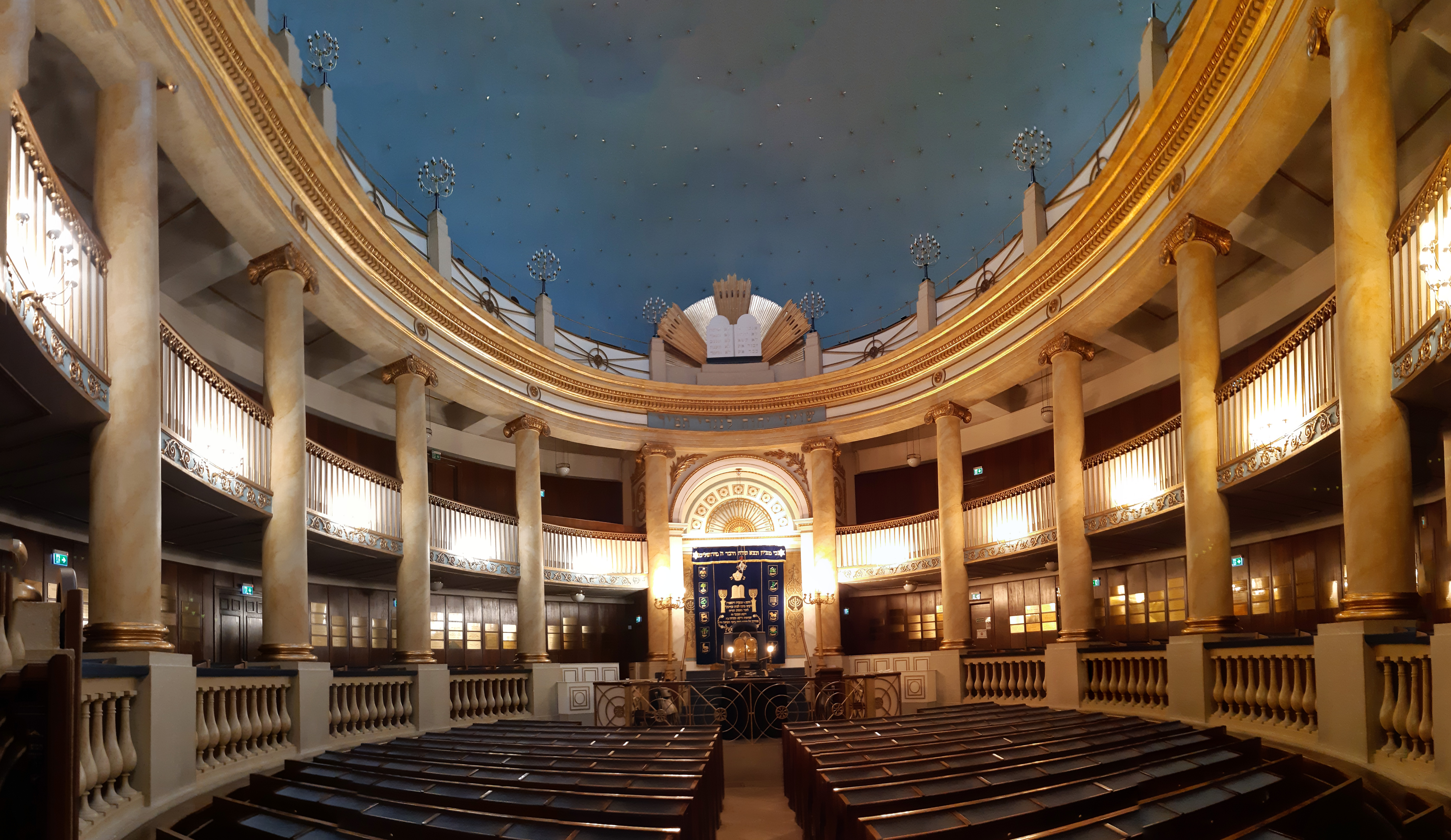
Stadttempel interior

== See also ==
- History of the Jews in Vienna
- Leopoldstädter Tempel
