= Mautern in Steiermark =

- Municipality
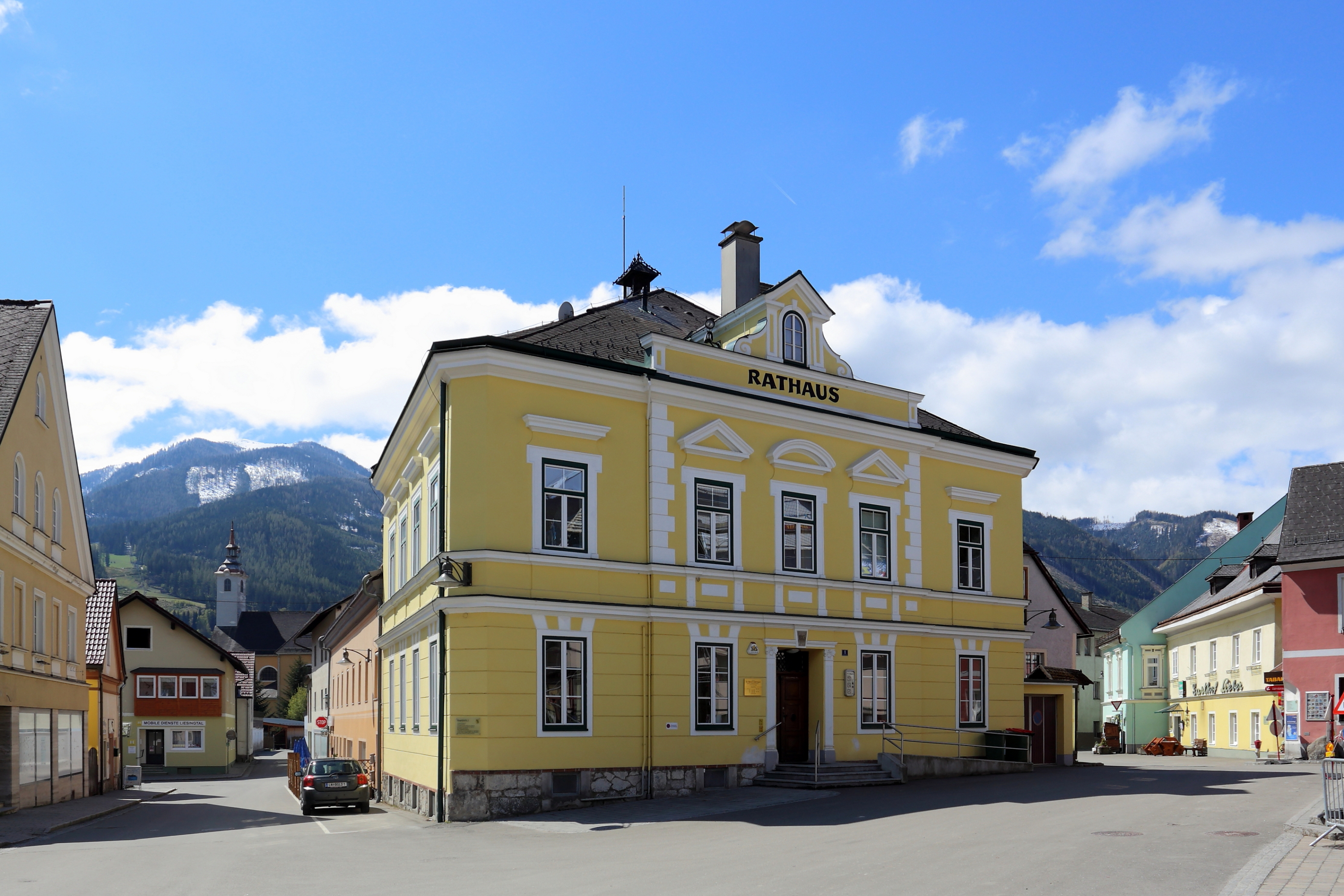
- Town hall

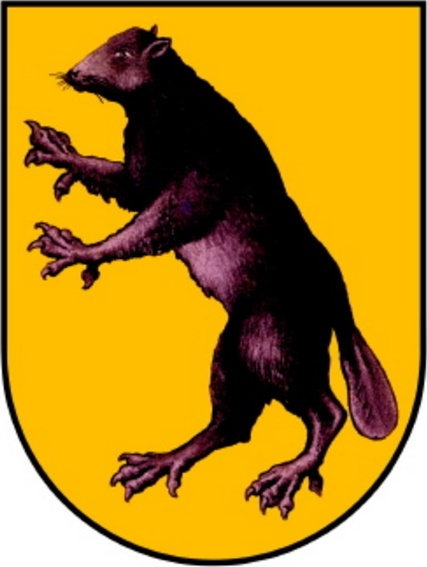
- Coat of arms

- Location within Austria
- Coordinates: 47°24′00″N 14°50′00″E
- Country: Austria
- State: Styria
- District: Leoben

Government
  - Mayor: Andreas Kühberger (ÖVP)

Area
  - Total: 108.7 km^{2} (42.0 sq mi)
- Elevation: 713 m (2,339 ft)

Population (2018-01-01)
  - Total: 1,766
  - Density: 16.25/km^{2} (42.08/sq mi)
- Time zone: UTC+1 (CET)
  - Summer (DST): UTC+2 (CEST)
- Postal code: 8774
- Area code: 03845
- Vehicle registration: LN
- Website: https://www.mautern.com/

Mautern in Steiermark is a municipality in the district of Leoben in Styria, Austria.

== Twin towns ==
Mautern in Steiermark is twinned with:

- Mautern an der Donau, Austria (1983)
- (Republic of Ireland) Tipperary, Ireland (2006)
