= Wolfgang Moitzi =

Austrian politician (born 1984)

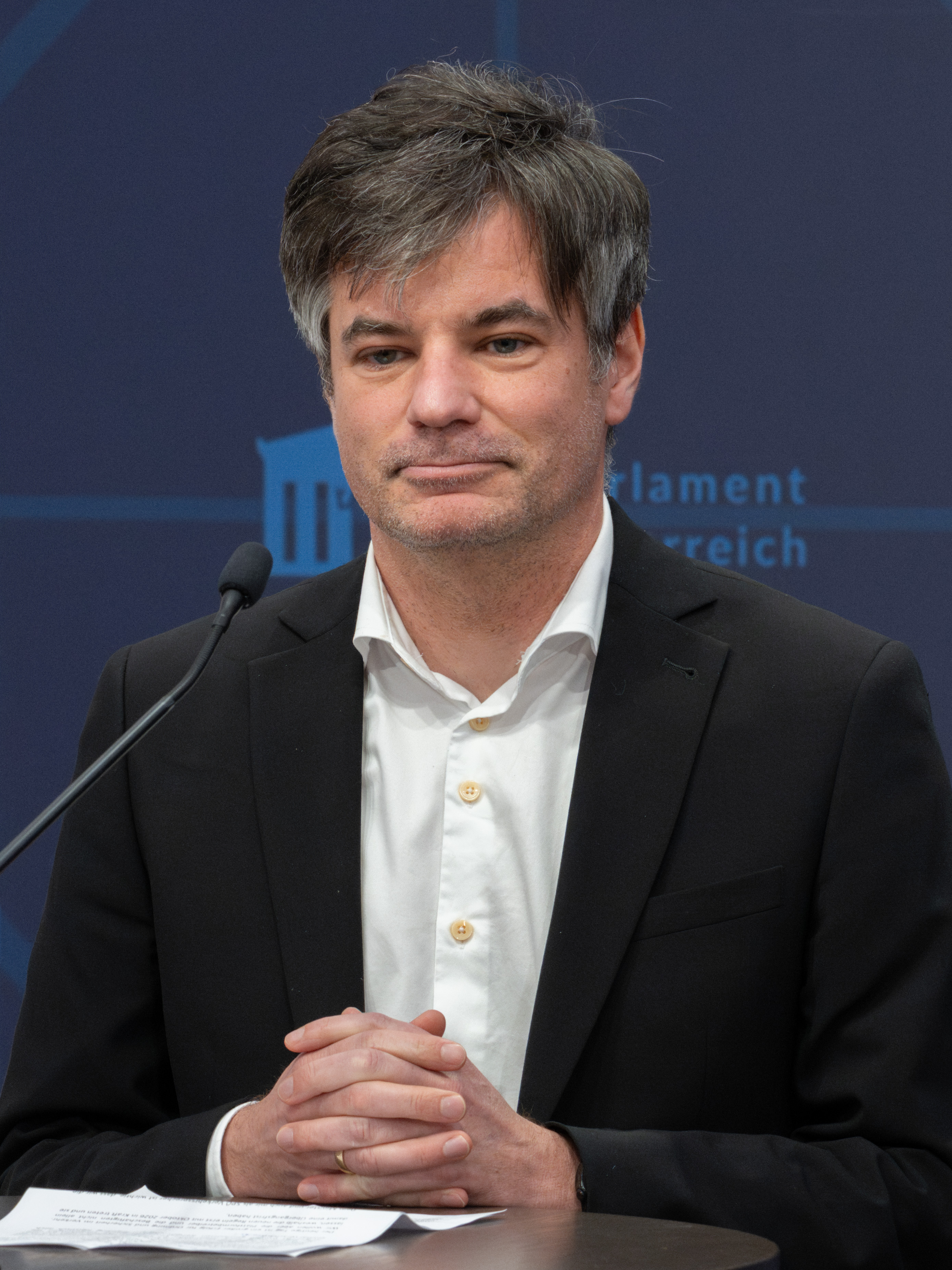
- Moitzi in 2026

Member of the National Council
- Incumbent
- Assumed office 24 October 2024

Chair of the Socialist Youth Austria
- In office 1 November 2008 – 3 May 2014
- Preceded by: Torsten Engelage
- Succeeded by: Julia Herr

Personal details
- Born: 1 August 1984 (age 41)
- Party: Social Democratic Party
- Website: Official website

Wolfgang Moitzi (born 1 August 1984) is an Austrian politician of the Social Democratic Party of Austria (SPÖ). He was elected member of the National Council in the 2024 legislative election, and served as chairperson of the Socialist Youth Austria (SJÖ) from 2007 to 2014. Moitzi had already assumed the role of acting chairperson in the fall of 2007 before being officially elected on 1 November 2008.
