= Heinz Nittel =

Austrian politician (1931–1981)

Heinz Nittel (1931–1981) was a leader of the Austrian Socialist Party (SPÖ) and Chairman of the Socialist Youth Austria (SJÖ). Additionally, he served as the president of the Austrian-Israeli Friendship League and co-founder of the Jewish Welcome Service Vienna. He was shot dead on 1 May 1981 outside his home in Vienna by Hesham Mohammed Rajeh, a 21-year-old Palestinian born in Iraq. Rajeh was also indicted for the 1981 Vienna synagogue attack.

The Abu Nidal Organization terrorist Bahij Muhammad Younis was sentenced to life imprisonment for the murder.
