= Graz =

Capital of Styria, Austria

- Statutory city
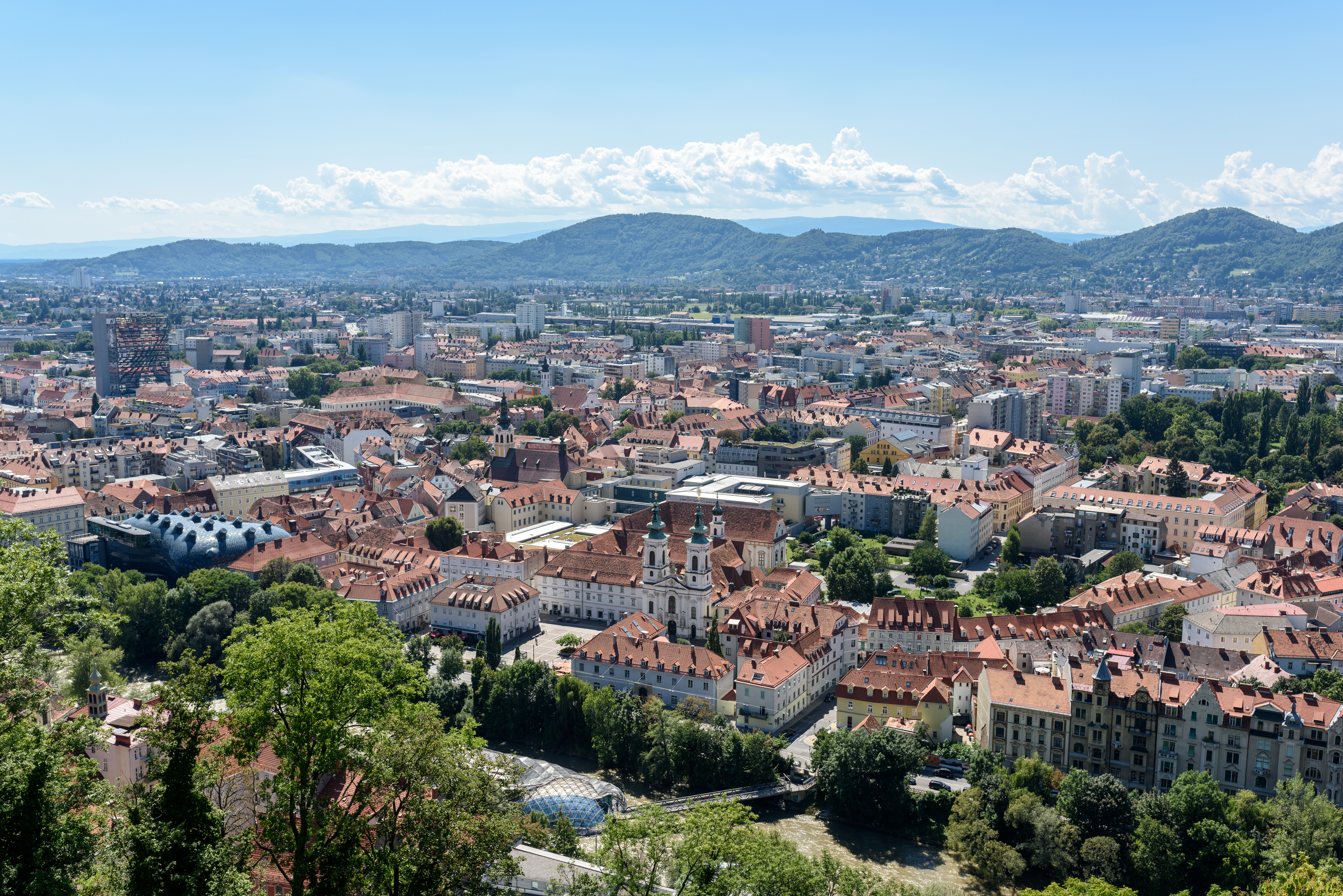
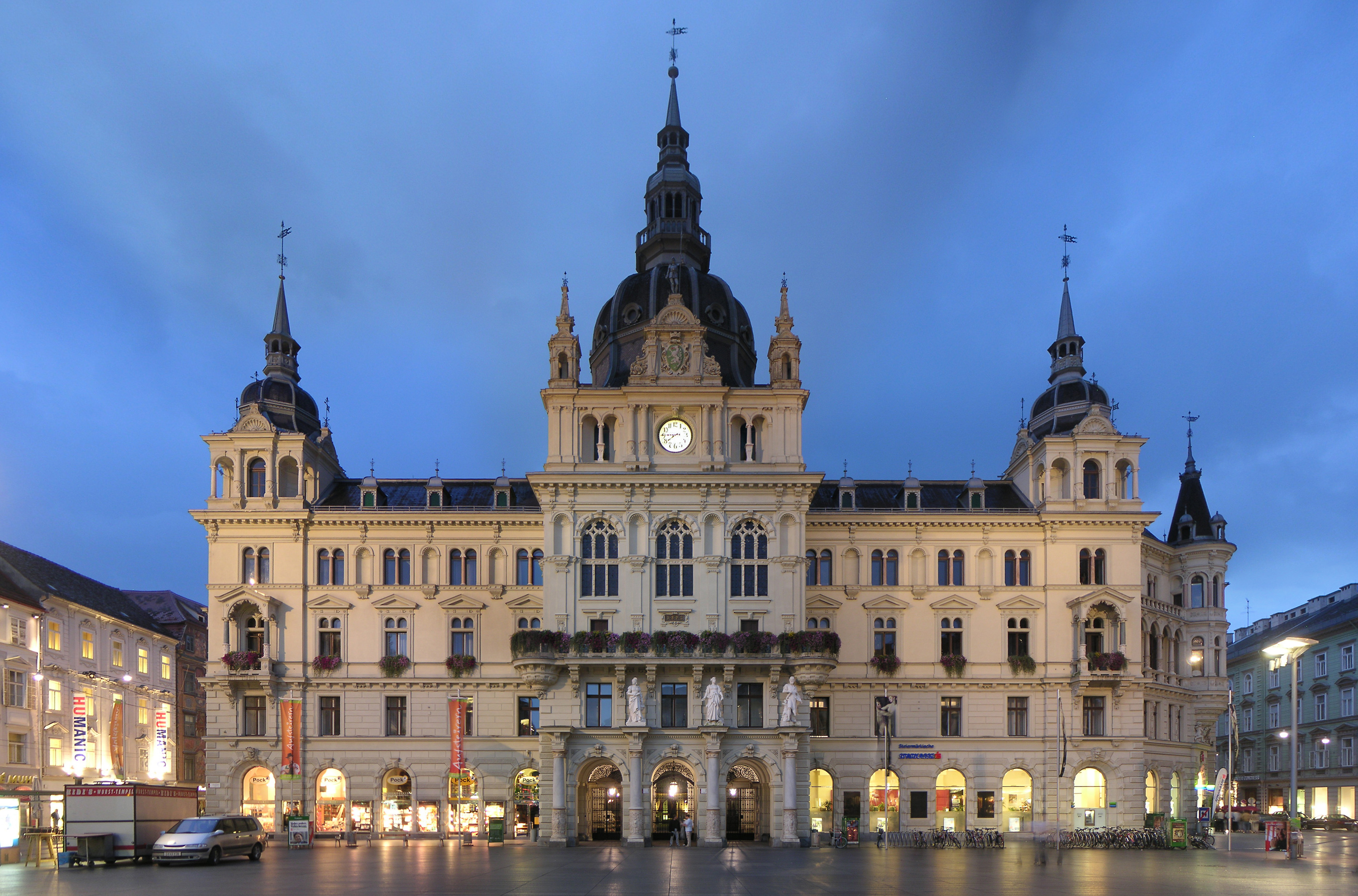
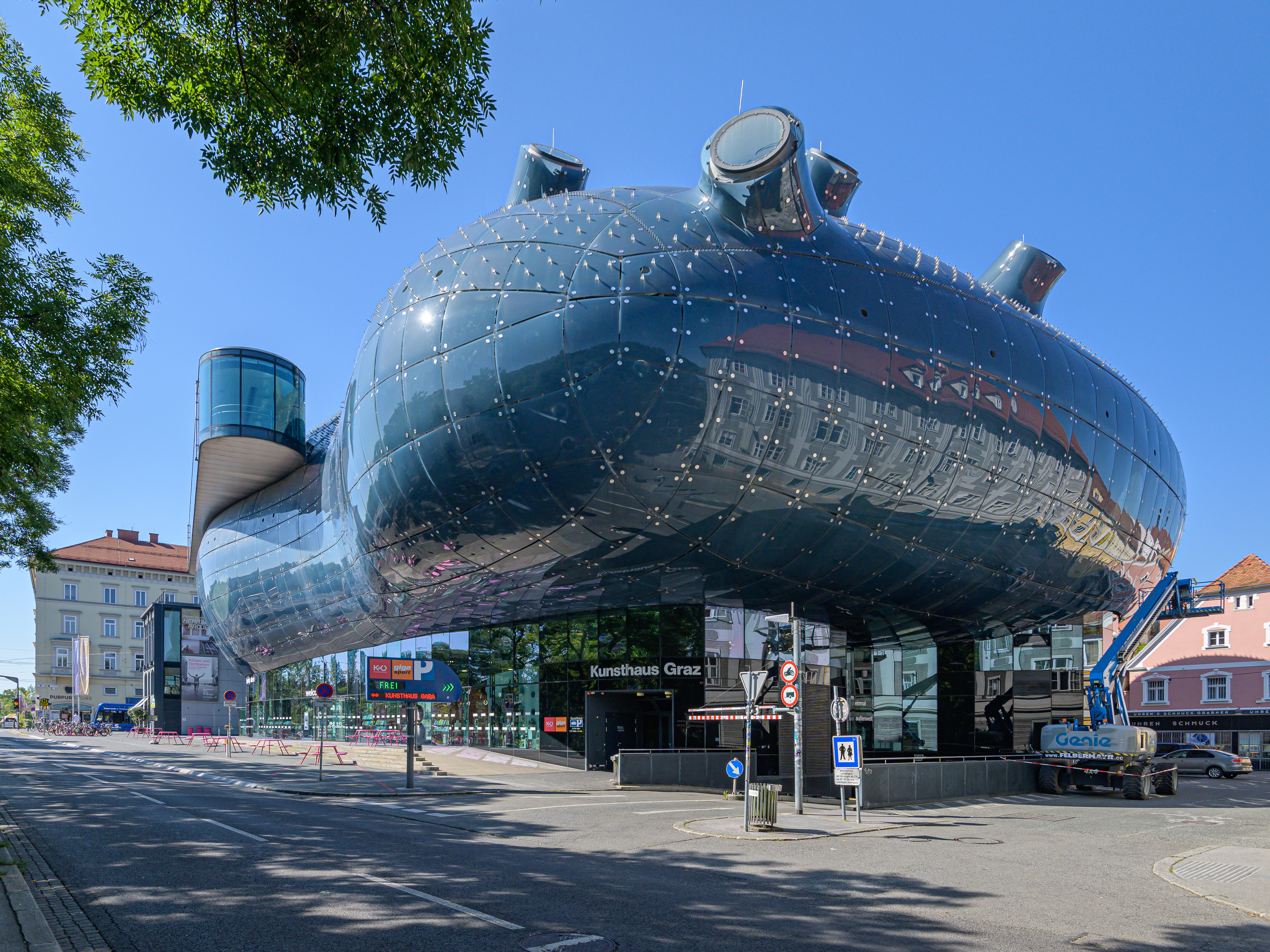
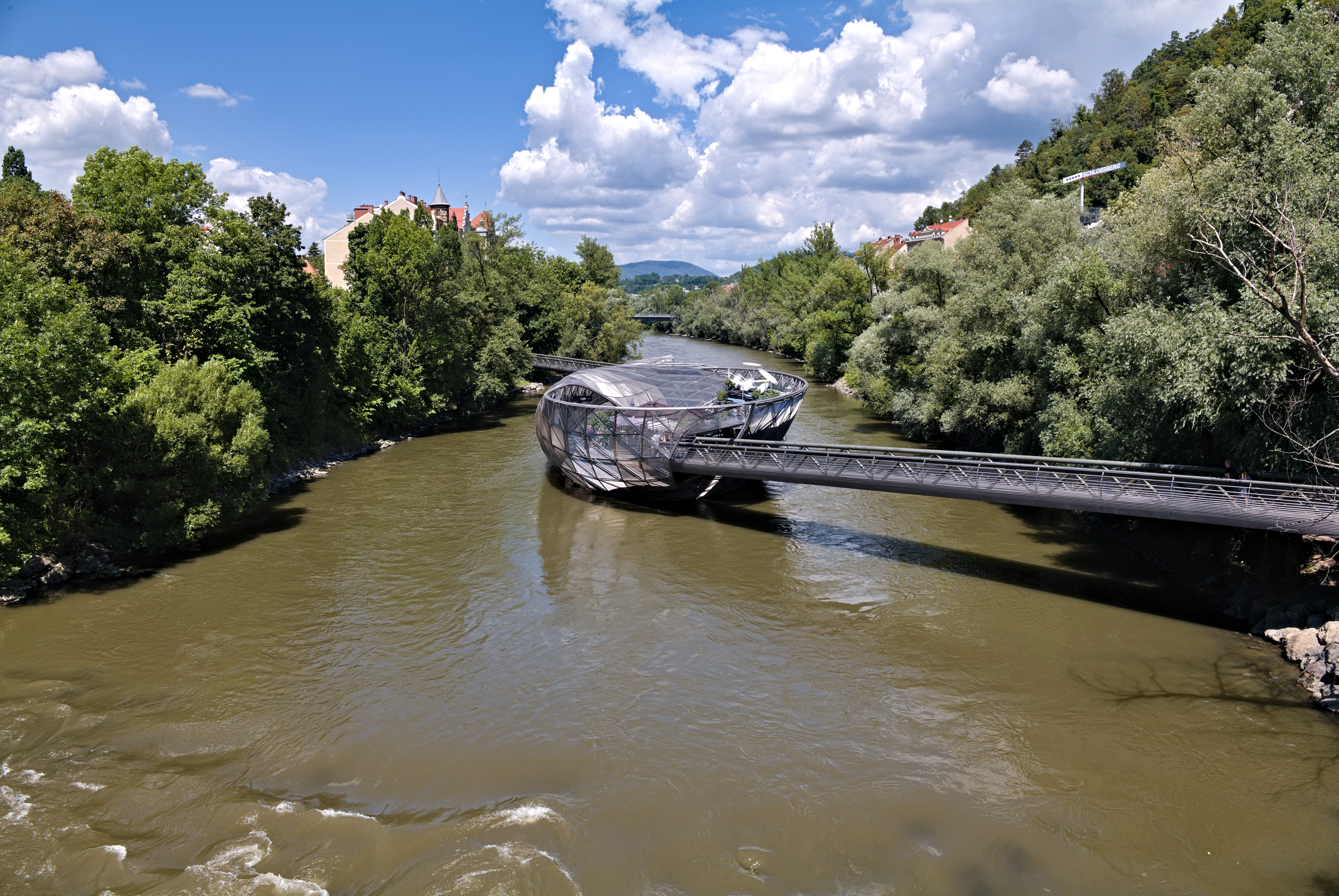
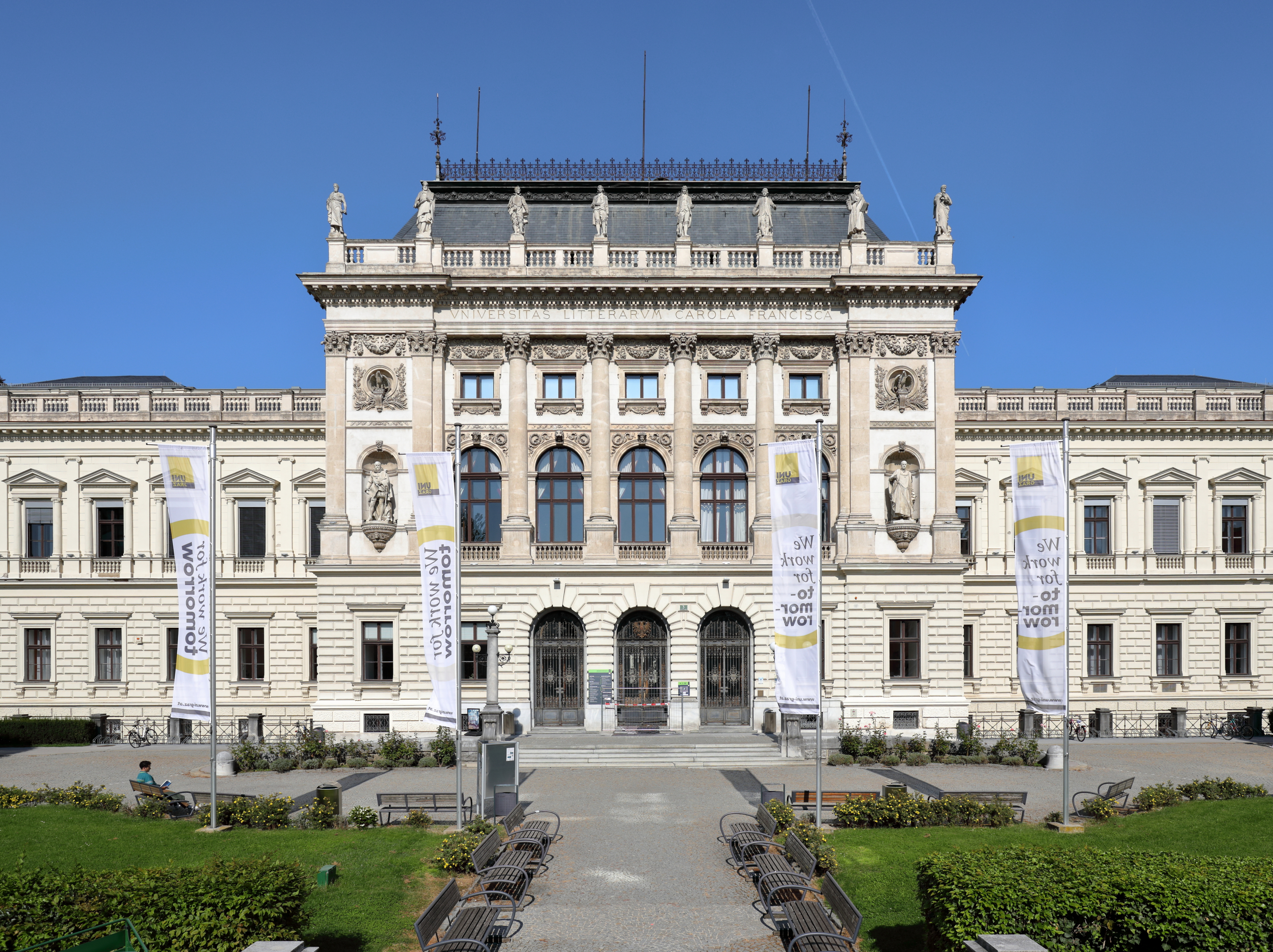
- View from the Castle Hill (Schlossberg) Graz City Hall Graz Museum of Contemporary Art Island in the Mur University of Graz

- Flag Coat of arms Logo

- Location within Styria Graz (Austria)
- Coordinates: 47°04′15″N 15°26′19″E
- Country: Austria
- State: Styria
- District: Statutory city

Government
  - Mayor: Elke Kahr (KPÖ)

Area
  - Total: 127.57 km^{2} (49.26 sq mi)
- Elevation: 353 m (1,158 ft)

Population (1 January 2025)
  - Total: 306,068
  - Density: 2,399.2/km^{2} (6,213.9/sq mi)
- Demonym(s): Grazer (en); Grazer (m.); Grazerin (f.) (de)
- Time zone: UTC+1 (CET)
  - Summer (DST): UTC+2 (CEST)
- Postal code: A-801x, A-802x, A-803x, A-804x, A-805x
- Area code: +43 316
- Vehicle registration: G
- Website: graz.at

UNESCO World Heritage Site
- Official name: City of Graz – Historic Centre and Schloss Eggenberg
- Criteria: Cultural: ii, iv
- Reference: 931
- Inscription: 1999 (23rd Session)
- Extensions: 2010

Graz (German: [ɡraːts]) is the capital of the Austrian state of Styria and the second-largest city in Austria, after Vienna. On 1 January 2026, Graz had a population of around 307,912 to 345,391 including residents with a secondary residence. In 2023, the population of the Graz functional urban area was 660,238. The city is an important centre of higher education, with four universities and four other higher education institutions; together, they had more than 63,000 students as of 10 June 2023. Its historic centre (Altstadt) is considered one of the best-preserved urban centres in Central Europe.

The earliest documented mention of Graz dates from the 12th century, when it developed as a fortified settlement under the rule of the Babenbergs. During the Late Middle Ages, the city became an important commercial and administrative centre. From the 14th century onward, it served as the residence of the Inner Austrian branch of the Habsburg dynasty, a role that contributed to its political, cultural and architectural development. Many Renaissance and Baroque buildings from this period remain part of the cityscape. Graz also held strategic military importance as a stronghold against the Ottoman Empire, particularly through the fortifications on the Schlossberg. In the 19th and 20th centuries, industrialisation and urban growth helped establish Graz as a major industrial, educational and cultural centre in southern Austria.

In 1999, the historic centre of Graz was added to the UNESCO list of World Heritage Sites; in 2010, the designation was expanded to include Eggenberg Palace (German: Schloss Eggenberg) on the western edge of the city. Graz was designated the European Capital of Culture in 2003 and became a City of Culinary Delights in 2008. It is also recognised as a City of Design within UNESCO's Creative Cities Network.

== Etymology ==
The name of the city, Graz, formerly spelled Gratz and also formerly known as Grätz, most likely derives from Slavic gradec/gradac 'small castle'. Some archaeological finds point to the erection of a small castle by Alpine Slavic people, who settled in the region after the barbarian invasions drove out the original Celts, as well as the Romans. In Slovene, gradec still means 'small castle', a hypocoristic derivative of Proto-West-South Slavic *gradьcъ, which descends via liquid metathesis from Common Slavic *gordьcъ and via the Slavic third palatalization from Proto-Slavic *gardiku, originally denoting 'small town, settlement'. The name thus follows the common South Slavic pattern for naming settlements grad. Despite the Slavic root of the name, however, the city of Graz was founded by Bavarian settlers who arrived shortly after the Slavs, with whom they intermixed. The city's name first appears in records in 1128; a record of Grez from 1091 is disputed.

== History ==
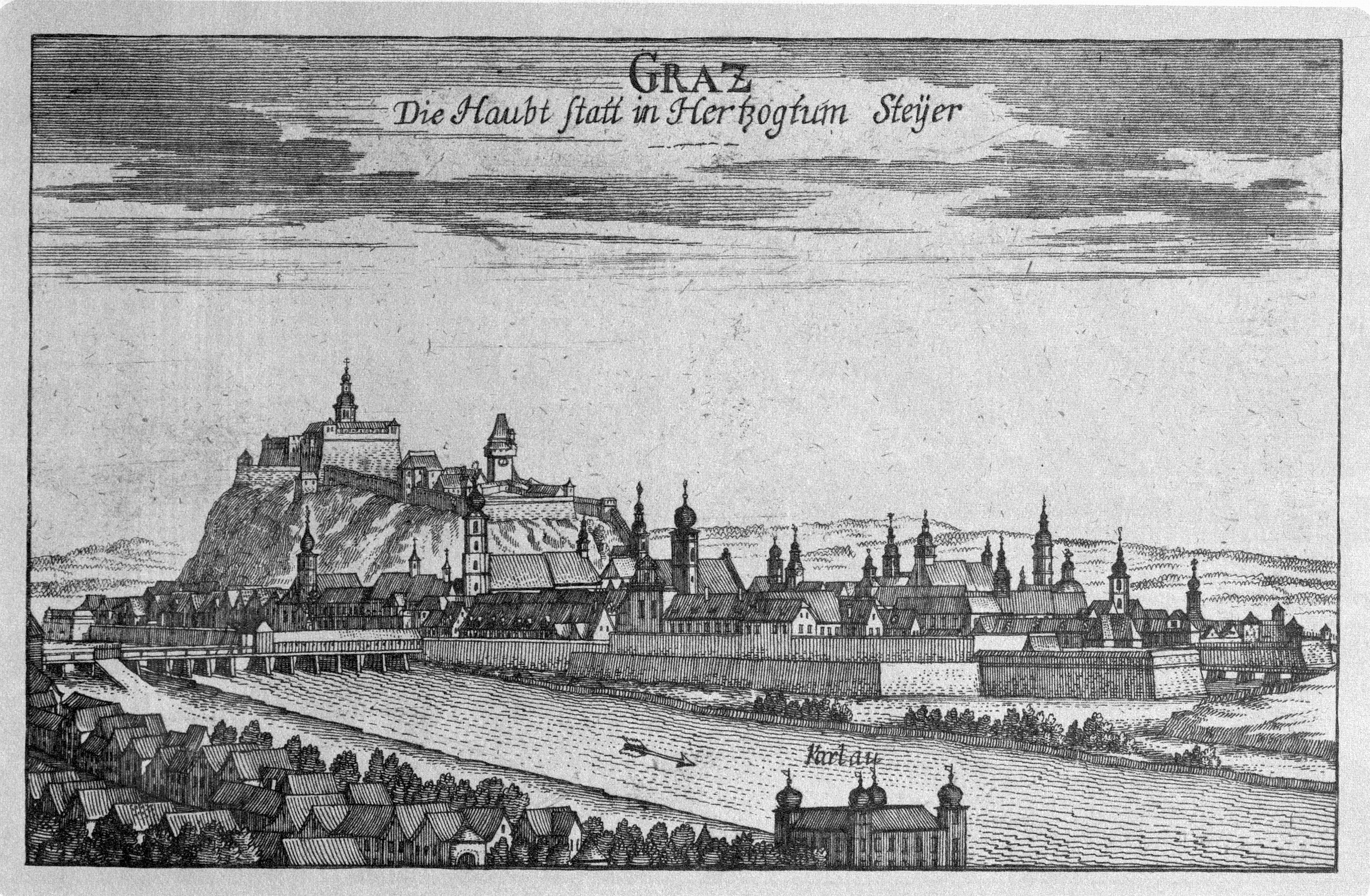
Graz, Georg Matthäus Vischer (1670)

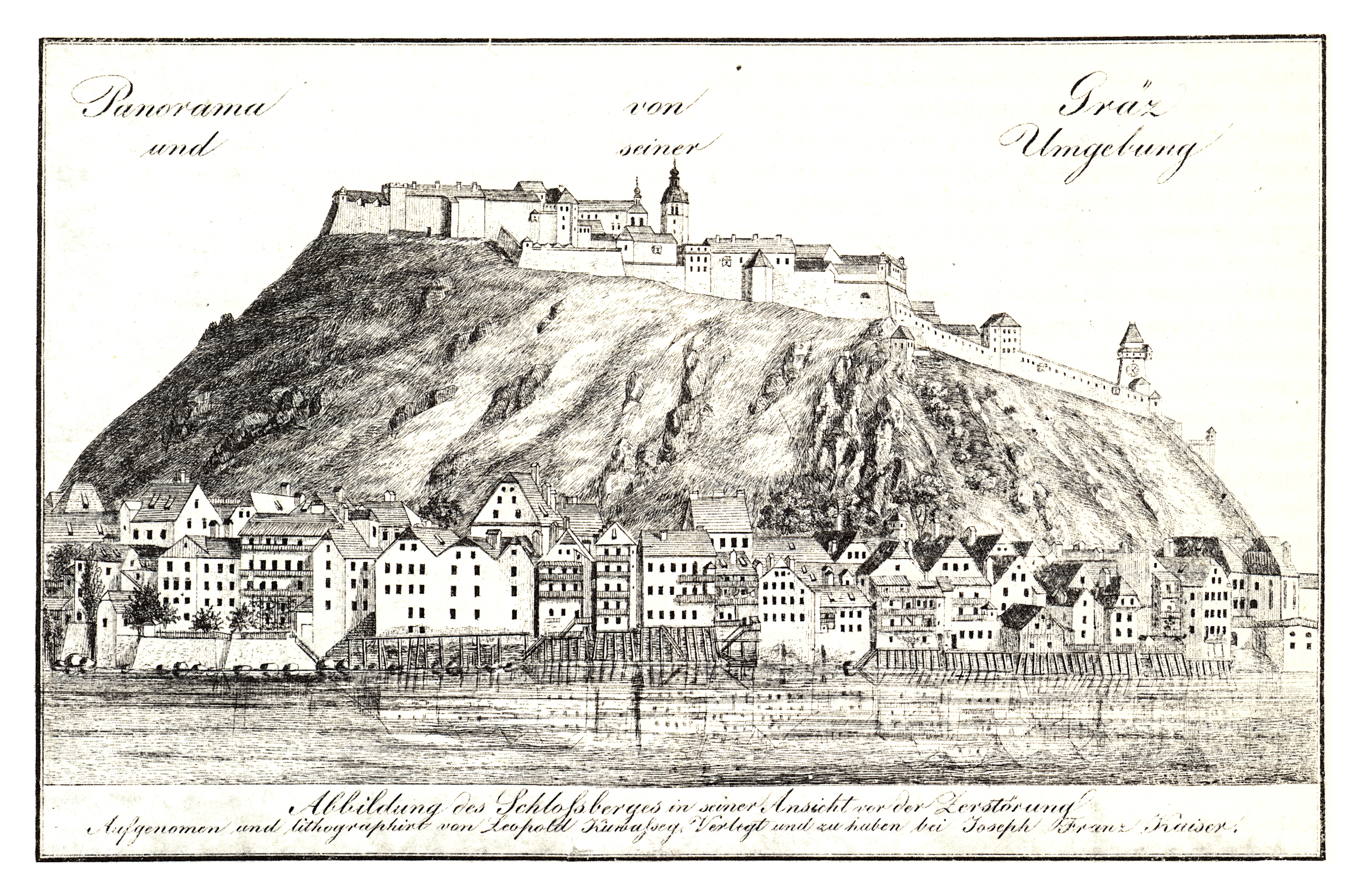
Graz, 1830 – Lith. J.F. Kaiser

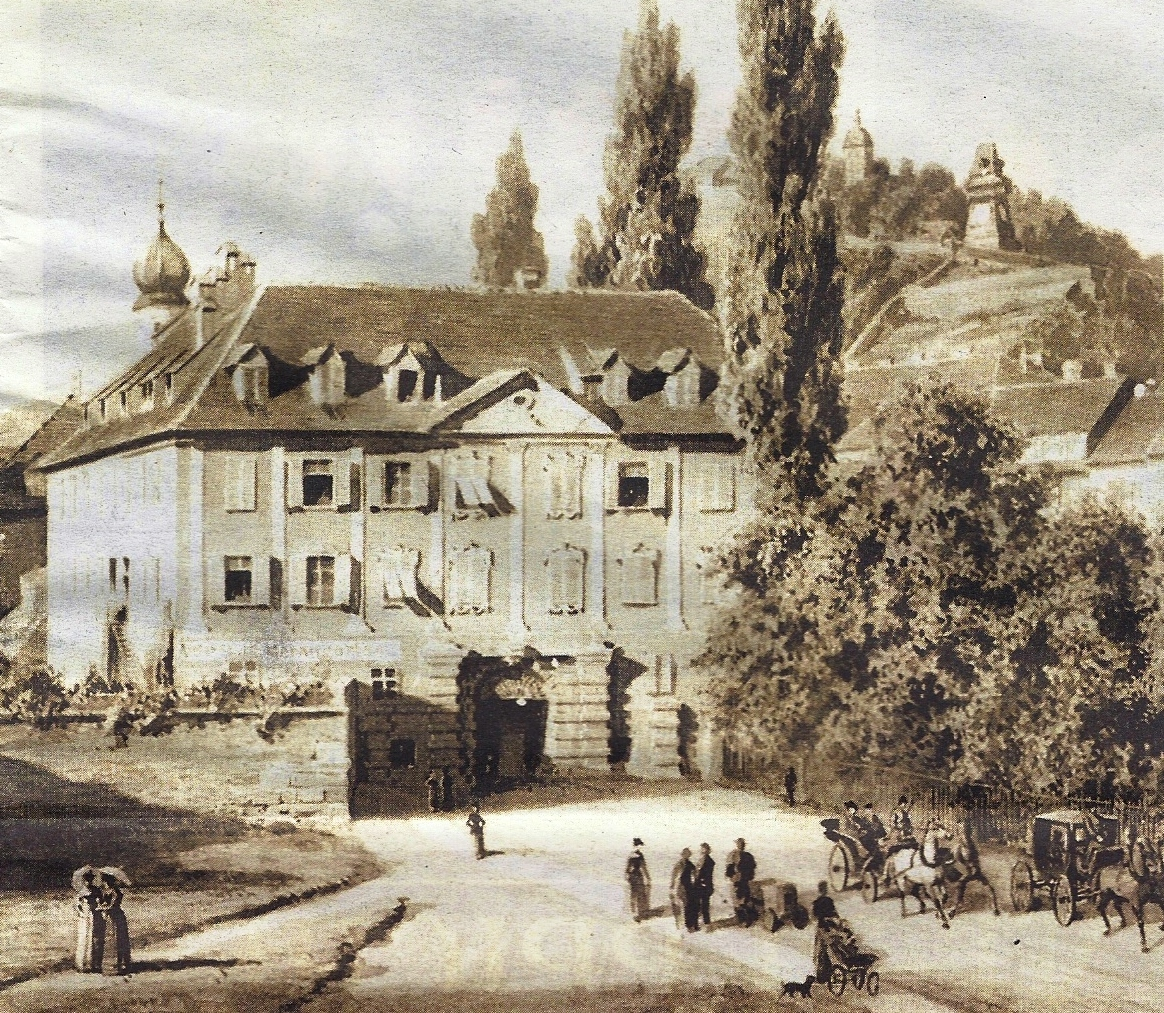
Neutor in 1883

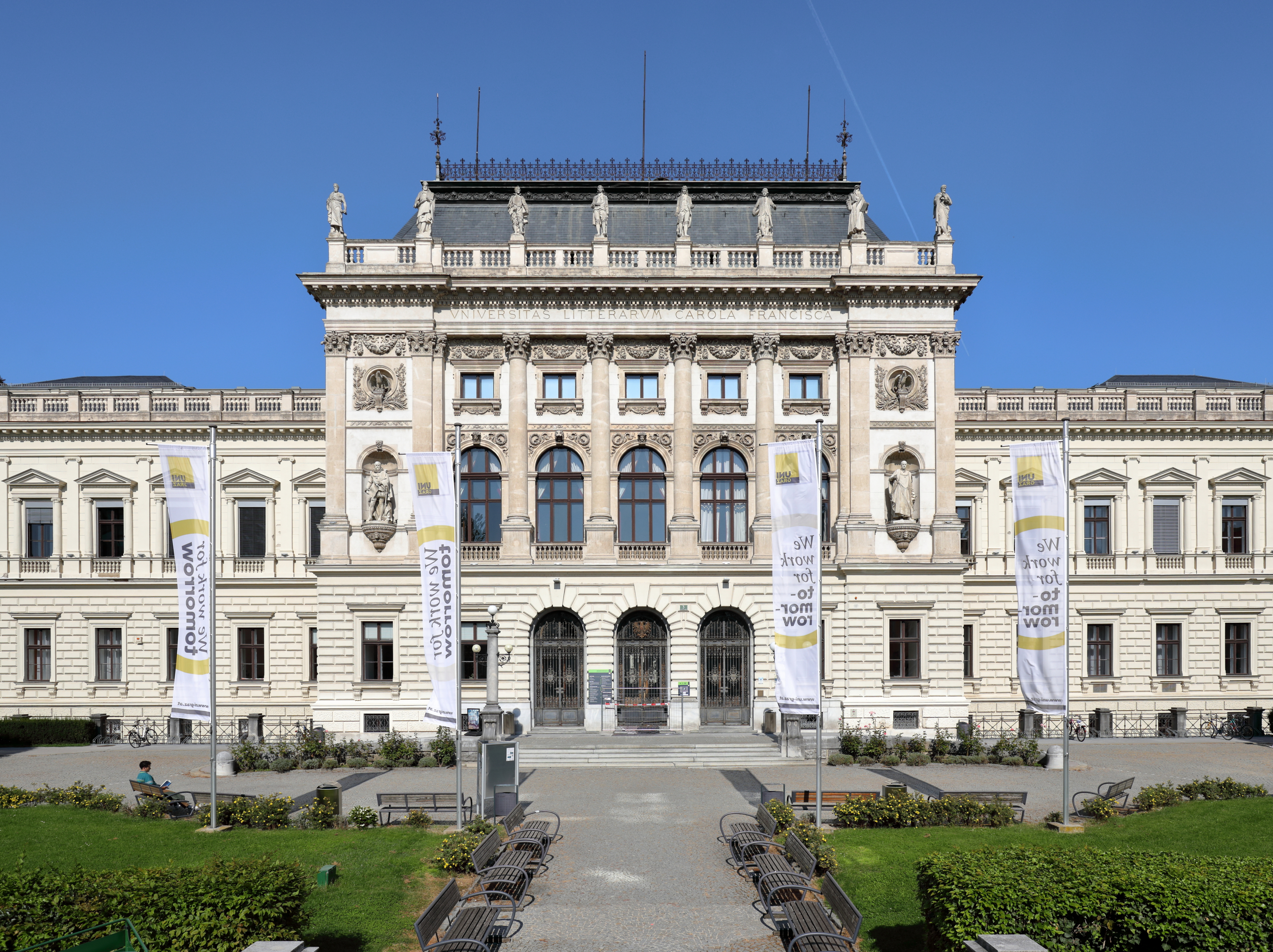
University of Graz

The oldest settlement on the ground of the modern city of Graz dates back to the Copper Age. However, no historical continuity exists of a settlement before the Middle Ages. The city was originally called "Bayrischgraz" or "Bavarian Graz" (i.e. German Graz) by the German founders to distinguish it from the elder "Windischgraz" or "Slovenian Graz". Bavarian Graz, however, soon eclipsed its Slovenian counterpart and henceforth Graz always referred to the German one.

During the 12th century, dukes under Babenberg rule made the town into an important commercial center. Later, Graz came under the rule of the Habsburgs and, in 1281, gained special privileges from King Rudolph I. In the 14th century, Graz became the city of residence of the Inner Austrian line of the Habsburgs. The royalty lived in the Schlossberg castle and from there ruled Styria, Carinthia, most of today's Slovenia, and parts of Italy (Carniola, Gorizia and Gradisca, Trieste). In the 16th century, the city's design and planning were primarily controlled by Italian Renaissance architects and artists. One of the most famous buildings representative of this style is the Landhaus, designed by Domenico dell'Allio, and used by the local rulers as a governmental headquarters.

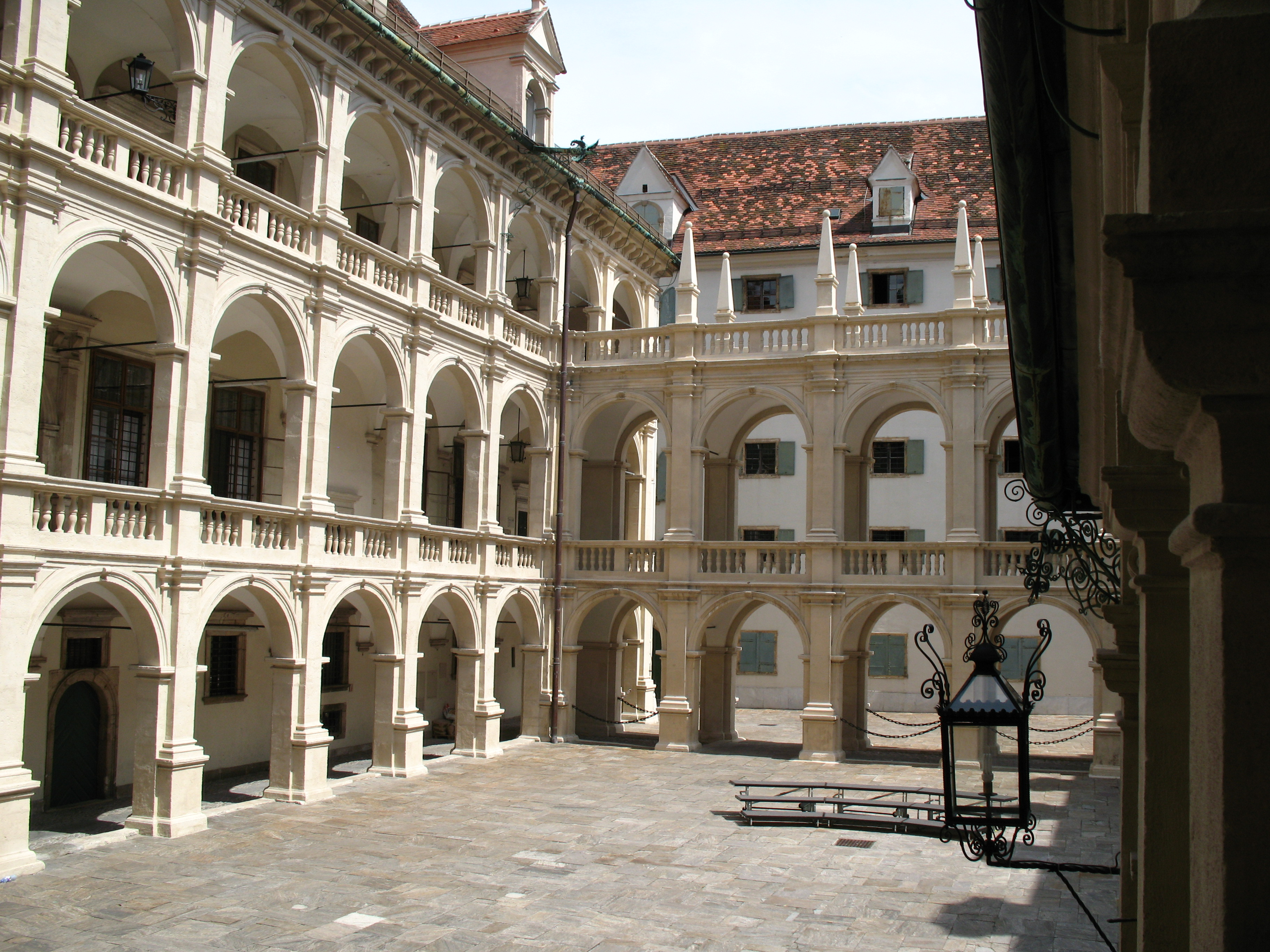
Federal State Parliament (Landhaus)

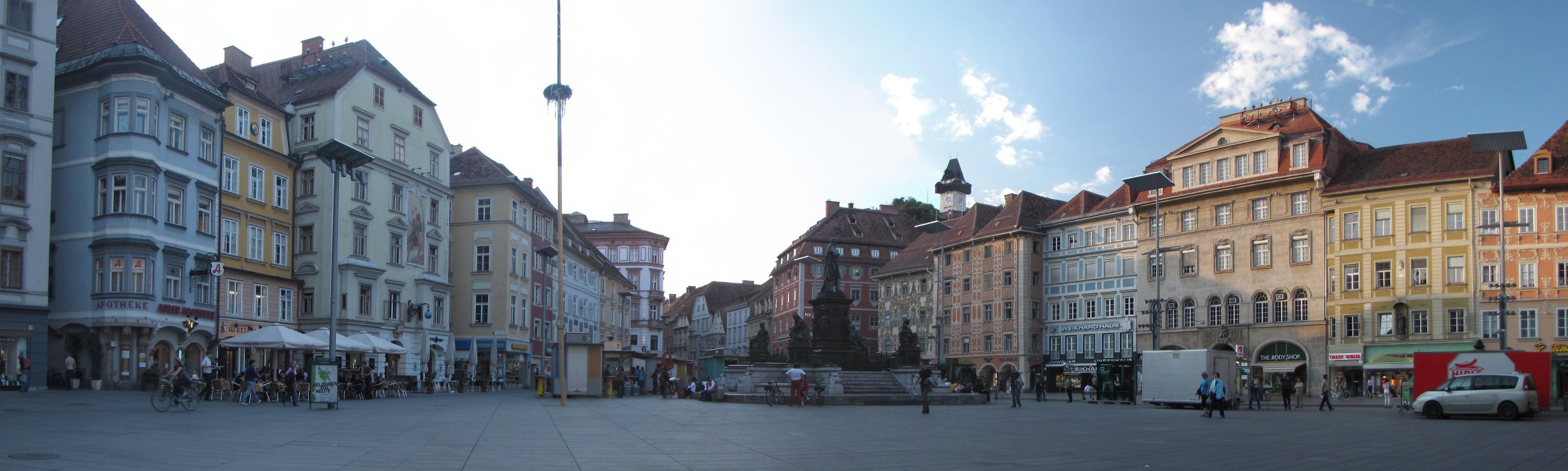
Main Square (Hauptplatz)

The University of Graz was founded by Archduke Karl II in 1585, it is the city's oldest university. For most of its existence, it was controlled by the Catholic Church, and was closed in 1782 by Joseph II in an attempt to gain state control over educational institutions. Joseph II transformed it into a lyceum where civil servants and medical personnel were trained. In 1827 it was re-established as a university by Emperor Franz I, and was named 'Karl-Franzens Universität' or 'Charles-Francis University' in English. Almost 30,000 students are currently enrolled at this university as of 2025.

Astronomer Johannes Kepler lived in Graz for a short period beginning in 1594. He worked as district mathematician and taught at the Lutheran school, but still found time to study astronomy. He left Graz for Prague in 1600 when Protestants were banned from the city. Ludwig Boltzmann was Professor for Mathematical Physics from 1869 to 1890. During that time, Nikola Tesla studied electrical engineering at the Polytechnic in 1875. Nobel laureate Otto Loewi taught at the University of Graz from 1909 until 1938. Ivo Andrić, the 1961 Nobel Prize for Literature laureate obtained his doctorate at the University of Graz. Erwin Schrödinger was briefly chancellor of the University of Graz in 1936.

Graz is centrally located within today's state (Land) of Styria, or Steiermark in German. Mark is an old German word indicating a large area of land used as a defensive border, in which the peasantry is taught how to organize and fight in the case of an invasion. With a strategic location at the head of the open and fertile Mur valley, Graz was historically a target of invaders, such as the Hungarians under Matthias Corvinus in 1481, and the Ottoman Turks in 1529 and 1532. Apart from the Riegersburg Castle, the Schlossberg was the only fortification in the region that never fell to the Ottoman Turks. Graz is home to the region's provincial armory, which is the world's largest historical collection of late medieval and Renaissance weaponry. It has been preserved since 1551, and displays over 30,000 items.

From the earlier part of the 15th century, Graz was the residence of the younger branch of the Habsburgs, which succeeded to the imperial throne in 1619 in the person of Emperor Ferdinand II, who moved the capital to Vienna. New fortifications were built on the Schlossberg at the end of the 16th century. Napoleon's army occupied Graz in 1797 and, in 1809 the city withstood another assault by the French army. During this attack, the commanding officer in the fortress was ordered to defend it with about 900 men against Napoleon's army of about 3,000. He successfully defended the Schlossberg against eight attacks, but they were forced to give up after the Grande Armée occupied Vienna and the Emperor ordered to surrender. Following the defeat of Austria by Napoleonic forces at the Battle of Wagram in 1809, the fortifications were demolished using explosives, as stipulated in the Peace of Schönbrunn of the same year. The belltower (Glockenturm) and the civic clock tower (Uhrturm), which is a leading tourist attraction and serves as a symbol for Graz, were spared after the citizens of Graz paid a ransom for their preservation.

Archduke Karl II of Inner Austria had 20,000 Protestant books burned in the square of what is now a mental hospital, and succeeded in returning Styria to the authority of the Holy See. Archduke Franz Ferdinand was born in Graz in what is now the Stadtmuseum (city museum). On 2 April 1945, while the heaviest Allied bomb raid of Graz occurred, the Gestapo and Waffen-SS committed a massacre against resistance fighters, Hungarian-Jewish forced laborers, and POWs at the SS barracks at Graz-Wetzelsdorf.

== Geography ==
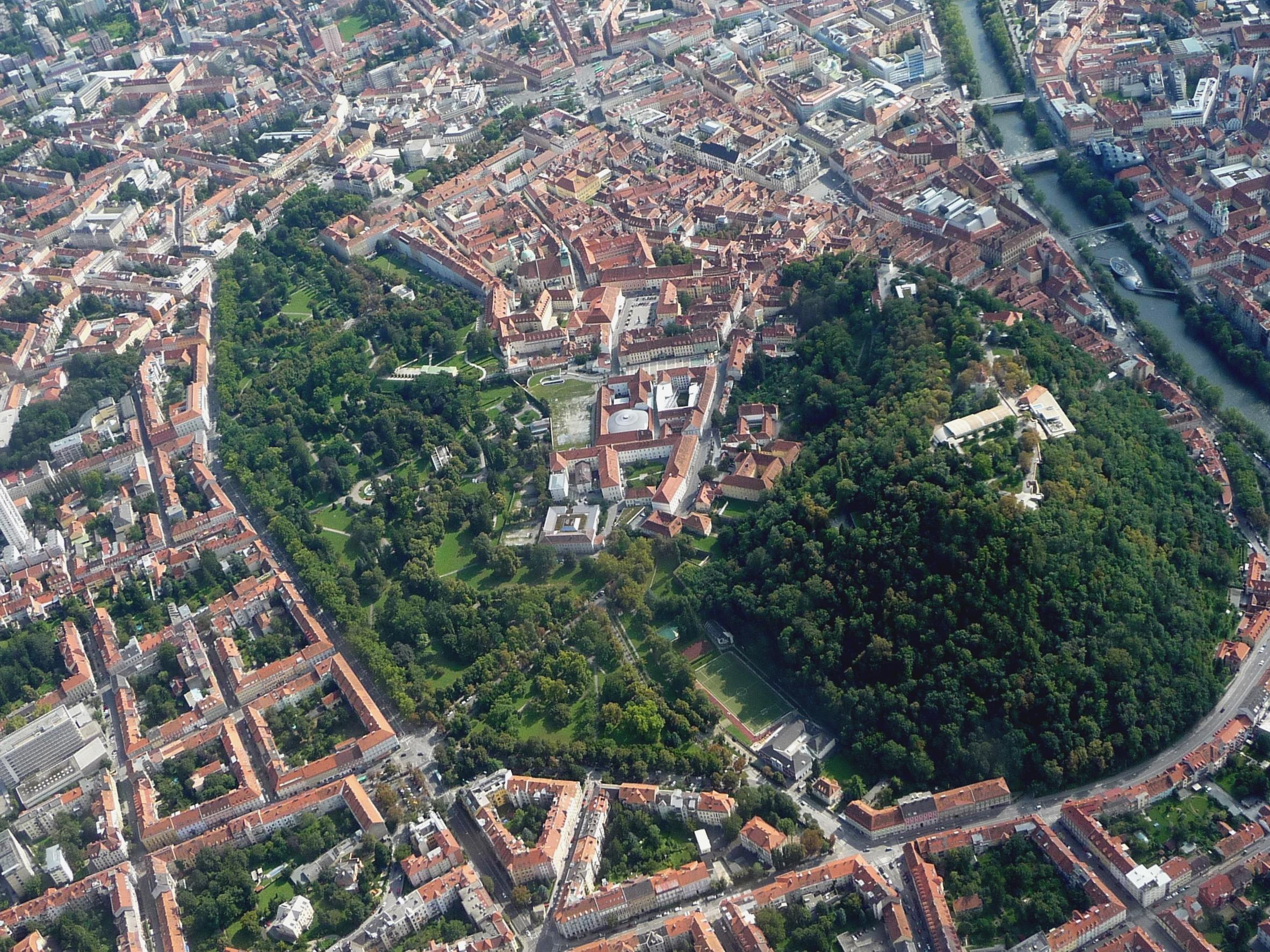
Aerial photograph showing the historic centre of Graz

Graz is situated on both sides of the river Mur in southeast Austria. It is about 150 km (93 mi) southwest of Vienna (Wien). The nearest larger urban centre is Maribor (Marburg) in Slovenia, which is about 50 km (31 mi) to the south. Graz is the capital of Styria and the largest city in the federal state, a green and heavily forested region on the eastern edge of the Alps. It is located in the Graz Basin and surrounded by mountains and hills to the north, east and west. The city centre sits at an elevation of 353 m (1,158 ft), the highest point is Plabutsch mountain with 754 m (2,474 ft) at the western border. The mountain Schöckl is just a few kilometres to the north and surmounts the city by 1,100 m (3,600 ft).

=== Climate ===
According to the Köppen climate classification, Graz has an oceanic climate (Cfb) or humid continental climate (Dfb) depending on the isotherm and station used. Wladimir Köppen himself was in town and conducted studies to see how the climate of the past influenced the Continental Drift theory. Due to its position southeast of the Alps, Graz is shielded from the prevailing westerly winds that bring weather fronts in from the North Atlantic to northwestern and central Europe. The weather in Graz is thus influenced by the Mediterranean, and it has more hours of sunshine per year than Vienna or Salzburg and also less wind or rain. Graz lies in a basin that is only open to the south, causing the climate to be warmer than would be expected at that latitude. Plants are found in Graz that normally grow much further south.

- average temperatures: Graz Airport 8.7 °C (48 °F) / Karl-Franzens University 9.4 °C (49 °F)
- average rainfall: 818 mm (32 in) with on average 92 days of rain (Karl Franzens University)
- average hours of sunshine: 1,989 (Karl Franzens University)

Climate data for Graz (Karl-Franzens University) 1991–2020, extremes 1961–2020
Month	Jan	Feb	Mar	Apr	May	Jun	Jul	Aug	Sep	Oct	Nov	Dec	Year
Record high °C (°F)	21.0 (69.8)	22.8 (73.0)	25.1 (77.2)	28.8 (83.8)	34.1 (93.4)	37.2 (99.0)	38.1 (100.6)	38.1 (100.6)	32.0 (89.6)	27.2 (81.0)	23.0 (73.4)	19.2 (66.6)	38.1 (100.6)
Mean maximum °C (°F)	12.4 (54.3)	14.8 (58.6)	20.3 (68.5)	24.6 (76.3)	28.5 (83.3)	31.9 (89.4)	33.6 (92.5)	33.1 (91.6)	27.8 (82.0)	22.4 (72.3)	16.2 (61.2)	11.6 (52.9)	34.8 (94.6)
Mean daily maximum °C (°F)	3.9 (39.0)	7.7 (45.9)	11.6 (52.9)	17.2 (63.0)	20.8 (69.4)	25.0 (77.0)	25.9 (78.6)	25.4 (77.7)	21.2 (70.2)	15.3 (59.5)	9.2 (48.6)	4.0 (39.2)	15.6 (60.1)
Daily mean °C (°F)	0.6 (33.1)	2.7 (36.9)	6.8 (44.2)	11.6 (52.9)	15.8 (60.4)	19.4 (66.9)	21.2 (70.2)	20.8 (69.4)	16.1 (61.0)	11.3 (52.3)	6.0 (42.8)	1.1 (34.0)	11.1 (52.0)
Mean daily minimum °C (°F)	−2.8 (27.0)	−1.9 (28.6)	1.7 (35.1)	6.0 (42.8)	9.9 (49.8)	13.9 (57.0)	15.1 (59.2)	14.8 (58.6)	11.1 (52.0)	6.6 (43.9)	2.7 (36.9)	−1.8 (28.8)	6.3 (43.3)
Mean minimum °C (°F)	−11.6 (11.1)	−9.8 (14.4)	−5.3 (22.5)	−0.8 (30.6)	4.1 (39.4)	8.6 (47.5)	10.8 (51.4)	10.4 (50.7)	6.1 (43.0)	0.6 (33.1)	−4.2 (24.4)	−9.4 (15.1)	−13.6 (7.5)
Record low °C (°F)	−19.5 (−3.1)	−19.3 (−2.7)	−17.2 (1.0)	−5.5 (22.1)	−1.3 (29.7)	1.4 (34.5)	6.3 (43.3)	4.9 (40.8)	0.8 (33.4)	−6.4 (20.5)	−10.8 (12.6)	−18.3 (−0.9)	−19.5 (−3.1)
Average precipitation mm (inches)	19.8 (0.78)	28.9 (1.14)	34.6 (1.36)	51.6 (2.03)	93.2 (3.67)	121.3 (4.78)	124.1 (4.89)	128.7 (5.07)	93.8 (3.69)	63.8 (2.51)	54.4 (2.14)	40.0 (1.57)	854.2 (33.63)
Average snowfall cm (inches)	9.1 (3.6)	12.4 (4.9)	5.2 (2.0)	0.5 (0.2)	0.0 (0.0)	0.0 (0.0)	0.0 (0.0)	0.0 (0.0)	0.0 (0.0)	0.3 (0.1)	4.7 (1.9)	13.1 (5.2)	45.3 (17.8)
Average precipitation days (≥ 1.0 mm)	4.3	4.4	5.6	7.7	10.6	11.5	10.6	9.9	8.7	7.3	7.0	5.3	92.9
Average snowy days (≥ 1.0 cm)	11.5	7.8	3.5	0.3	0.0	0.0	0.0	0.0	0.0	0.1	1.6	7.5	32.3
Average relative humidity (%) (at 14:00)	68.7	59.1	53.0	49.6	53.0	54.5	53.4	55.2	58.1	63.0	70.8	73.1	59.3
Mean monthly sunshine hours	102.1	128.6	169.2	193.1	227.0	238.1	253.4	242.8	188.0	149.7	89.1	87.3	2,068.4
Percentage possible sunshine	40.3	49.2	48.3	50.0	50.9	52.5	55.5	58.5	52.7	48.7	35.1	35.8	48.1
Source: Central Institute for Meteorology and Geodynamics

Climate data for Graz Airport (1991–2020, extremes 1971–2020) (Note: Dew Point and Sunshine for 1961-1990 period)
Month	Jan	Feb	Mar	Apr	May	Jun	Jul	Aug	Sep	Oct	Nov	Dec	Year
Record high °C (°F)	21.4 (70.5)	23.0 (73.4)	24.5 (76.1)	28.1 (82.6)	33.6 (92.5)	35.2 (95.4)	38.2 (100.8)	38.4 (101.1)	32.1 (89.8)	27.1 (80.8)	22.9 (73.2)	20.4 (68.7)	38.4 (101.1)
Mean daily maximum °C (°F)	3.1 (37.6)	7.0 (44.6)	11.3 (52.3)	16.8 (62.2)	20.4 (68.7)	24.6 (76.3)	25.6 (78.1)	25.2 (77.4)	20.9 (69.6)	15.1 (59.2)	8.8 (47.8)	3.3 (37.9)	15.2 (59.4)
Daily mean °C (°F)	−1.3 (29.7)	0.9 (33.6)	5.4 (41.7)	10.3 (50.5)	14.9 (58.8)	18.6 (65.5)	20.2 (68.4)	19.8 (67.6)	15.1 (59.2)	10.2 (50.4)	4.7 (40.5)	−0.6 (30.9)	9.9 (49.8)
Mean daily minimum °C (°F)	−5.6 (21.9)	−4.9 (23.2)	−0.8 (30.6)	3.8 (38.8)	8.3 (46.9)	12.5 (54.5)	13.5 (56.3)	13.3 (55.9)	9.4 (48.9)	4.7 (40.5)	0.6 (33.1)	−4.4 (24.1)	4.2 (39.6)
Record low °C (°F)	−26.8 (−16.2)	−24.3 (−11.7)	−20.8 (−5.4)	−6.4 (20.5)	−4.2 (24.4)	1.7 (35.1)	4.5 (40.1)	3.5 (38.3)	−1.9 (28.6)	−8.9 (16.0)	−19.1 (−2.4)	−21.1 (−6.0)	−26.8 (−16.2)
Average precipitation mm (inches)	18.7 (0.74)	28.9 (1.14)	33.8 (1.33)	54.3 (2.14)	88.7 (3.49)	114.1 (4.49)	117.7 (4.63)	125.6 (4.94)	95.5 (3.76)	67.2 (2.65)	55.0 (2.17)	41.6 (1.64)	841.1 (33.11)
Average precipitation days (≥ 1.0 mm)	3.7	4.4	5.0	7.7	10.8	11.2	10.4	9.5	8.2	7.1	6.8	5.4	90.2
Average relative humidity (%) (at 14:00)	72.7	58.2	50.2	46.9	50.3	52.5	51.3	52.8	56.0	62.3	72.6	78.0	58.7
Average dew point °C (°F)	0.2 (32.4)	0.1 (32.2)	0.3 (32.5)	1.7 (35.1)	6.6 (43.9)	9.8 (49.6)	9.6 (49.3)	9.2 (48.6)	3.5 (38.3)	1.0 (33.8)	0.3 (32.5)	0.1 (32.2)	3.5 (38.4)
Mean monthly sunshine hours	63.0	94.0	140.0	162.0	208.0	213.0	239.0	219.0	168.0	135.0	79.0	59.0	1,779
Source 1: Central Institute for Meteorology and Geodynamics
Source 2: NOAA (Dew Point and Sun)

=== Neighbouring municipalities ===
These towns and villages border Graz:

- to the north: Gratkorn, Stattegg, Weinitzen
- to the east: Kainbach bei Graz, Hart bei Graz, Raaba
- to the south: Gössendorf, Feldkirchen bei Graz, Seiersberg
- to the west: Attendorf, Thal, Judendorf-Straßengel

=== Districts ===
Graz is divided into 17 municipal districts (Stadtbezirke):

- I. Innere Stadt (3.314)
- II. St. Leonhard (14.756)
- III. Geidorf (23.847)
- IV. Lend (32.859)
- V. Gries (30.050)
- VI. Jakomini (31.412)
- VII. Liebenau (15.896)
- VIII. St. Peter (16.629)
- IX. Waltendorf (12.158)
- X. Ries (6.144)
- XI. Mariatrost (9.998)
- XII. Andritz (19.415)
- XIII. Gösting (11.129)
- XIV. Eggenberg (23.942)
- XV. Wetzelsdorf (16.731)
- XVI. Straßgang (20.095)
- XVII. Puntigam (10.251)

== Demographics ==
Historical population
Year	Pop.	±%
1869	98,229	—
1880	116,770	+18.9%
1890	135,660	+16.2%
1900	168,808	+24.4%
1910	193,790	+14.8%
1923	199,578	+3.0%
1934	210,845	+5.6%
1939	208,106	−1.3%
1951	226,476	+8.8%
1961	237,080	+4.7%
1971	249,089	+5.1%
1981	243,166	−2.4%
1991	237,810	−2.2%
2001	226,244	−4.9%
2011	261,726	+15.7%
2021	291,731	+11.5%
Source: Statistics Austria

As of 1 January 2026, the city has a total population of 307,912 (with primary residence status or Hauptwohnsitz), out of which are 215,776 (70%) with Austrian citizenship, 43,718 (14%) with EU citizenship, and 48,418 (16%) non-EU nationals.

Largest groups of foreign nationals, 2024
Nationality	Population
Croatia	11,463
Romania	8,985
Germany	7,739
Bosnia and Herzegovina	7,578
Turkey	6,023
Hungary	4,351
Ukraine	4,283
Syria	4,013
Afghanistan	3,435
Russia	2,858
Slovenia	2,571
Italy	1,934
Serbia	1,852
Kosovo	1,848
Iran	1,132
China	1,097
Bulgaria	1,048
Nigeria	1,032
Egypt	989
India	888

=== Slovene minority ===
Graz, being the capital of the then multiethnic Duchy of Styria, was also a centre of Slovene culture, especially from the establishment of the University of Graz in 1586 until the establishment of the University of Ljubljana in 1919. In 1574, the first Slovene Catholic book was published in Graz, and in 1592, Hieronymus Megiser published in Graz the book Dictionarium quatuor linguarum, the first multilingual dictionary of Slovene.

In the 19th century the student associations in Graz were a crucible of Slovene nationalism and some Slovene students there were more nationally aware than other Slovenes. This led to fierce anti-Slovene efforts by the German supermajority in Graz before and during World War II. Slovenes only ever constituted a tiny minority in the city. This is also why Peter Kozler defined the Slovene territory based on ethnic grounds in his map. In the 21st century, some Slovenian Styrians study and some have found employment there, while being formerly unemployed in Slovenia.

A symposium on the relation of Graz and the Slovenes was held in Graz in 2010, at the occasion of the 200th anniversary of the establishment of the first and oldest chair of Slovene. It was established at the Lyzeum of Graz in July 1811 on the initiative of Janez Nepomuk Primic. A collection of lectures on the topic was published. The Post of Slovenia commemorated the anniversary with a stamp.

== Sights ==
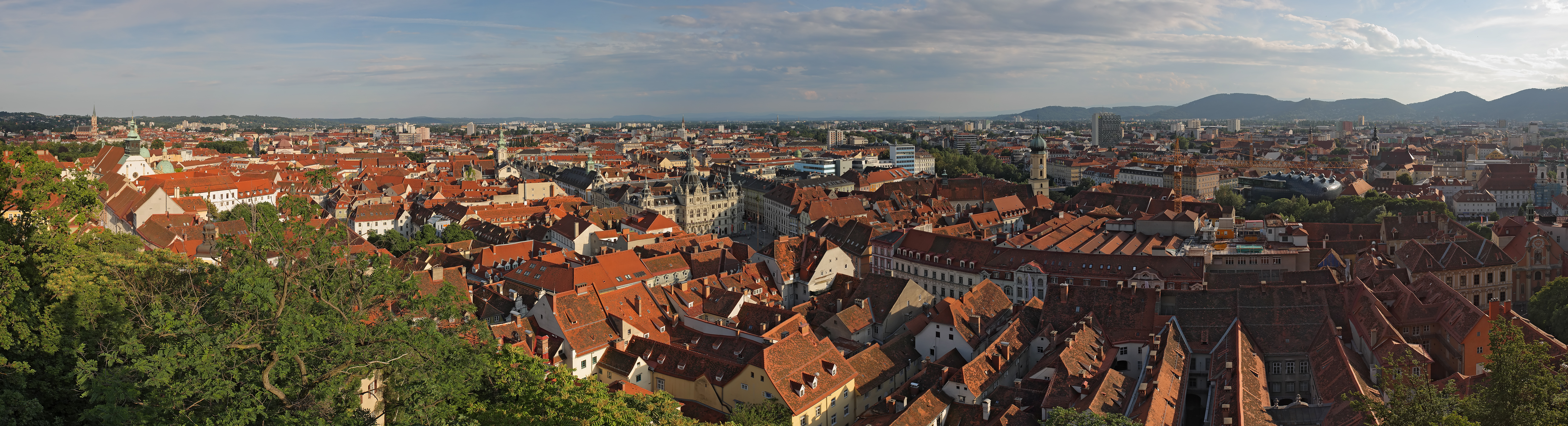
A panoramic view of the historic centre from the Castle Hill (Schlossberg)

For the year that Graz was Cultural Capital of Europe, new structures were erected. The Graz Museum of Contemporary Art (Kunsthaus Graz) was designed by Peter Cook and Colin Fournier and is situated next to the river Mur. The Island in the Mur is a floating platform made of steel. It was designed by American architect Vito Acconci and contains a café, an open-air theatre and a playground.

=== Historic city centre ===
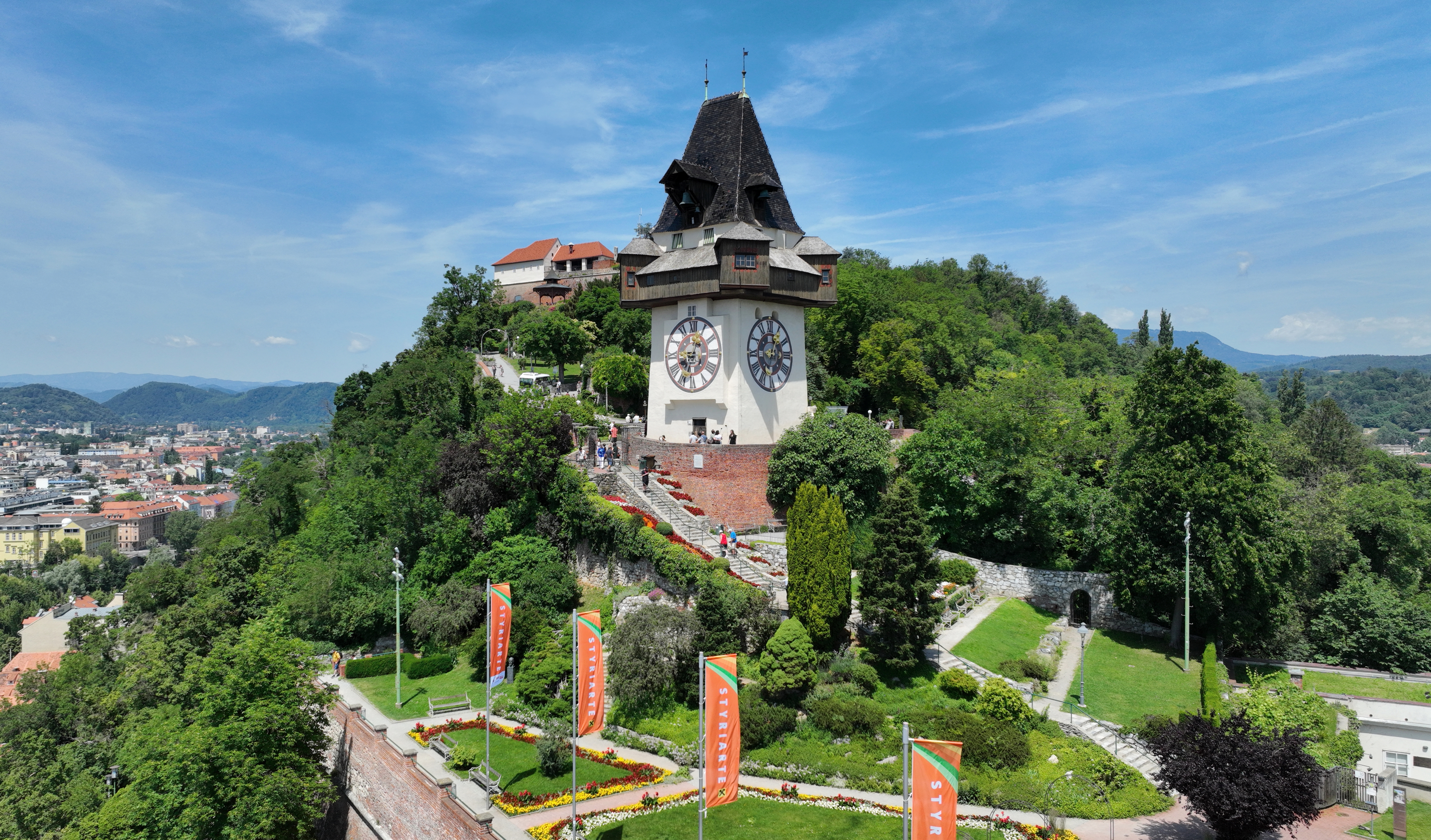
The Castle Hill with the Clock Tower

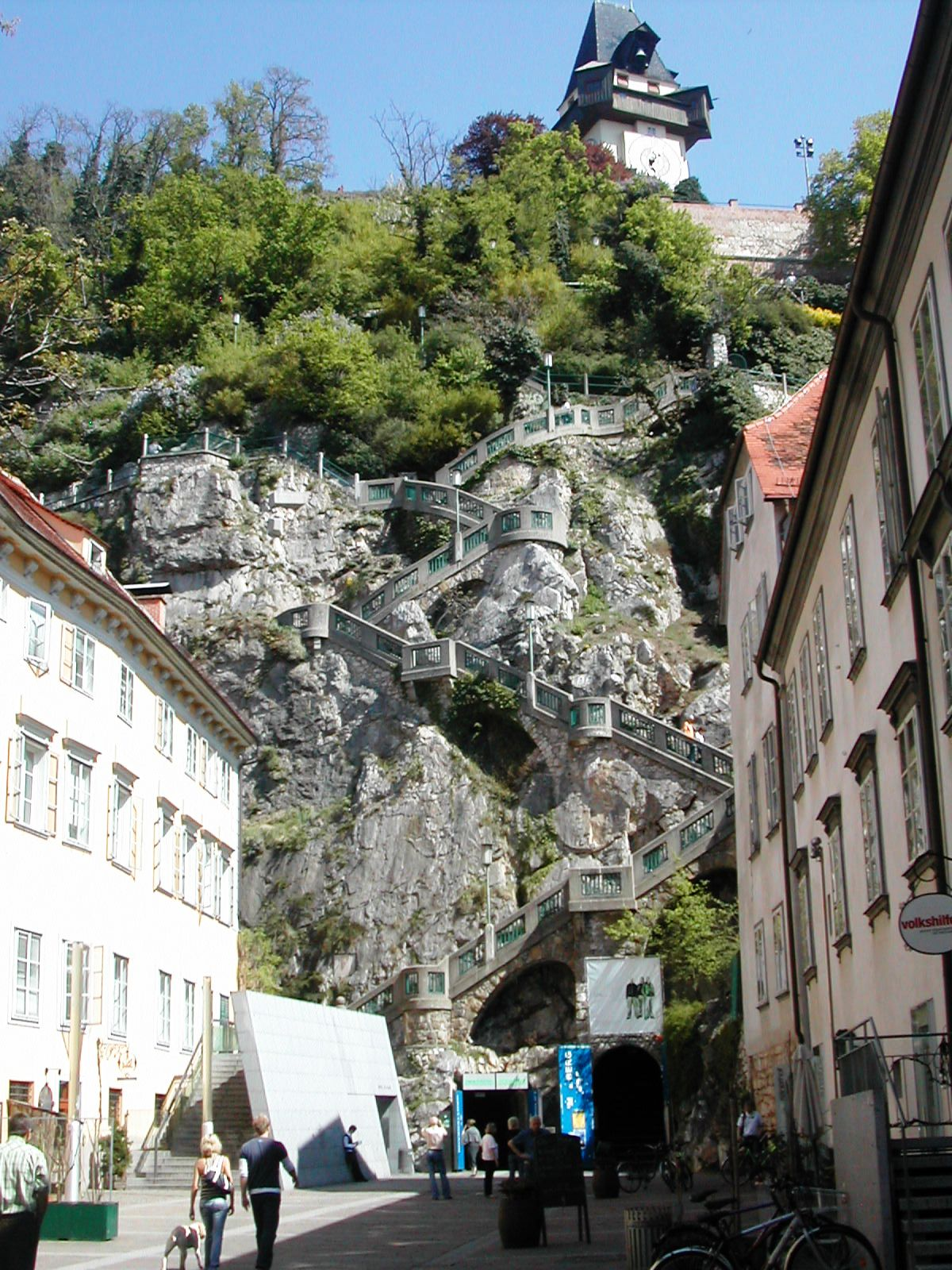
The Castle Hill Stairs, a.k.a. the War Track (Kriegssteig)

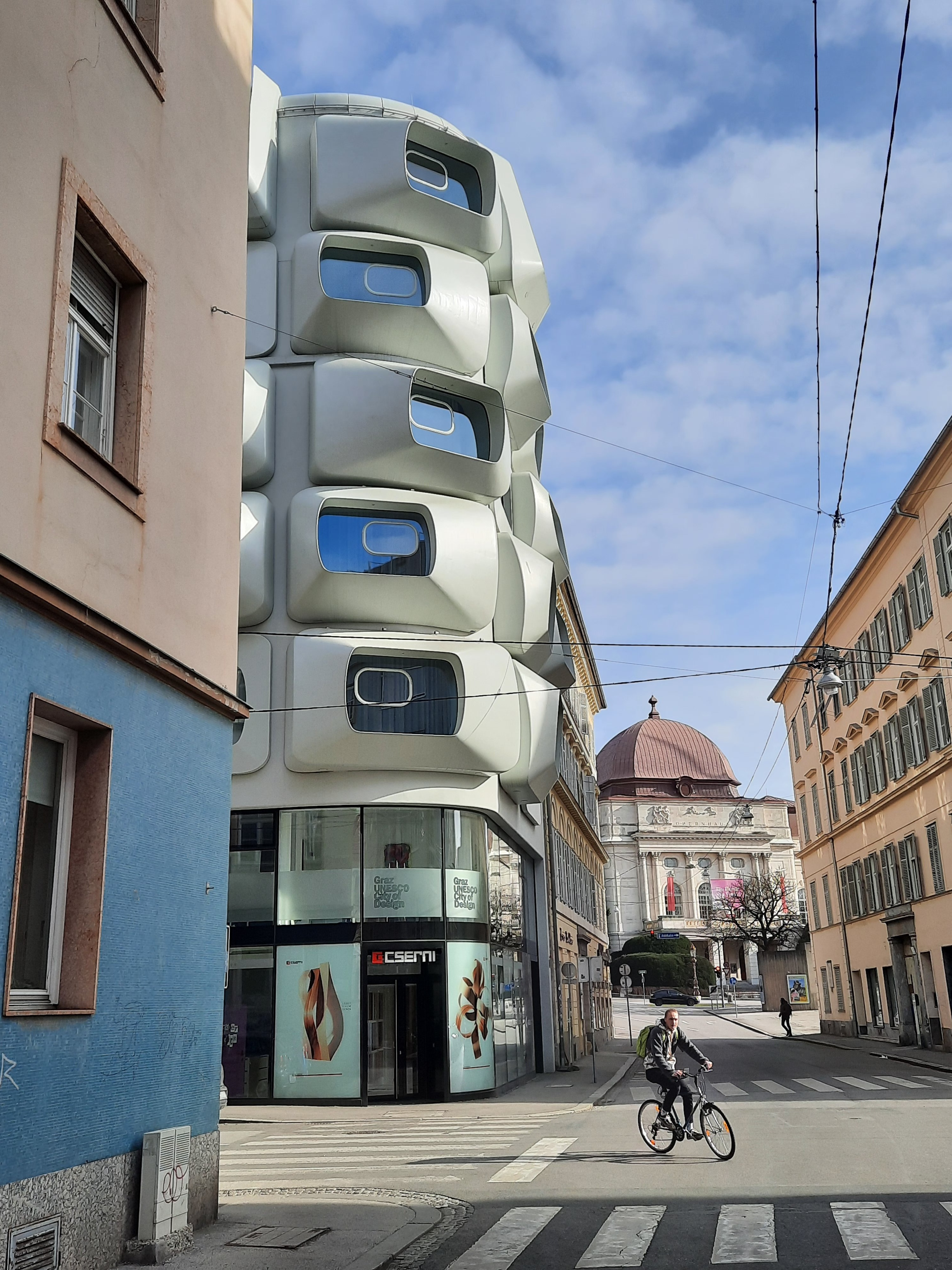
Burggasse

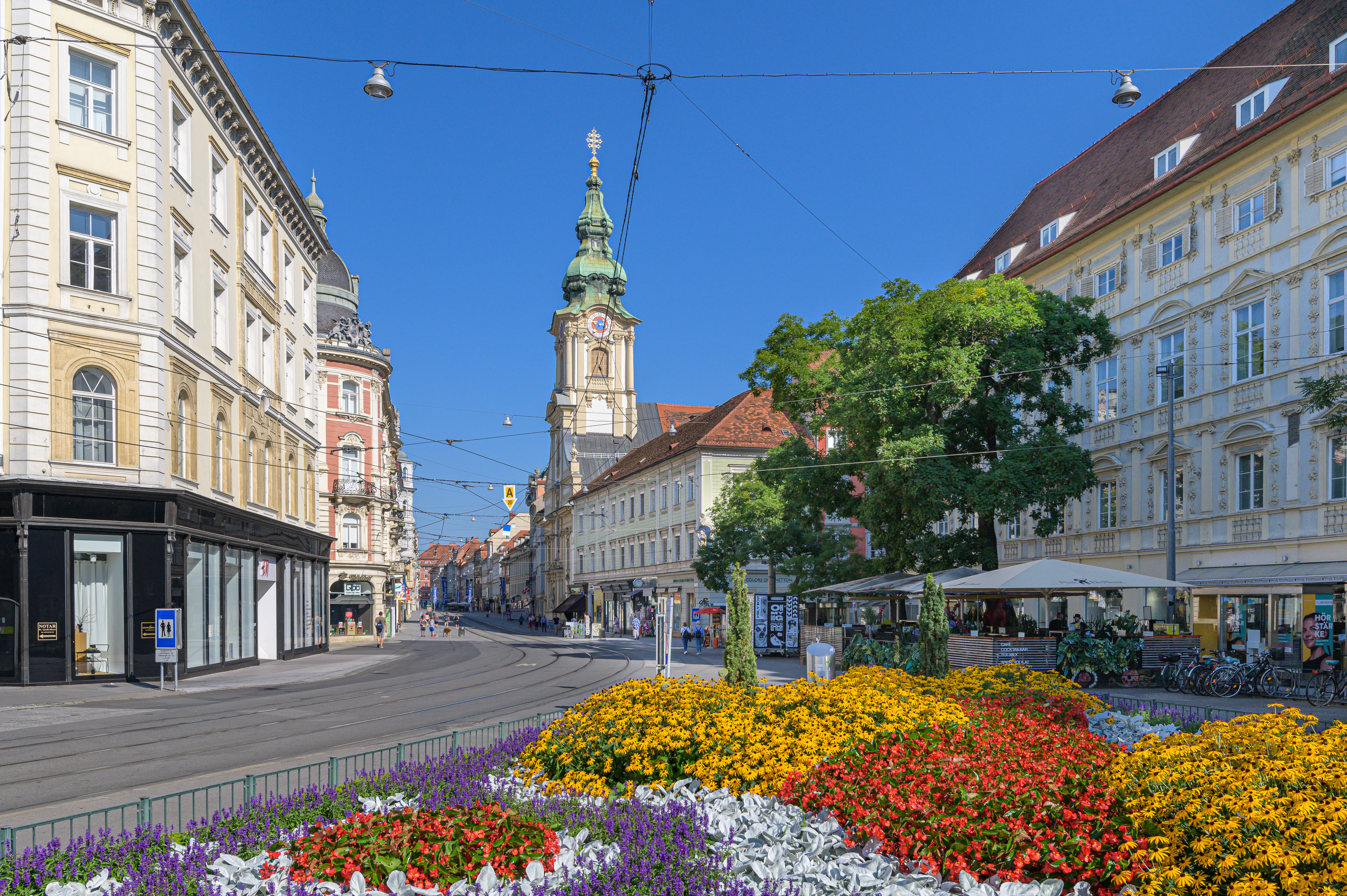
View from the Iron Gate (Eisernes Tor)

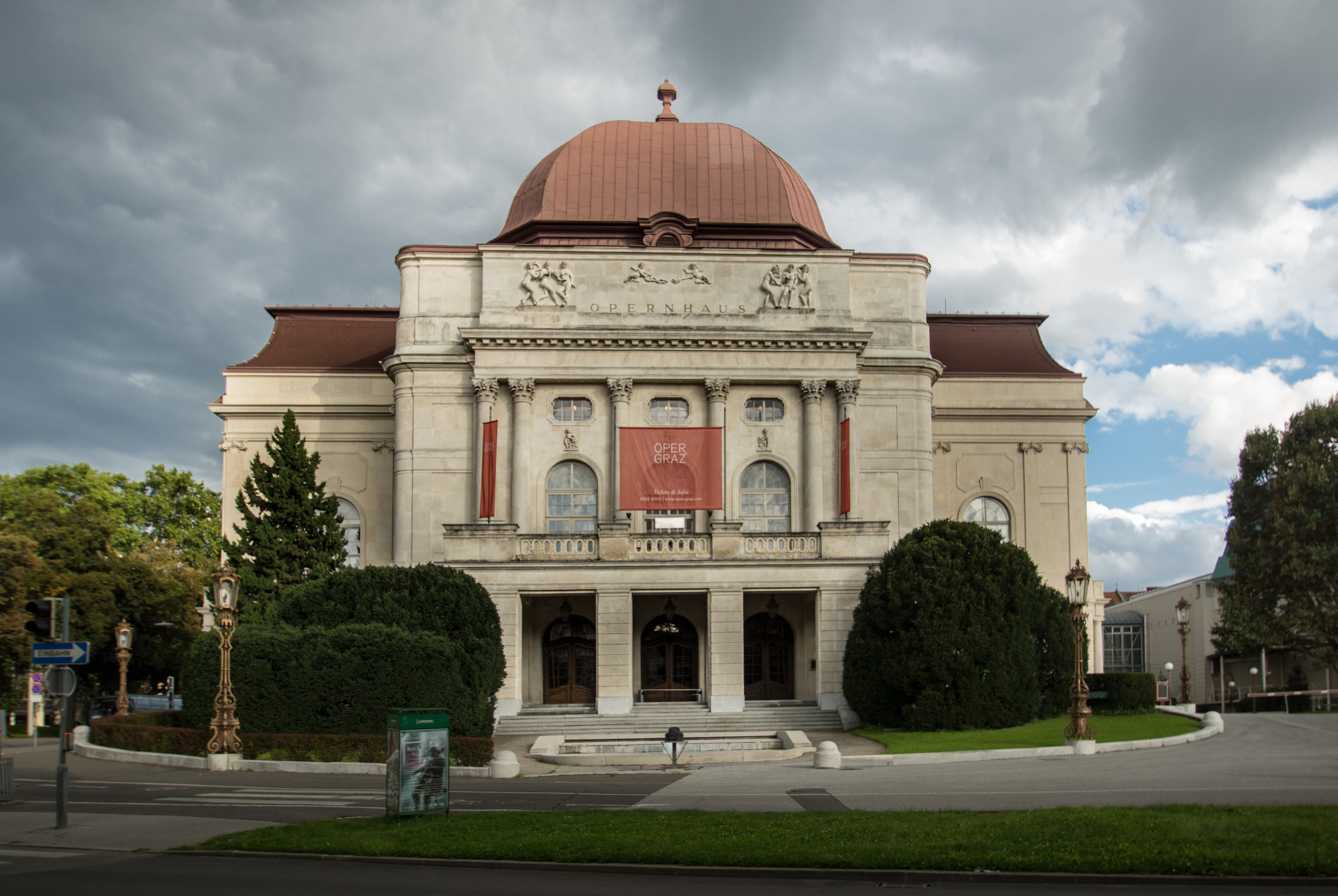
Opera

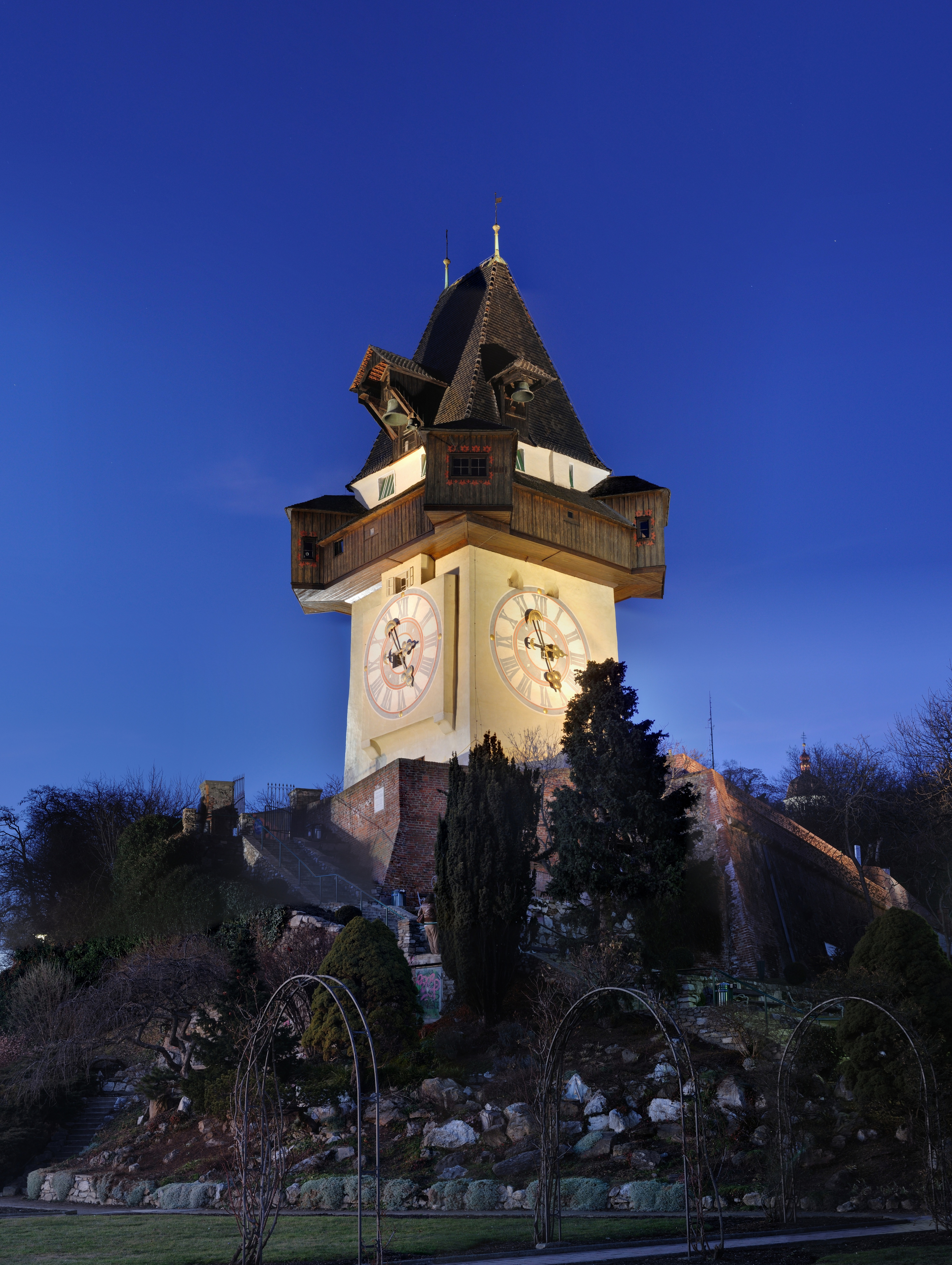
Castle Hill (Schlossberg)

The historic city centre was added to the UNESCO World Heritage List in 1999. This was due to the harmonious co-existence of typical buildings from different epochs and in different architectural styles. Situated in a cultural borderland between Central Europe, Italy and the Balkan States, Graz absorbed various influences from the neighbouring regions and thus received its exceptional townscape. The historic centre consists of over 1,000 buildings, their age ranging from Gothic to contemporary. The most important sights in the historic centre are:

- Town Hall (Rathaus).
- The Castle Hill (German: Schlossberg), a hill dominating the historic centre (475 m (1,558.40 ft) high), site of a demolished fortress, with views over Graz.
- The Clock Tower (Uhrturm) is a symbol of Graz, at the top of the Castle Hill.
- The New Gallery (Neue Galerie), a museum of art.
- The Castle Hill funicular (Schlossbergbahn), a funicular railway on the Castle Hill's slope.
- The seat of Styria's provincial parliament (Landhaus), a palace in Lombardic style. It is one of the most important examples of Renaissance architecture in Austria and was built by Italian architect Domenico dell'Allio between 1557 and 1565.
- The Armoury (Landeszeughaus) is the largest of its kind in the world.
- The Opera House (Opernhaus), the principal venue for opera, ballet, and operetta performances. It is the 2nd largest opera house in Austria.
- The Theatre (Schauspielhaus), Graz's principal theatre for productions of plays.
- The Cathedral (Dom), a rare monument of Gothic architecture. Once, there were many frescos on the outer walls; today, only a few remain, like the Landplagenbild ("picture of plagues") painted in 1485, presumably by Thomas von Villach. The three plagues it depicts are locusts, pestilence and the invasion of the Turks, all of them striking the town in 1480. It features the oldest painted view of Graz.
- The mausoleum of Emperor Ferdinand II next to the cathedral, the most important building of Mannerism in Graz. It includes both the grave where Ferdinand II and his wife are buried, and a church dedicated to St Catherine of Alexandria.
- The City Park (Stadtpark), located in the middle of the city centre during the Habsburg monarchy. It was designed by German architect Johannes Schirgie von Premstätten-Tobelbad. During the COVID-19 pandemic eccentric parties were celebrated which were later dissolved by the police. The responsible, Jonas Fabio Cristo Pinter, an Italian club owner, was arrested and the partying stopped. The City Park (Stadtpark) should not be confused with a similarly named shopping centre in Graz, called Citypark.
- The Castle (Burg), with a Gothic double-helix staircase, built between 1438 and 1453 by Emperor Frederick III, because the old castle on the Castle Hill was too small and uncomfortable. The Castle remained the residence of the Inner Austrian Court until 1619. Today, it serves as residence for the Styrian government.
- The Painted House (Gemaltes Haus) in Herrengasse 3. It is completely covered with frescos (painted in 1742 by Johann Mayer).
- The Graz Museum of Contemporary Art (Kunsthaus Graz)
- The Island in the Mur (Murinsel), an artificial island in the Mur river.
- Buildings, inner courtyards (e. g. Early Renaissance courtyard of the Former House of Teutonic Knights in Sporgasse 22) and roofscape of the old town.

=== Outside the historic city centre ===
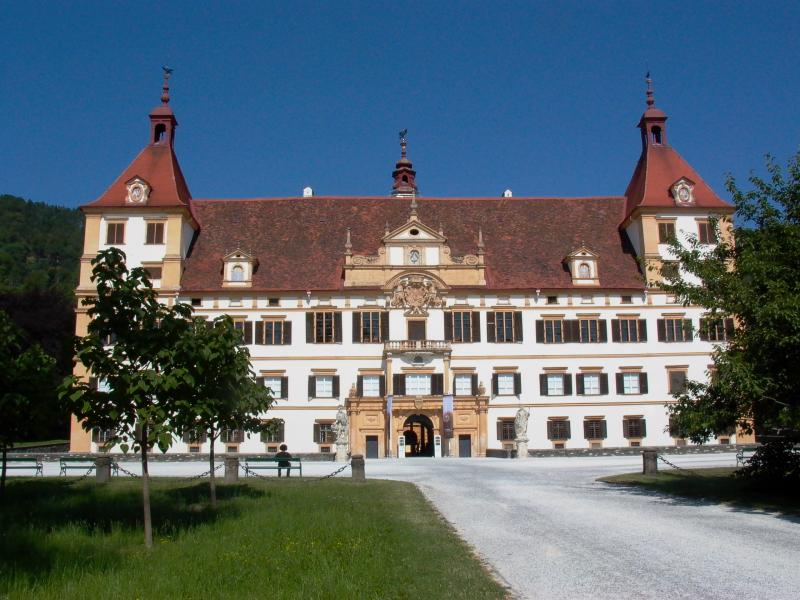
Eggenberg Palace (Schloss Eggenberg)

- Eggenberg Palace (Schloss Eggenberg) a baroque palace on the western edge of Graz with State rooms and museum. In 2010 it was added to the existing World Heritage site of the historic centre of Graz.
- The Mariatrost Basilica (Basilika Mariatrost) a late Baroque church, on the eastern edge of Graz.
- The Jesus's Heart Church (Herz-Jesu-Kirche) is the largest church in Graz with the third highest spire in Austria, built in Gothic Revival style.
- The Calvary Hill (Kalvarienberg) in the Gösting area of Graz with a 17th-century calvary and church.
- The Graz University Hospital is the largest hospital in Graz and one of the largest hospitals in Austria. It is the largest Jugendstil building complex in Austria and was built between 1904 and 1912. It is run by the federal state Styria and is one of the most renowned hospitals in Austria and Central Europe.
- The Gösting Ruin (Ruine Gösting), a ruin of a hilltop castle on the city's northwestern edge, and Plabutsch/Fürstenstand, behind Eggenberg Palace, with a hilltop restaurant and viewing tower, as well as Buchkogel/Kronprinz-Rudolf-Warte are viewpoints for vistas of the city.

=== Greater Graz area ===
- Austrian Open-Air Exhibition Stübing (Österreichisches Freilichtmuseum Stübing), an open-air museum containing old farmhouses/farm buildings from all over Austria reassembled in historic settings.
- The Lur Cave (Lurgrotte), the most extensive cave system in Austria.
- The Piber Lipizzan Stud (Lipizzanergestüt Piber), Lipizzaner stud at Piber, where the famous horses are bred.
- Eight Styrian wine trails (Steirische Weinstraßen) through wine-growing regions in Styria.
- The Thermal Baths Region (Thermenregion), spa region east of Graz.
- Riegersburg Castle, a mighty fortress that never was conquered. It was a bastion against Turkish invasions.

=== Tourism ===
The German travel writer Johann Gottfried Seume visited Graz in 1802 during his famous journey to Syracuse. In his travel account Spaziergang nach Syrakus im Jahre 1802 ("Walk to Syracuse in the Year 1802"), he described Graz as one of the most beautiful regions he had seen, praising its setting along the Mur River, the surrounding hills, and the views from the Schlossberg over the cultivated landscape.

Tourism in Graz is primarily based on the city's well-preserved historic centre and its Mediterranean atmosphere. The city's designation as a UNESCO World Heritage Site in 1999 and its role as the European Capital of Culture in 2003 have played an important role in its tourism development. In the same year, two contemporary landmarks were added to the cityscape: the Kunsthaus Graz, popularly known as the "Friendly Alien", and the Mur Island (Murinsel). In 2012, Agrarmarkt Austria Marketing GmbH designated Graz as Austria's "Capital of Culinary Delights" (GenussHauptstadt). The distinction was linked, among other things, to the regional culinary tradition surrounding the Grazer Krauthäuptel, a variety of butterhead lettuce that was introduced from Carniola to Styria in the early 20th century.

Graz is an important congress and convention destination. As of 2026, the city offers approximately 8,900 commercial guest beds, supplemented by around 1,800 additional beds in non-commercial accommodation, including campsites, youth hostels and private rooms. Prior to the COVID-19 pandemic, around 50% of all overnight stays were attributed to business travellers, 13% to congress and seminar tourism, and 37% to leisure city and cultural tourism. Following the pandemic, leisure and cultural tourism has become the largest segment, accounting for approximately 50% of all overnight stays, while business travel represents around 40% and congress and seminar tourism around 10%.

== Politics ==
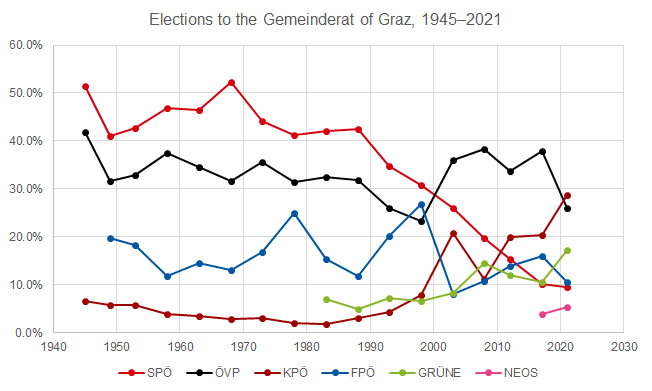
Municipal election results from 1945 to 2021

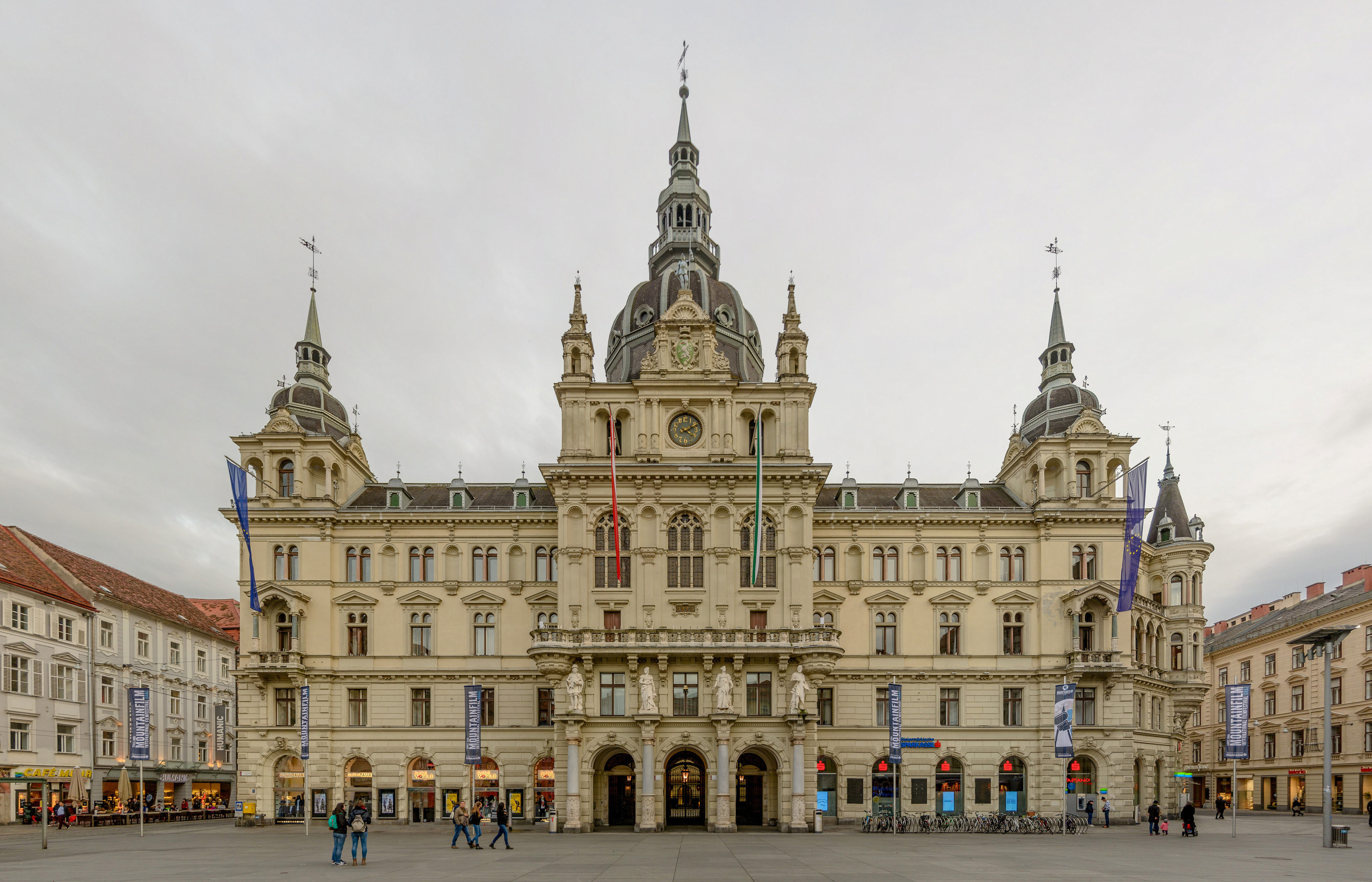
Graz City Hall

For much of its post-war history, Graz was a stronghold of the Social Democratic Party of Austria (SPÖ). Since the late 1990s, the party has lost most of its support on a local level. It was overtaken by the Austrian People's Party (ÖVP) in 2003, which remained the largest party in the city council (Gemeinderat) until 2021. With the decline of the SPÖ, the Communist Party of Austria (KPÖ) has become highly popular in Graz, despite its negligible presence on a national level. The party placed third with 20.8% of votes in the 2003 local election, which has been attributed to the popularity of local leader Ernest Kaltenegger. It fell to 11.2% in 2008, and recovered under new leader Elke Kahr, becoming the second most popular party in Graz with 19.9% in 2012 and 20.3% in 2017. The KPÖ's popularity in Graz allowed them to enter the provincial parliament in the 2005 Styrian state election, marking their first appearance in an Austrian provincial parliament in 35 years; they have retained their seats in the subsequent 2010, 2015, and 2019 elections.

The 2021 municipal election saw a collapse in the ÖVP's popularity, allowing the KPÖ, once again led by Kahr, to become the largest party with 29% of votes. She was subsequently elected mayor in November, leading a coalition with the Greens and SPÖ. The 2026 Graz local election, scheduled on 28 June, saw further gains for the KPÖ, which won in a landslide with almost 36% of the vote.

2026 election results in terms of seats

Party	Votes	%	+/−	Seats	+/−	Coun.	+/−
Communist Party of Austria (KPÖ)	43,145	35.7	▲6.8	18	▲3	3	0
Austrian People's Party (ÖVP)	30,554	25.3	▼0.6	13	0	2	0
The Greens – The Green Alternative (GRÜNE)	18,066	14.9	▼2.5	7	▼2	1	0
Freedom Party of Austria (FPÖ)	14,509	12.0	▲1.6	6	▲1	1	0
Social Democratic Party of Austria (SPÖ)	6,802	5.6	▼3.9	2	▼2	0	0
NEOS – The New Austria and Liberal Forum (NEOS)	5,951	4.9	▼0.6	2	0	0	0
Others	1,840	1.5	▼0.8	—			
Invalid/blank votes	1,493	1.2	▼0.3	—			
Total	122,360	100.0	—	48	—	7	—
Registered voters/turnout	225,883	54.2	▲0.2	—			
Source: Stadt Graz

== Culture ==
During 2003 Graz held the title of "European Capital of Culture" and was one of the UNESCO "Cities of Design" in 2011.

=== Museums ===
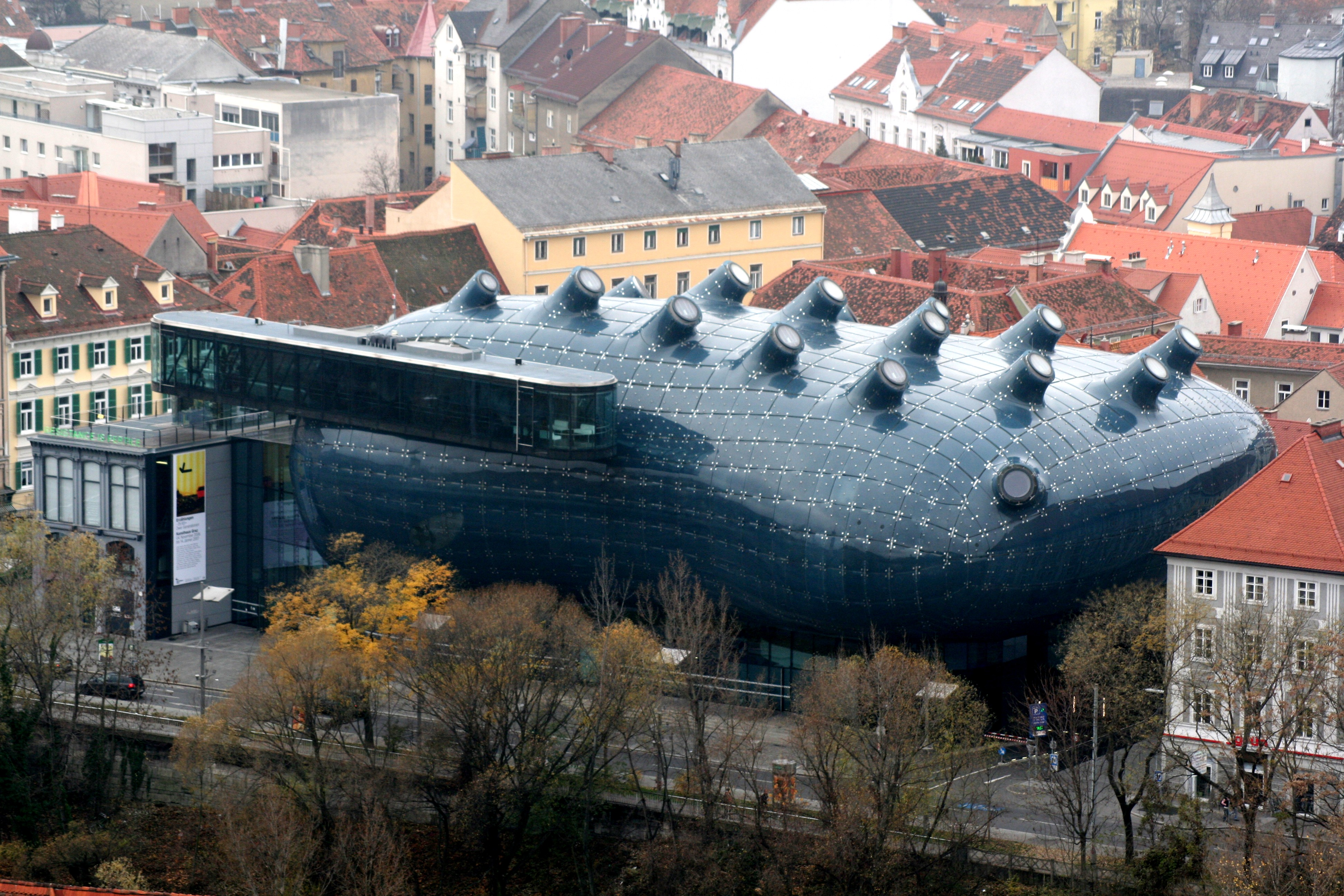
The Graz Museum of Contemporary Art (Kunsthaus Graz)

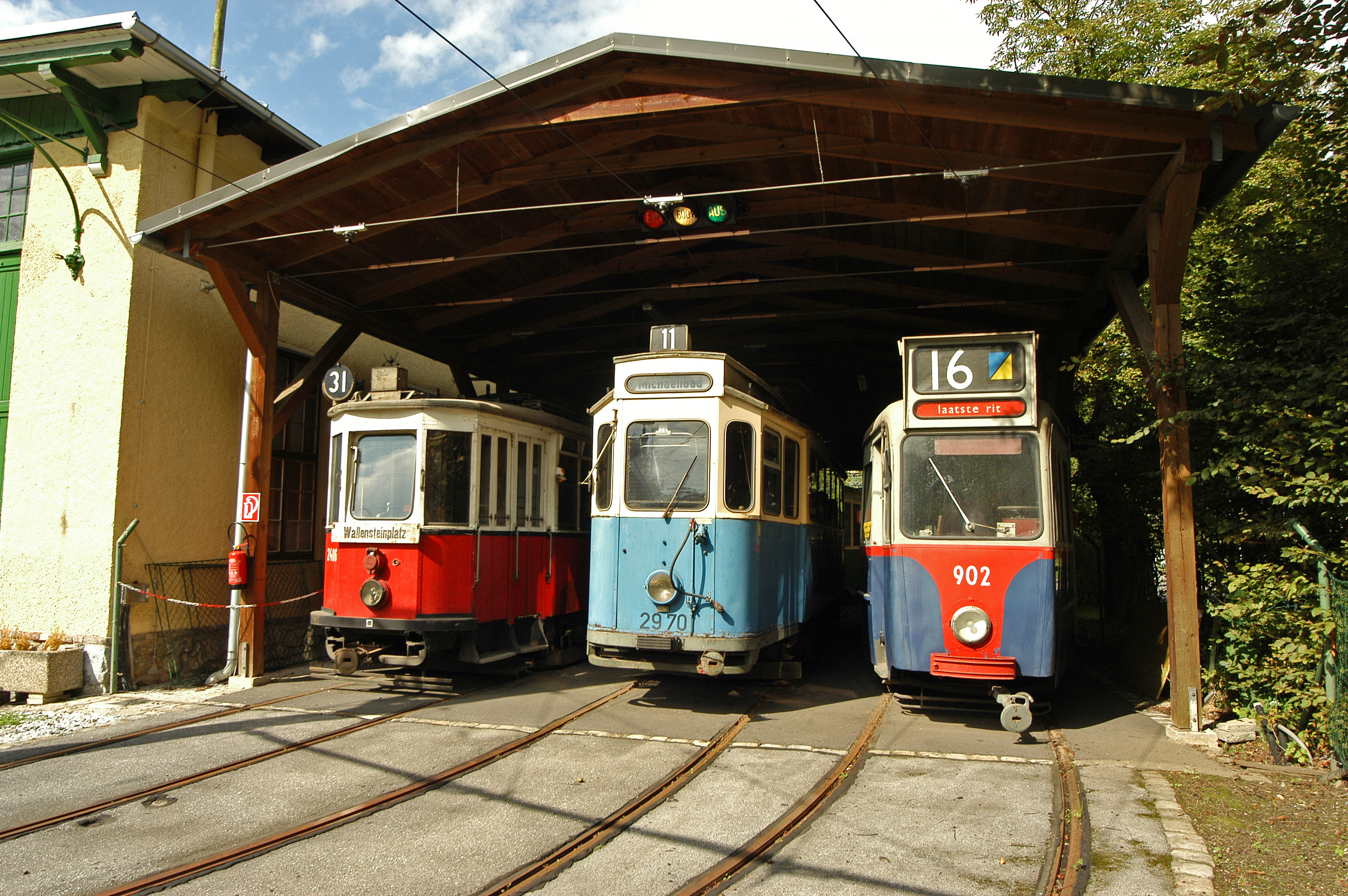
Tramway Museum

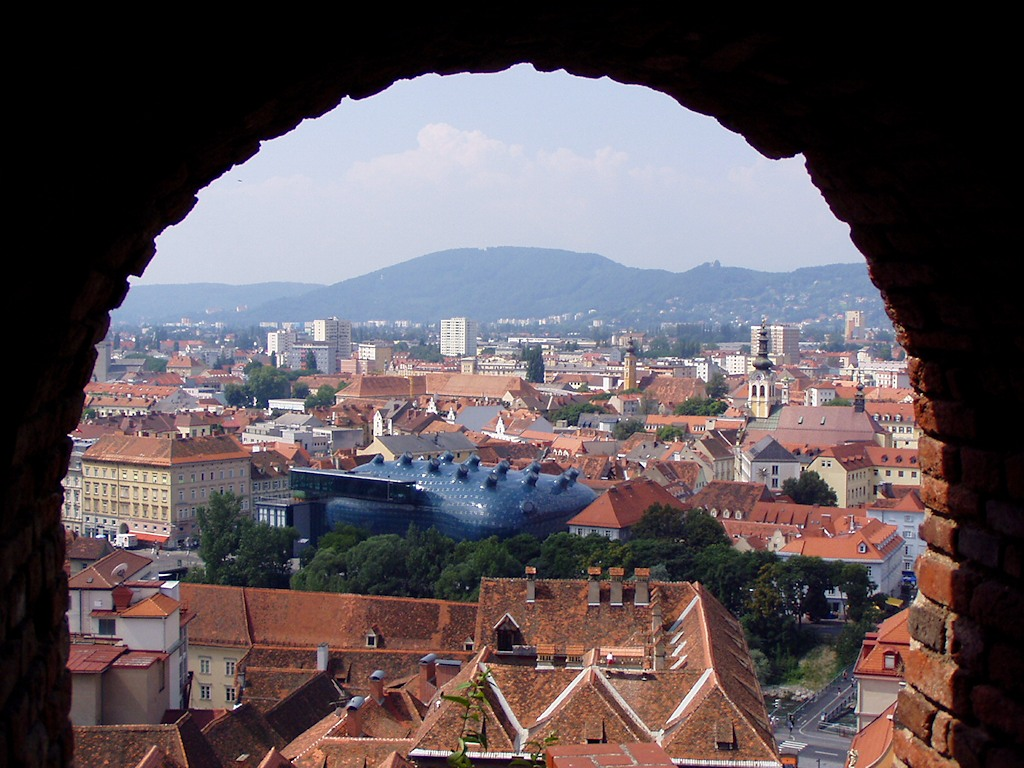
View from the Castle Hill (Schlossberg) with the Graz Museum of Contemporary Art (Kunsthaus Graz) in the centre

The most important museums in Graz are:

- Eggenberg Palace (Schloss Eggenberg) with the Old Gallery (Alte Galerie) (paintings and sculptures from the Romanesque to the end of the Baroque period), Coin Collection, Lapidarium (Roman stonework collection), Archaeological Museum (featuring the Cult Wagon of Strettweg) a special exhibitions area and the 90,000 m^{2} romantic landscape gardens.
- History Museum (Museum für Geschichte): museum of Styrian cultural history from the Middle Ages to the present.
- New Gallery (Neue Galerie): visual arts from the 19th and 20th centuries.
- Natural History Museum: exhibition of botany, mineralogy and zoology.
- Graz Museum (with two locations: Sackstrasse and Schlossberg (Castle Hill))
- Graz Museum of Contemporary Art (Kunsthaus Graz)
- City Park Forum (Forum Stadtpark): museum of contemporary art.
- Camera Austria: museum of contemporary photography.
- Armoury (Landeszeughaus): medieval armoury comprising 32,000 pieces of armour and weaponry, largest of its kind in the world.
- Folklore Museum (Volkskundemuseum): museum of folk culture and folklore.
- Diocesan Museum (Diözesanmuseum): museum of the Roman Catholic Church.
- Styrian Arts Hall (Halle für Kunst Steiermark, formerly Künstlerhaus Graz): exhibition hall of contemporary visual arts.
- Literature House (Literaturhaus): museum of contemporary German literature.
- Museum of Perception (Museum der Wahrnehmung): museum of the senses, samadhi bath.
- Children's Museum Frida & Fred (Kindermuseum Frida & Fred): museum for children.
- Tram Museum: 40 historic trams, the oldest dating from 1873.
- Kriminalmuseum: museum of criminology.
- Aviation Museum (Luftfahrtmuseum): situated at Graz Airport.
- Hanns Schell Collection: key and lock museum, largest of its kind in the world.
- Austrian Sculpture Park: seven hectares of contemporary sculpture.
- Botanical Garden of Graz: three architecturally interesting glass houses plus gardens.

Several of the aforementioned museums are part of the Joanneum Universal Museum (Universalmuseum Joanneum), which consists of 20 museums.

=== Architecture ===
The city centre and the adjacent districts are characterized by the historic residential buildings and churches. In the outer districts buildings are predominantly of the architectural styles from the second half of the 20th century. In 1965, the Graz School (Grazer Schule) was founded. Several buildings around the universities are of this style, e.g. the green houses by Volker Giencke and the RESOWI Centre by Günther Domenig.

Before Graz became European Capital of Culture in 2003, several new projects were realized, such as the Graz City Hall (Stadthalle Graz) - a multifunctional space for e.g. conventions and concerts -, the Children's Museum (Kindermuseum), the Helmut List Hall (Helmut List Halle), the Museum of Contemporary Art (Kunsthaus) and the Island in the Mur (Murinsel).

- Tallest buildings

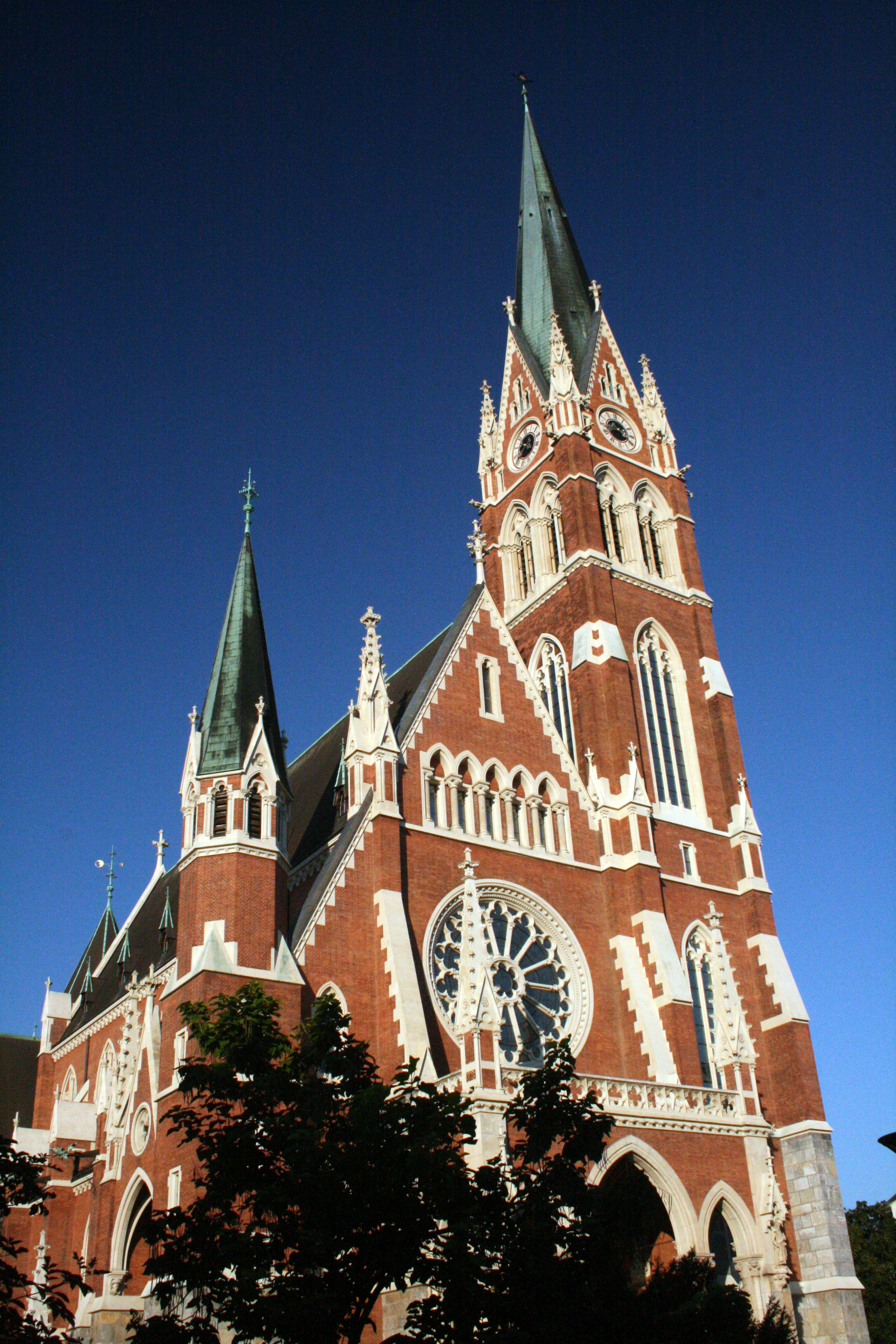
Jesus's Heart Church (Herz-Jesu-Kirche)

Buildings in Graz which are at least 50m tall:

	Name or Address	Completion	Usage	Height (m)	floors
1.	Jesus's Heart Church (Herz-Jesu-Kirche)	1887	church	109	
2.	Elisabeth Building (Elisabeth Hochhaus)	1964	residential	75	25
3. 4.	Kärntner Straße 212, Liebenauer Hauptstraße 309	1968 and 1955	residential	69	21
5.	Franciscan Church (Franziskanerkirche)	1240	church	69	
6.	Alpha Tower	1960/2 floors added in 2015	residential	67	21
7.	Telekom Austria Tower	1960s	office	65	15
8.	Basilica Mariatrost	1724	church	61	
9.	Styria Media Center	2014	office	60	15
10.	Science Tower	2017	office	60	12 plus skygarden
11. 12. 13. 14.	St. Peter Pfarrweg, Kindermanngasse, Hanuschgasse, Algersdorferstraße	1960/70s	residential	55	17
15. 16. 17. 18.	Vinzenz Muchitschstraße, Ungergasse, Kärntner Straße 216, Eggenberger Gürtel	1970s	residential	52	16

=== Sports ===
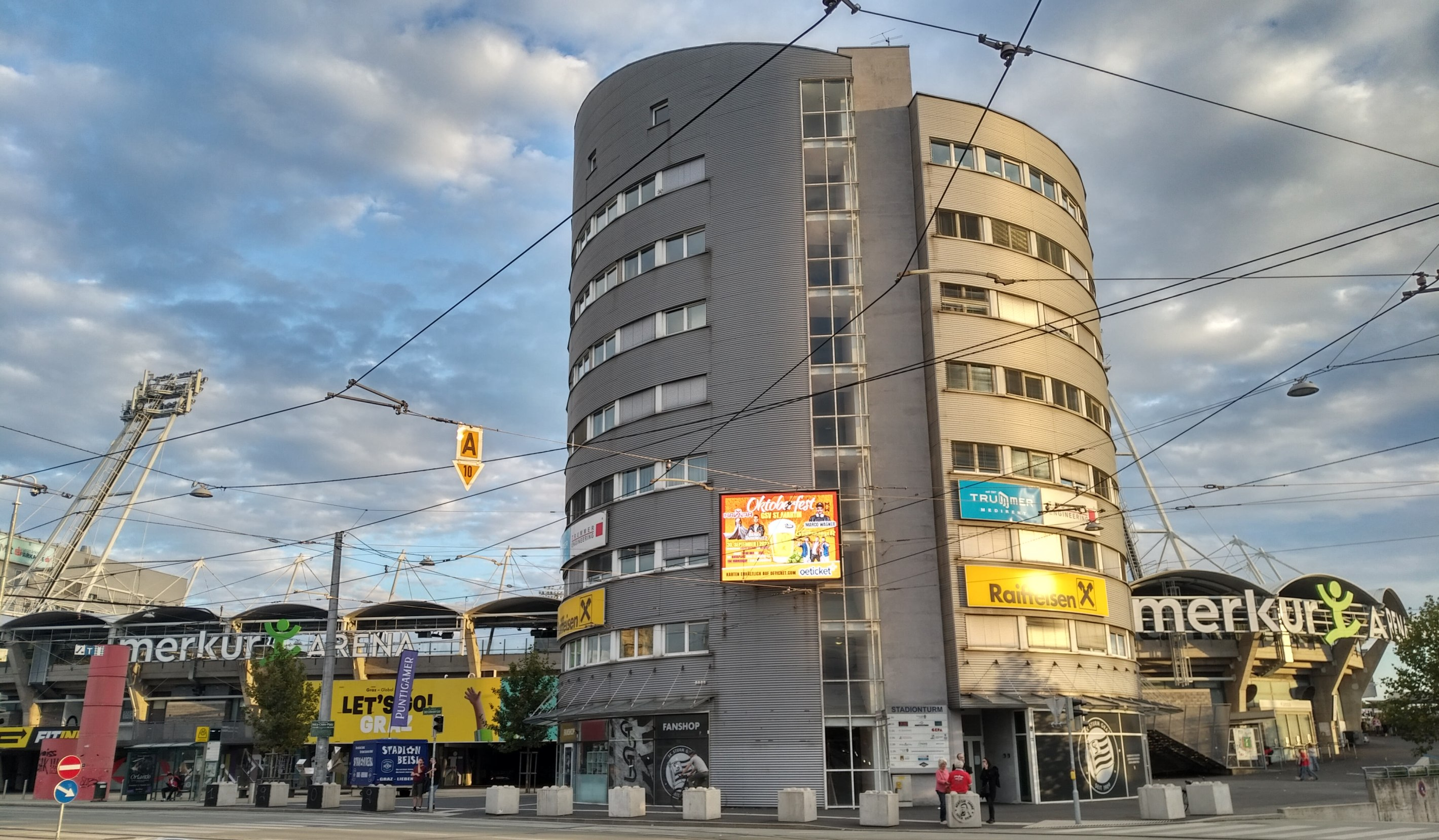
Merkur Arena Graz

SK Sturm Graz is the main football club of the city, with Four Austrian championships, 5 Austrian Cup wins and 4 participations in the Champions League (where they were 1st in the first group stage in 2000/01 and therefore got promoted to the round of 16 as the first Austrian club ever). Grazer AK also won an Austrian championship, but went into administration in 2007 and was excluded from the professional league system.

In ice hockey, ATSE Graz was the Austrian Hockey League champion in 1975 and 1978. EC Graz was runner-up in 1991–92, 1992–93 and 1993–94. Graz 99ers has played in the first division since 2000. UBSC Raiffeisen Graz plays in the Austrian Basketball League. Graz Giants play in the Austrian Football League (American Football). The city bid for the 2002 Winter Olympics in 1995, but lost the election to Salt Lake City.

=== Styriarte ===
Graz hosts the annual festival of classical music Styriarte, founded in 1985 to tie conductor Nikolaus Harnoncourt closer to his hometown. Events have been held at different venues in Graz and in the surrounding region.

=== Dialect ===
Referred to as Steirisch by locals, Graz belongs to the Austro-Bavarian region of dialects, more specifically a mix of Central Bavarian in the western part of Styria and Southern Bavarian in the eastern part. The Styrian subsidiary of Austrian Broadcasting Corporation ORF launched an initiative in 2008 called Scho wieda Steirisch g'redt to highlight the numerous dialects of Graz and Styria in general and to cultivate the pride many Styrians hold for their local culture. Two reasons for a melding of these dialects with Standard German: the influence of television and radio bringing Standard German into the home and the industrialization causing the disappearance of the single farmer since the farming communities are seen as the true keepers of dialect speaking.

== Transport ==
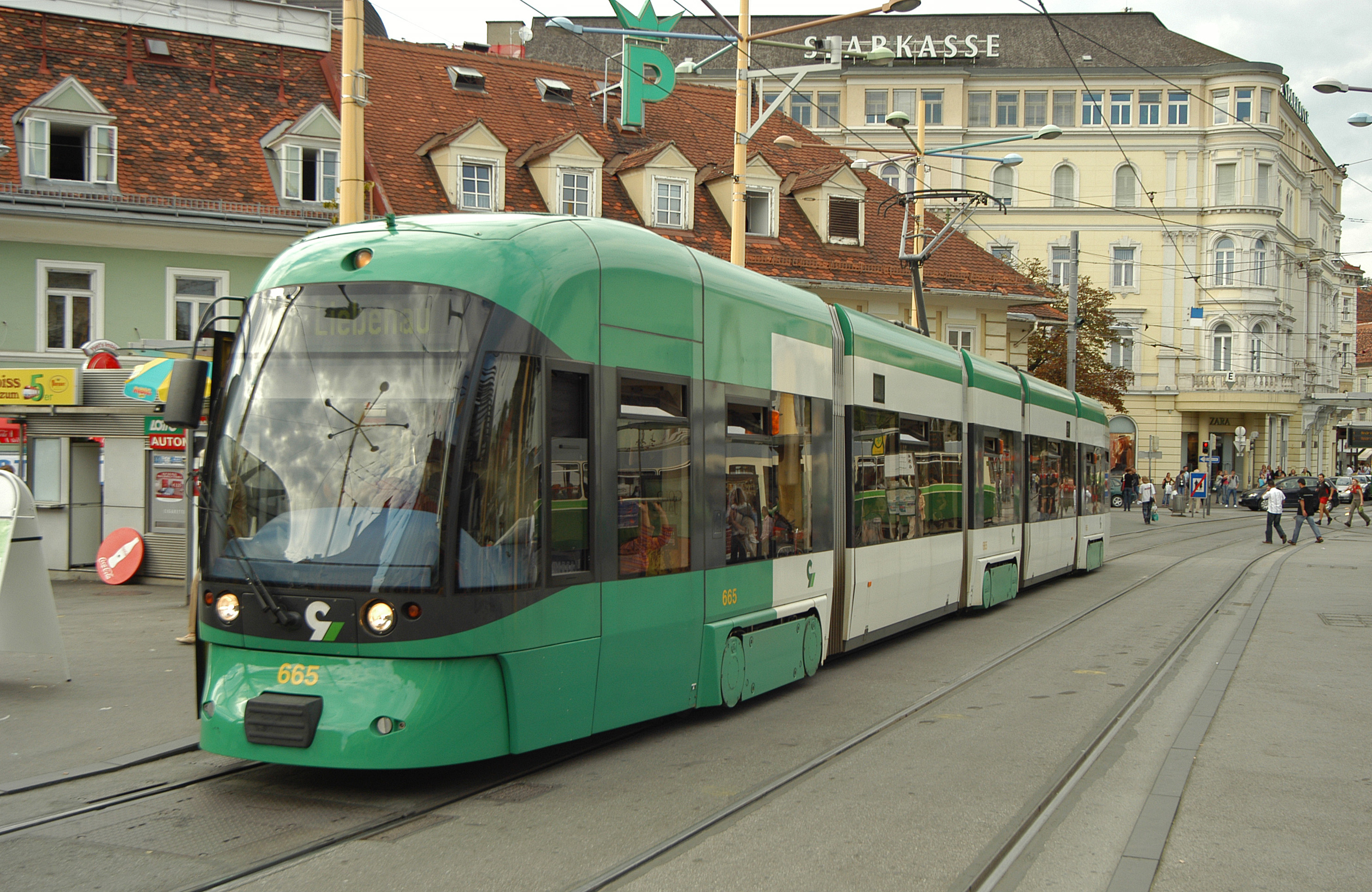
Tram at Jakomini Square (Jakominiplatz)

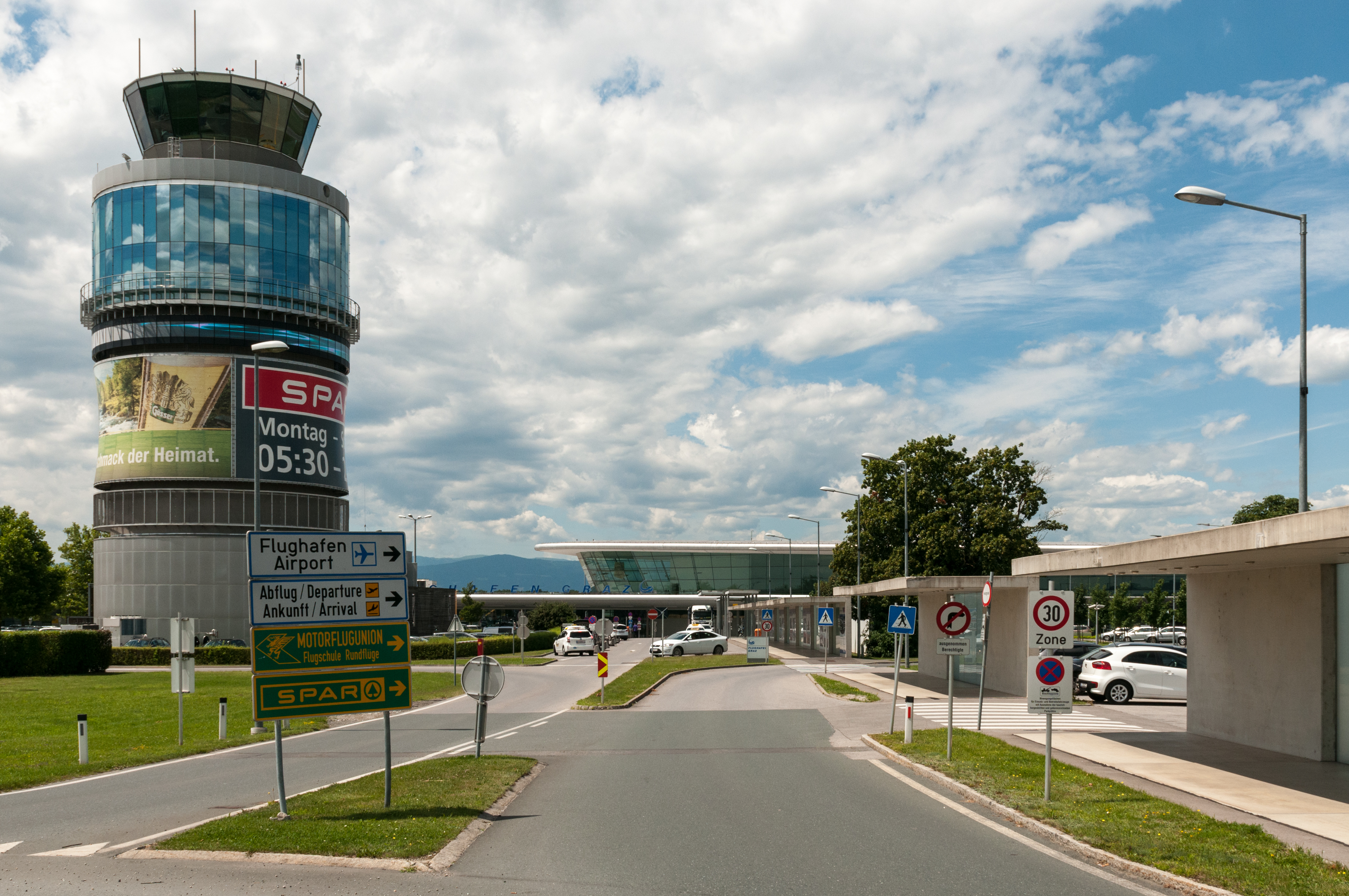
Graz Airport

An extensive public transport network makes Graz an easy city to navigate without a car. The city has a comprehensive bus network, complementing the Graz tram network, which has six lines. Four lines pass through the underground tram stop at the central train station (Hauptbahnhof) and on to the city centre before branching out. Furthermore, there are eight night-time bus routes, although these run only at weekends and on evenings preceding public holidays. The Castle Hill funicular (Schlossbergbahn), and the Castle Hill lift (Schlossberg lift), a vertical lift, link the city centre to the Castle Hill (Schlossberg).

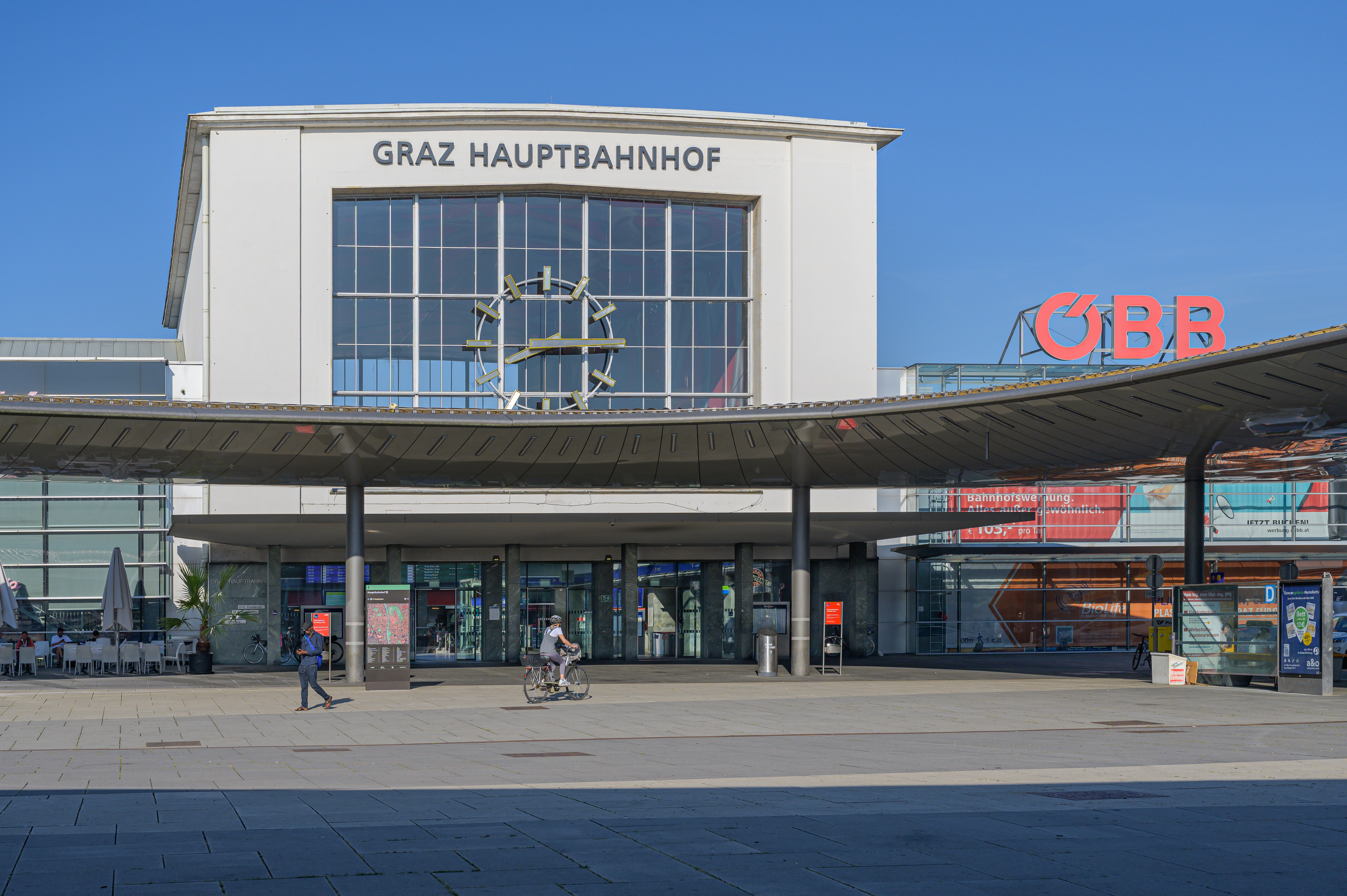
Central Train Station (Hauptbahnhof)

From the central train station (Hauptbahnhof), regional trains link to most of Styria. Direct trains run to most major cities nearby including Vienna, Salzburg, Innsbruck, Maribor and Ljubljana in Slovenia, Zagreb in Croatia, Budapest in Hungary, Prague and Brno in the Czech Republic, Zürich in Switzerland, as well as Munich, Stuttgart, Heidelberg, and Frankfurt in Germany. Trains for Vienna leave every hour. In recent years many railway stations within the city limits and in the suburbs have been rebuilt or modernised and are now part of the Styria S-Bahn, a commuter train service connecting the city with its suburban area and towns nearby.

Graz Airport is located about 10 km (6 mi) south of the city centre and is accessible by bus, railway, taxi and car. Direct destinations include Berlin, Düsseldorf, Frankfurt, Hamburg, Istanbul, London, Munich, Vienna and Zurich. In 2021 a two-line metro system was proposed for Graz, which would make Graz the second Austrian city with a rapid transit system after Vienna.

== Health ==
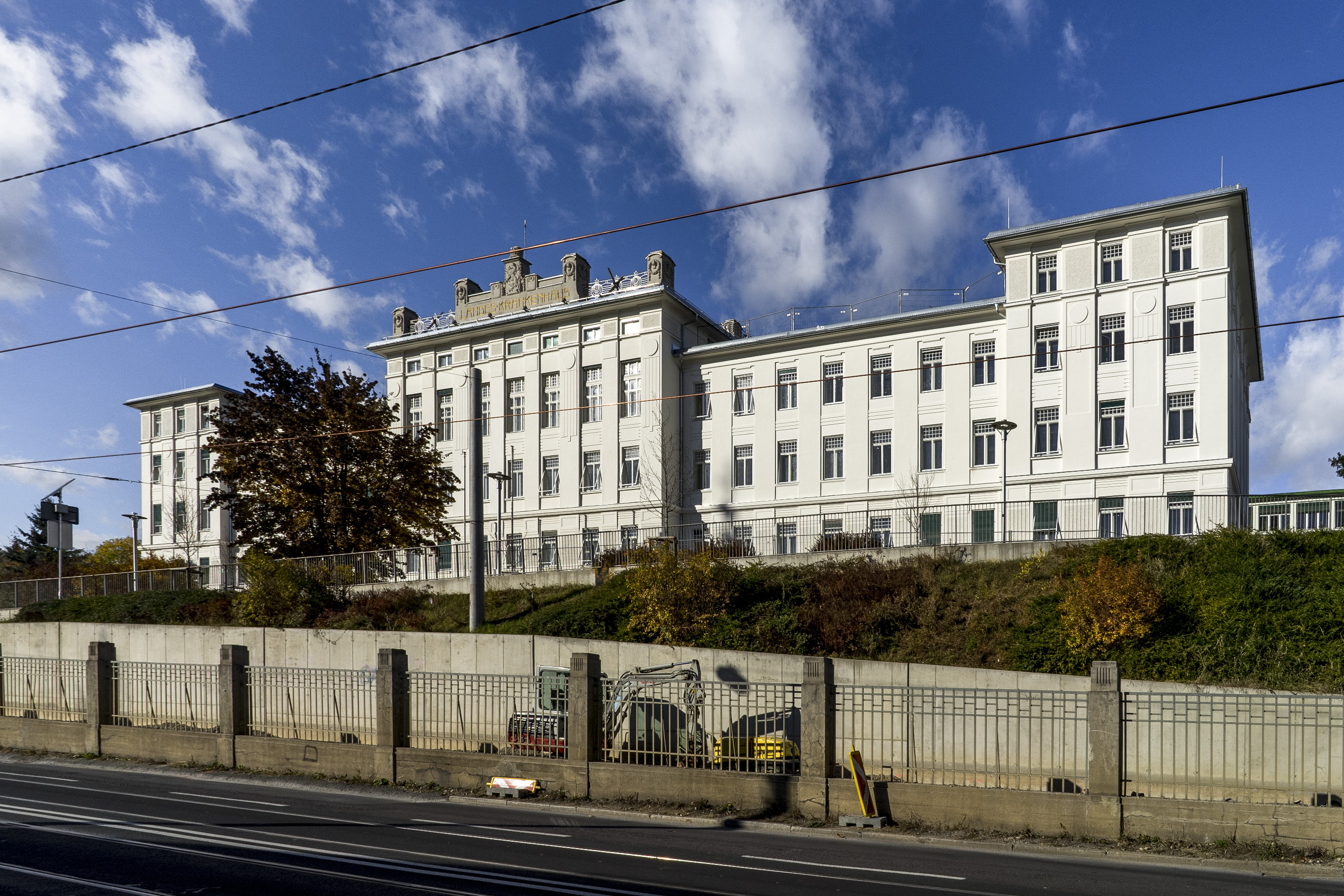
University Hospital Graz (LKH-Universitätsklinikum)

In Graz there are seven hospitals, several private hospitals and sanatoriums, as well as 44 pharmacies. The University Hospital Graz (LKH-Universitätsklinikum Graz) is located in eastern Graz and has 1,556 beds and 7,190 employees. The Regional Hospital Graz II (LKH Graz II) has two sites in Graz. The western site (LKH Graz II Standort West) is located in Eggenberg and has 280 beds and about 500 employees, the southern site (LKH Graz II Standort Süd) specializes in neurology and psychiatry and is located in Straßgang with 880 beds and 1,100 employees. The AUVA Accident Hospital (Unfallkrankenhaus der AUVA) is in Eggenberg and has 180 beds and a total of 444 employees.

The Albert Schweitzer Clinic in the western part of the city is a geriatric hospital with 304 beds, the Hospital of St. John of God (Krankenhaus der Barmherzigen Brüder) has two sites in Graz, one in Lend with 225 beds and one in Eggenberg with 260 beds. The Hospital of the Order of Saint Elizabeth (Krankenhaus der Elisabethinen) in Gries has 182 beds. There are several private clinics as well: the Privatklinik Kastanienhof, the Privatklinik Leech, the Privatklinik der Kreuzschwestern, the Sanatorium St. Leonhard, the Sanatorium Hansa and the Privatklinik Graz-Ragnitz.

EMS in Graz is provided solely by the Austrian Red Cross. Perpetually two emergency doctor's cars (NEF – Notarzteinsatzfahrzeug), two NAWs (Notarztwagen – ambulances staffed with a physician in addition to regular personnel) and about 30 RTWs (Rettungswagen – regular ambulances) are on standby. Furthermore, several non-emergency ambulances (KTW – Krankentransportwagen) and a Mobile Intensive Care Unit (MICU) are operated by the Red Cross to transport non-emergency patients to and between hospitals. In addition to the Red Cross, the Labourers'-Samaritan-Alliance (Arbeiter-Samariter-Bund Österreichs), the Austrian organisation of the Order of Malta Ambulance Corps (Malteser Hospitaldienst Austria) and the Green Cross (Grünes Kreuz) operate ambulances (KTW) for non-emergency patient transport. In addition to the cars, there's also the C12 air ambulance helicopter stationed at Graz airport, staffed with an emergency physician in addition to regular personnel.

== International relations ==
=== Twin towns and sister cities ===
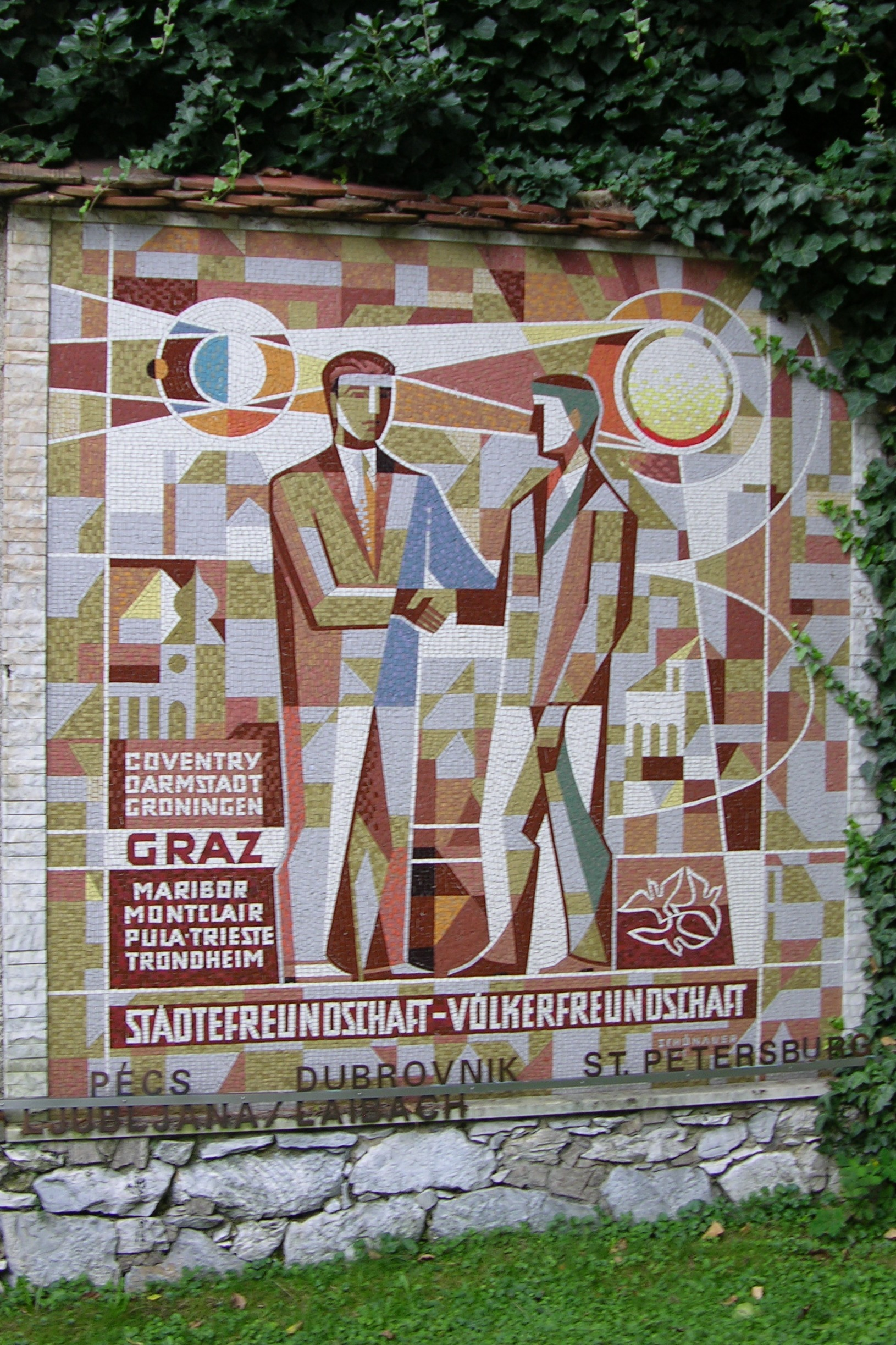

Graz is twinned with:

- Montclair, New Jersey, United States, since 1950
- Coventry, England, United Kingdom, since 1957
- Groningen, Netherlands, since 1964
- Darmstadt, Germany, since 1968
- Trondheim, Norway, since 1968
- Pula, Croatia, since 1972
- Trieste, Italy, since 1973
- Timișoara, Romania, since 1982
- Maribor, Slovenia, since 1987
- Pécs, Hungary, since 1989
- Dubrovnik, Croatia, since 1994
- Ljubljana, Slovenia, since 2001
- Saint Petersburg, Russia, since 2001 (On-Hold, since March 2022)

Other forms of cooperation and city friendship similar to the twin city programmes

- Niš, Serbia
- Banja Luka, Bosnia and Herzegovina

== Notable residents ==
The following are some past and present notable residents of Graz.

- Oktavia Aigner-Rollett (1877–1959), prominent physician
- Peter Handke (born 1942), Nobel Prize in Literature
- Johann Nestroy (1801–1862), playwright and actor
- Ferdinand II (1578–1637), Holy Roman Emperor
- Anne of Austria (1573–1598), Queen of Poland and Sweden
- Ferdinand III (1608-1657), Holy Roman Emperor
- Béla Babai (1914–1997), Romani American musician
- Wladimir Köppen (1846-1940), geographer, meteorologist, climatologist and botanist
- Wolfgang Bauer (1941–2005), Austrian writer
- Infanta Blanca of Spain (1868–1949), claimant to the throne of Spain
- Karl Böhm (1894–1981), Austrian conductor
- Ludwig Boltzmann (1844–1906), physicist, university professor
- Richard von Krafft-Ebing (1840–1902), psychiatrist
- Constance of Austria (1588–1631), Queen of Poland
- Ulrich Ellison, singer-songwriter
- Manfred Erjautz (born 1966), artist
- Constantin von Ettingshausen (1826–1897), botanist
- Archduke John of Austria (1782–1859), field marshal, imperial regent and modernizer
- Archduke Franz Ferdinand of Austria (1863–1914), heir to the Austro-Hungarian throne whose assassination was the source of World War I.
- Olaf Fjord (1897–1945), actor, film director and producer
- Princess Gina of Liechtenstein (1921–1989), Princess of Liechtenstein from 1943 to 1989
- Peter Rosegger (1843–1918), writer and poet
- Carl Julius Haidvogel (1891–1974), writer
- Gregor Hammerl (1942–2023), President of the Federal Council
- Nicolaus Harnoncourt (1929–2016), raised in Graz, conductor of classical works on period instruments
- Christian Herdtrich (1625–1684), Austrian Jesuit missionary to the Qing Empire.
- Victor Franz Hess (1883–1964), Nobel Prize-winning physicist
- Hans Hollmann (1933–2022), theatre director and actor
- Johannes Kepler (1571–1630), German astronomer, astrologer, natural philosopher and mathematics teacher at a local seminary.
- Helmut Kollars (born 1968), writer and illustrator
- Otto Loewi (1873–1961), Nobel Prize-winning physiologist
- Archduchess Gregoria Maximiliana of Austria (1581–1597)
- Hans Michael Maitzen (born 1943), astronomer
- Marisa Mell (1939–1992), actress born and raised in Graz
- Franziska Meissner-Diemer (1841–1919), journalist and writer
- August Meyszner (1886–1947), SS officer executed for war crimes
- August Musger (1868–1929), invented slow motion cinema means
- Olga Neuwirth (born 1968), contemporary Austrian composer
- Lili Novy (1885–1958), Slovenian lyric poet
- Marie Pachler (1794–1855), Austrian pianist
- Johann Puch (1862–1914), Slovene inventor and mechanic
- Adam Rainer (1899–1950), only documented person to have been both one of the shortest and one of tallest people.
- Anton Rintelen (1876–1946), cabinet minister and Nazi conspirator
- Eduard Roschmann (1908–1977), Nazi SS Riga ghetto commandant
- Josef Schleich (1902–1949), farmer, helped liberate Jews in WWII
- Hermann Schloffer (1868–1937), surgeon
- Andreas Schnider (born 1959), theologian, academic teacher, author, publisher, consultant and politician, (ÖVP)
- Erwin Schrödinger (1887–1961), Nobel Prize–winning physicist in quantum theory, Chancellor of Graz University in 1936
- Werner Schwab (1958–1994), playwright and visual artist
- Arnold Schwarzenegger (born 1947), former bodybuilding champion, actor and former governor of California; born and raised in farming village Thal, 2 miles (3.2 km) from Graz.
- Brit Stakston (born 1961), writer, public speaker and media strategist
- Friedrich St. Florian (born 1932), Austrian-American architect
- Robert Stolz (1880–1975), Austrian composer and conductor
- Celestina Ekel (1867–1935), Slovenian music teacher, musician, organist and composer who worked and died in Graz
- Nikola Tesla (1856–1943), Serbian-American inventor, who studied electrical engineering in Graz
- Hertha Töpper (1924–2020), opera and concert contralto
- Eliza Frančiška Grizold (1847–1913), Slovenian teacher, poet, and composer
- Hans Ulrich von Eggenberg (1568–1634), Austrian statesman and early "prime minister" during the Thirty Years' War.
- Johann Bernhard Fischer von Erlach (1656–1723), architect of the Baroque period.
- Joseph von Hammer-Purgstall (1774–1856), Austrian orientalist, historian and diplomat.
- Ernestine von Kirchsberg (1857–1924), landscape painter
- Leopold von Sacher-Masoch (1836–1895), writer and journalist, studied in Graz; the term masochism is derived from his name
- Roman von Ungern-Sternberg (1886–1921), prominent figure in the Russian White movement and dictator of Mongolia in 1921
- Franz Voves (born 1953), Austrian politician (SPÖ), State governor of Styria for 10 years, ice hockey player
- Franz Wilczek (1869–1916), violinist

=== Sport ===
- Bernd Brückler (born 1981), professional ice hockey player
- Hans Dobida (1929–2025), Austrian former ice hockey player
- Elisabeth Eberl (born 1988), Olympic javelin thrower
- Michael Gspurning (born 1981), goalkeeper for FC Schalke 04
- Manfred Hoeberl (born 1964), powerlifter and strongman
- Helmut Marko (born 1943), former racing driver
- Emanuel Pogatetz (born 1983), footballer, played 446 games
- Jochen Rindt (1942–1970), first Austrian Formula One champion raised in Graz by his grandmother
- Gert Schnider (born 1979), Abalone champion
- Markus Schopp (born 1974), former footballer, played 364 games
- Thomas Tebbich (born 1975), decathlete and pole vaulter
- Thomas Vanek (born 1984), Ice hockey player, raised in Graz
- Otto Wanz (1943–2017), former professional wrestler who held AWA World Heavyweight Championship

== See also ==
- List of World Heritage Sites in Austria
- Kastner & Öhler
- Villach
