= 2021 Graz local election =

Vote on 26th of September 2021

- 26 September 2021

All 48 seats in the Gemeinderat of Graz 25 seats needed for a majority
- Turnout: 120,689 (54.0%) ▼3.4%
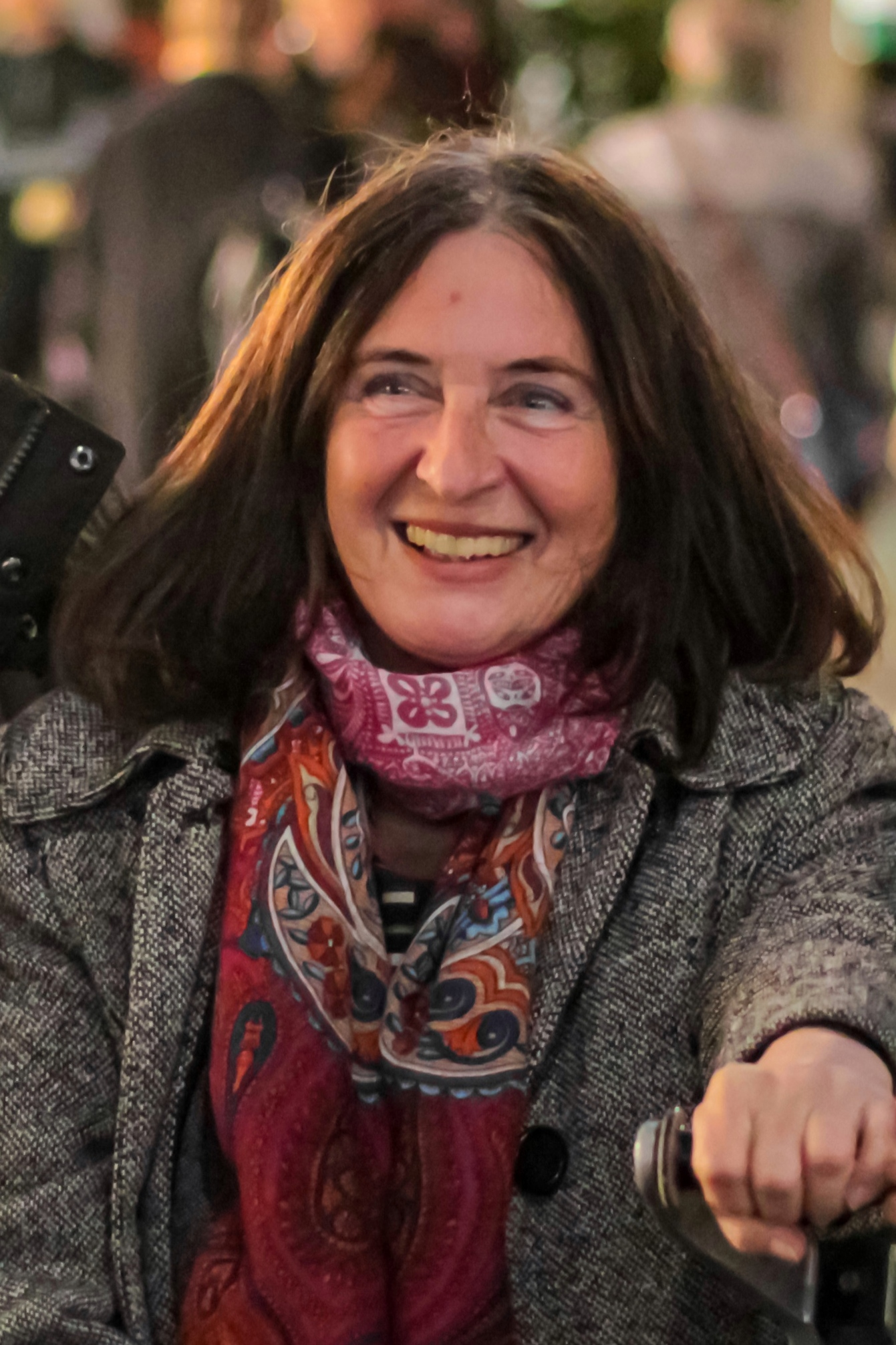

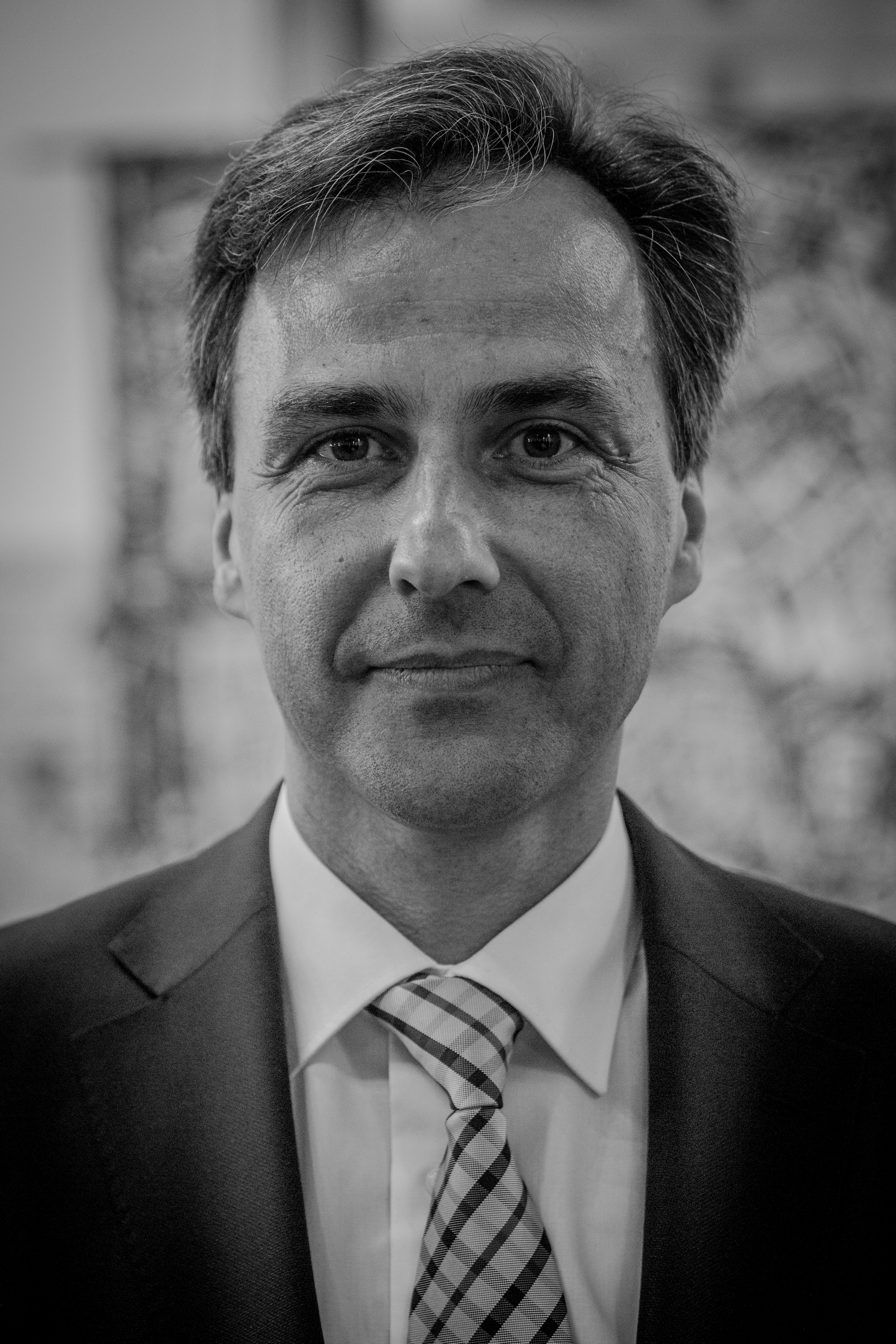

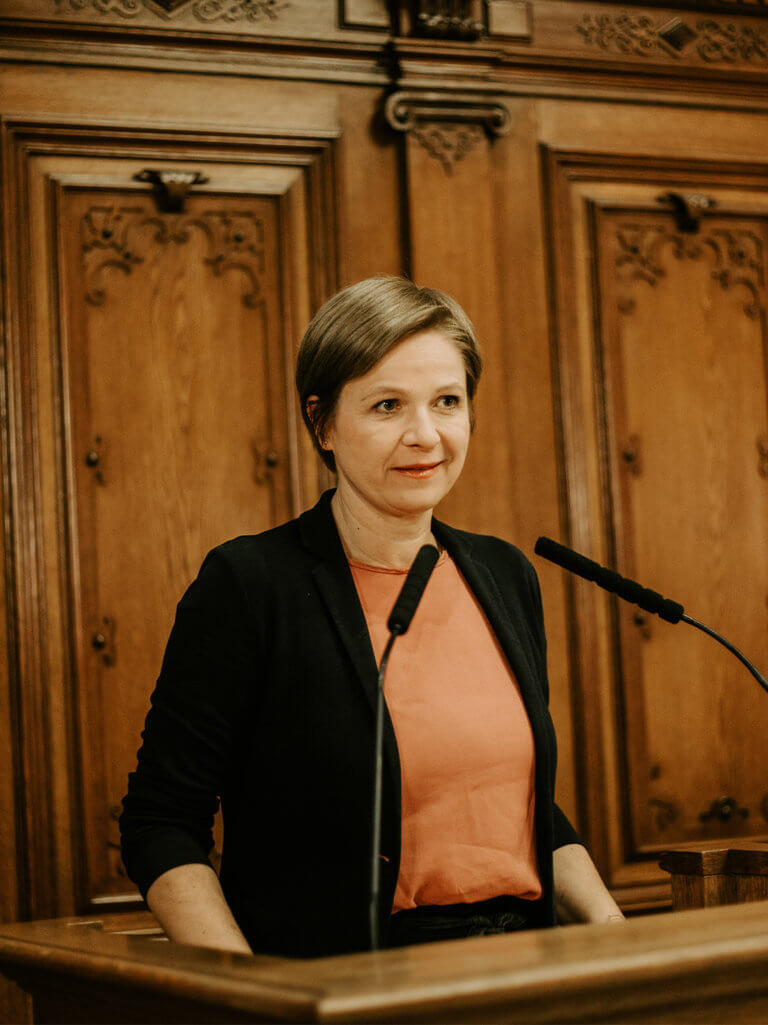

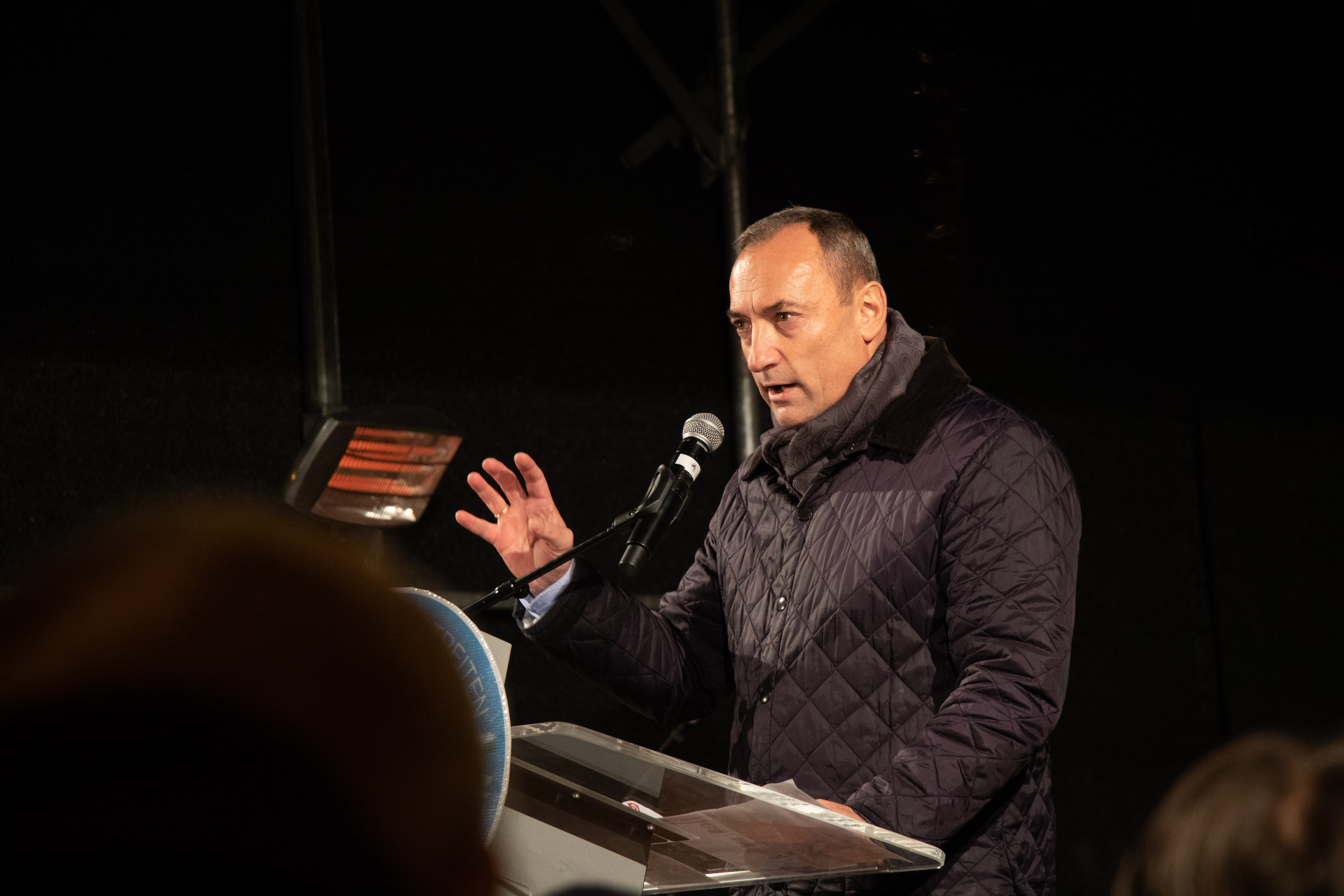

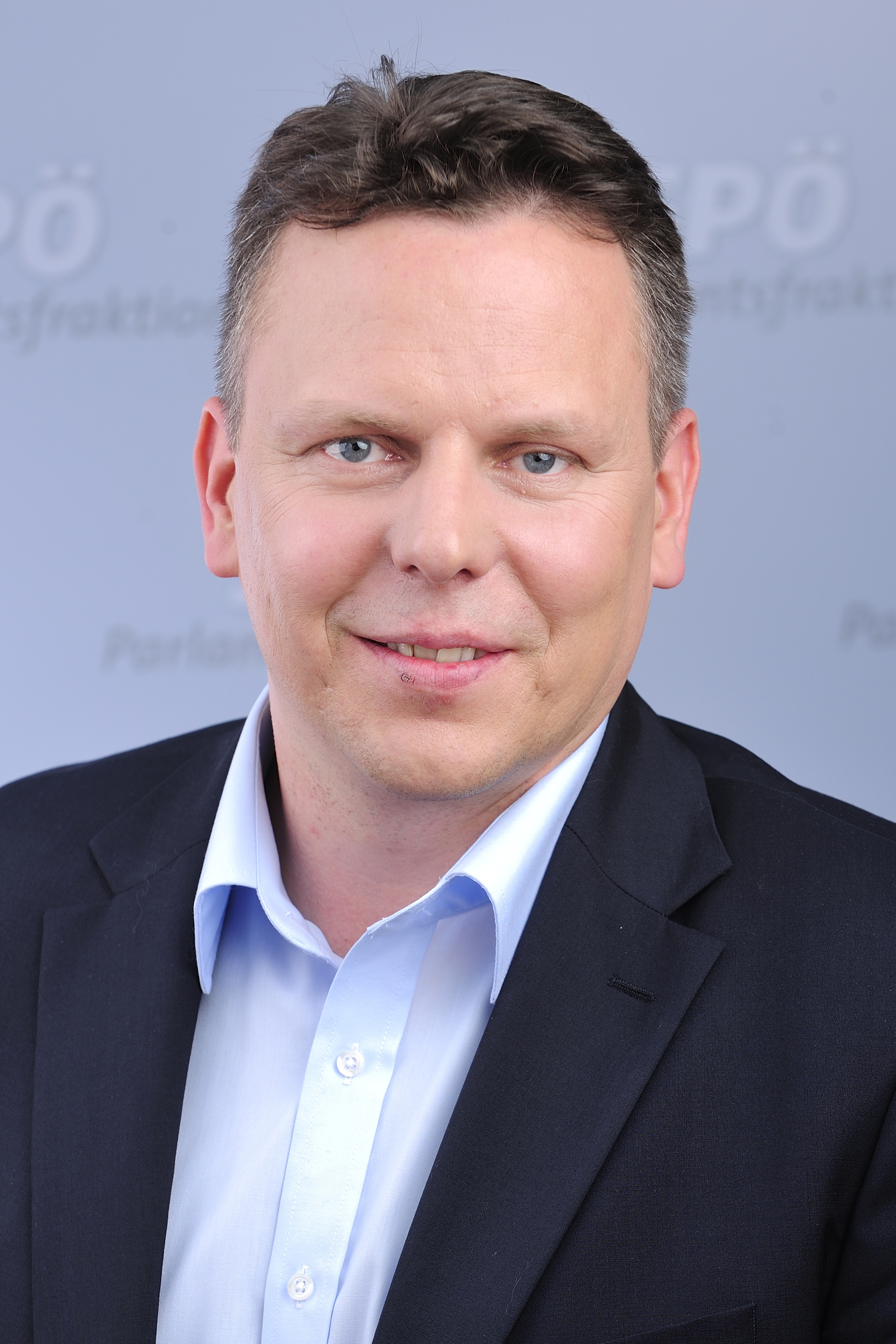
	First party	Second party	Third party
Leader	Elke Kahr	Siegfried Nagl	Judith Schwentner
Party	KPÖ	ÖVP	Greens
Last election	10 seats, 20.3%	19 seats, 37.8%	5 seats, 10.5%
Seats won	15	13	9
Seat change	▲5	▼6	▲4
Popular vote	34,283	30,797	20,593
Percentage	28.8%	25.9%	17.3%
Swing	▲8.5%	▼11.9%	▲6.8%
	Fourth party	Fifth party	Sixth party
Leader	Mario Eustacchio	Michael Ehmann	Philipp Pointner
Party	FPÖ	SPÖ	NEOS
Last election	8 seats, 15.9%	5 seats, 10.0%	1 seat, 3.9%
Seats won	5	4	2
Seat change	▼3	▼1	▲1
Popular vote	12,612	11,325	6,447
Percentage	10.6%	9.5%	5.4%
Swing	▼5.3%	▼0.5%	▲1.5%
- Winning party by municipal district.
Mayor before election
Siegfried Nagl
ÖVP
Elected mayor
Elke Kahr
KPÖ

The 2021 Graz local election was held on 26 September 2021 to elect the members of the Gemeinderat of Graz.

The Communist Party of Austria (KPÖ) became the largest party for the first time in the city's history, winning 29% of votes cast. The previous governing party, the Austrian People's Party (ÖVP), fell from 38% to second place with 26%. The Freedom Party of Austria (FPÖ) also suffered losses and finished in fourth place on 11%, while The Greens moved into third with 17%. The Social Democratic Party of Austria (SPÖ) recorded a slight decline to 9.5%. NEOS – The New Austria won 5.4% and gained a second seat.

Siegfried Nagl, ÖVP mayor of Graz since 2003, announced that he would resign in light of his party's poor result. The KPÖ subsequently formed a coalition with the Greens and SPÖ, and Elke Kahr was elected mayor by the Gemeinderat on 17 November with 28 out of 46 votes. She became the first female mayor of Graz and first communist mayor of an Austrian city.

== Background ==
The Styrian constitution mandates that positions in municipal government (city councillors, German: Stadträten) be allocated between parties proportionally in accordance with the share of votes won by each; this is known as Proporz. As such, the government of Graz is a perpetual coalition of all parties that qualify for at least one city councillor.

In the 2017 election, the ÖVP made modest gains and retained its first-place position with 38%. The KPÖ remained the second largest party in Graz with 20%. The FPÖ finished in third place with 16%. The Greens suffered slight losses, while the SPÖ fell from third to fifth place with just 10% of the vote. NEOS won a single seat in the council. The city government was dominated by the ÖVP with three councillors, while the KPÖ won two councillors, and the FPÖ and Greens won one each.

== Electoral system ==
The 48 seats of the Gemeinderat of Graz are elected via open list proportional representation with no electoral threshold.

== Contesting parties ==
Name		Ideology	Leader	2017 result		
Name		Ideology	Leader	Votes (%)	Seats	Councillors
ÖVP	Austrian People's Party; Österreichische Volkspartei	Christian democracy	Siegfried Nagl	37.8%	19 / 48	3 / 7
KPÖ	Communist Party of Austria; Kommunistische Partei Österreichs	Communism	Elke Kahr	20.3%	10 / 48	2 / 7
FPÖ	Freedom Party of Austria; Freiheitliche Partei Österreichs	Right-wing populism Euroscepticism	Mario Eustacchio	15.9%	8 / 48	1 / 7
GRÜNE	The Greens – The Green Alternative; Die Grünen – Die Grüne Alternative	Green politics	Judith Schwentner	10.5%	5 / 48	1 / 7
SPÖ	Social Democratic Party of Austria; Sozialdemokratische Partei Österreichs	Social democracy	Michael Ehmann	10.0%	5 / 48	0 / 7
NEOS	NEOS – The New Austria; NEOS – Das Neue Österreich und Liberales Forum	Liberalism	Philipp Pointner	3.9%	1 / 48	0 / 7

In addition to the parties already represented in the Gemeinderat, eight parties collected enough signatures to be placed on the ballot:

- Responsibility Earth (ERDE)
- WiR – Together for Graz (WIR)
- Pirate Party of Austria (PIRAT)
- Team HC Strache – Alliance for Austria (HC)
- dieBasis Graz (BASIS)
- Free Citizens' Party Graz (FBP)
- The Austrian PARTEI (DÖP)
- Graz in the Heart (GRAZ)

== Opinion polling ==
Outlet	Date	ÖVP	KPÖ	FPÖ	Grüne	SPÖ	NEOS	Others	Lead
2021 local election	26 Sep 2021	25.9	28.8	10.6	17.3	9.5	5.4	2.4	2.9
Ifat	17 Sep 2021	34.1	25.4	11.8	15.0	10.1	2.9	0.7	8.7
unbekannt	5 Sep 2021	33.2	24.6	12.6	14.2	11.8	3.6	–	8.6
OGM	4 Sep 2021	35	20	12	15	11	4	3	15
bmm	16 Aug 2021	36	20	12	14	11	4.9	3.1	16
unbekannt	18 Apr 2021	32	22	11	14	12	7	2	10
Ifat	7 Feb 2021	37	18	15	16	9	5	–	19
OGM	7 Feb 2021	30	24	13	16	9	6	2	6
Ifat	March 2020	38.4	17.7	15.1	16.2	9.6	3	–	20.7
2017 local election	5 Feb 2017	37.8	20.3	15.9	10.5	10.0	3.9	1.5	17.5

== Results ==
Results by party.

Party	Votes	%	+/−	Seats	+/−	Coun.	+/−
Communist Party of Austria (KPÖ)	34,283	28.84	+8.50	15	+5	3	+1
Austrian People's Party (ÖVP)	30,797	25.91	–11.88	13	–6	2	–1
The Greens – The Green Alternative (GRÜNE)	20,593	17.32	+6.81	9	+4	1	±0
Freedom Party of Austria (FPÖ)	12,612	10.61	–5.25	5	–3	1	±0
Social Democratic Party of Austria (SPÖ)	11,325	9.53	–0.52	4	–1	0	±0
NEOS – The New Austria and Liberal Forum (NEOS)	6,447	5.42	+1.48	2	+1	0	±0
dieBasis Graz (BASIS)	1,025	0.86	New	0	New	0	New
Pirate Party of Austria (PIRAT)	468	0.39	–0.70	0	±0	0	±0
Responsibility Earth (ERDE)	429	0.36	New	0	New	0	New
Team HC Strache – Alliance for Austria (HC)	296	0.25	New	0	New	0	New
Graz in the Heart (GRAZ)	226	0.19	New	0	New	0	New
Free Citizens' Party Graz (FBP)	161	0.14	New	0	New	0	New
WiR – Together for Graz (WIR)	110	0.09	New	0	New	0	New
The Austrian PARTEI (DÖP)	110	0.09	New	0	New	0	New
Invalid/blank votes	1,807	–	–	–	–	–	–
Total	120,689	100	–	48	0	7	0
Registered voters/turnout	223,512	54.00	–3.39	–	–	–	–
Source: Stadt Graz

Popular vote
KPÖ	28.84%
ÖVP	25.91%
GRÜNE	17.32%
FPÖ	10.61%
SPÖ	9.53%
NEOS	5.42%
Other	2.37%

Gemeinderat seats
KPÖ	31.25%
ÖVP	27.08%
GRÜNE	18.75%
FPÖ	10.42%
SPÖ	8.33%
NEOS	4.17%

=== Results by district ===
District	KPÖ	ÖVP	Grüne	FPÖ	SPÖ	NEOS
I. Innere Stadt	32.9	21.5	19.5	9.8	5.5	8.3
II. St. Leonhard	33.6	22.4	22.4	6.6	6.4	6.2
III. Geidorf	30.2	23.6	22.3	7.0	7.1	7.4
IV. Lend	34.4	19.8	14.2	12.2	12.6	4.2
V. Gries	37.8	18.8	13.2	14.0	10.9	2.7
VI. Jakomini	37.3	20.3	15.6	10.2	9.2	4.6
VII. Liebenau	24.1	28.0	11.8	16.4	11.9	4.9
VIII. St. Peter	27.0	27.8	20.5	9.0	8.7	5.1
IX. Waltendorf	22.0	33.5	19.1	8.9	7.6	6.8
X. Ries	22.2	32.0	19.5	9.6	8.3	5.8
XI. Mariatrost	22.8	32.9	21.4	7.8	5.9	7.1
XII. Andritz	24.1	29.5	18.6	9.5	10.5	5.6
XIII. Gösting	25.6	28.4	10.0	17.3	13.1	3.5
XIV. Eggenberg	31.6	22.2	14.8	12.7	11.2	5.0
XV. Wetzelsdorf	28.2	25.3	10.3	17.6	12.4	3.6
XVI. Straßgang	25.7	29.3	10.7	16.2	11.5	4.3
XVII. Puntigam	26.1	28.3	9.4	18.2	10.3	5.0
Total	28.8	25.9	17.3	10.6	9.5	5.4
Source: Stadt Graz

== Aftermath ==
The victory of the Communist Party of Austria (KPÖ) was unexpected. Elke Kahr herself expressed surprise at the result: "The preliminary election result is a huge success for us and more than gratifying. I didn't expect to gain that much." While conceding the election, mayor Siegfried Nagl quipped: "You can see that the clocks in Graz run differently than in the rest of Austria."

The KPÖ were expected to take over the mayoralty as no practical majority could be formed to oppose them. The Greens were considered a likely partner, but a third party was required for a majority in the Gemeinderat. Although Nagl ruled out working with the KPÖ during the campaign, the new ÖVP leadership took a noticeably softer stance, raising the possibility of cooperation between the two. The SPÖ and NEOS were also possible partners. Elke Kahr previously voiced her preference for pragmatic cooperation on policy matters and "free play of groups in the Gemeinderat" rather than a fixed coalition pact; the process for electing the mayor could enable the KPÖ to win even without a majority.

After a series of exploratory talks, the SPÖ voted on 22 October to start official coalition talks with the KPÖ and Greens. The three parties presented their coalition program on 13 November. Elke Kahr described a "socially, climate-friendly and democratically transparent" Graz as their goal, with plans to expand community housing, access to transit and education, and transform the city centre into a car-free green space. Kahr will become mayor and reclaim the housing portfolio. Overall, the KPÖ will also hold the finance, health, housing, integration, and education portfolios, with Manfred Eber joining Robert Krotzer as the party's third city councillor. Judith Schwentner will become vice-mayor and councillor for transit and planning. The SPÖ, lacking any city councillors, will chair several committees in the Gemeinderat.

The Gemeinderat convened for its constituent session on 17 November. Elke Kahr was elected mayor with 28 out of 46 votes, becoming the first female mayor of Graz and first communist mayor of an Austrian city. As one KPÖ deputy was absent from the session, Kahr received at least one vote from the opposition.

In FPÖ Graz there was a financial scandal after the election. As a result, the chairman and ex-vice mayor resigned.

Claudia Schönbacher took over the FPÖ in Graz. This helped the judiciary exclude the club chairman of the FPÖ in the municipal council from the club. Federal party chairman Herbert Kickl then expelled Claudia Schönbacher and her team from the Freedom Party. After that, Schönbacher reported several FPÖ politicians, and the Austrian police found Nazi material on several FPÖ city politicians during house searches.

The FPÖ club in Graz municipal council is split, all FPÖ municipal council members founded the club: "(corruption) free municipal council club", KFGK. As of 2022, there was only one FPÖ member of the Graz municipal council.

The investigations of the judiciary are still ongoing (April 2023).
