= 2017 Graz local election =

Vote on 5th of February 2017

- 5 February 2017

All 48 seats in the Gemeindesrat of Graz 25 seats needed for a majority
- Turnout: 127,904 (57.4%) ▼1.9%
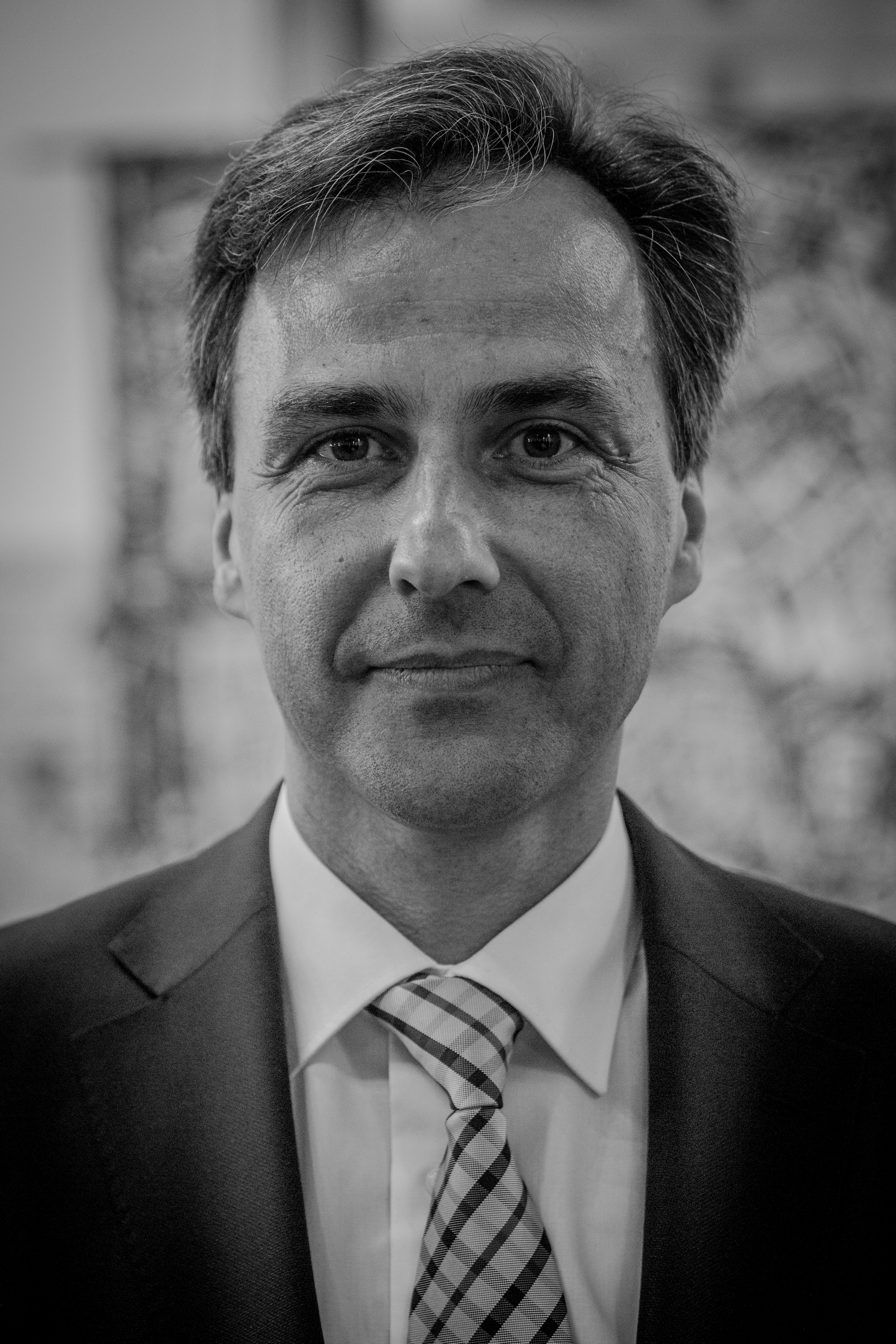

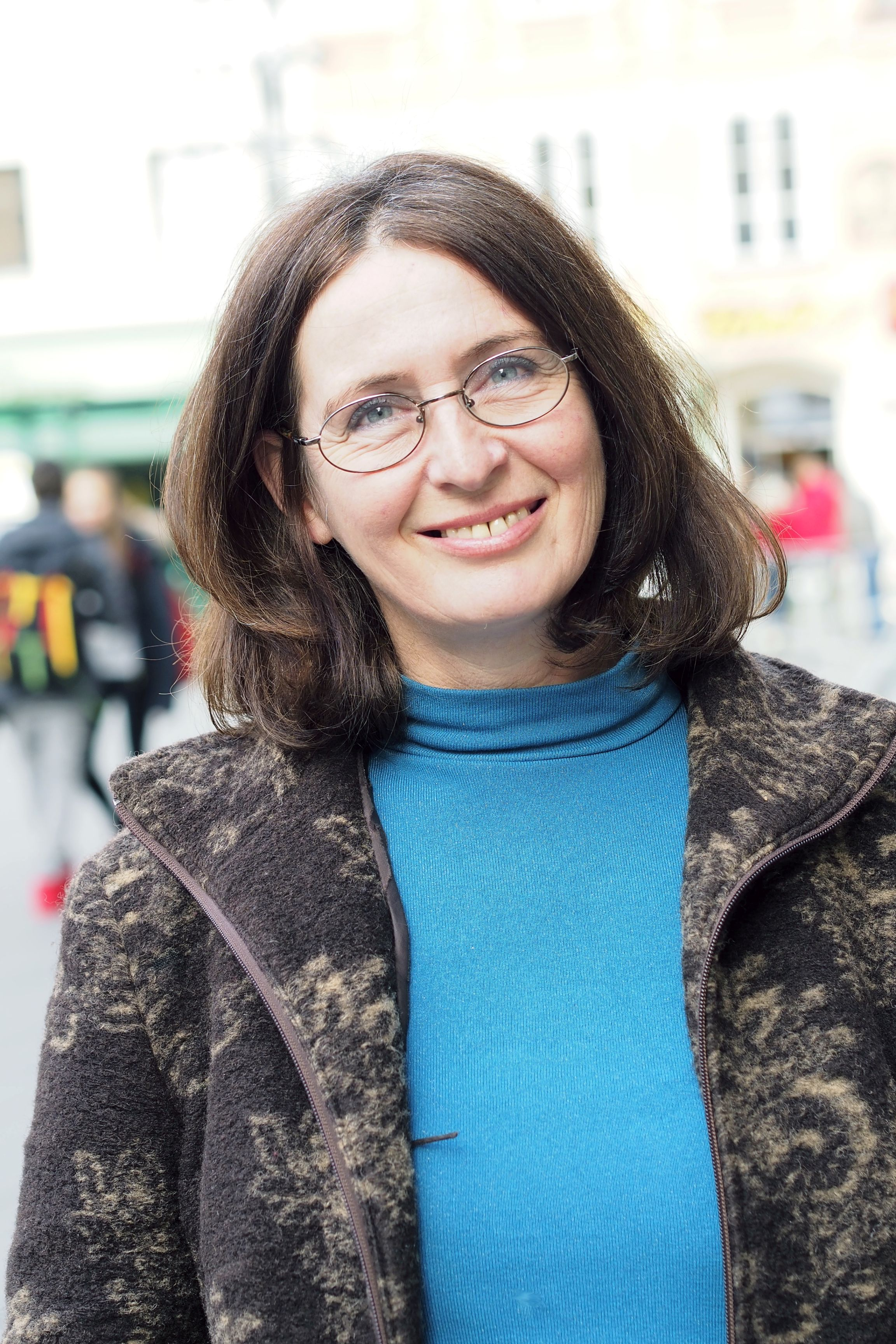
	First party	Second party	Third party
			FPÖ
Leader	Siegfried Nagl	Elke Kahr	Mario Eustacchio
Party	ÖVP	KPÖ	FPÖ
Last election	17 seats, 33.7%	10 seats, 19.9%	7 seats, 13.8%
Seats won	19	10	8
Seat change	▲2	0	▲1
Popular vote	47,639	25,645	19,998
Percentage	37.8%	20.3%	15.9%
Swing	▲4.1%	▲0.5%	▲2.1%
	Fourth party	Fifth party	Sixth party
Leader	Tina Wirnsberger	Michael Ehmann	Niko Swatek
Party	Greens	SPÖ	NEOS
Last election	6 seats, 12.1%	7 seats, 15.3%	Did not exist
Seats won	5	5	1
Seat change	▼1	▼2	▲1
Popular vote	13,254	12,668	4,966
Percentage	10.5%	10.0%	3.9%
Swing	▼1.6%	▼5.3%	New party
- Winning party by municipal district.
Mayor before election
Siegfried Nagl
ÖVP
Elected mayor
Siegfried Nagl
ÖVP

The 2017 Graz local election was held on 5 February 2017 to elect the members of the Gemeindesrat of Graz.

The Austrian People's Party (ÖVP) were the clear winners of the election, remaining the largest party with 38% of the vote. The Communist Party of Austria (KPÖ) remained the second largest party with 20%, while the Freedom Party of Austria (FPÖ) rose to third place. The Social Democratic Party of Austria (SPÖ) and The Greens both suffered losses. NEOS – The New Austria contested their first election in Graz, winning 4% and won one seat.

Incumbent Mayor Siegfried Nagl of the ÖVP was re-elected, while Elke Kahr of the KPÖ remained deputy mayor.

== Background ==
The Styrian constitution mandates that positions in municipal government (city councillors, German: Stadträten) be allocated between parties proportionally in accordance with the share of votes won by each; this is known as Proporz. As such, the government of Graz is a perpetual coalition of all parties that qualify for at least one city councillor.

In the 2012 election, the KPÖ became the second largest party in Graz with 20%. The ÖVP, SPÖ, and Greens all suffered losses, while the FPÖ and Pirate Party made gains. The city government was dominated by the ÖVP with three councillors, while the KPÖ, SPÖ, FPÖ, and Greens won one councillor each.

== Electoral system ==
The 48 seats of the Gemeindesrat of Graz are elected via open list proportional representation with no electoral threshold.

== Contesting parties ==
Name		Ideology	Leader	2012 result		
Name		Ideology	Leader	Votes (%)	Seats	Councillors
ÖVP	Austrian People's Party; Österreichische Volkspartei	Christian democracy	Siegfried Nagl	33.7%	17 / 48	3 / 7
KPÖ	Communist Party of Austria; Kommunistische Partei Österreichs	Communism	Elke Kahr	19.6%	10 / 48	1 / 7
SPÖ	Social Democratic Party of Austria; Sozialdemokratische Partei Österreichs	Social democracy	Michael Ehmann	15.3%	7 / 48	1 / 7
FPÖ	Freedom Party of Austria; Freiheitliche Partei Österreichs	Right-wing populism Euroscepticism	Mario Eustacchio	13.8%	7 / 48	1 / 7
GRÜNE	The Greens – The Green Alternative; Die Grünen – Die Grüne Alternative	Green politics	Tina Wirnsberger	12.1%	5 / 48	1 / 7
PIRAT	Pirate Party of Austria; Piratenpartei Österreichs	Pirate politics	Philip Pacanda	2.7%	1 / 48	

In addition to the parties already represented in the Gemeindesrat, four parties collected enough signatures to be placed on the ballot:

- NEOS – The New Austria (NEOS)
- List WIR – Independent Citizens List Graz (WIR)
- Einsparkraftwerk (ESK)
- Tatjana Petrovic

== Results ==
Results by party.

Party	Votes	%	+/−	Seats	+/−	Coun.	+/−
Austrian People's Party (ÖVP)	47,639	37.79	+4.05	19	+2	3	±0
Communist Party of Austria (KPÖ)	25,645	20.34	+0.48	10	±0	2	+1
Freedom Party of Austria (FPÖ)	19,998	15.86	+2.11	8	+1	1	±0
The Greens – The Green Alternative (GRÜNE)	13,254	10.51	–1.63	5	–1	1	±0
Social Democratic Party of Austria (SPÖ)	12,668	10.05	–5.26	5	–2	0	–1
NEOS – The New Austria and Liberal Forum (NEOS)	4,966	3.94	New	1	New	0	New
Pirate Party of Austria (PIRAT)	1,368	1.09	–1.61	0	–1	0	±0
List WIR – Independent Citizens List Graz (WIR)	250	0.20	New	0	New	0	New
Einsparkraftwerk (ESK)	166	0.13	–0.06	0	±0	0	±0
Tatjana Petrovic	115	0.09	New	0	New	0	New
Invalid/blank votes	1,835	–	–	–	–	–	–
Total	127,904	100	–	48	0	7	0
Registered voters/turnout	222,856	57.39	+1.92	–	–	–	–
Source: Stadt Graz

Popular vote
ÖVP	37.79%
KPÖ	20.34%
FPÖ	15.86%
GRÜNE	10.51%
SPÖ	10.05%
NEOS	3.94%
Other	1.51%

Gemeindesrat seats
ÖVP	39.58%
KPÖ	20.83%
FPÖ	16.67%
GRÜNE	10.42%
SPÖ	10.42%
NEOS	2.08%

=== Results by district ===
District	ÖVP	KPÖ	FPÖ	Grüne	SPÖ	NEOS	Others	Turnout
I. Innere Stadt	33.7	28.6	11.4	13.8	4.7	5.2	2.6	59.8
II. St. Leonhard	34.2	26.7	9.7	15.1	6.2	5.8	2.4	61.9
III. Geidorf	36.5	23.8	10.5	14.2	7.4	5.9	1.8	61.7
IV. Lend	27.6	25.7	18.4	9.4	14.5	3.0	1.5	49.7
V. Gries	27.1	28.3	19.1	8.6	12.1	3.0	1.8	43.6
VI. Jakomini	30.4	27.3	14.5	11.6	9.9	4.5	1.9	53.9
VII. Liebenau	42.2	15.1	21.1	5.4	12.6	2.5	1.0	54.9
VIII. St. Peter	42.1	18.5	13.2	13.0	8.2	3.6	1.4	67.1
IX. Waltendorf	48.1	15.3	13.2	10.7	6.6	4.3	1.8	68.8
X. Ries	47.4	15.8	13.6	10.8	7.4	3.9	1.1	64.4
XI. Mariatrost	47.9	16.1	11.5	12.2	5.7	5.3	1.2	68.9
XII. Andritz	44.9	15.3	14.9	9.8	9.6	4.1	1.4	68.2
XIII. Gösting	37.2	16.1	23.1	6.1	14.1	2.3	1.1	54.2
XIV. Eggenberg	34.3	20.1	21.4	8.0	12.1	2.9	1.2	54.0
XV. Wetzelsdorf	37.2	16.1	24.3	5.2	13.6	2.5	1.1	55.2
XVI. Straßgang	40.6	12.8	23.1	5.1	14.5	2.9	1.0	57.5
XVII. Puntigam	38.0	15.5	25.4	5.5	11.7	2.5	1.5	50.8
Total	37.8	20.3	15.9	10.5	10.1	3.9	1.5	57.4
Source: Stadt Graz
