= Districts of Graz =

Graz is composed of 17 districts, which, like Vienna, are numbered for the sake of convenience although they all have their own names. Legally, they are not really districts, but rather Katastralgemeinden.

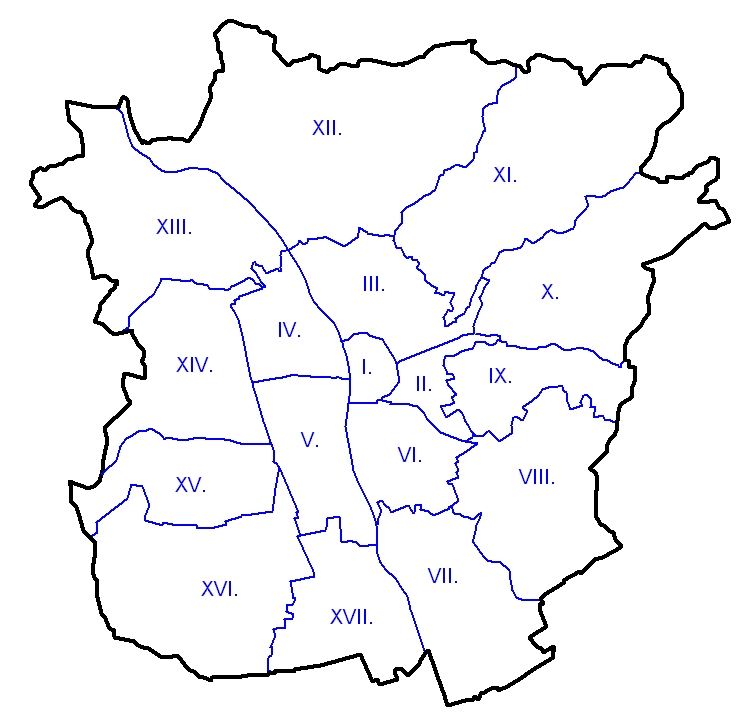
The 17 Graz Districts

I. Innere Stadt
II. St. Leonhard
III. Geidorf
IV. Lend
V. Gries
VI. Jakomini
VII. Liebenau
VIII. St. Peter
IX. Waltendorf
X. Ries
XI. Mariatrost
XII. Andritz
XIII. Gösting
XIV. Eggenberg
XV. Wetzelsdorf
XVI. Straßgang
XVII. Puntigam
