= Privilegiertes uniformiertes Grazer Bürgerkorps =

The privilegierte uniformierte Grazer Bürgerkorps, founded in 1280 to protect the city of Graz, is the oldest organization in the Styrian capital. Its motto is "Für Treue, Mut und Bürgersinn" ("For loyalty, courage and citizenship"). The corps' headquarters is at the Garrison Church in the basement (the former canteen) of the Brothers Hospitallers building in Graz.

== History ==
=== Before World War II ===
When cities developed as places with special rights and freedoms during the Middle Ages, Bürgerwehren, Bürgerkorps or Bürgergarden were created for fortification, defense and to maintain order. The Grazer Bürgerkorps (the last remaining branch of the Bürgerwehr Graz) traces its history to 1280, when it was founded by King Rudolf I of Habsburg. During the 18th-century rule of Maria Theresa, standing armies began to appropriate these tasks and the original groups assumed a ceremonial role.

Brewmaster Richard Seebacher (1717-1805) revived a corps of hunters. At the end of the 18th century, three civil corps (the Hunter Corps, the Grenadier Corps and the Cavalry Corps) were unified in Graz.

The Graz garrison fought in the Napoleonic Wars, and citizen corps took over the city's protection. Maria Theresa of Naples and Sicily, the second wife of Emperor Francis II and the first empress of Austria, donated a campaign streamer. At the war's height in 1809, the Graz citizen corps numbered 1,300 members. Its Schloßberg clock and bell towers were spared by the French after the payment of a ransom by its citizens.

The corps' weaponry evolved from lances and halberds to bayonets and guns. With the introduction of conscription in 1866, the Grazer Bürgerkorps was incorporated into the defense of the monarchy to guard the city's gunpowder and food and to provide security. The Bürgergarde, in its bearskin uniforms, also marched in parades. To commemorate the 600th anniversary of the Habsburg dynasty on 1 July 1883 in Graz, where Emperor Franz Joseph I appeared, the Grazer Bürgerkorps provided music and an honor guard.

During World War I, the Grazer Bürgerkorps sent a 200-man company to the borders of the empire. Although it was dissolved in November 1919, after the signing of the Treaty of St. Germain, it was revived in 1923 as a club.

=== After the war ===
In 1953, after the end of World War II, reconstruction of the Grazer Bürgerkorps began. Its membership initially increased, peaking in 1966. The group's popularity then declined, despite a 1978 Civil Corps exhibition at the Styrian Armoury for Graz' 850th anniversary. For the corps' 700th anniversary, membership began to increase again and a handbook was published.

In 1984, the Styrian government and the mayor of Graz contributed to the purchase of Karabiner 98k rifles for the corps. With the increase in membership, a larger headquarters was needed for its monthly meetings. In 1987 (about 20 years after the dedication of its last flag at the Freiheitsplatz), the Grazer Bürgerkorps dedicated a new corps flag. The hand-painted silk flag (similar to the banner of the Imperial Army of 1836) was donated to the corps. In 2002 Mannlicher M1895 rifles replaced the corps' Karabiner 98ks, which were retired to ceremonial use. The corps, a member of the Vereinigung der Traditionsverbände Mitteleuropas (VTM), moved to a new location in late 2008.

== Equipment ==
The corps uniform is similar to the pre-1911 version, in steel green rather than black. Although its 1836 bearskin hats were replaced by smaller ones in 1954, caps from 1849 are still in use.

The Grazer Bürgerkorps has Werndl–Holub rifles with bayonets for ceremonial use, in addition to the Mannlicher M1895s. Grenadiers wear sabres dating back to 1765, and officers wear 1861 infantry sabres.
