= Liebenauer Stadium =

Football stadium in Graz, Styria, Austria

Stadium Graz-Liebenau
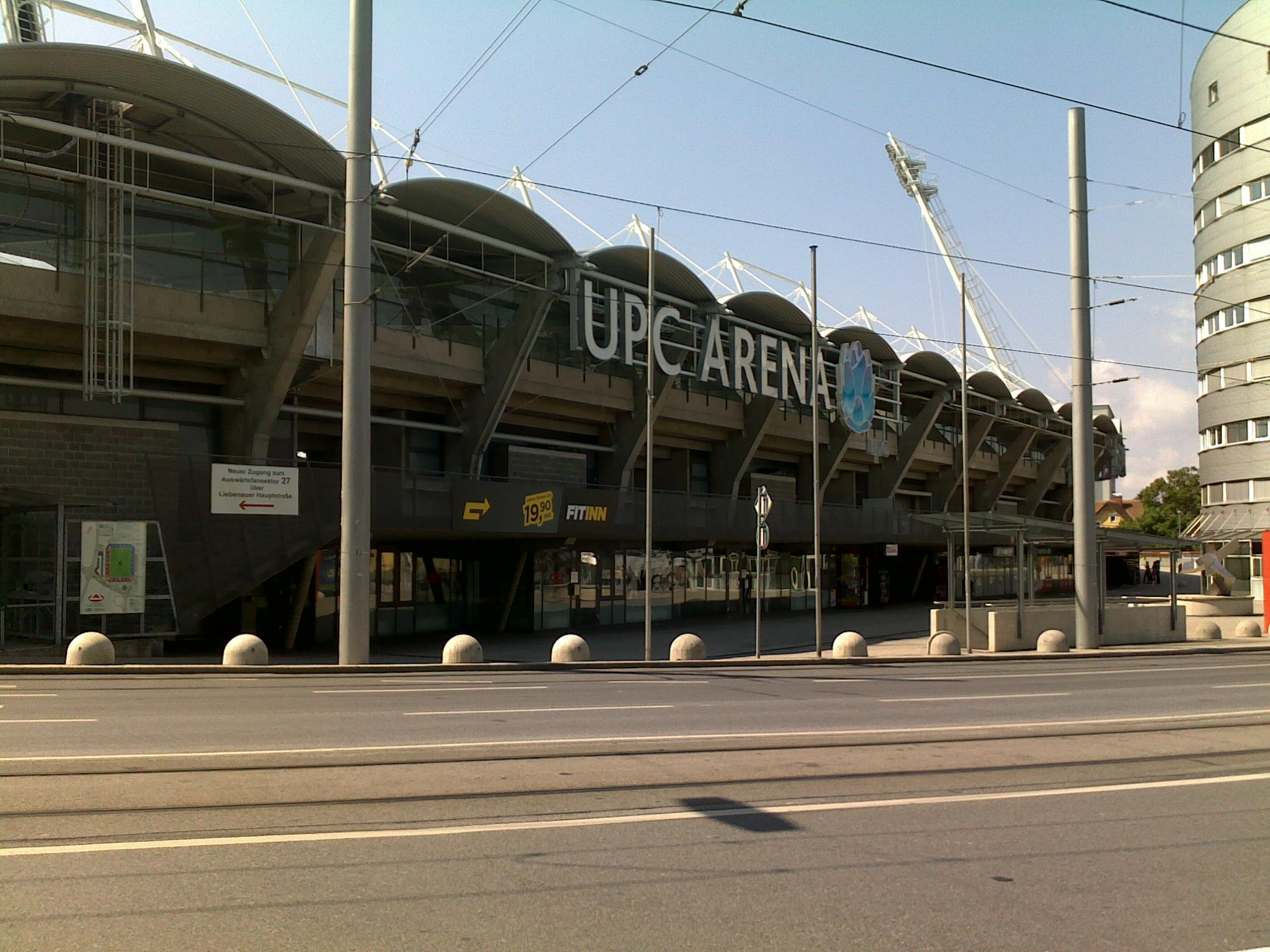
- Interactive map of Stadium Graz-Liebenau
- Former names: Arnold Schwarzenegger-Stadion (1995–2005); Stadion Graz-Liebenau (2005–2006); UPC-Arena (2006–2016); Merkur-Arena (2016–2026)
- Location: Ivica-Osim-Platz 1; 8041 Graz-Liebenau; Austria
- Coordinates: 47°02′46″N 15°27′16″E
- Owner: Stadion Liebenau Betriebs GmbH
- Operator: City of Graz
- Capacity: 16,364 (domestic games); 15,323 (international games)
- Surface: Natural grass with under-soil heating
- Field size: 105 x 68 m (114.8 x 74.4 yd)

Construction
- Groundbreaking: 9 January 1995; 31 years ago
- Opened: 9 July 1997; 29 years ago

Tenants
- Sturm Graz; Grazer AK

Website
- https://mcg.at/locations/merkur-arena/#

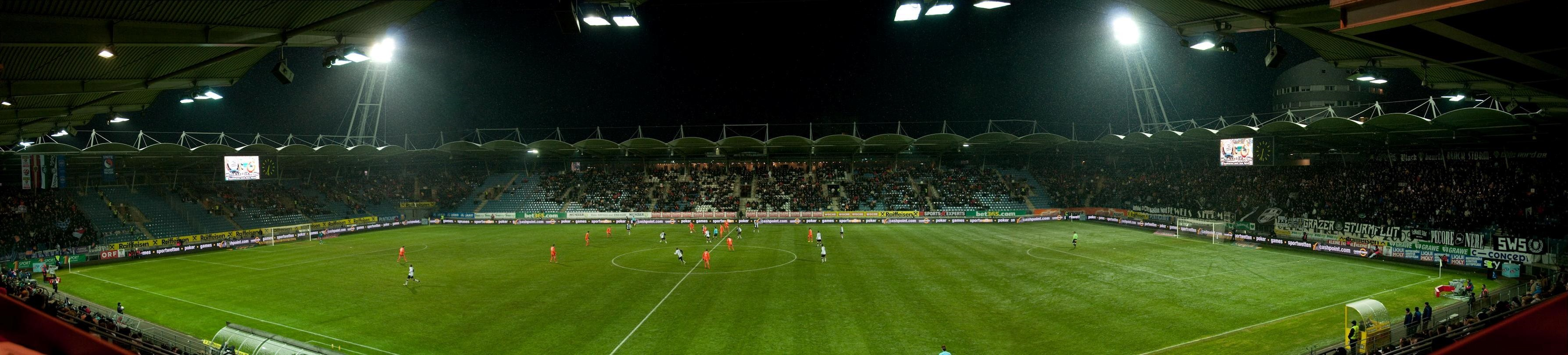
Panorama of the Arena

The Stadium Graz-Liebenau, formerly known as the Arnold Schwarzenegger Stadium, UPC-Arena and Merkur-Arena, is a football stadium in the Liebenau area of Graz, Styria, Austria. The ground is the home of the football clubs SK Sturm Graz and Grazer AK.

== History ==
The first Liebenau Stadion was built before World War II. In the 1950s it was renovated and expanded with a skating rink (now home of the ice hockey team Graz 99ers) and an indoor pool. A motorcycle speedway track was constructed around the pitch and hosted qualifying rounds of the Speedway World Championship in 1965 and 1970. In the 1970s it became home ground of the big football clubs of Graz, SK Sturm and Grazer AK. The stadium was demolished to make way for a new one.

In 1996, construction began on the new stadium, which was to be named after world-renowned bodybuilder and actor Arnold Schwarzenegger, who was born near Graz. It was built from 1996 to early 1997 and is owned by Stadion Liebenau Betriebs GmbH. It opened with a game between Grazer AK and Sturm Graz on 9 July 1997 which ended 4–0 to the latter.

In December 2005, when Schwarzenegger, by then governor of the U.S. state of California, did not stop the execution of American gangster and co-founder of the notorious Crips gang Stanley Williams, an intense discussion in his hometown began about what to do with the stadium that bore his name. After some days, Schwarzenegger revoked the city of Graz's right to the use of his name, ending the debate. On the night of 26 December 2005 the name was removed from the stadium. The remaining part Stadion Graz-Liebenau was removed on 17 February 2006 and on 18 February 2006 the stadium was renamed to UPC-Arena. In March 2016 the Austrian insurance company Merkur Versicherung secured the rights to bear a name and the stadium was renamed to Merkur-Arena, this name remained in effect until March 2026. Currently, the stadium is once again known by its original name, Stadion Graz-Liebenau.

In 2023, the city of Graz renamed the forecourt of the Merkur Arena to Ivica-Osim-Platz ('Ivica-Osim-Square') in the memory of Ivica Osim, a long time player and coach of Sturm Graz, who had died the previous year.

== Facts ==
The Merkur-Arena has an official capacity of 15,400 in 27 sectors. At Champions League games of the SK Sturm Graz, some additional platforms were built so that the stadium had a capacity of 16,000 spectators. Furthermore, the stadium has a wheelchair area. The first game in the "new" UPC-Arena was the 125th derby between SK Sturm Graz and Grazer AK (4:0). The field equipped with undersoil heating has a size of 105 x 68 metres.

The stadium hosted a World Cup qualifier between Austria and Faroe Islands on 5 September 2009 which ended in 3–1 victory for the home team. It also hosted an international friendly between England and Japan on 30 May 2010. England had been training in Irdning, a small village in the Austrian Alps, in preparation for the 2010 FIFA World Cup. The match ended 2–1 to England, courtesy of two own goals by Japan.

== Average attendance ==
The average season attendances from league matches held at the Merkur-Arena for Grazer AK and SK Sturm Graz.

Season	Grazer AK	SK Sturm Graz
1997–98	8,772	9,167
1998–99	7,040	10,972
1999–2000	6,584	11,123
2000–01	5,631	10,831
2001–02	7,294	10,057
2002–03	6,919	7,374
2003–04	9,007	7,836
2004–05	8,396	6,739
2005–06	7,372	8,330
2006–07	5,807	9,546
2007–08	2,792 *	12,015
2008–09	2,590	12,830
2009–10	1,800	11,726
2010–11	2,548	11,875
2011–12	3,618	10,827
2012–13	1,809 **	10,682

* Relegated to 3rd league. ** Dissolved after 6 matches.

Since 2012 SK Sturm Graz continuously played in the stadium, while GAK returned 2019 when they reached the 2nd league again.

== Sponsors ==
From 2006 to 2016 the stadium was sponsored by UPC Austria, and was known as the UPC-Arena

Merkur Versicherung won the sponsorship rights from 2016, the contract lasted for 10 years until 2026.

== See also ==
- List of football stadiums in Austria
- Lists of stadiums
