= Eggenberg (Graz) =

Coordinates: 47°04′26″N 15°23′29″E

- 14th city district of Graz
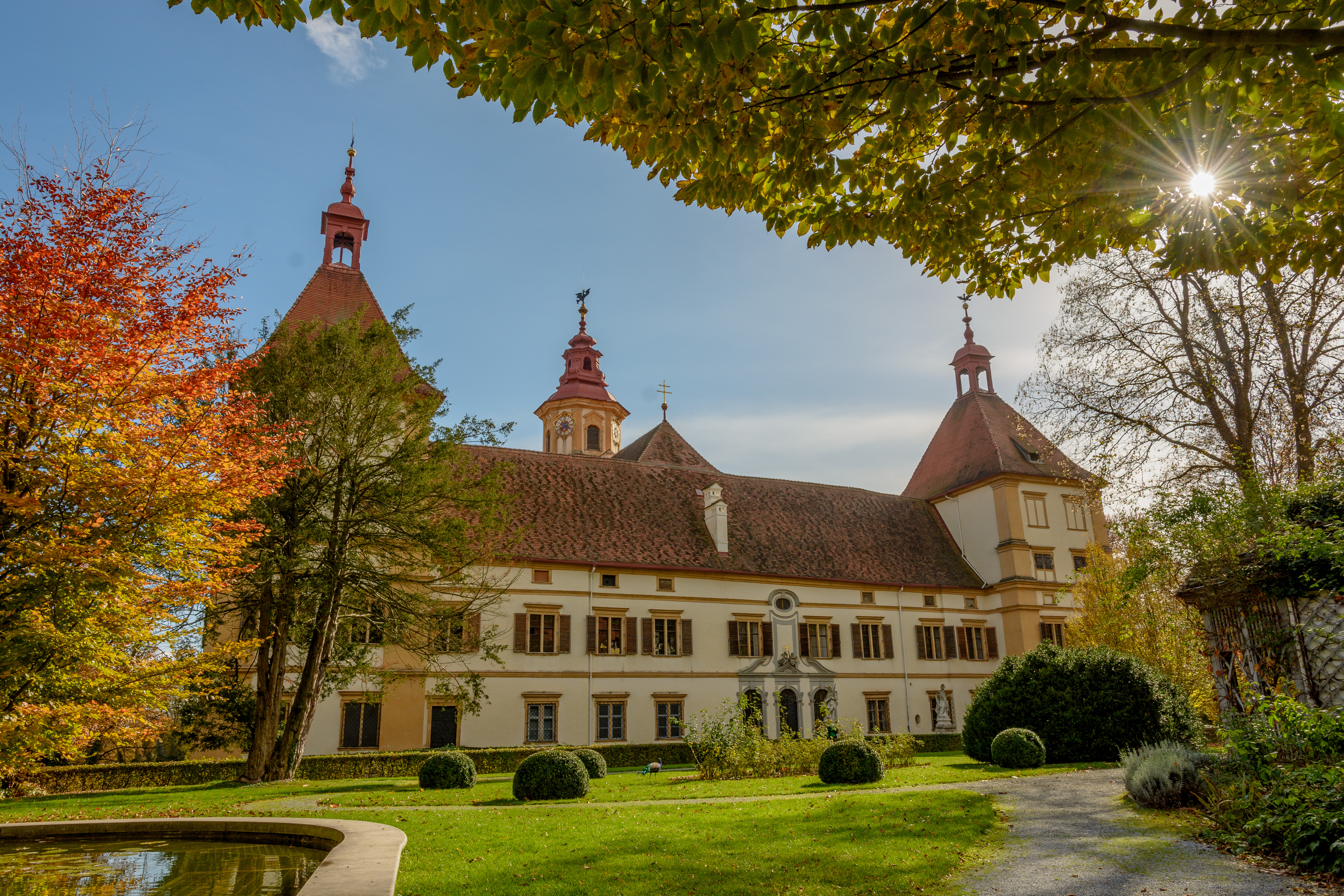
- The Eggenberg palace in 2003.
- Interactive map of Eggenberg
- Country: Austria
- Province: Styria
- Statutory city: Graz

Area
  - Total: 7.79 km^{2} (3.01 sq mi)

Population (2023)
  - Total: 23,942
  - Density: 3,070/km^{2} (7,960/sq mi)
- Postal codes: 8020, 8051, 8052, 8053

Eggenberg (German: [ˈɛgn̩ˌbɛʁk]) is the 14th city district of Graz in the Austrian province of Styria. It borders to the districts of Lend and Gries in the east and to the Plabutsch mountain in the west. The name originates from the Eggenberg palace and its founding family the House of Eggenberg.

== History ==
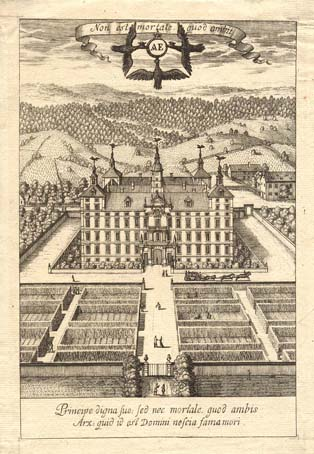
The Eggenberg palace. Copper engraving by Andreas Trost, before 1700.

The district is named after the Eggenbergers who built their medieval residence sometime after 1460 and which was expanded starting in 1625 to become Eggenberg palace. In 2010 the palace was added to the UNESCO World Cultural Heritage Site listing for Graz's "Old Town". Early discoveries indicate a settlement since the early Stone Age. In Algersdorf two grave fields from the Roman age were found. The Alte Poststraße can be traced back to the Roman age as well. In the Middle Ages and up to the 19th century the landscape was dominated by agriculture and cultivating wineyards on the Plabutsch hillside. In locality Beierdorf near Graz - nowadays belonging to Eggenberg - the Baierdorf manor was situated.

In 1850 the community of Eggenberg was formed. It was subdivided into parts called Katastralgemeinde with the names Algersdorf, Beierdorf and Wetzelsdorf. Additionally there were the localities of Plawutsch and Krottendorf (now belonging to Wetzelsdorf).

It gradually changed from a peasant palace village towards a working class community because of the brewery Reininghaus since 1853 and the expansion of the industrial area around the railway station. This is also demonstrated by the erection of the working class suburb of Neu-Algersdorf in the late 19th century.

In 1906 Eggenberg got the market right. Although Wetzelsdorf became independent in 1914 Eggenberg still was the most populous market town in Austria with about 15000 inhabitants during the interwar period.

In the course of the Austrian Civil War in 1934 there were bitter fights between members of the Schutzbund and workers against police and military. In the socialdemocatic dominated Eggenberg the headquarters of the Konsum consumers' cooperative was located. There were several people killed and wounded and in the Konsum building alone 130 prisoners captured.

After the so-called "Anschluß" of Austria in 1938 Eggenberg became a district of Graz.

Around the last third of the 20th century there were a lot of social and educational developments in the district due to the building of the ASKÖ-Sport stadium, the pedagogic academy (1969), the big indoor and outdoor swimming pool (1974), the Unfallkrankenhaus clinic (1981) and the LKH - West clinic (2002).

In the year 2009, the Graz International Bilingual School, a prominent bilingual Austrian Gymnasium, relocated to the building of the pedagogy academy next to the Eggenberg palace.

== Sights ==
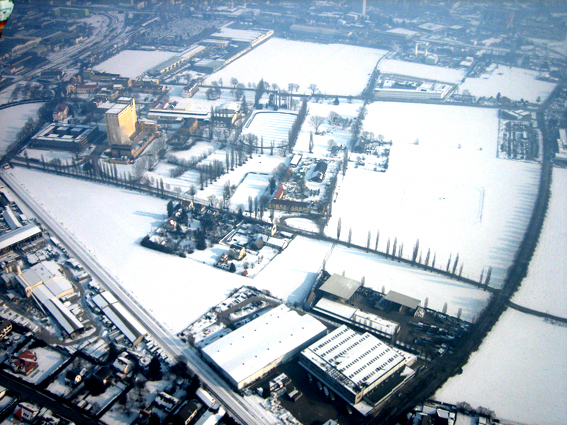
Reininghaus brewery area, winter 2006.

- Eggenberg palace
- Reininghaus brewery area
- Algersdorf palace

== Economy, schools and traffic ==
- Industrial facilities in the eastern region (near the Railway station)
- "Kooperative Mittelschule" Algersdorf (highschool)
- Private school of the Schulschwestern (elementary school, highschool)
- Pedagogical Academy of the Graz-Seckau diocese (until Autumn 2009)
- University of Applied Sciences Joanneum
- Up to 1973 it was planned to have the Pyhrn Autobahn motorway go straight through Eggenberg. This was spared to the district by the construction of the Plabutsch tunnel.
- Tram lines number 1 and 7. The line number 1 was erected in 1900.
- Graz International Bilingual School (from 2009 onwards)

== Literature ==
Dienes, Gerhard M.; Kubinzky, Karl A.; et al. (1999). Eggenberg. Geschichte und Alltag (in German). Graz: Stadtmuseum Graz. ISBN 3-900764-22-0.
