= Puntigam =

Coordinates: 47°01′44″N 15°25′34″E

- 17th city district of Graz
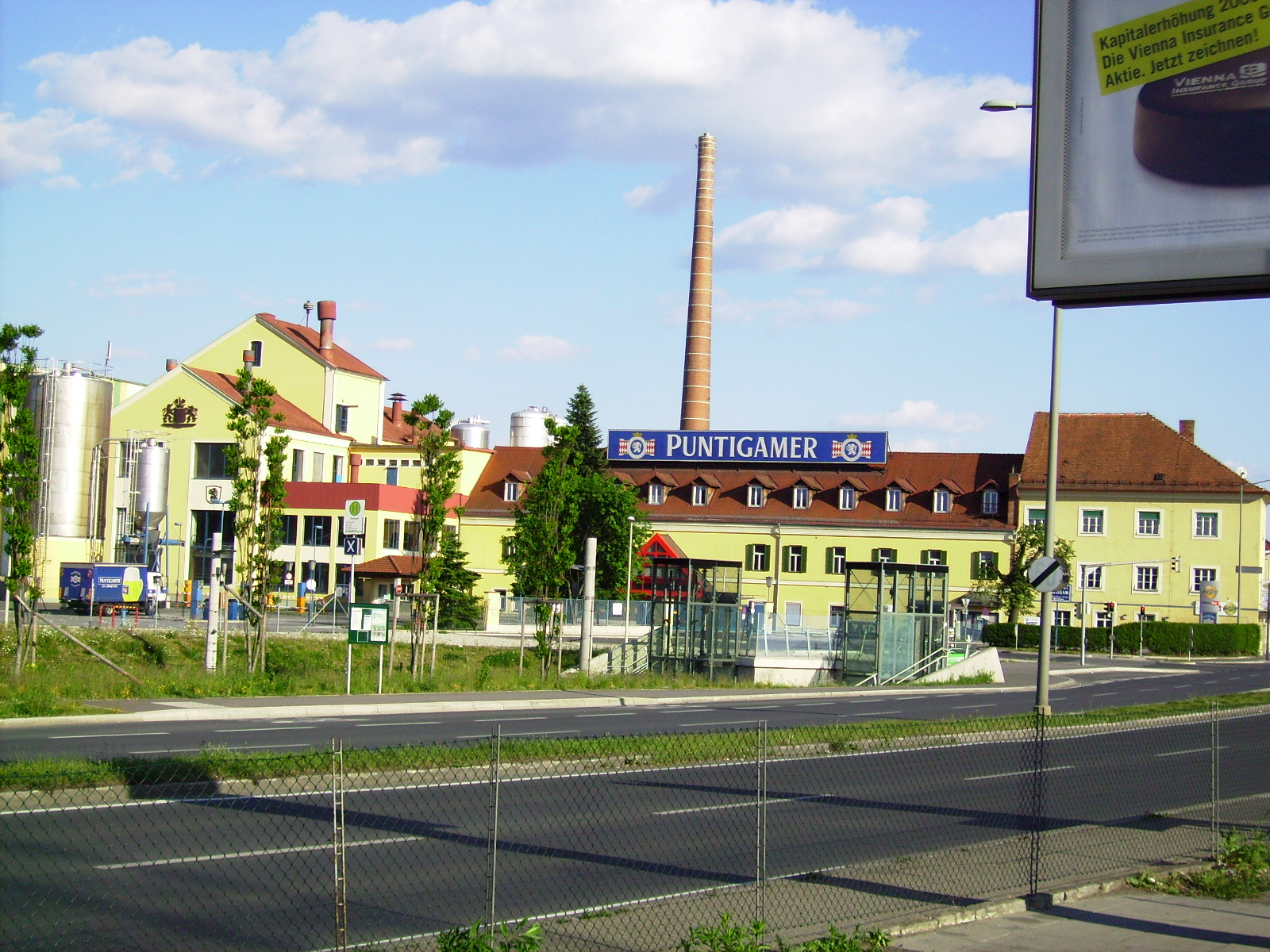
- The brewery Puntigam
- Interactive map of Puntigam
- Country: Austria
- Province: Styria
- Statutory city: Graz

Area
  - Total: 6.18 km^{2} (2.39 sq mi)

Population (2023)
  - Total: 10,251
  - Density: 1,660/km^{2} (4,300/sq mi)
- Postal code: 8020, 8054, 8055, 8073

Puntigam (German: [ˈpʊntiɡam]) is the 17th and newest city district of Graz, in the Austrian province of Styria. A big part of the industry of Graz is situated here. As of 2023, there are about 10.251 people living in an area of 6.18 km².

== History ==
The name Puntigam is originally a family name. It originates from the family who since the early modern era owned a mansion with an inn and a brewery in this area. The brewery Puntigam developed out of this in the 19th century. Together with the village Straßgang, Puntigam became the 16th city district of Graz, Straßgang, in 1938. In 1988, the district Puntigam was broken up from the 16th district Straßgang with small parts of the 5th district Gries and became the new 17th district.

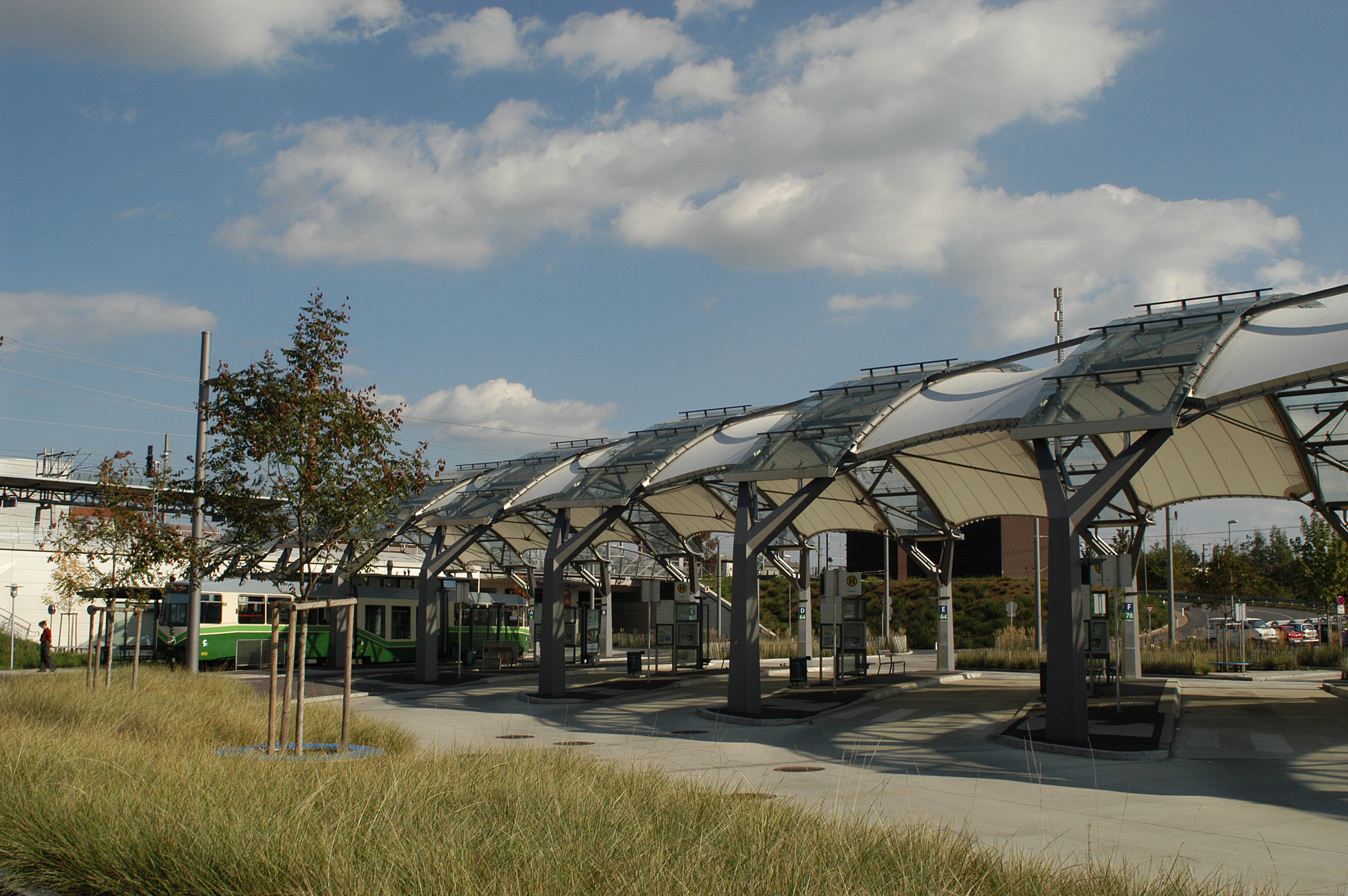
The local traffic connection Puntigam.

Since the beginnings of the trams in Graz the line number 5 leads to Puntigam. Until 2006, the line number 5 reversed at the brewery Puntigam coming from Andritz. At the newly created local traffic connection Puntigam one can change to the bus lines 62, 64, 78 and 80. It is also planned to become a station of the new Koralmbahn Railway in about 2025.

Coming from Puntigam one can get via the Weblinger Gürtel street towards the rotary Webling which is located at the Pyhrn Autobahn (A9) motorway. From there one can quickly reach the motorway rotary Graz West at the crossing of the motorways A2 and A9.

== Economy ==
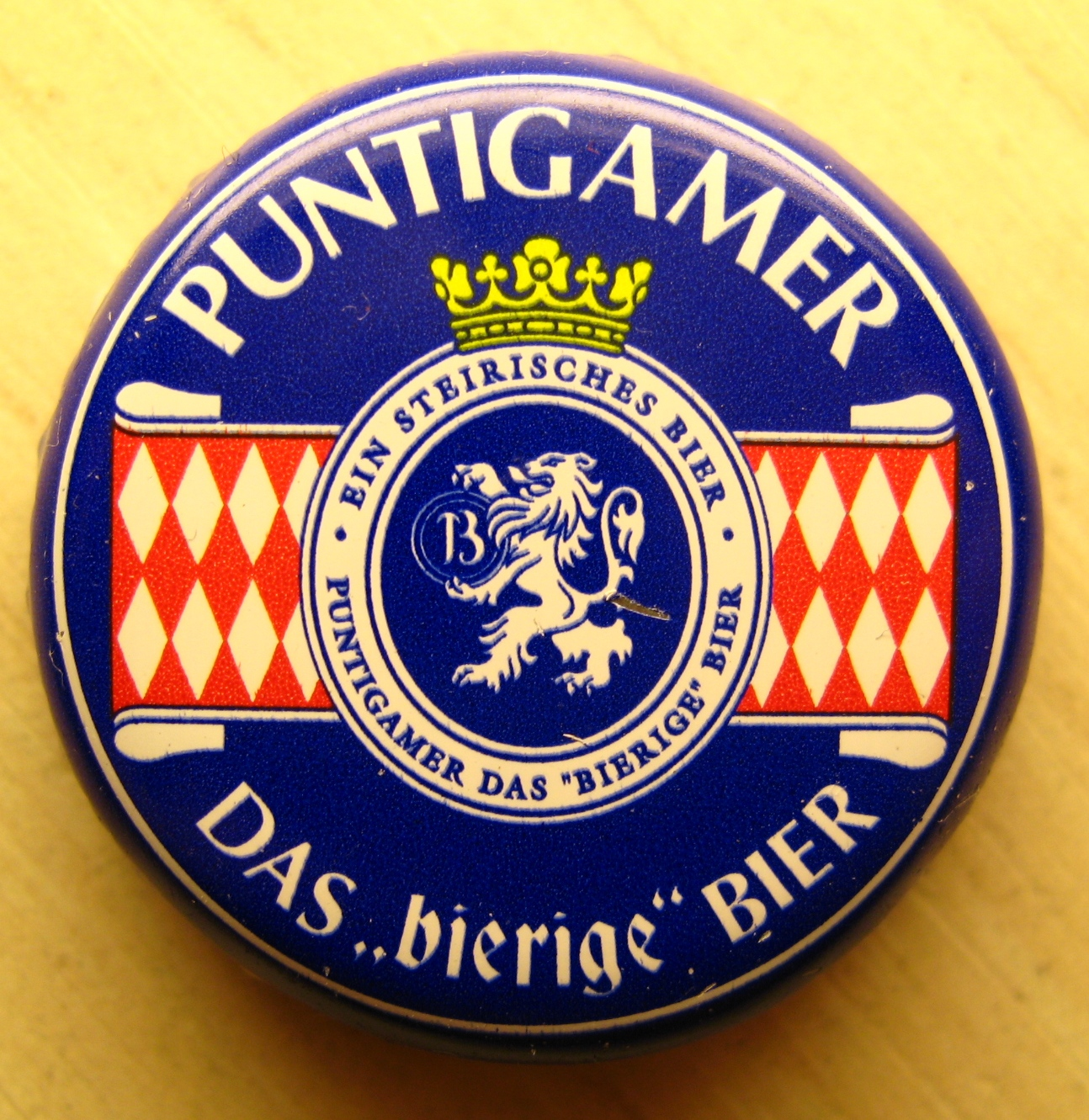
Crown cap of a Puntigamer beer.

For generations, the Puch factories are the dominant part of the economy in Puntigam and Liebenau. The brewery Puntigam is one of the most successful breweries in Austria. Even today a big part of the industry of Graz is situated in Puntigam. There are for example the firms Gowi Spielwaren (toys), Ankünder Außenwerbung (advertising), Spar Austria (retail) as well as recycling companies and others.

== Sights ==
- Brewery Puntigam
- Church St. Leopold
- Puch factories

== Schools ==
- Kindergarten Puntigam
- Elementary school Puntigam
- Cooperative Mittelschule Puntigam
- Polytechnical school Graz
- Chemistry engineer's school Graz

== Literature ==
- Bernadette Pfingstl, Josef Pfingstl und Sabine Holasek: 125 Jahre Betriebsfeuerwehr Puntigam. Graz 1999. (Festschrift)
