= Styrian Armoury =

Historic armoury and museum in Graz, Austria

- Landeszeughaus
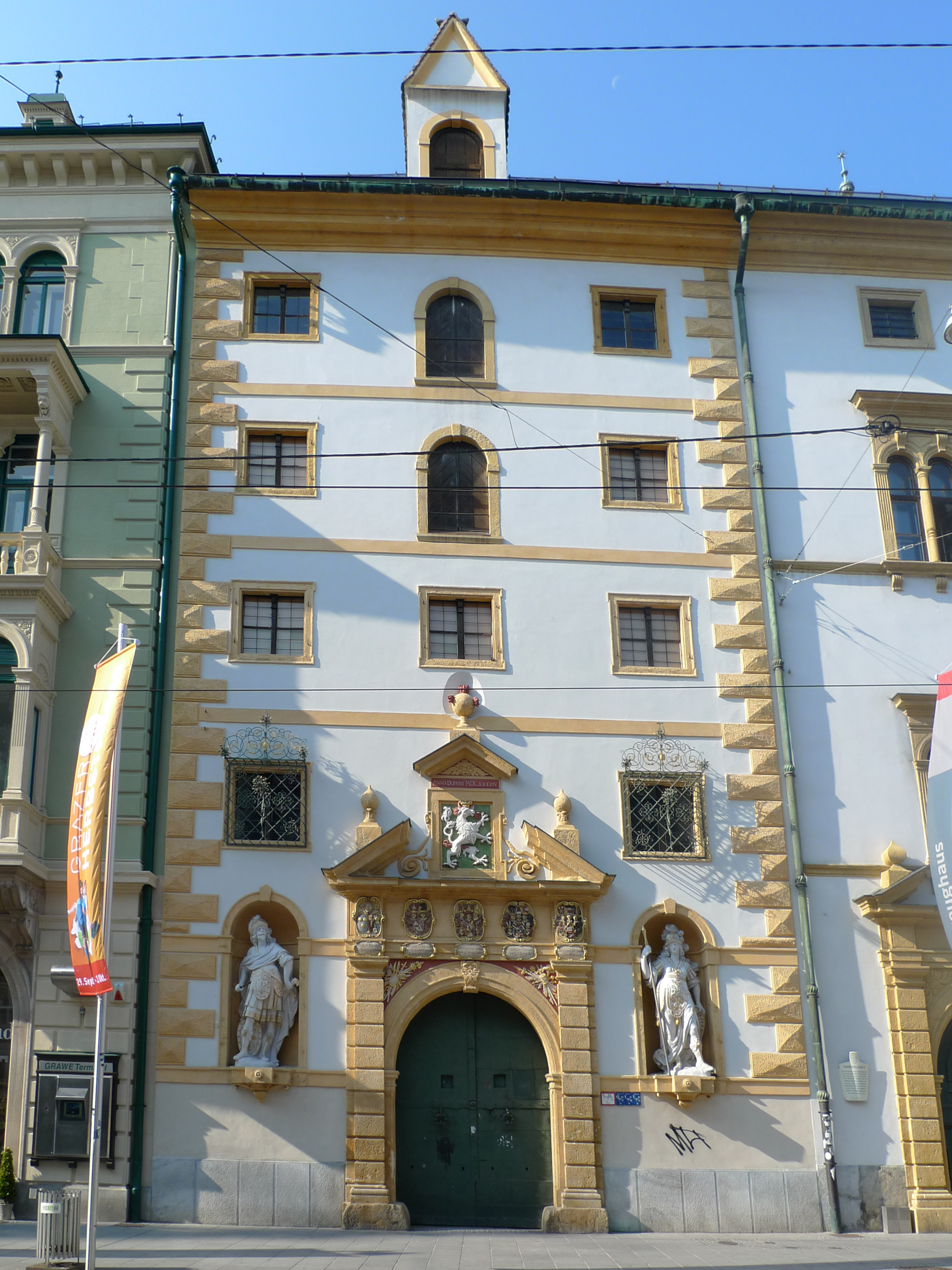
- Location: Graz, Austria
- Coordinates: 47.070°N 15.440°E
- Type: Armoury

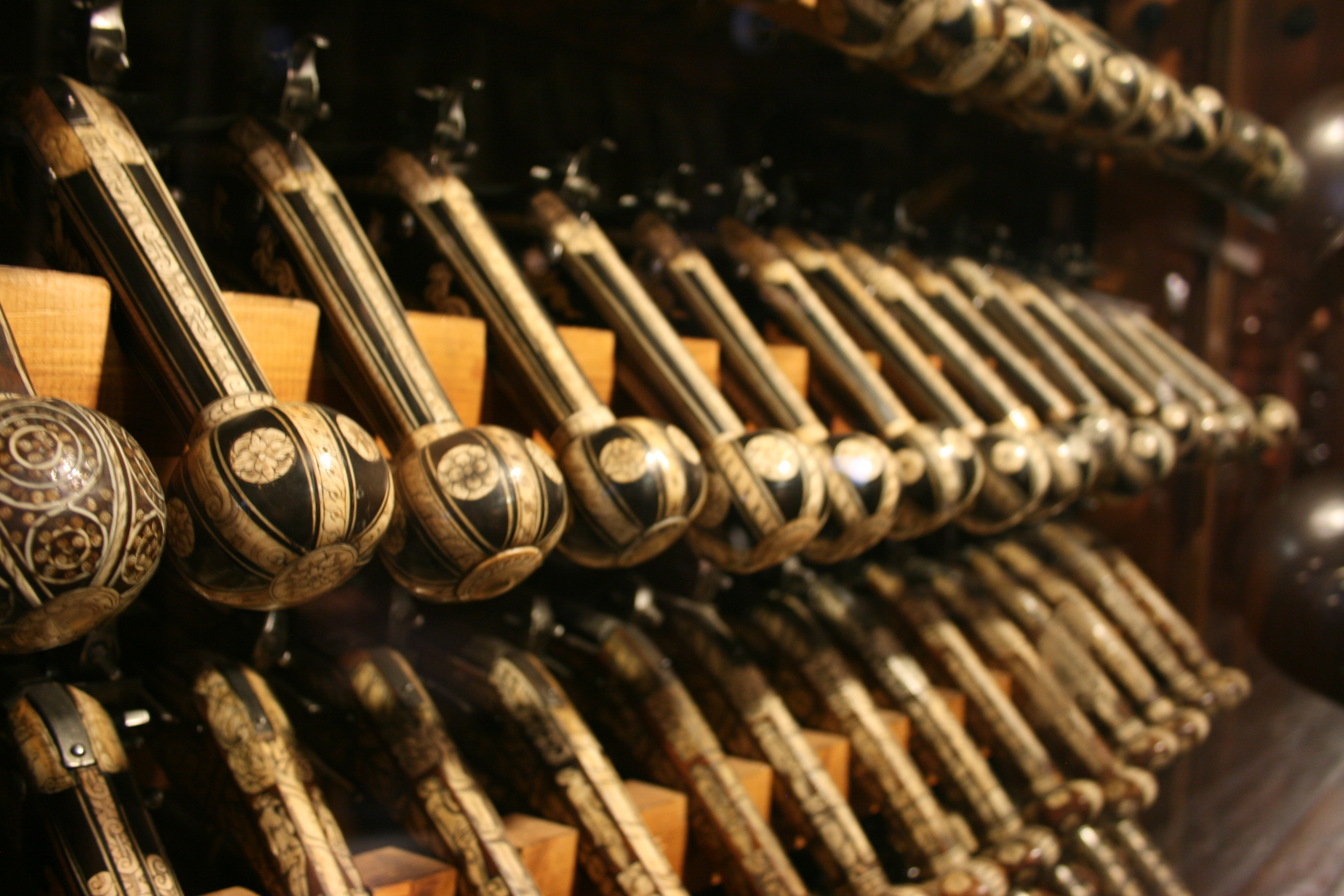
decorated pistols

The Styrian Armoury (German: Landeszeughaus), in the Austrian city of Graz, is the world's largest historic armoury and attracts visitors from all over the world. It holds approximately 32,000 pieces of weaponry, tools, suits of armour for battle and ones for parades.

Between the 15th century and the 18th century, Styria was on the front line of almost continuous conflict with the Ottoman Empire and with rebels in Hungary. In order to defend itself it needed troops and these troops needed equipment. The Styrian Armoury results from the resulting need to store large quantities of armour and weapons, and was built from 1642 - 1645 by a Tyrolean architect called Antonio Solar.

After about 100 years in use, Austrian empress Maria Theresia wanted to close down the armoury, as part of her centralisation of the defence of Austria. Nevertheless, Styria petitioned for the ongoing existence of the armoury for both practical and sentimental reasons. Their petition was accepted and the Armoury was left intact, but largely decommissioned.

During World War II, the entire contents were moved to safety in three castles in remote parts of Styria, and no losses were recorded. After the end of the war, the objects were brought back into the undamaged original building.

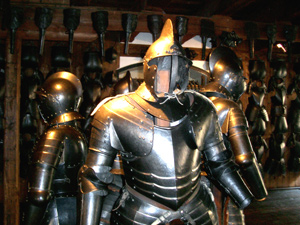
Armour in the Armory

The armoury is situated in Graz's Inner City, a few steps from Hauptplatz at Herrengasse Nr. 16. The armoury is open six days a week, closed Mondays, throughout the year. In November, it can only be visited through guided tours.
