= Lend (Graz) =

Coordinates: 47.078°N 15.426°E

- 4th city district of Graz
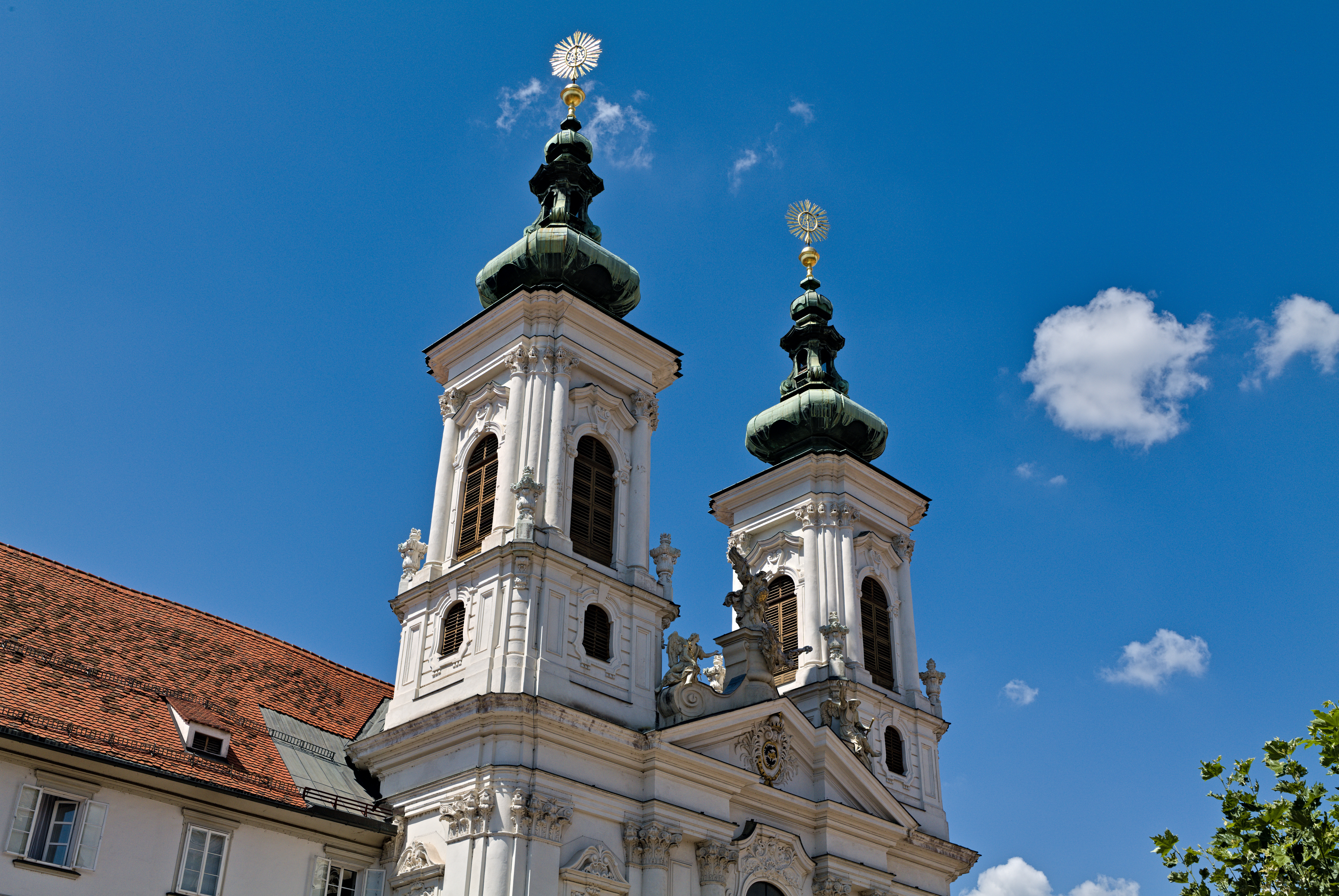
- Church Mariahilf
- Interactive map of Lend
- Country: Austria
- Province: Styria
- Statutory city: Graz

Area
  - Total: 3.70 km^{2} (1.43 sq mi)

Population (2023)
  - Total: 32,859
  - Density: 8,880/km^{2} (23,000/sq mi)

Lend (German pronunciation: [lɛnt]) is the 4th district of the Austrian city of Graz. It is located on the west bank of the Mur and north of the district Gries and west of the district Innere Stadt and the Schloßberg.

It has a population of 32,859 (in 2023) and covers an area of 3.7 square kilometres. The postal codes of Lend are 8020 and 8051.

== Points of interest ==
- Kalvarienbergkirche and Kalvarienberg
- Mariahilfer Kirche
- Grazer Kunsthaus
- Grazer Orpheum, a small theater built in 1899
