= Geidorf =

Coordinates: 47°4′56″N 15°26′26″E

- 3rd city district of Graz
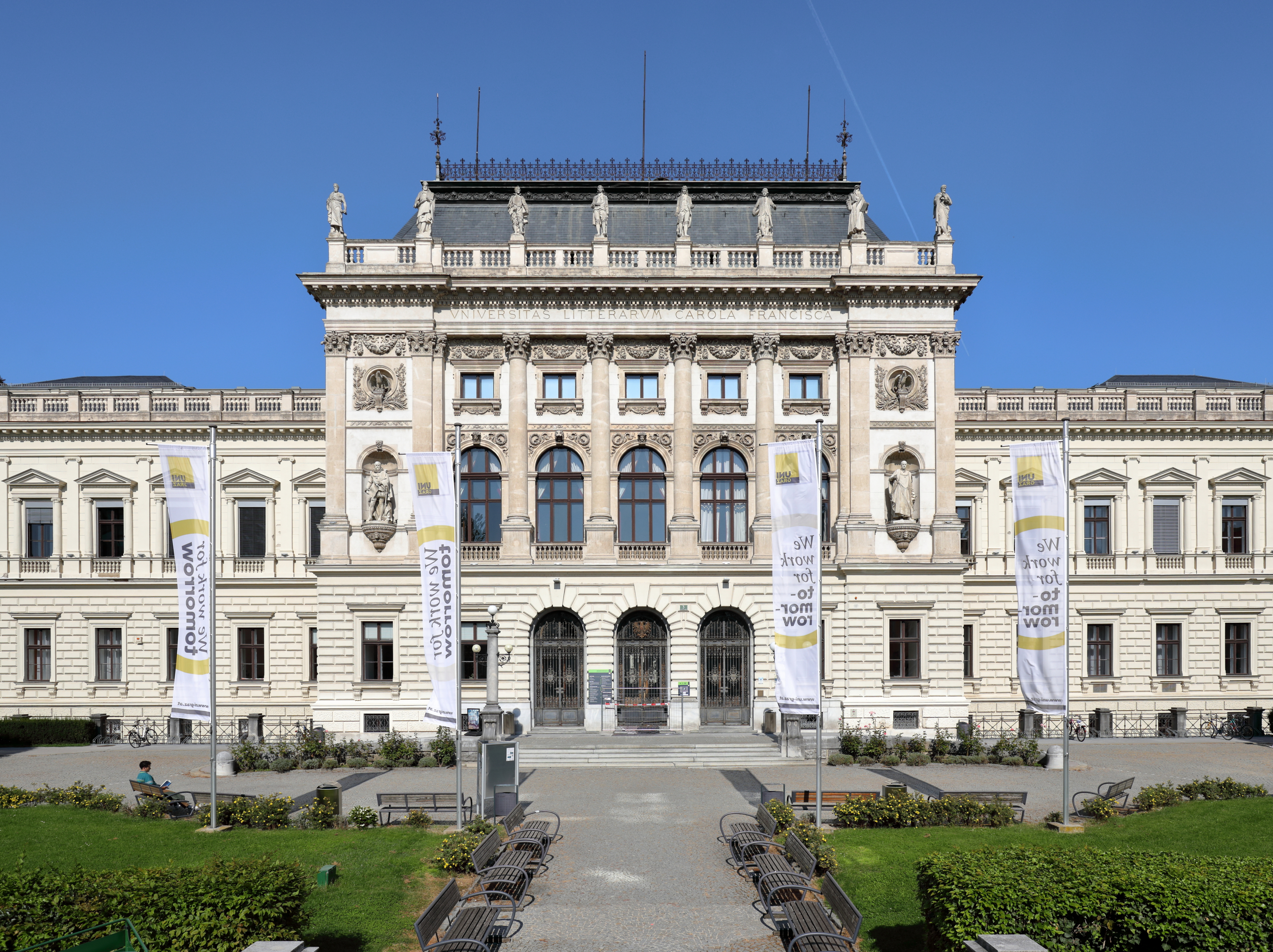
- Main building of the University of Graz.
- Interactive map of Geidorf
- Country: Austria
- state: Styria
- Statutory city: Graz

Area
  - Total: 5.50 km^{2} (2.12 sq mi)

Population (2023)
  - Total: 23,847
  - Density: 4,340/km^{2} (11,200/sq mi)

Geidorf (German: [ɡaɪ̯doʁf, ɡaɪ̯doɐ̯f]) is the 3rd district of the Austrian city of Graz. It is located north of the first two districts I. Innere Stadt and II. St. Leonhard. In the east it stretches as far as the Landeskrankenhaus Universitätsklinikum (state university hospital) and towards the west it borders the river Mur. As the main campus of the University of Graz is located in Geidorf, many students and professors live here.

It had a population of 23,847 in January 2023 and covers an area of 5.5 square kilometres. The postal codes of Geidorf are 8010, 8013, 8015, 8036.

== Sports ==
From 1902 until 2005 the sports club Grazer AK (GAK) had its traditional home ground in the Casino Stadium in Geidorf. However, in 2005 the football section of the club relocated to the new training centre in the city district of XII. Andritz north of Geidorf so that the football stadium was eventually demolished and replaced by housing estates. In contrast, the tennis section of the club is still using the historical grounds in Körösistraße in the west of the district.

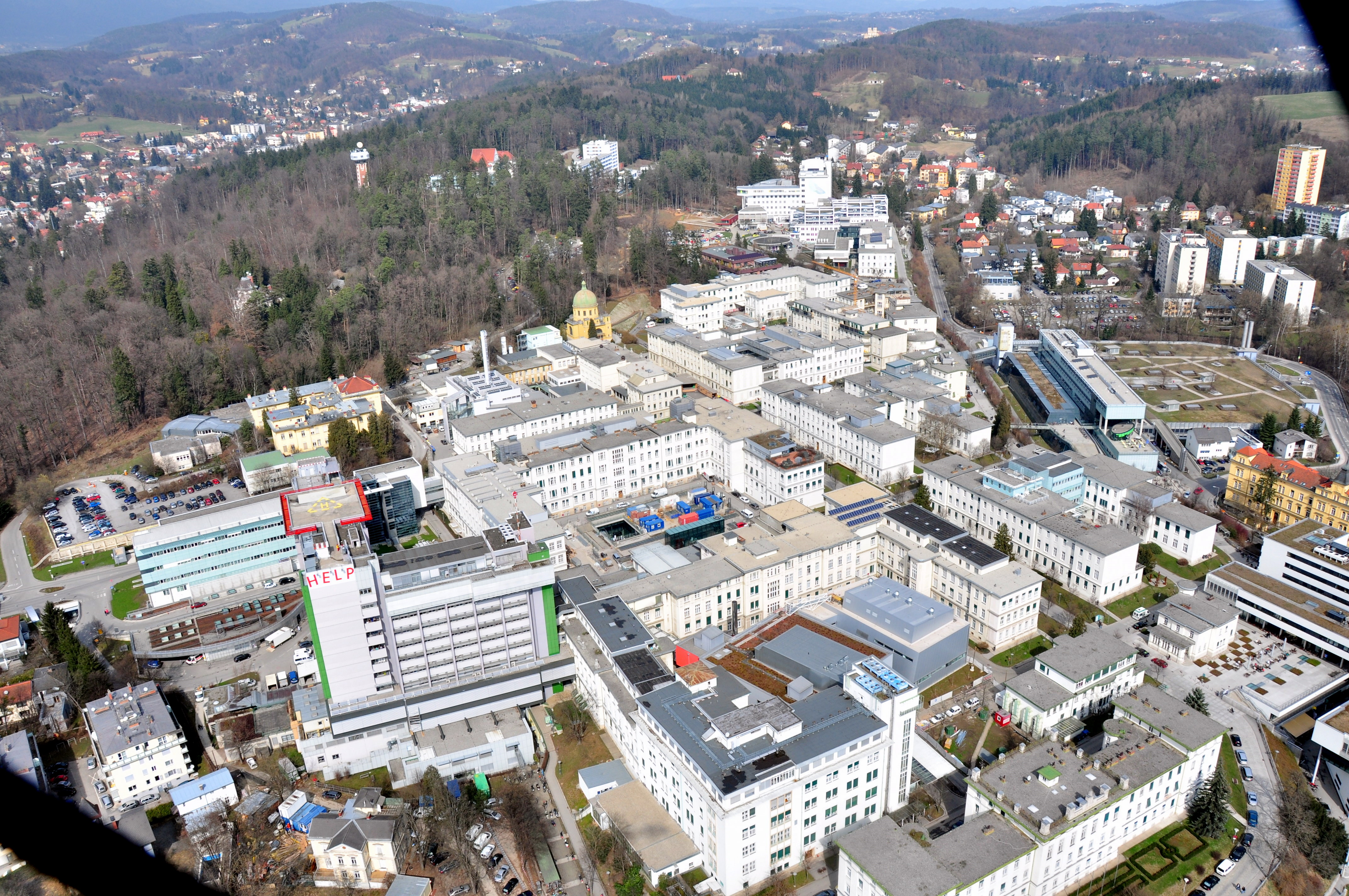
Aeroview of the Universitätsklinikum (university hospital).

== Points of interest ==
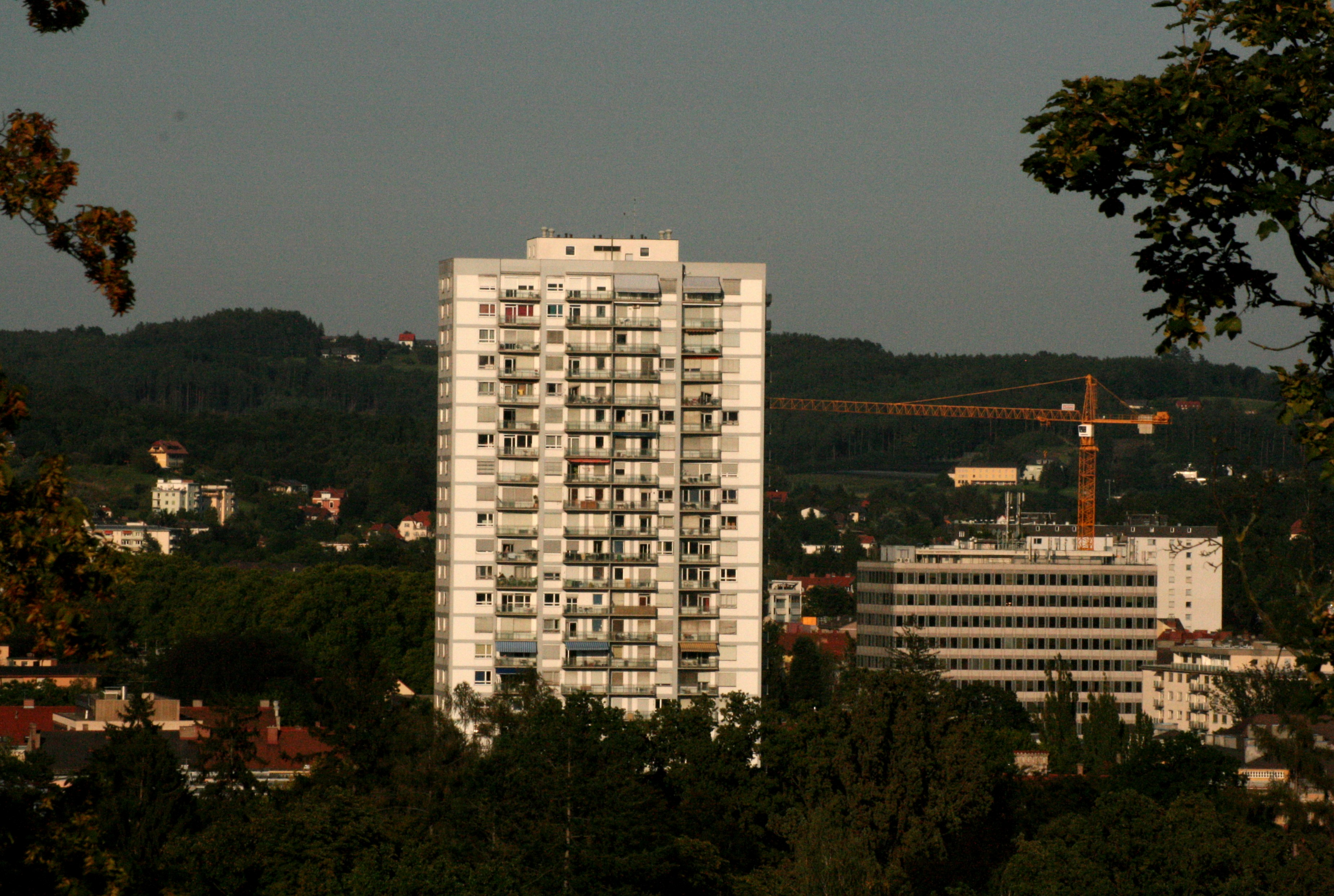
The Elisabeth high riser in Geidorf is the biggest apartment building in Graz.

- University of Graz: The main campus of the university, as well as many other institutes and departments, are located in Geidorf. It is the second largest and second oldest university in all of Austria with a total of nearly 30,000 students.
- Landeskrankenhaus Universitätsklinikum: The ′Uniklinik,′ as it is colloquially called, is a university hospital run in co-operation with the Medical University of Graz and funded mainly by the Styrian state- and Austrian federal government. Occupying a space of more than 148 acres, it is the largest hospital in Europe in terms of surface area.
- Leechkirche: The oldest Roman Catholic church in Graz.
- Meerscheinschlössl: A baroque castle.
