= Franciscan Church, Graz =

Franciscan Church
- Franziskanerkirche
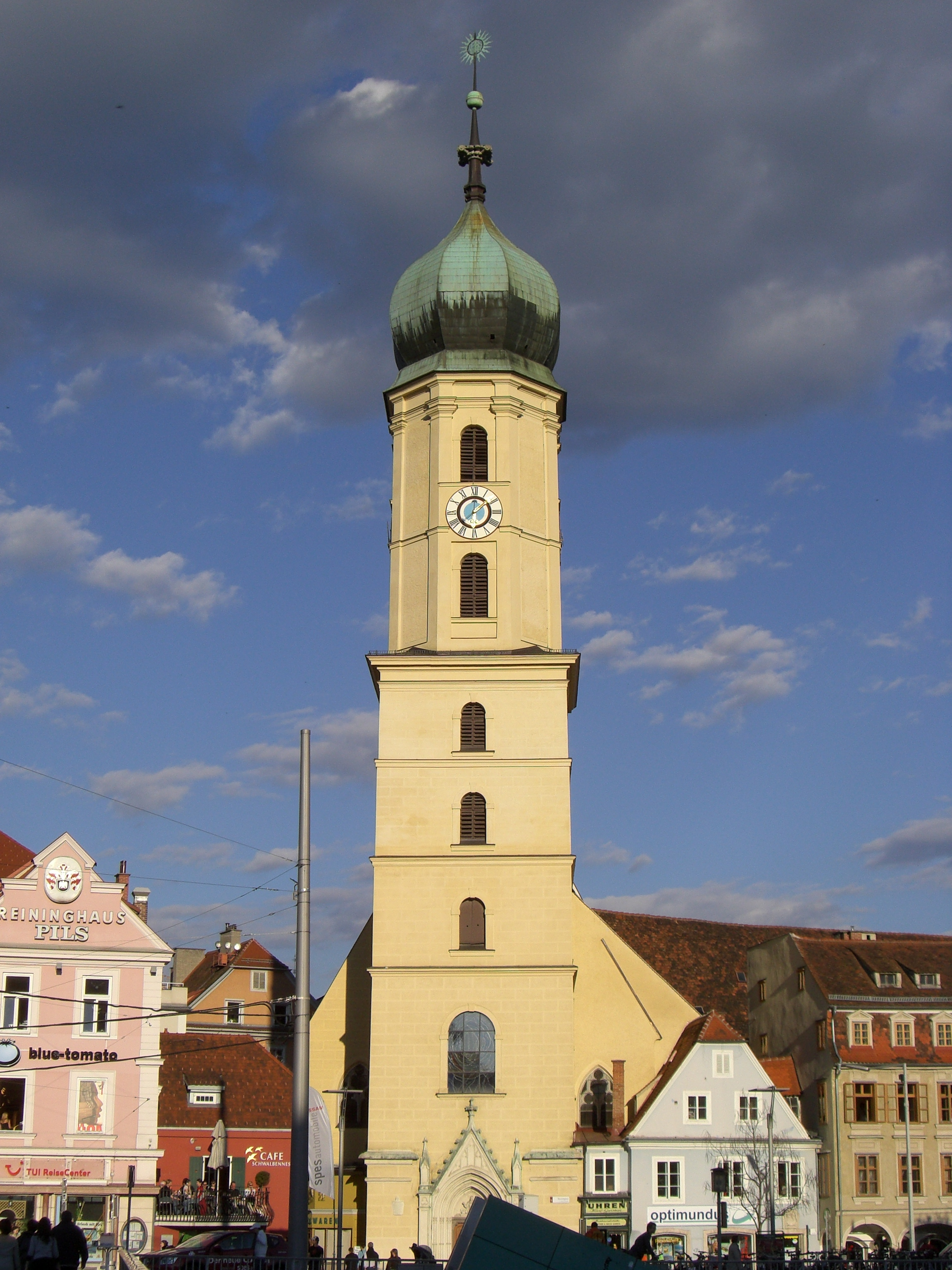
- Franciscan Church
- 47°04′13.74″N 15°26′12.41″E
- Location: Graz, Styria
- Country: Austria
- Denomination: Roman Catholic
- Website: www.franziskaner-graz.at

The Franciscan Church (German: Franziskanerkirche) and Franciscan Monastery (German: Franziskanerkloster) are a church and associated monastery in the centre of the city of Graz, Austria. The monastery was founded by the Franciscan order, who still own it, and is first mentioned in 1239.

In the church, a high but narrow 14th-century chancel contrasts with the comparatively low and wide nave. The chancel was gutted by a bomb in World War II, and subsequently rebuilt with a new contemporary interior. The stained glass windows bathe the church in light, whilst the chancel is dominated by a grey cast iron crucifix that seems to hover. The organ was installed by the Potsdam based Schuke company in 2004.

The original Gothic cloisters of the monastery enclose a monastery garden, and are open to the public. The walls of the cloister are lined with the names, professions and life data of the distinguished burghers and noblemen who were buried in this place between the 15th and the 18th centuries. On the first floor of the monastery, with windows looking into the chancel of the church, is the oratory, where the friars meet for their holy offices.

The high tower, one of the more prominent Graz landmarks, is unusual for a Franciscan establishment. It owes its existence to the church's strategic location next to the city walls, and was built as a fortified tower by the city authorities in the 17th century.
