= Siegfried Nagl =

Austrian politician (born 1963)

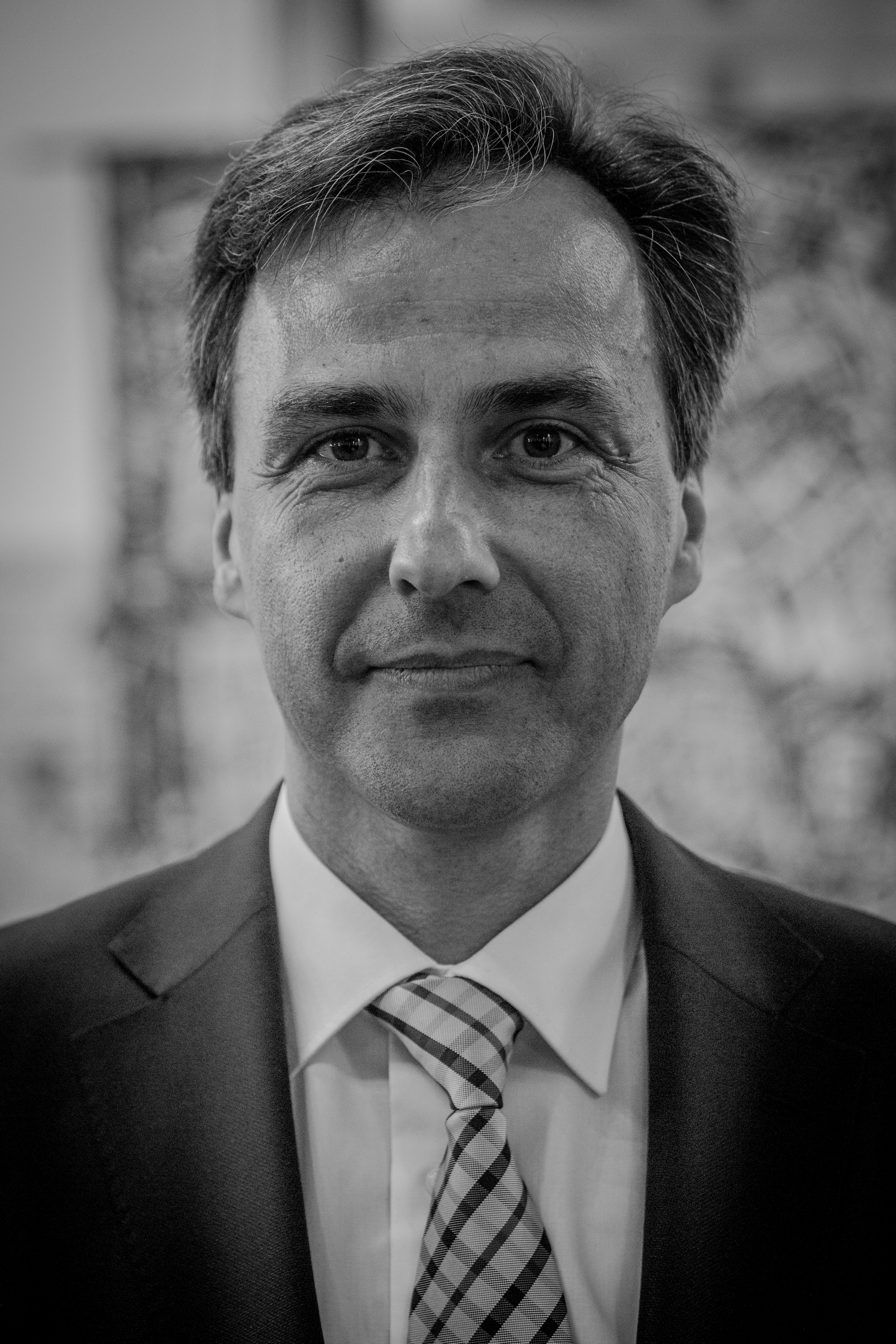
Siegfried Nagl, 2014.

Siegfried Nagl (born 18 April 1963, in Graz) is an Austrian politician with the Austrian People's Party (ÖVP). He was mayor of Graz from 2003 to 2021.

He became mayor after the SPÖ lost the absolute majority and first place in Graz. He was re-elected several times with his city ÖVP. The Graz Social Democrats fell from around 50% at the beginning of the 2000s to around 10% at the beginning of the 2020s.

He was one of the many witnesses to the 2015 Graz car attack that killed three and injured more than 30.

He is Knight of Honor of the Order of St. George.
