= Innere Stadt (Graz) =

Coordinates: 47°4′19″N 15°26′27″E

- 1st city district of Graz
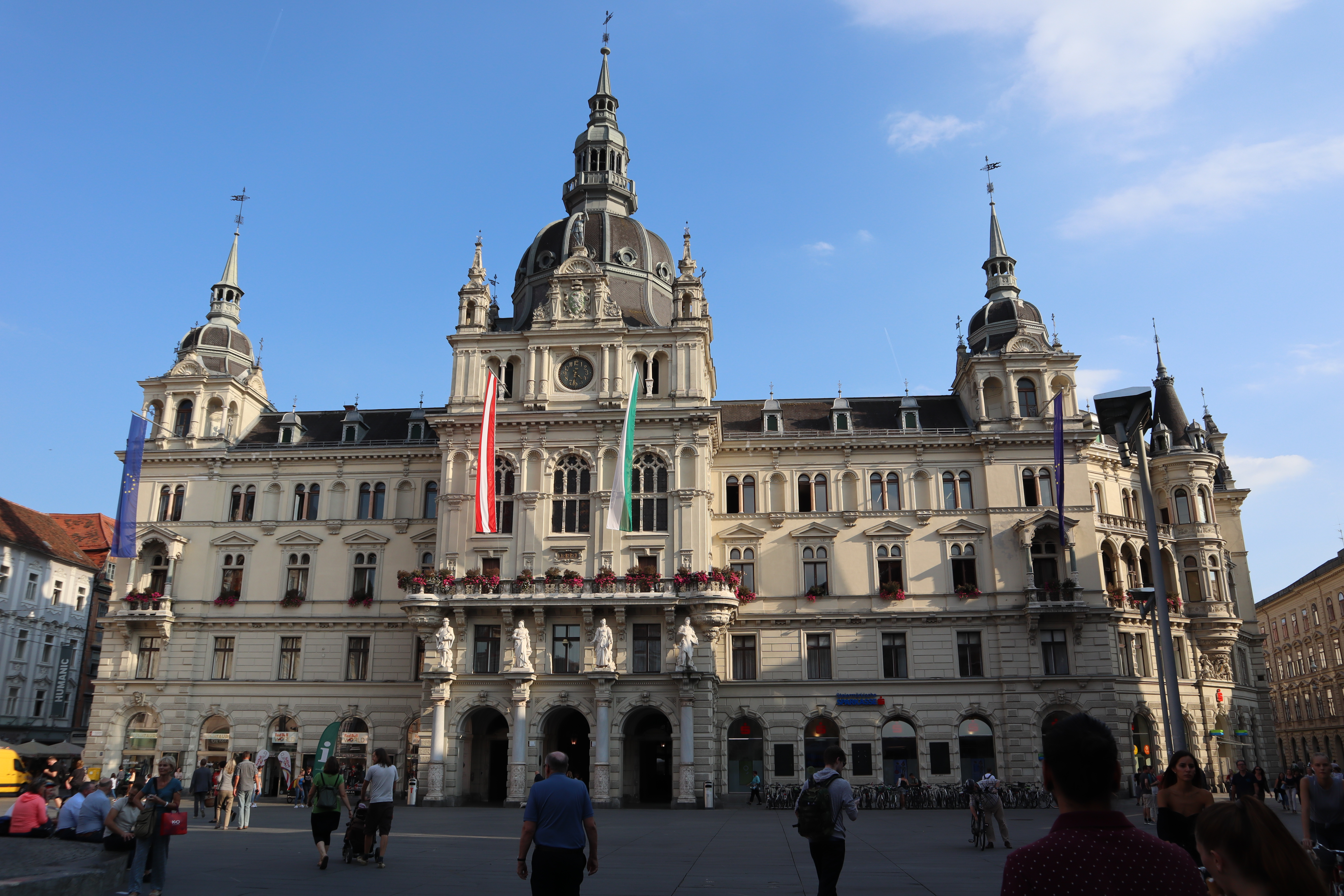
- Interactive map of Innere Stadt
- Country: Austria
- Province: Styria
- Statutory city: Graz

Area
  - Total: 1.16 km^{2} (0.45 sq mi)

Population (2023)
  - Total: 3,314
  - Density: 2,860/km^{2} (7,400/sq mi)
- Postal code: 8010

Innere Stadt (German pronunciation: [ˈɪnəʀə ʃtat]) is the 1st city-district of the Austrian city of Graz, capital of the state of Styria. It is the part of the Old Town (in German: Altstadt) containing the Schloßberg and the city park (Stadtpark). The district borders are formed by the river Mur between Radetzkybrücke and Keplerbrücke, the Wickenburggasse, the Glacis, Jakominiplatz and the Radetzkystraße.

In 1999, the Old Town was declared a UNESCO World Heritage Site.

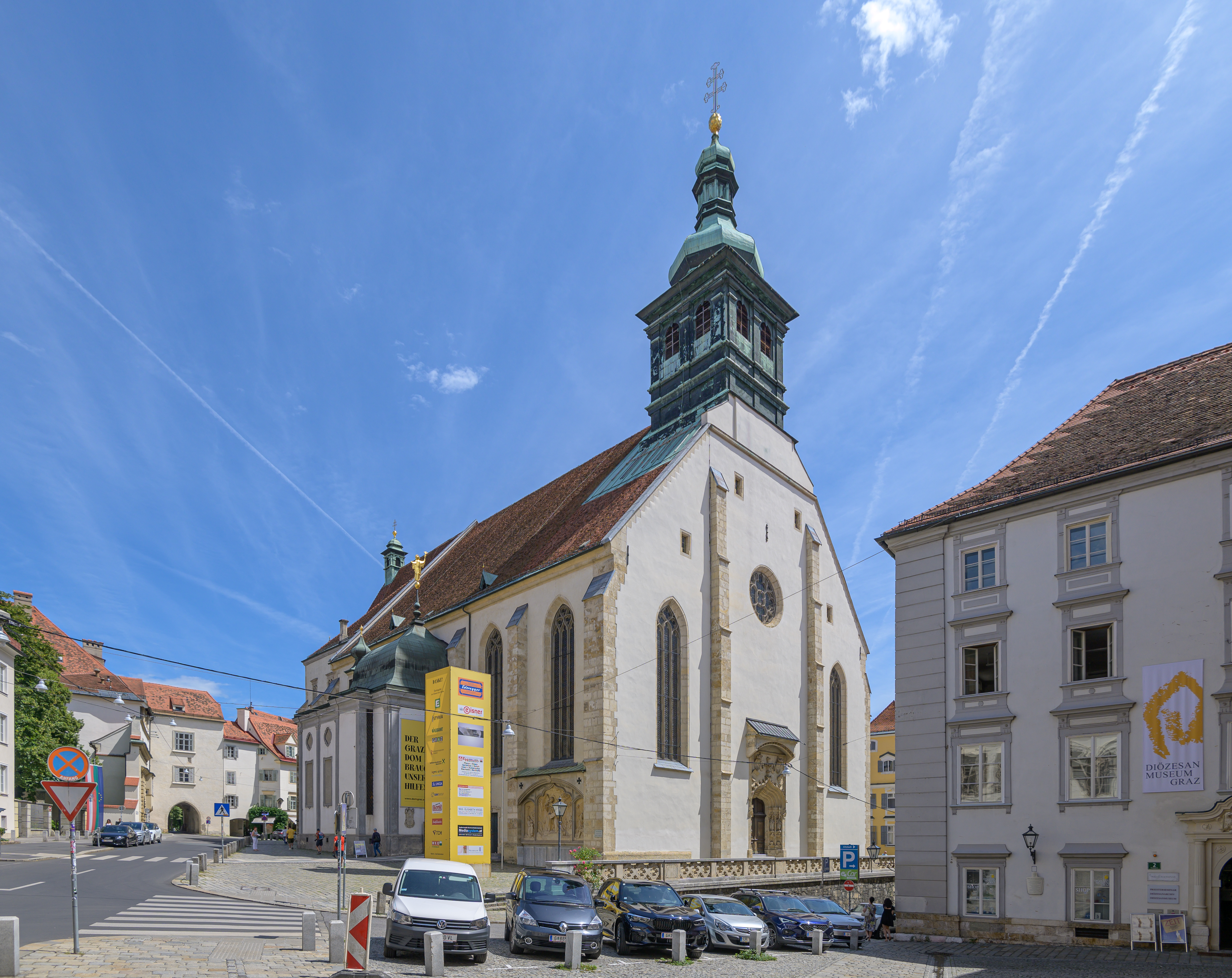
Cathedral of Graz

== History ==
For the most part, the history of the Innere Stadt is the history of Graz.

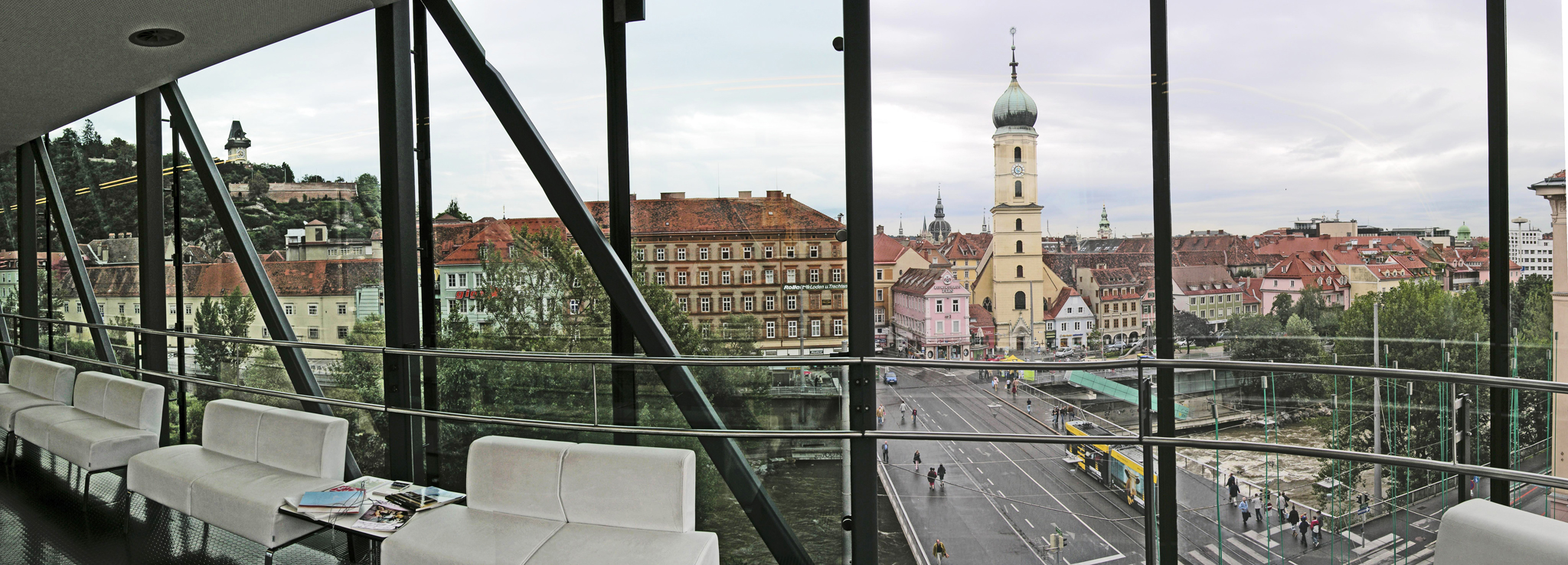
View of world heritage site from the Kunsthaus: the Schloßberg on the left, the Old Town with the Franziskanerkirche on the right.

== Points of interest ==
- Antoniuskirche
- Burg
- Deutschritterordenshaus
- Dom and Mausoleum
- Dreifaltigkeitskirche
- Franziskanerkirche
- Glockenspielplatz
- Hauptplatz
- Herrengasse
- Landhaus
- Landeszeughaus
- Murinsel
- Opernhaus
- Rathaus
- Sackstraße
- Schauspielhaus
- Schloßberg
- Sporgasse
- Stadtpark
- Stadtpfarrkirche
- Universalmuseum Joanneum
