= Liebenau (Graz) =

Coordinates: 47°02′26″N 15°27′04″E

- 7th city district of Graz
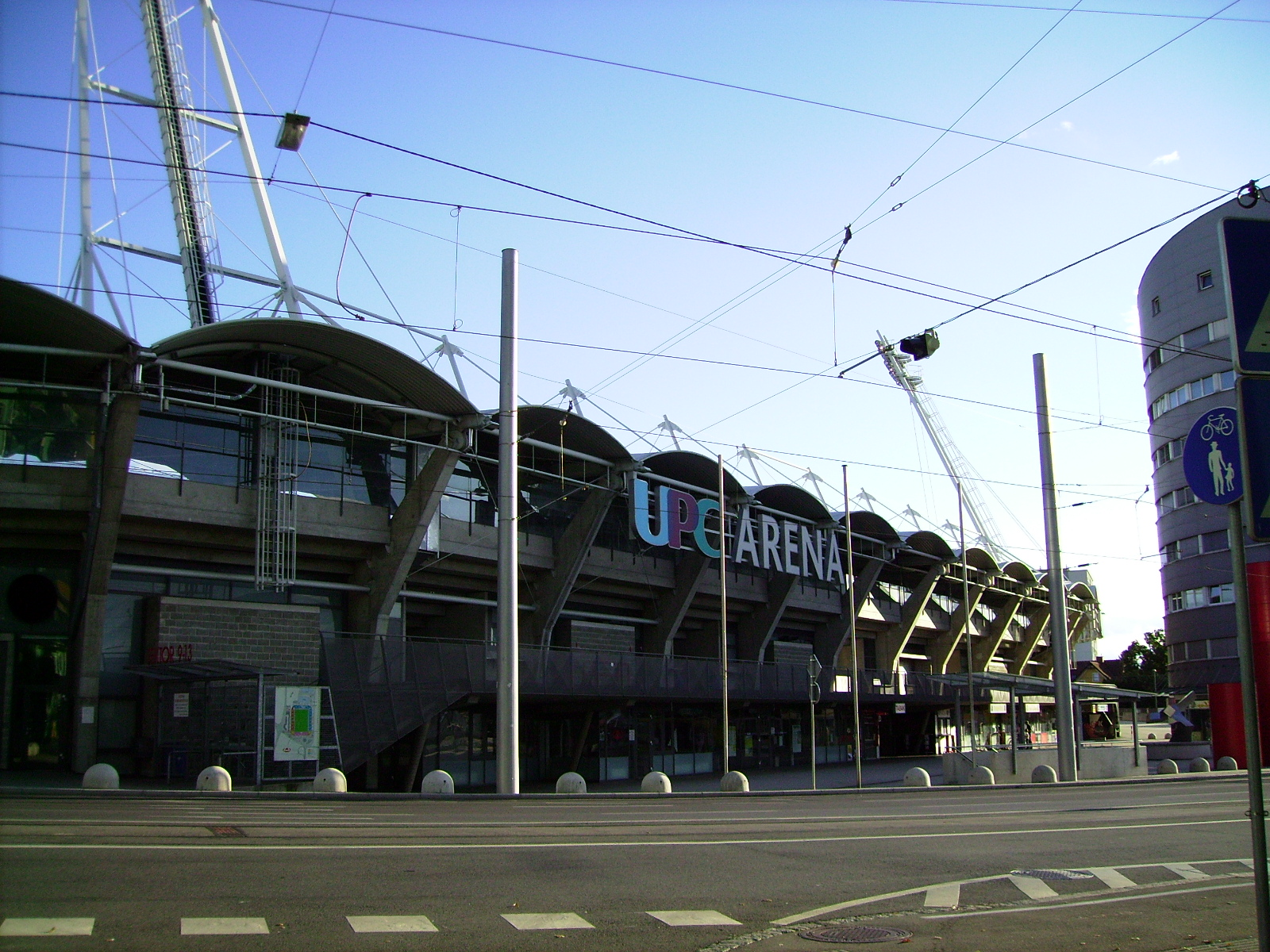
- Merkur Arena Graz
- Interactive map of Liebenau
- Country: Austria
- Province: Styria
- Statutory city: Graz

Area
  - Total: 7.99 km^{2} (3.08 sq mi)

Population (2023)
  - Total: 15,896
  - Density: 1,990/km^{2} (5,150/sq mi)

Liebenau (German: [ˈliːbεnaʊ̯]) is the 7th District of the Austrian city of Graz. The district is located in the southeastern part of the city. It is bordered to the north by the 6th District, Jakomini, and on the east by the 8th district, St. Peter. In Liebenau, farms still exist alongside the shopping centres and largescale industrial holdings, including the Magna Steyr car plant.

== Geography ==
=== Area ===
7.99 km^{2}

=== Population ===
15,896 (01.01. 2023)

=== Postal Code ===
8041 8042 8074
