= St. Peter (Graz) =

- 8th city district of Graz
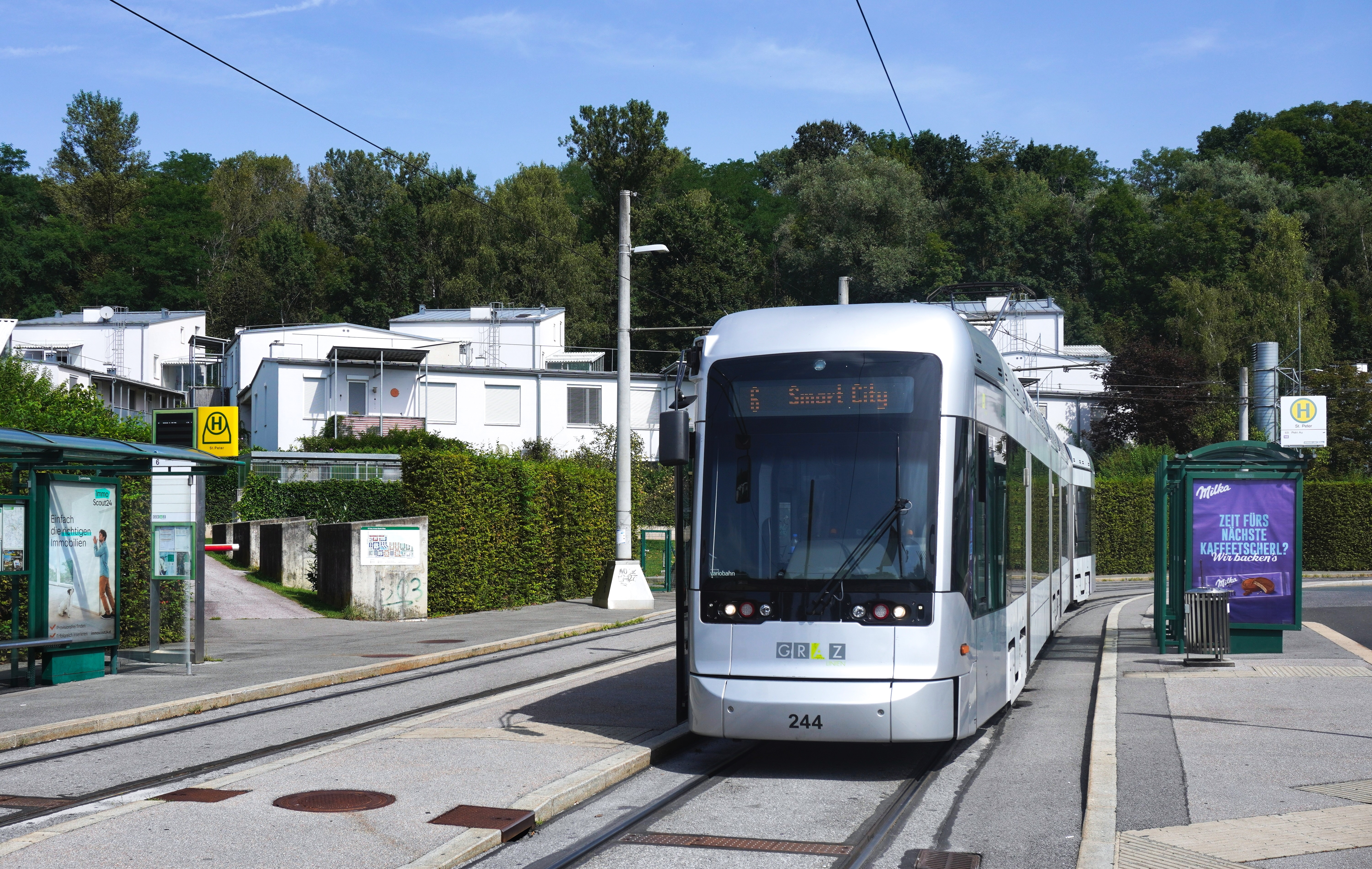
- Tram stop St.Peter
- Interactive map of St. Peter
- Coordinates: 47°03′18″N 15°28′30″E
- Country: Austria
- Province: Styria
- Statutory city: Graz

Area
  - Total: 8.86 km^{2} (3.42 sq mi)

Population (2024)
  - Total: 16,606
  - Density: 1,870/km^{2} (4,850/sq mi)
- Postal code: 8010, 8041, 8042, 8051

St. Peter (German: [saŋkt ˈpeːtɐ]) is the 8th District of Graz, in Styria, Austria. Its area is 8.86 km^{2}. As of January 2024, its population was 16,606. It was formed in 1938 from the villages of Messendorf, Neufeld, Peterstal and Petersbergen.
