= Gries (Graz) =

- 5th city district of Graz
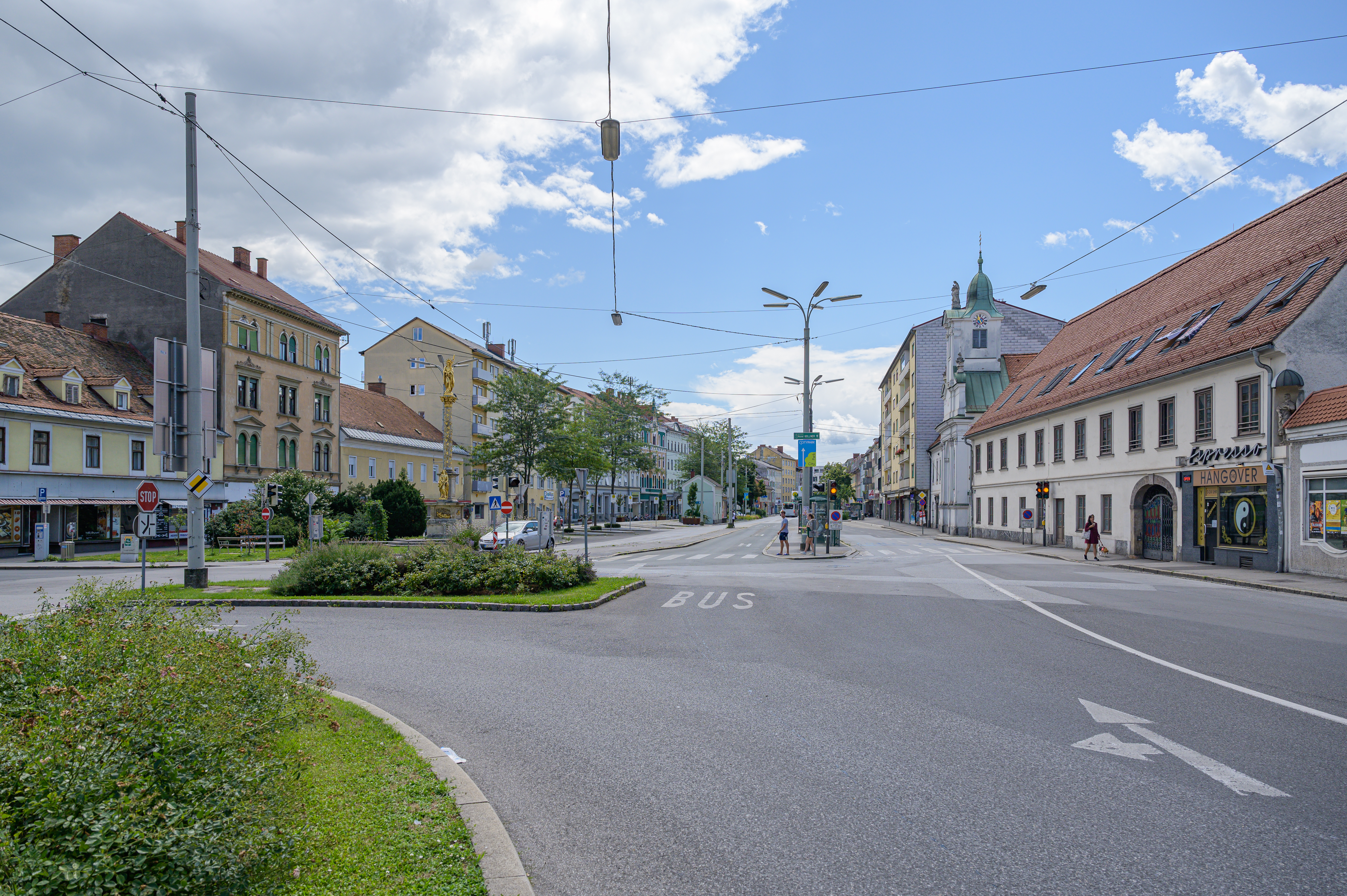
- Griesplatz in 2023

- Location within Styria Location within Austria
- Coordinates: 47°3′48″N 15°25′43″E
- Country: Austria
- State: Styria
- City: Graz

Area
  - Total: 5.05 km^{2} (1.95 sq mi)

Population (2023)
  - Total: 30,050
  - Density: 5,950/km^{2} (15,400/sq mi)
- Postal code: 8020 8053 8055

Gries (Austrian German pronunciation: [ɡʁiːs]) is the 5th District of the Austrian city of Graz. It is the location of Graz's red-light district.
