= Statutory city (Austria) =

Administrative division type

Statutory cities in Austria

In Austrian politics, a statutory city (German: Stadt mit eigenem Statut or Statutarstadt [ʃtatuˈtaːɐ̯ˌʃtat]), also known in Burgenland as free city (German: Freistadt), is a city that is vested, in addition to its purview as a municipality, with the powers and duties of a district administrative authority. The city administration thus functions as both a municipal government and a branch of the executive arm of the national government. A resident of a statutory city would, for example, contact a city office and interact with city employees to apply for a driver's license or a passport.

As of 2022, there are 15 statutory cities. Statutory cities are mostly major regional population centers with residents numbering in the tens of thousands. The median statutory city has a population of about sixty thousand.

== Legal framework ==
A statutory city is a city vested with both municipal and district administrative responsibility. A district that is a statutory city does not have a dedicated district administrative authority. Instead, town hall personnel also serves as district personnel; the mayor also discharges the powers and duties of a head of district commission. City management thus functions both as a regional government and a branch of the national government at the same time.

The constitution stipulates that a community with at least 20,000 residents can demand to be elevated to statutory city status by its respective province, unless the province can demonstrate this would jeopardize regional interests, or unless the national government objects. The last community to have invoked this right is Wels, a statutory city since 1964. As of 2014, ten other communities are eligible but not interested.

== Vienna ==
The statutory city of Vienna, a community with well over 1.9 million residents, is divided into 23 municipal districts (Gemeindebezirke). Despite the similar name and the comparable role they fill, municipal districts have a different legal basis than the kind of district that Vienna as a whole is. The statutory cities of Graz and Klagenfurt also have subdivisions referred to as "municipal districts", but these are merely neighborhood-size divisions of the city administration.

== History ==
From the Middle Ages until the mid-eighteenth century, the Austrian Empire was an absolute monarchy with no written constitution and no modern concept of the rule of law. Regional administration had no overarching legal framework; customs were different from province to province. A first step towards a systematic footing was taking by Empress Maria Theresa, who in 1753 partitioned the country into districts (Kreise) ruled by district offices (Kreisämter) staffed by professional administrators and operating under empire-wide consistent rules. The scheme was unpopular at first and met with resistance. Most notably, it was never fully implemented in the Kingdom of Hungary.

Following the first wave of the revolutions of 1848, Emperor Ferdinand I enacted Austria's first formal constitution. The constitution abolished the estates and called for a separation of executive and judicial authority, crippling most existing regional institutions and leaving district offices as the backbone of the empire's administration.

An 1849 Imperial Resolution consolidated and reaffirmed and revised the system. The law was implemented in 1850, many districts now already in their present-day borders. Small to medium towns and villages were arranged into districts of ten to thirty municipalities each. Larger cities were made districts of their own; these cities would from now on be referred to as statutory cities. The first statutory cities in regions that are still part of Austria today were Vienna, Graz, Innsbruck, and Klagenfurt.

Between 1848 and 1867 the empire, its constitution, and its civil administration framework underwent a series of upheavals culminating in the Austro-Hungarian Compromise of 1867. Ferdinand was forced to abdicate; his successor Franz Joseph I scrapped the district system in 1851 but was forced to assent to its restoration in 1868.

By 1869, Linz, Wiener Neustadt, Steyr, and Salzburg had gained statutory city status.

The Republic of Austria established after the 1918 collapse of the monarchy retained the district system.

The 1867 Compromise had meant the partition of the empire; Cisleithania and the Kingdom of Hungary were now two separate countries with separate types of administrative subdivisions. There would be no more attempts to impose the district system on Hungary and consequently no more attempts to create Hungarian statutory cities. Hungary retained an older system, in which major municipalities could be elevated to royal free city status. When Hungary ceded Burgenland to Austria in 1921, the region included two of these royal free cities, Eisenstadt and Rust. The distinction went back to 1648 in the case of Eisenstadt and back to 1681 in the case of Rust. Honoring their archaic privileges even though they had lost their significance as population centers, Austria transformed the two towns into statutory cities.

Between 1922 and 1964, the status was given to four additional communes.

== List of current statutory cities ==
The code column identifies each city's district code (Bezirkskennzahl), Est. means the year of becoming the status of statutory city.

Code	Name	Est.	License plate	Population 2022
101	Eisenstadt	1921	E	15,240
102	Rust	1921	E (Note: Rust shares Eisenstadt's E code.)	1,984
201	Klagenfurt am Wörthersee	1850	K	102,618
202	Villach	1932	VI	64,071
301	Krems an der Donau	1938	KS	24,921
302	Sankt Pölten	1922	P	56,360
303	Waidhofen an der Ybbs	1868	WY	11,092
304	Wiener Neustadt	1866	WN	47,106
401	Linz	1866	L	207,247
402	Steyr	1867	SR	37,879
403	Wels	1964	WE	63,181
501	Salzburg	1869	S	155,416
601	Graz	1850	G	292,630
701	Innsbruck	1850	I	130,585
901	Wien	1850	W	1,931,593

== See also ==
- Stadtrat
