= 2026 Graz local election =

Election in Graz, Austria

- 28 June 2026

All 48 seats in the Gemeinderat of Graz 25 seats needed for a majority
- Turnout: 117,204 (54.2%) ▲0.2%
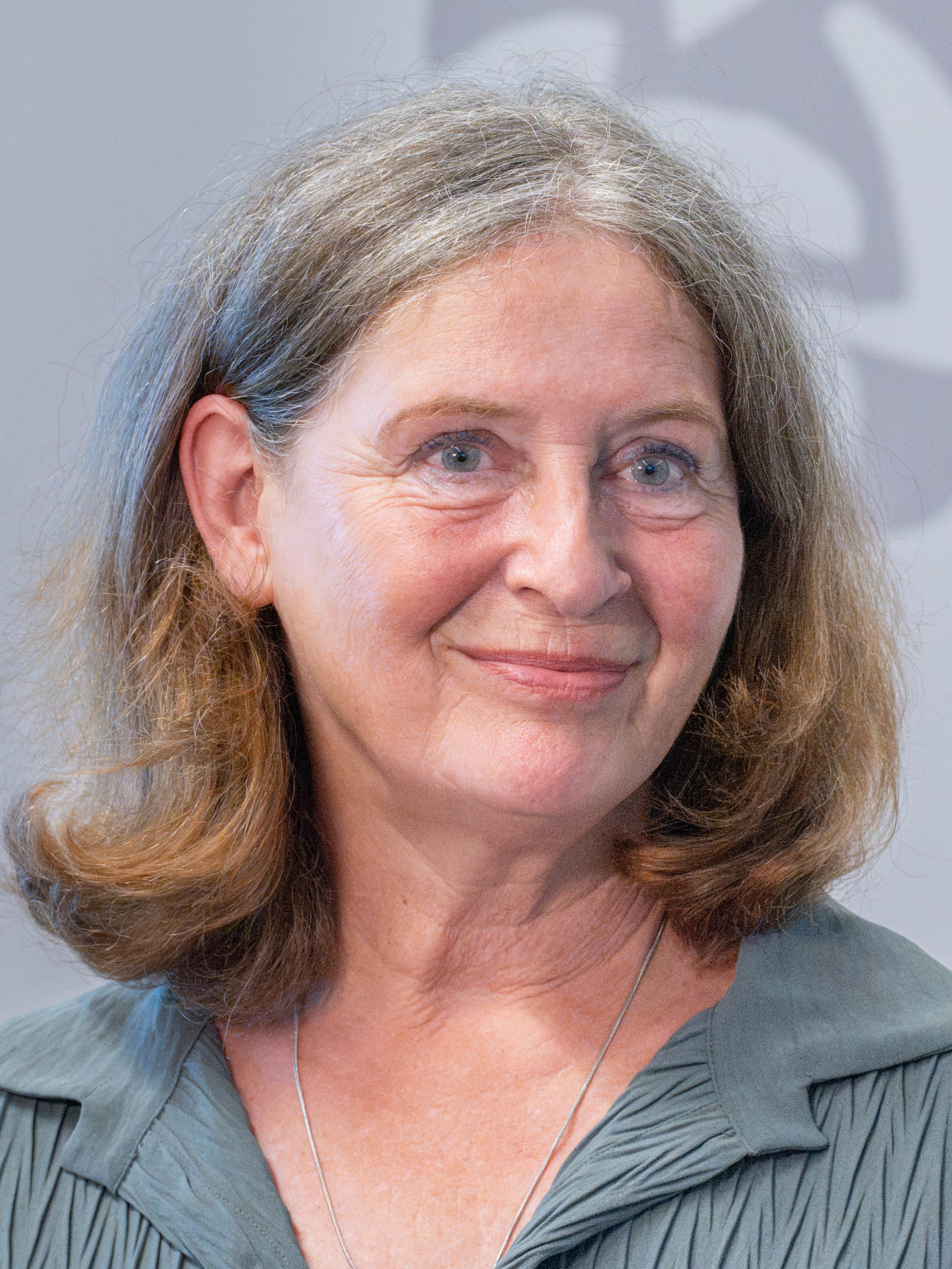

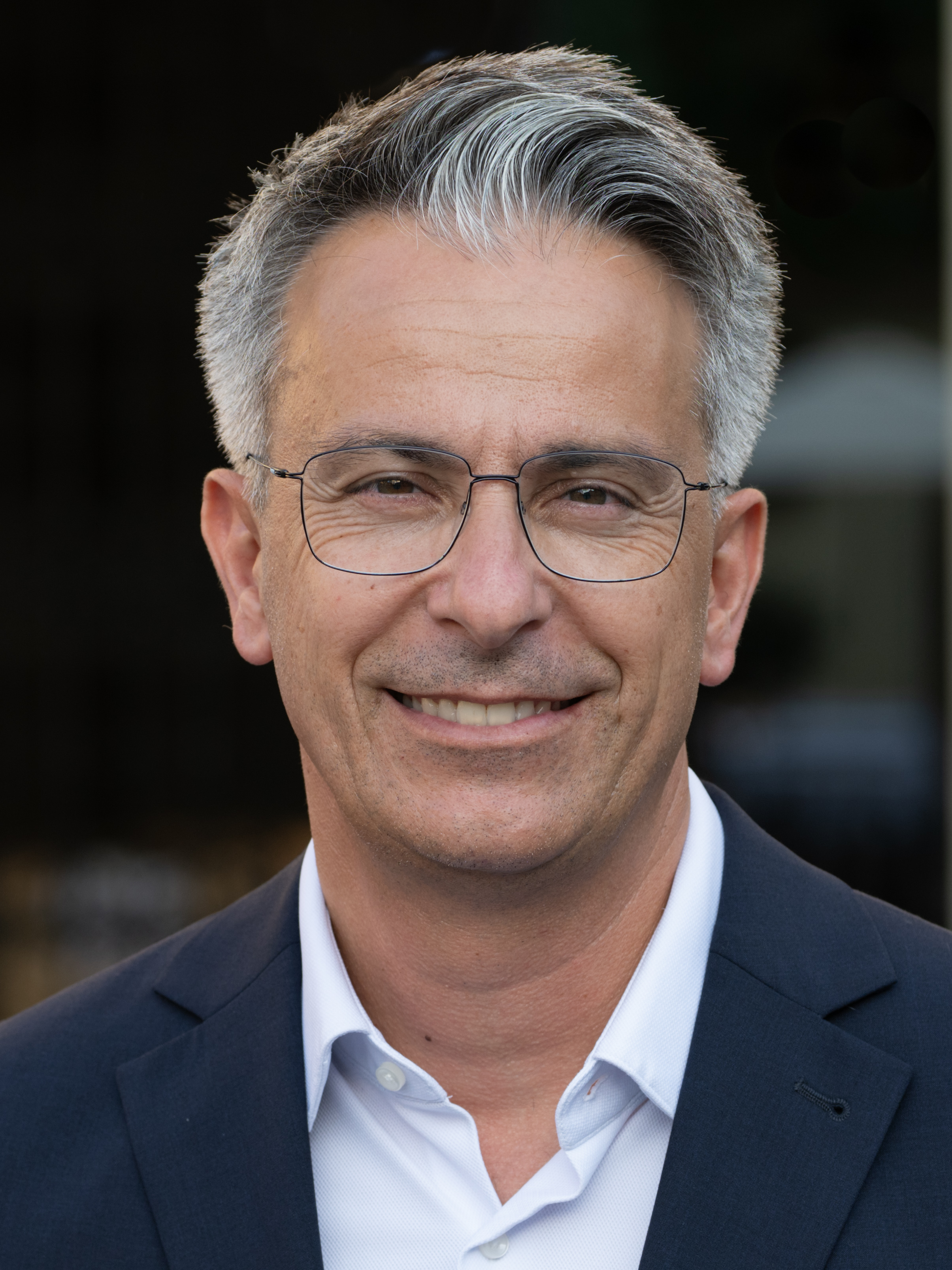

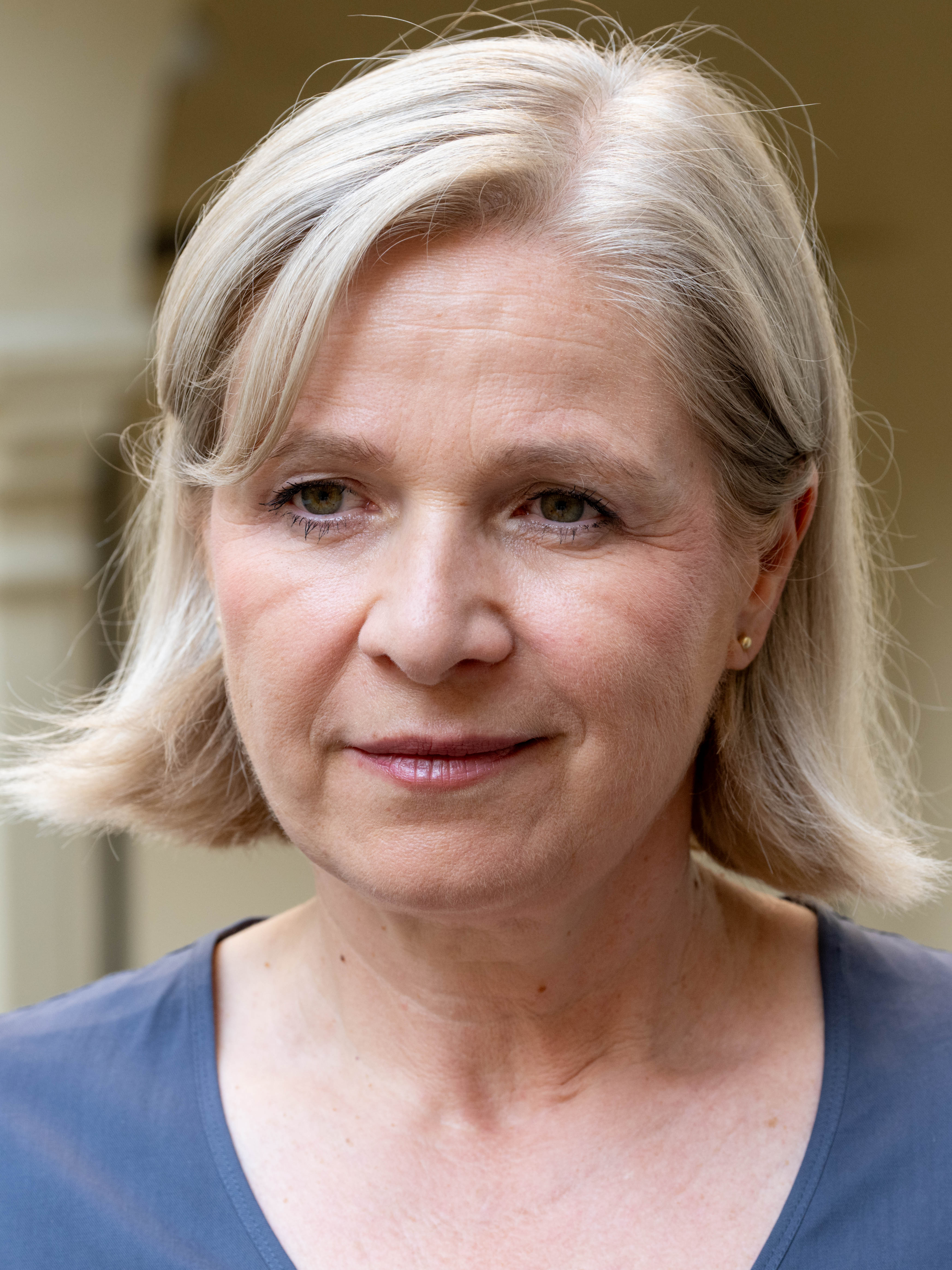

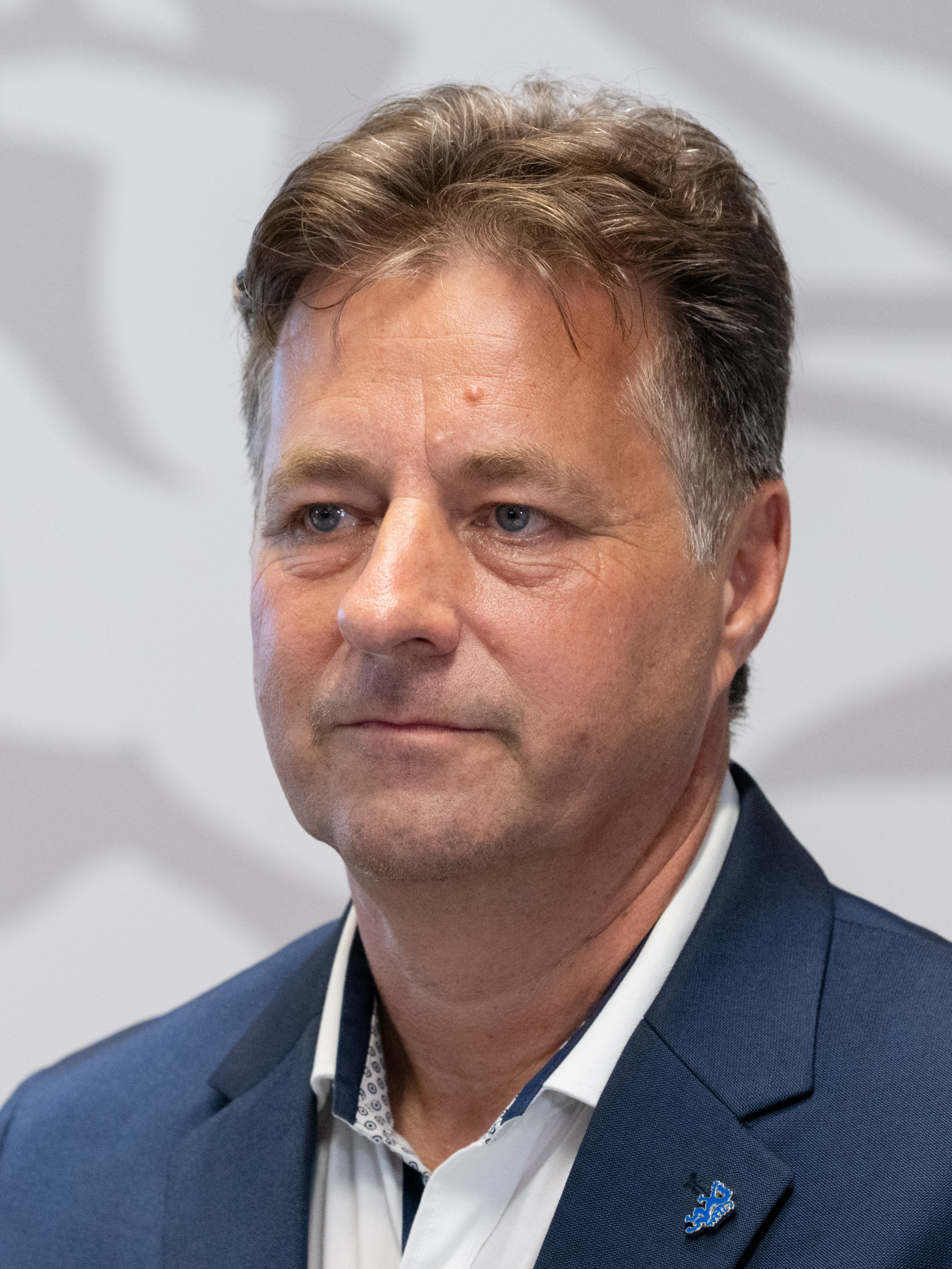

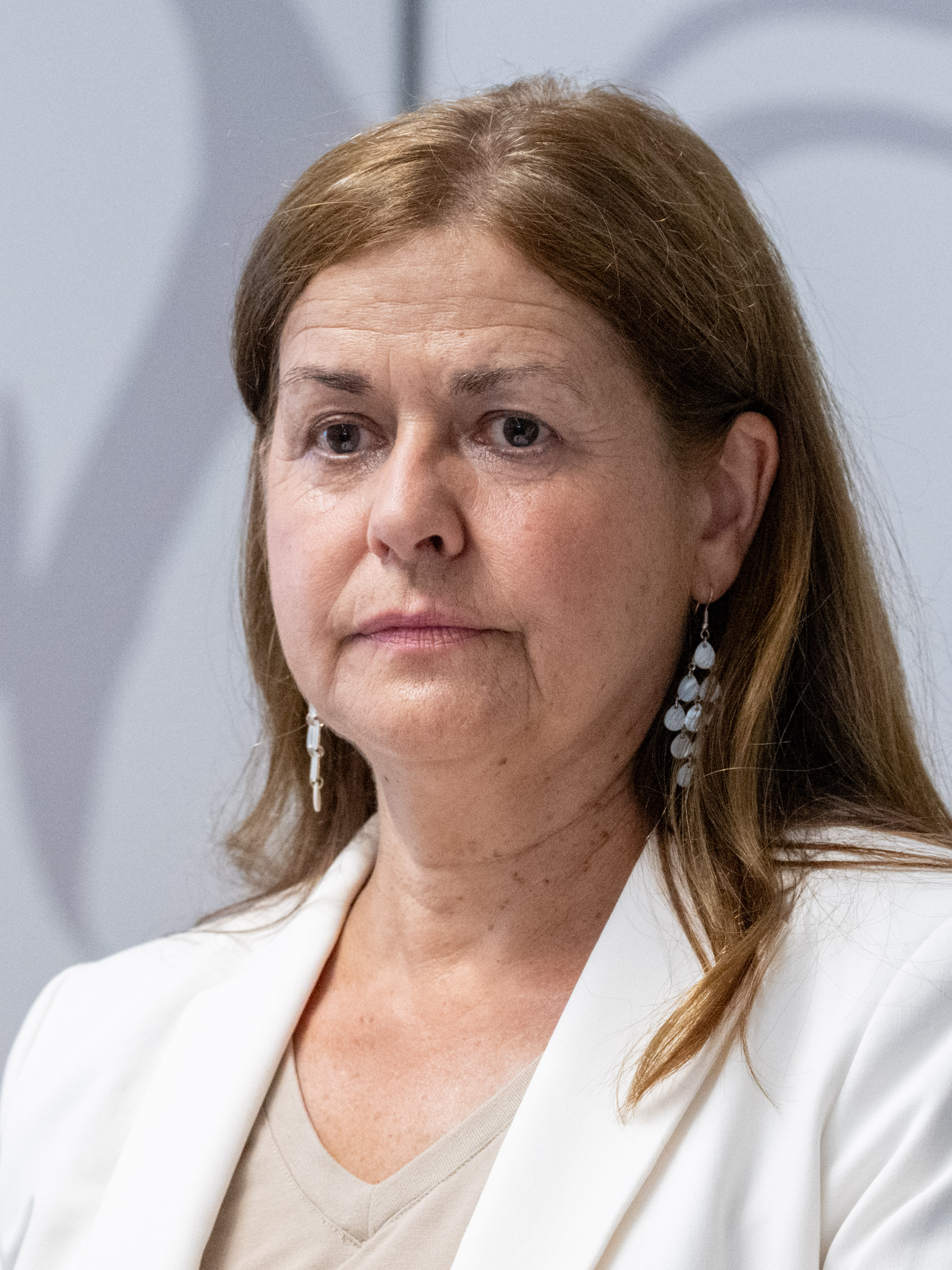

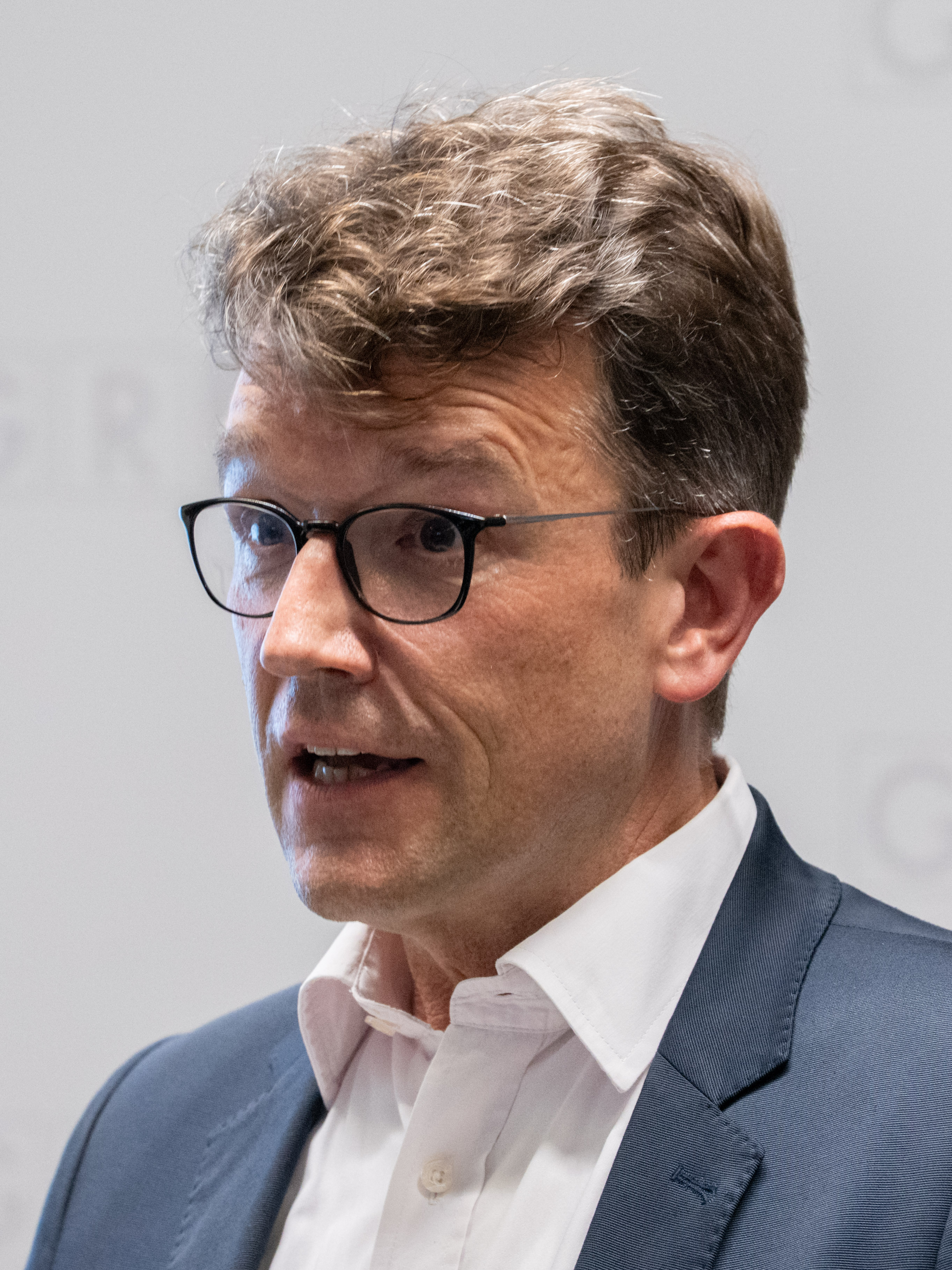
	First party	Second party	Third party
Leader	Elke Kahr	Kurt Hohensinner	Judith Schwentner
Party	KPÖ	ÖVP	Greens
Last election	15 seats, 28.8%	13 seats, 25.9%	9 seats, 17.3%
Seats won	18	13	7
Seat change	▲3	Steady	▼2
Popular vote	43,145	30,554	18,066
Percentage	35.7%	25.3%	14.9%
Swing	▲6.9%	▼0.6%	▼2.4%
	Fourth party	Fifth party	Sixth party
Leader	Rene Apfelknab	Doris Kampus	Philipp Pointner
Party	FPÖ	SPÖ	NEOS
Last election	5 seats, 10.6%	4 seats, 9.5%	2 seats, 5.4%
Seats won	6	2	2
Seat change	▲1	▼2	Steady
Popular vote	14,509	6,802	5,951
Percentage	12.0%	5.6%	4.9%
Swing	▲1.4%	▼3.9%	▼0.5%
- Winning party by municipal district.
Mayor before election
Elke Kahr
KPÖ
Elected mayor
TBD

The 2026 Graz local election was held on 28 June 2026 to elect the members of the Gemeinderat of Graz.

== Background ==
In the 2021 Graz local election, the Communist Party of Austria (KPÖ) became the largest party for the first time in the city's history, winning almost 29% of votes cast. The previous governing party, the Austrian People's Party (ÖVP), fell from 38% to second place with 26%. The Freedom Party of Austria (FPÖ) also suffered losses and finished in fourth place on 11%, while The Greens moved into third with 17%. The Social Democratic Party of Austria (SPÖ) recorded a slight decline to 9.5%. NEOS – The New Austria won 5.4% and gained a second seat. The KPÖ subsequently formed a coalition with the Greens and SPÖ, and Elke Kahr was elected mayor by the Gemeinderat on 17 November with 28 out of 46 votes. She became the first female mayor of Graz and the first communist mayor of an Austrian city.

== Electoral system ==
In Graz, the 48 seats of the Gemeinderat are elected by open list under proportional representation with no electoral threshold. The mayor (Bürgermeister) is elected by the Gemeinderat from among its members using a majority vote. The municipal executive (Stadtsenat) consists of the mayor and seven city councillors (Stadträte). Statute requires these seven positions are allocated proportionally among parties according to their share of the vote (Proporz), resulting in a permanent multi-party executive. Though coalitions thus have no impact on the makeup of government, parties still form them for the purpose of securing legislative majorities.

The outgoing executive consisted of 3 KPÖ seats, 2 ÖVP seats, one Green seat, and one for the Korruptionsfreier Gemeinderatsklub – "Corruption-Free Municipal Council Club", a group of defectors who left the FPÖ over a financial scandal. That group stood in this election under the name "Citizens' List for a Corruption-Free Graz" (Bürgerliste Korruptionsfreies Graz).

== Contesting parties ==
No.	Name		Leader	2021 result		
No.	Name		Leader	Votes (%)	Seats	Councillors
1	FPÖ	Freedom Party of Austria; Freiheitliche Partei Österreichs	Rene Apfelknab	10.6%	5 / 48	1 / 7
2	ÖVP	Team Kurt Hohensinner – Graz People's Party; Team Kurt Hohensinner – Grazer Volkspartei	Kurt Hohensinner	25.9%	13 / 48	2 / 7
3	SPÖ	SPÖ Graz – Doris Kampus; SPÖ Graz – Doris Kampus	Doris Kampus	9.5%	4 / 48	0 / 7
4	GRÜNE	The Graz Greens – Judith Schwentner; Die Grazer Grünen – Judith Schwentner	Judith Schwentner	17.3%	9 / 48	1 / 7
5	NEOS	NEOS – The reform force for Graz; NEOS – Die Reformkraft für Graz	Philipp Pointner	5.4%	2 / 48	0 / 7
6	KPÖ	Elke Kahr – Communist Party of Austria; Elke Kahr – Kommunistische Partei Österreichs	Elke Kahr	28.8%	15 / 48	3 / 7
7	DBÖ	Democratic Alliance of Austria; Demokratisches Bündnis Österreich		did not contest		
8	KFG	Citizens' List for a Corruption-Free Graz; Bürgerliste Korruptionsfreies Graz	Claudia Schönbacher	did not contest		
9	GAZA	GAZA List – Voices for Global Justice; Liste GAZA – Stimmen für globale Gerechtigkeit		did not contest		
10	PIRAT	Pirate Party Graz – Young, progressive, better for Graz! Piratenpartei Graz – Jung, progressiv, besser für Graz!		0.4%	0 / 48	0 / 7
11	MFG	MFG Austria – People Freedom Fundamental Rights; MFG – Österreich Menschen – Freiheit – Grundrecht		did not contest		

== Opinion polling ==
Outlet	Date	ÖVP	KPÖ	FPÖ	Grüne	SPÖ	NEOS	Others	Lead
2026 local election	28 June 2026	25.3	35.7	12.0	15.0	5.6	4.9	1.5	10.4
Peter Hajek	6 Jun 2026	22	32	15	12	9	9	1	10
M&R	10 May 2026	24	27	14.5	17	7.5	7.5	3	3
Peter Hajek	14 Mar 2026	20	31	18	14	8	8	1	11
Triple M	19 Feb 2026	23	28	16	15	9	8	1	5
2021 local election	26 Sep 2021	25.9	28.8	10.6	17.3	9.5	5.4	2.4	2.9

== Results and aftermath ==
The KPÖ made further gains, winning in a landslide with almost 36% of the vote. Following the SPÖ's record-low result, local party leader Doris Kampus resigned to take responsibility for the loss.

The FPÖ regained the Stadtsenat seat it lost to defectors, and the other parties' allocations remained unchanged. The ÖVP approached the KPÖ about starting coalition negotiations; the KPÖ declined the offer and instead came to an agreement to continue working with the Greens. The two parties have a bare majority of 25 seats. The SPÖ did not rejoin the coalition and instead positioned itself as a constructive opposition.

Party	Votes	%	+/−	Seats	+/−	Coun.	+/−
Communist Party of Austria (KPÖ)	43,145	35.7	▲6.9	18	▲3	3	0
Austrian People's Party (ÖVP)	30,554	25.3	▼0.6	13	0	2	0
The Greens – The Green Alternative (GRÜNE)	18,066	14.9	▼2.4	7	▼2	1	0
Freedom Party of Austria (FPÖ)	14,509	12.0	▲1.4	6	▲1	1	0
Social Democratic Party of Austria (SPÖ)	6,802	5.6	▼3.9	2	▼2	0	0
NEOS – The New Austria and Liberal Forum (NEOS)	5,951	4.9	▼0.5	2	0	0	0
Citizens' List for a Corruption-Free Graz	822	0.7	New	—			
MFG Austria – People Freedom Fundamental Rights	334	0.3	New	—			
Pirate Party of Austria	307	0.3	▼0.1	—			
Gaza List	247	0.2	New	—			
Democratic Alliance of Austria	130	0.1	New	—			
Invalid/blank votes	1,493	1.2	▼0.3	—			
Total	122,360	100.0	—	48	—	7	—
Registered voters/turnout	225,883	54.2	▲0.2	—			
Source: Stadt Graz

=== Results by district ===
District	KPÖ	ÖVP	Grüne	FPÖ	SPÖ	NEOS
I. Innere Stadt	40.8	25.8	15.3	8.3	3.7	5.0
II. St. Leonhard	40.2	22.2	20.6	6.5	3.8	5.3
III. Geidorf	37.9	24.6	18.7	7.4	4.2	5.9
IV. Lend	43.2	16.9	15.3	12.6	6.8	3.3
V. Gries	49.0	14.5	12.7	12.9	5.4	2.3
VI. Jakomini	45.3	19.2	14.8	10.1	4.9	4.3
VII. Liebenau	30.7	28.1	9.8	18.4	7.0	4.6
VIII. St. Peter	28.7	33.2	17.1	9.5	4.6	5.7
IX. Waltendorf	27.3	35.5	16.6	8.4	4.4	7.0
X. Ries	28.2	32.8	16.9	9.5	4.7	6.8
XI. Mariatrost	26.5	36.7	17.0	8.3	3.9	6.5
XII. Andritz	28.2	32.5	16.5	10.1	6.3	5.3
XIII. Gösting	32.6	25.3	10.4	17.6	6.7	5.7
XIV. Eggenberg	38.3	20.9	14.2	13.7	6.7	4.5
XV. Wetzelsdorf	33.0	24.0	9.8	20.0	8.1	3.3
XVI. Straßgang	30.1	26.1	9.0	21.5	7.9	4.0
XVII. Puntigam	31.0	24.4	8.6	23.6	6.6	3.8
Total	35.7	25.3	14.9	12.0	5.6	4.9
Source: Stadt Graz
