= Kurt Egger =

Kurt Egger may refer to:

- Kurt Egger (Swiss politician)
- Kurt Egger (Austrian politician)

== See also ==
- Kurt Eggers, German writer
