= Greater Graz (National Council electoral district) =

Parliamentary electoral district in Austria

- Graz und Umgebung
- Electoral District for the National Council
- Location of Greater Graz within Austria
- District: List: Graz City; Greater Graz
- State: Styria
- Population: 466,471 (2024)
- Electorate: 317,873 (2019)
- Area: 1,212 km^{2} (2023)

Current Electoral District
- Created: 2013
- Seats: 9 (2013–present)
- Members: List: Kurt Egger (ÖVP); Ernst Gödl (ÖVP); Heike Grebien (GRÜNE); Axel Kassegger (FPÖ); Verena Nussbaum (SPÖ)
- Created from: List: Graz; Styria Centre

Greater Graz (German: Graz und Umgebung), also known as Electoral District 6A (German: Wahlkreis 6A), is one of the 39 multi-member regional electoral districts of the National Council, the lower house of the Austrian Parliament, the national legislature of Austria. The electoral district was established in 2012 following the re-organisation of the regional electoral districts in Styria to reflect the new administrative district structure and came into being at the following legislative election in 2013. It consists of the city of Graz and the district of Greater Graz in the state of Styria. The electoral district currently elects nine of the 183 members of the National Council using the open party-list proportional representation electoral system. At the 2019 legislative election the constituency had 317,873 registered electors.

== History ==
Greater Graz was established in 2012 following the re-organisation of the regional electoral districts in Styria to reflect the new administrative district structure. It consisted of the city of Graz and the district of Greater Graz in the state of Styria. The district was initially allocated eight seats in April 2013. Electoral regulations require the allocation of seats amongst the electoral districts to be recalculated following each national census and in June 2013 the number of seats allocated to Greater Graz was increased to nine based on the population as at the 2011 national census.

== Electoral system ==
Greater Graz currently elects nine of the 183 members of the National Council using the open party-list proportional representation electoral system. The allocation of seats is carried out in three stages. In the first stage, seats are allocated to parties (lists) at the regional level using a state-wide Hare quota (wahlzahl) (valid votes in the state divided by the number of seats in the state). In the second stage, seats are allocated to parties at the state/provincial level using the state-wide Hare quota (any seats won by the party at the regional stage are subtracted from the party's state seats). In the third and final stage, seats are allocated to parties at the federal/national level using the D'Hondt method (any seats won by the party at the regional and state stages are subtracted from the party's federal seats). Only parties that reach the 4% national threshold, or have won a seat at the regional stage, compete for seats at the state and federal stages.

Electors may cast one preferential vote for individual candidates at the regional, state and federal levels. Split-ticket voting (panachage), or voting for more than one candidate at each level, is not permitted and will result in the ballot paper being invalidated. At the regional level, candidates must receive preferential votes amounting to at least 14% of the valid votes cast for their party to over-ride the order of the party list (10% and 7% respectively for the state and federal levels).

== Election results ==
=== Summary ===
Election	Communists KPÖ+ / KPÖ			Social Democrats SPÖ			Greens GRÜNE			NEOS NEOS			People's ÖVP			Freedom FPÖ		
Election	Votes	%	Seats	Votes	%	Seats	Votes	%	Seats	Votes	%	Seats	Votes	%	Seats	Votes	%	Seats
2019	4,157	1.76%	0	39,701	16.82%	1	51,718	21.91%	1	23,219	9.84%	0	76,008	32.20%	2	34,487	14.61%	1
2017	4,859	1.95%	0	64,789	26.02%	2	12,290	4.93%	0	18,569	7.46%	0	71,375	28.66%	2	59,011	23.70%	2
2013	6,040	2.68%	0	45,054	19.99%	1	39,800	17.66%	1	13,409	5.95%	0	39,887	17.70%	1	49,486	21.96%	1

=== Detailed ===
==== 2019 ====
Results of the 2019 legislative election held on 29 September 2019:

Party		Votes per district			Total votes	%	Seats
Party		Graz City	Greater Graz	Voting card	Total votes	%	Seats
Austrian People's Party	ÖVP	40,705	34,853	450	76,008	32.20%	2
The Greens – The Green Alternative	GRÜNE	38,580	12,407	731	51,718	21.91%	1
Social Democratic Party of Austria	SPÖ	23,252	16,221	228	39,701	16.82%	1
Freedom Party of Austria	FPÖ	16,921	17,392	174	34,487	14.61%	1
NEOS – The New Austria and Liberal Forum	NEOS	15,782	7,083	354	23,219	9.84%	0
JETZT	JETZT	3,936	1,561	78	5,575	2.36%	0
KPÖ Plus	KPÖ+	3,174	960	23	4,157	1.76%	0
Der Wandel	WANDL	788	373	13	1,174	0.50%	0
Valid Votes		143,138	90,850	2,051	236,039	100.00%	5
Rejected Votes		957	791	9	1,757	0.74%	
Total Polled		144,095	91,641	2,060	237,796	74.81%	
Registered Electors		196,811	121,062		317,873		
Turnout		73.21%	75.70%		74.81%		

The following candidates were elected:

- Personal mandates - Werner Kogler (GRÜNE), 12,991 votes.
- Party mandates - Juliane Bogner-Strauß (ÖVP), 5,274 votes; Ernst Gödl (ÖVP), 5,670 votes; Axel Kassegger (FPÖ), 634 votes; and Verena Nussbaum (SPÖ), 1,733 votes.

Substitutions:

- Juliane Bogner-Strauß (ÖVP) resigned on 18 December 2019 and was replaced by Martina Kaufmann (ÖVP).
- Werner Kogler (GRÜNE) resigned on 7 January 2020 and was replaced by Heike Grebien (GRÜNE) on 9 January 2020.
- Martina Kaufmann (ÖVP) was reassigned to the Styria seat vacated by Karl Schmidhofer and was replaced by Kurt Egger (ÖVP) in Greater Graz on 1 October 2021.

==== 2017 ====
Results of the 2017 legislative election held on 15 October 2017:

Party		Votes per district			Total votes	%	Seats
Party		Graz City	Greater Graz	Voting card	Total votes	%	Seats
Austrian People's Party	ÖVP	41,050	29,777	548	71,375	28.66%	2
Social Democratic Party of Austria	SPÖ	41,402	22,824	563	64,789	26.02%	2
Freedom Party of Austria	FPÖ	29,267	29,497	247	59,011	23.70%	2
NEOS – The New Austria and Liberal Forum	NEOS	12,958	5,281	330	18,569	7.46%	0
Peter Pilz List	PILZ	11,041	3,874	204	15,119	6.07%	0
The Greens – The Green Alternative	GRÜNE	9,467	2,649	174	12,290	4.93%	0
Communist Party of Austria	KPÖ	3,952	865	42	4,859	1.95%	0
My Vote Counts!	GILT	1,440	889	24	2,353	0.94%	0
Free List Austria	FLÖ	184	173	1	358	0.14%	0
The Whites	WEIßE	178	132	5	315	0.13%	0
Valid Votes		150,939	95,961	2,138	249,038	100.00%	6
Rejected Votes		826	656	6	1,488	0.59%	
Total Polled		151,765	96,617	2,144	250,526	78.86%	
Registered Electors		197,958	119,731		317,689		
Turnout		76.67%	80.70%		78.86%		

The following candidates were elected:

- Party mandates - Ernst Gödl (ÖVP), 7,177 votes; Karin Greiner (SPÖ), 832 votes; Axel Kassegger (FPÖ), 1,351 votes; Martina Kaufmann (ÖVP), 3,393 votes; Günther Kumpitsch (FPÖ), 818 votes; and Verena Nussbaum (SPÖ), 2,542 votes.

==== 2013 ====
Results of the 2013 legislative election held on 29 September 2013:

Party		Votes per district			Total votes	%	Seats
Party		Graz City	Greater Graz	Voting card	Total votes	%	Seats
Freedom Party of Austria	FPÖ	26,293	23,027	166	49,486	21.96%	1
Social Democratic Party of Austria	SPÖ	25,242	19,595	217	45,054	19.99%	1
Austrian People's Party	ÖVP	23,222	16,340	325	39,887	17.70%	1
The Greens – The Green Alternative	GRÜNE	29,574	9,691	535	39,800	17.66%	1
Team Stronach	FRANK	9,895	9,326	84	19,305	8.57%	0
NEOS – The New Austria	NEOS	9,568	3,656	185	13,409	5.95%	0
Alliance for the Future of Austria	BZÖ	5,172	3,568	71	8,811	3.91%	0
Communist Party of Austria	KPÖ	4,627	1,389	24	6,040	2.68%	0
Pirate Party of Austria	PIRAT	2,186	718	36	2,940	1.30%	0
Christian Party of Austria	CPÖ	339	295	0	634	0.28%	0
Valid Votes		136,118	87,605	1,643	225,366	100.00%	4
Rejected Votes		1,570	1,136	21	2,727	1.20%	
Total Polled		137,688	88,741	1,664	228,093	72.80%	
Registered Electors		196,557	116,758		313,315		
Turnout		70.05%	76.00%		72.80%		

The following candidates were elected:

- Personal mandates - Gerald Klug (SPÖ), 6,711 votes.
- Party mandates - Mario Kunasek (FPÖ), 3,618 votes; Bernd Schönegger (ÖVP), 1,227 votes; and Judith Schwentner (GRÜNE), 1,985 votes. (Note: ÖVP: 1st placed candidate Beatrix Karl was elected in Styria.)

Substitutions:

- Gerald Klug (SPÖ) resigned on 16 December 2013 and was replaced by Michael Ehmann (SPÖ) on 17 December 2013.
- Mario Kunasek (FPÖ) resigned on 15 June 2015 and was replaced by Günther Kumpitsch (FPÖ) on 16 June 2015.
- Michael Ehmann (SPÖ) resigned on 18 May 2016 and was replaced by Gerald Klug (SPÖ) on 19 May 2016.
