= Verena Nussbaum =

Austrian politician (born 1970)

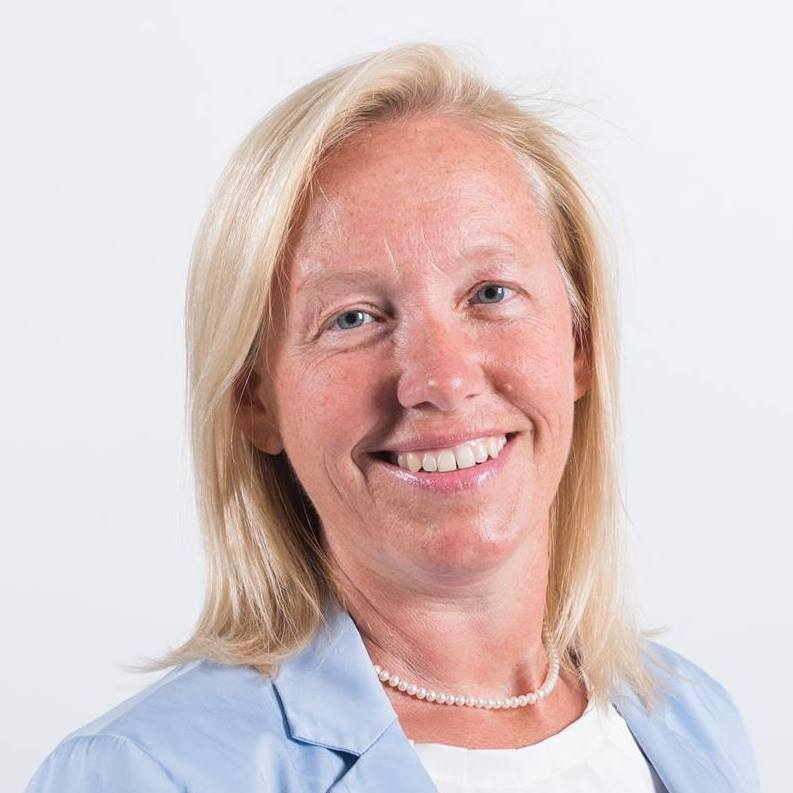
- Nussbaum in October 2017

Member of the National Council
- Incumbent
- Assumed office 9 November 2017
- Constituency: Greater Graz

Personal details
- Born: 19 February 1970 (age 56) Graz, Austria
- Party: Social Democratic Party
- Education: University of Graz

Verena Nussbaum (born 19 February 1970) is an Austrian politician and member of the National Council. A member of the Social Democratic Party, she has represented Greater Graz since November 2017.

Nussbaum was born on 19 February 1970 in Graz. She studied law at the University of Graz (1988–1996). She has worked for the Union of Private Sector Employees (GPA) and its successor the Union of Private Sector Employees, Printing, Journalism, and Paper (GPA-DJP) since 1998. She was on board the Styrian Regional Health Insurance Fund (STGKK) from 2009 to 2018 and served as its chair from 2013 to 2018. She has held various positions in the Graz and Styrian branches of the Social Democratic Party (SPÖ) since 2014. She was elected to the National Council at the 2017 legislative election.

Electoral history of Verena Nussbaum
Election	Electoral district	Party	Votes	%	Result
2017 legislative	Greater Graz	Social Democratic Party	2,542	3.92%	Elected
2017 legislative	Styria	Social Democratic Party	276	0.14%	Not elected
2019 legislative	Greater Graz	Social Democratic Party	1,733	4.37%	Elected
2019 legislative	Styria	Social Democratic Party	168	0.12%	Not elected
