= Heike Grebien =

Austrian politician (born 1987)

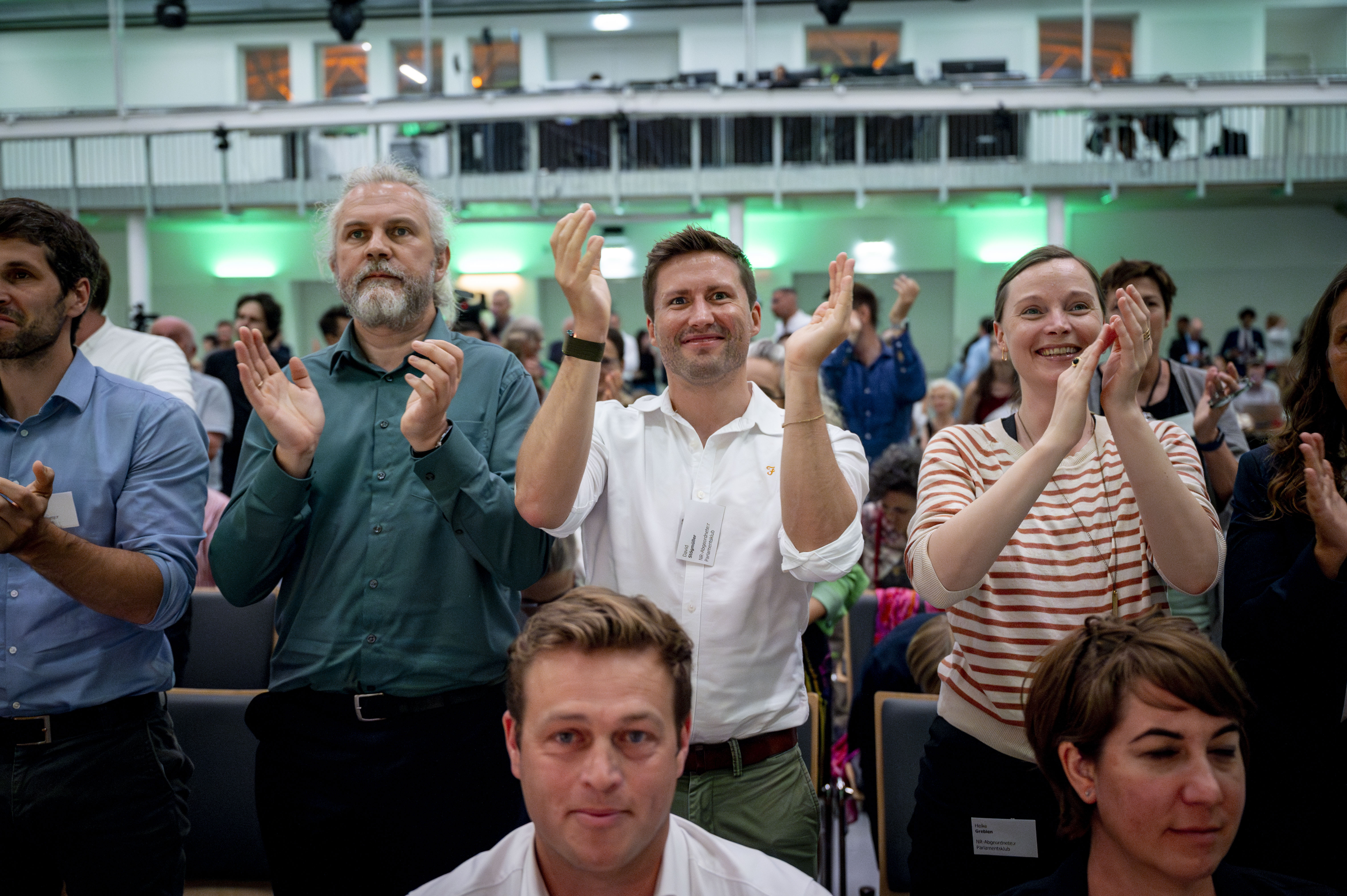
- Grebien in 2024

Member of the National Council
- Incumbent
- Assumed office 9 January 2020
- Preceded by: Werner Kogler
- Constituency: Greater Graz

Personal details
- Born: 31 July 1987 (age 38)
- Party: The Greens – The Green Alternative

Heike Grebien (born 31 July 1987) is an Austrian politician of The Greens. Since 2020, she has been a member of the National Council. She succeeded Werner Kogler, who took office as vice-chancellor of Austria.
