= Günther Kumpitsch =

Austrian politician (born 1960)

Member of the National Council
- Incumbent
- Assumed office 16 June 2015
- Constituency: Greater Graz

Personal details
- Born: 7 July 1960 (age 65)
- Party: Freedom Party of Austria

Günther Kumpitsch (born 7 July 1960) is an Austrian politician who has been a Member of the National Council for the Freedom Party of Austria (FPÖ) since 2015.
