= Werner Kogler =

Austrian politician (born 1961)

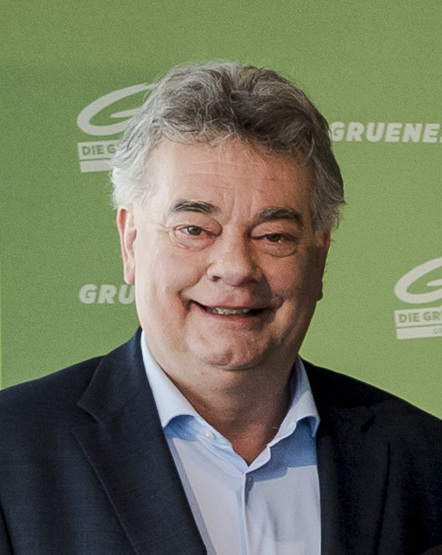
- Kogler in 2023

Vice Chancellor of Austria
- In office 7 January 2020 – 2 October 2024
- Chancellor: Sebastian Kurz; Alexander Schallenberg; Karl Nehammer
- Preceded by: Clemens Jabloner
- Succeeded by: Andreas Babler

Minister for Arts, Culture, the Civil Service and Sport
- In office 7 January 2020 – 3 March 2025
- Chancellor: Sebastian Kurz; Alexander Schallenberg; Karl Nehammer
- Preceded by: Eduard Müller
- Succeeded by: Andreas Babler

Spokesperson of the Green Party
- In office 17 October 2017 – 29 June 2025
- Preceded by: Ingrid Felipe
- Succeeded by: Leonore Gewessler

Member of the National Council
- In office 23 October 2019 – 7 January 2020
- Succeeded by: Heike Grebien
- Constituency: Greater Graz
- In office 29 October 1999 – 8 November 2017
- Constituency: 6 – Styria

Personal details
- Born: 20 November 1961 (age 64) Hartberg, Styria, Austria
- Party: The Greens
- Education: University of Graz

Werner Kogler (Note: German pronunciation: [ˈvɛʁnɐ ˈkoːglɐ]) (born 20 November 1961) is an Austrian politician of the Green Party who served as Vice-Chancellor of Austria from 2020 to 2024 and as minister for Arts, Culture, the Civil Service and Sport in the governments of chancellors Sebastian Kurz, Alexander Schallenberg, and Karl Nehammer from 2020 to 2025.

Kogler has served as federal spokesman of the Green Party from October 2017 till June 2025. He was a member of the National Council of Austria from 1999-2017 and again from 2019.

== Early life and career ==
Kogler was born in the small east Styrian town of Hartberg. He completed his Matura in 1980 and subsequently studied economics and law at the University of Graz. In 1994, he graduated with a master's degree in economics.

== Political career ==
=== Early beginnings ===
Kogler formed the Alternative List Graz and, in 1982, he was one of the founders of the Alternative List Austria, which merged with the United Greens of Austria to become the current Green Party. In 1985, he was elected to the municipal council of Graz.

=== Member of the National Council ===
In 1999, Kogler won election to the National Council. He served the Greens in various positions, including as a member of the federal executive board, and as a representative for the Styrian Greens in 2010. In 2010, Kogler, who was the Greens spokesman on budget issues, delivered a 12-hour, 42-minute speech in opposition to the government's proposed budget, a record breaking filibuster. He spoke against proposed transatlantic trade agreements and, after the government takeover of Hypo Alpe Adria Bank, traveled the country referring to the affair as Hypo-Krimi, the "Hypo whodunnit".

In 2017, the Greens failed to capture the minimum 4.0% of the vote to be seated in the Austrian parliament. Kogler, having lost his seat, took over as the interim party leader from Ingrid Felipe, which was made permanent in 2018. Following the Ibiza affair, Chancellor Sebastian Kurz, terminated his coalition agreement, which led to a vote of no-confidence and a new election in 2019.

During the 2019 election campaign, Kogler expressed a willingness to go into a coalition with the Austrian People's Party, which was expected to win the election. The Greens' campaign pushed for an end to government subsidies of fossil fuel and larger investments into environmental initiatives, including public transport and renewable energy.

In 2019, the Greens re-entered the Austrian parliament, achieving their largest vote total in the party's history with 14% of the vote. From 2019 to 2020, Kogler led coalition negotiations with the Austrian People's Party and with former chancellor Sebastian Kurz. The parties agreed to a legislative program going forward that included the Greens' desire to make Austria carbon neutral by 2030, an overall increase in the air passenger tax and a €3 day ticket for public transport. The program included additional restriction on migrants, an extension of the ban on Islamic headscarves in school and lower personal and corporate tax rates. On 7 January 2020, he became the new vice chancellor of Austria.

== Other activities ==
- National Fund of the Republic of Austria for Victims of National Socialism, Member of the Board of Trustees (since 2020)
