= Judith Schwentner =

Austrian journalist and politician

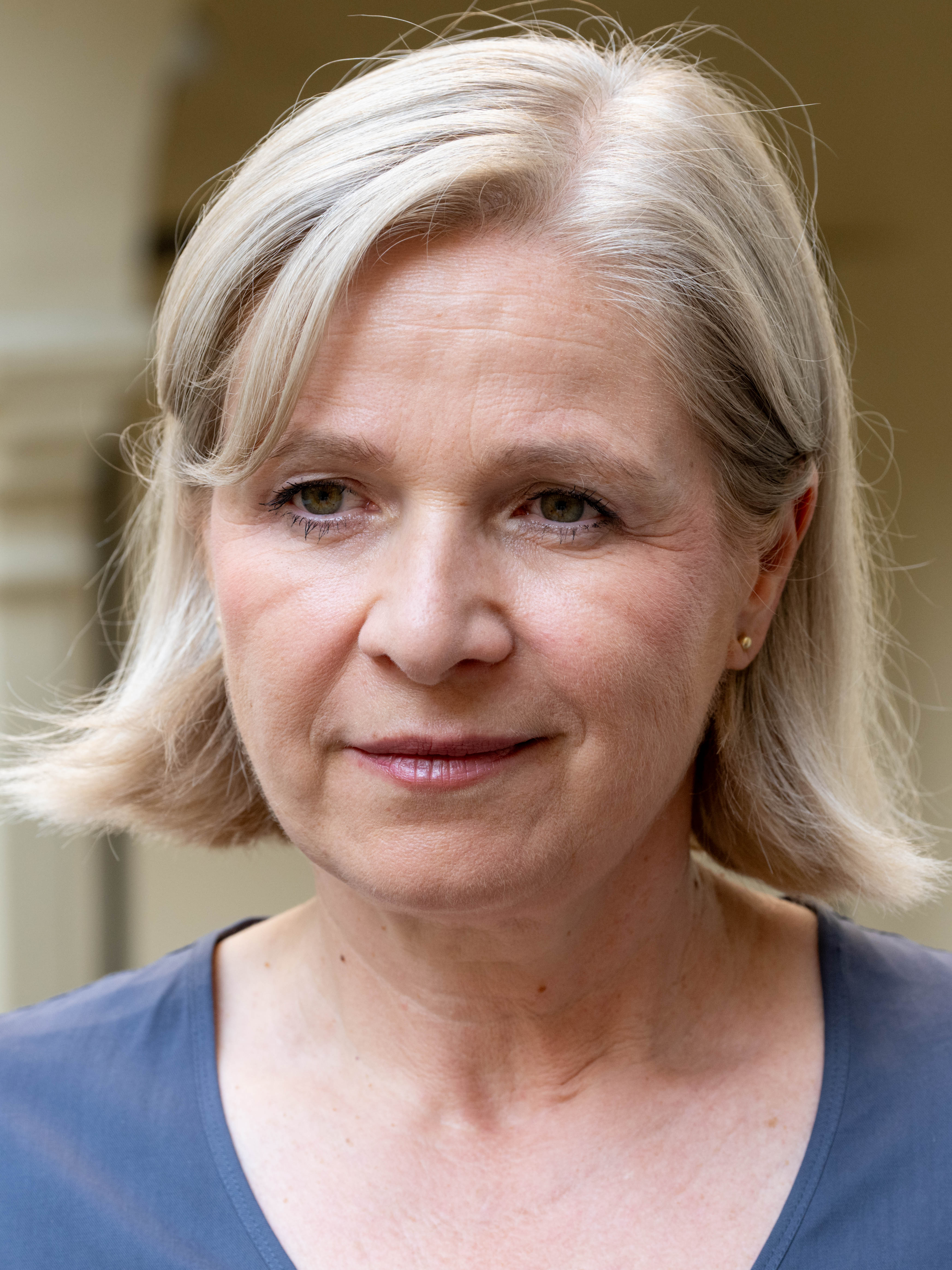
- Schwentner in 2026

Vice-Mayor of Graz
- Incumbent
- Assumed office 17 November 2021

City Councillor of Graz
- Incumbent
- Assumed office 17 January 2019
- Preceded by: Tina Wirnsberger

Member of the Gemeinderat of Graz
- Incumbent
- Assumed office 17 November 2021

Member of the National Council
- In office 28 October 2008 – 8 November 2017
- Constituency: Greater Graz

Personal details
- Born: 5 September 1968 (age 57) Graz, Austria
- Party: The Greens

Judith Schwentner (born 2 September 1968) is an Austrian journalist and politician of The Greens who has been Vice Mayor of Graz, the second-largest city in Austria, since 2021. She has also served as councillor in the city government since 2019 and a member of the municipal council since 2021. She previously sat as a member of the National Council from 2008 to 2017.

== Education and professional career ==
After attending an elementary school in the Eggenberg district of Graz and graduating from the Akademisches Gymnasium in 1986, Schwentner began Slavic and German studies at the University of Graz in 1987. She stayed in Moscow from 1992–93 for a research stay, and completed her studies the next year with a thesis on the life and work of the writer Avdotya Panaeva. She completed a supplementary course in "German as a foreign language" in 1993 and, in 2007 and 2008, a course on intercultural counselling for immigrants and organizations at the Innovative Sozialprojekte association.

From 1994 to 1995 Schwenter worked as a foreign lecturer at the University of Lviv in Ukraine. In the following years she returned to Graz and worked in journalism. From 1996 to 2000 she worked in the editorial department of the specialist magazine Camera Austria. She joined the editorial team of the street newspaper Das Megaphon in 1993 and became editor-in-chief from 2004 to 2008.

In 2003, during Graz's year as European Capital of Culture, Schwentner was co-curator of the project SPB.education.discourse.film.rock. Current art from St Petersburg. From 2006 to 2008 she worked for Caritas Austria as head of the departments of development cooperation, children, and foreign aid. She was also director of the intercultural cafe and event centre Auschlössl.

== Political career ==
Shortly before the 2008 federal election, Schwenter received an offer from The Greens to run for the National Council. She agreed to run and was elected as a representative for Greater Graz. In her first term, she was spokesperson for women's issues and development. She was re-elected in 2013 as one of only two directly-elected deputies for her party; the Greens were narrowly the most popular party in Graz. From 2013 to 2017, she was spokesperson for social affairs and senior citizens. She left the National Council when the Greens lost all their seats in the 2017 election.

In January 2019, Schwentner became city councillor in the municipal government of Graz after Tina Wirnsberger resigned for health reasons. She held responsibility for the environment and women's affairs. She was the Greens' lead candidate for the 2021 Graz local election and expressed ambition to become mayor of the city. The Greens won 17.3% of votes and nine seats in the election, placing third. The Communist Party of Austria (KPÖ) became the largest party and entered coalition talks with the Greens and Social Democratic Party of Austria (SPÖ). Schwentner led the Greens in negotiations, which resulted in a coalition agreement between the three parties, with Schwentner serving as deputy to KPÖ leader Elke Kahr. She was elected vice mayor on 17 November, receiving 42 votes out of 46.
