= St. Leonhard (Graz) =

2nd district of Graz, Austria

Coordinates: 47°4′11″N 15°27′7″E

- 2nd city district of Graz
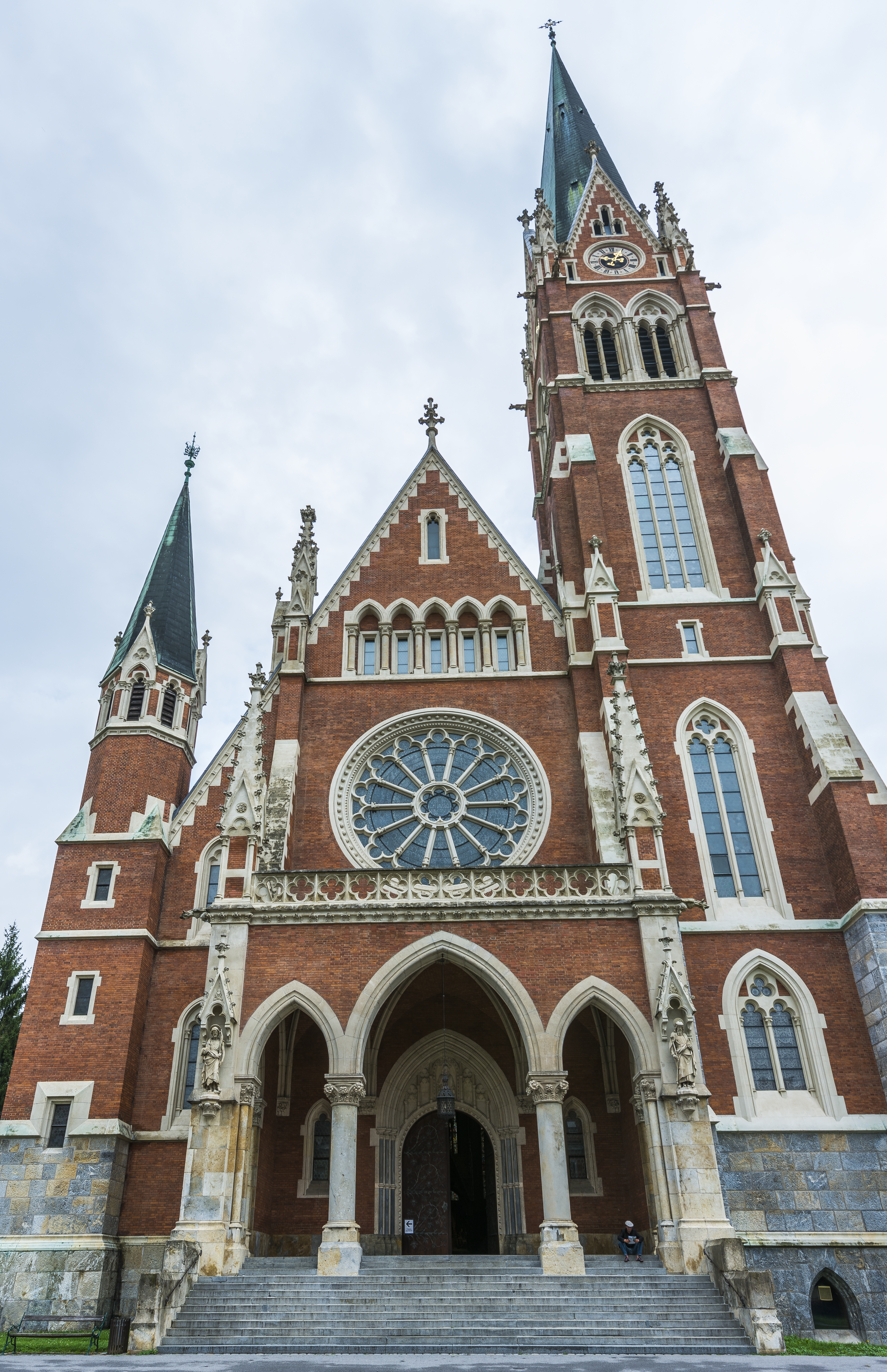
- Herz-Jesu-Church
- Interactive map of St. Leonhard
- Country: Austria
- Province: Styria
- Statutory city: Graz

Area
  - Total: 1.83 km^{2} (0.71 sq mi)

Population (2023)
  - Total: 14,756
  - Density: 8,060/km^{2} (20,900/sq mi)

St. Leonhard (German: [saŋkt ˈleːonhaʁt], in Germany [z-]) is the 2nd district of the Austrian city of Graz. It is located in the east of the city along the Leonhardbach and stretches south to the St. Peter City Cemetery. It borders the district of Geidorf to the north, Ries and Waltendorf to the east, Jakomini to the south and Innere Stadt to the west.

The postal codes of Ries are 8010 and 8016. Within the district are situated the catholic churches of St. Leonhard (first mentioned in 1361) and Herz Jesu (Jesus heart - finished 1887), as well as the Protestant church Heilandskirche.
