= Karin Greiner =

Austrian politician (born 1967)

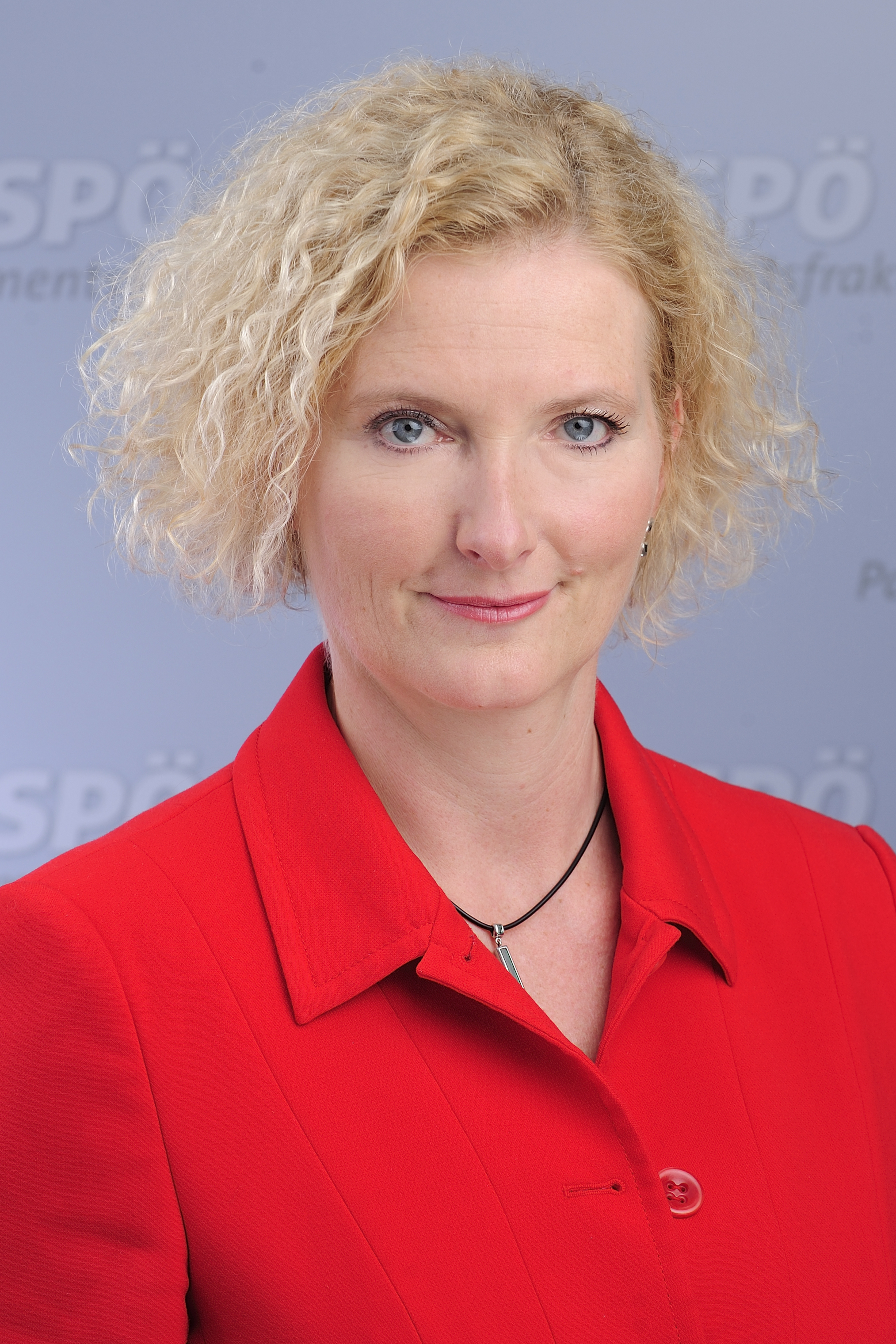
- Greiner in April 2014

Member of the National Council
- Incumbent
- Assumed office 23 October 2019
- Constituency: Styria
- In office 9 November 2017 – 22 October 2019
- Constituency: Greater Graz
- In office 17 December 2013 – 8 November 2017
- Preceded by: Laura Rudas
- Constituency: Federal List
- In office 1 July 2013 – 28 October 2013
- Preceded by: Günther Kräuter
- Constituency: Styria Centre

Personal details
- Born: 4 November 1967 (age 58) Bruck an der Mur, Austria
- Party: Social Democratic Party
- Education: University of Graz

Karin Greiner (born 4 November 1967) is an Austrian politician and member of the National Council. A member of the Social Democratic Party, she has represented Styria since October 2019. She had previously represented Styria Centre (July 2013 to October 2013), the Federal List (December 2013 to November 2017) and Greater Graz (November 2017 to October 2019) in the National Council.

Greiner was born on 4 November 1967 in Bruck an der Mur. She trained to be a translator of Spanish and French at the University of Graz from 1986 to 1993 and has a Magistra der Philosophie degree from the university. She worked for the Security Directorate Styria (Sicherheitsdirektion Steiermark (1993–1994) and State School Board Styria (Landesschulrat Steiermark (1994–1996). She lectured in Spanish at the Economic Development Institute Styria (WIFI) in 1997 before working as a supervisor at the Universalmuseum Joanneum from 1997 to 1998. She managed the adult education centre for Judendorf-Straßengel/Gratkorn/Gratwein between 1997 and 2000. She has been an employee of the municipal council in Graz since 1998.

Greiner has held various positions in the Gratwein-Straßengel, Voitsberg, Greater Graz District and Styrian branches of the Social Democratic Party (SPÖ) since 2011. She was a member of the municipal councils in Judendorf-Straßengel from 2000 to 2014 and in Gratwein-Straßengel from April 2015 to May 2021. She was appointed to the National Council in July 2013 following the resignation of Günther Kräuter. She was not re-elected at the 2013 legislative election but she was appointed to the National Council again in December 2013 as a Federal List member following the reassignment of Laura Rudas to the Vienna South West seat vacated by Doris Bures.

Electoral history of Karin Greiner
Election	Electoral district	Party	Votes	%	Result
1999 legislative	Styria Centre	Social Democratic Party	85	0.21%	Not elected
1999 legislative	Styria	Social Democratic Party	2	0.00%	Not elected
2002 legislative	Styria Centre	Social Democratic Party	188	0.40%	Not elected
2002 legislative	Styria	Social Democratic Party	0	0.00%	Not elected
2006 legislative	Styria Centre	Social Democratic Party	125	0.27%	Not elected
2006 legislative	Styria	Social Democratic Party	7	0.00%	Not elected
2008 legislative	Styria Centre	Social Democratic Party	88	0.24%	Not elected
2008 legislative	Styria	Social Democratic Party	1	0.00%	Not elected
2013 legislative	Greater Graz	Social Democratic Party	299	0.66%	Not elected
2013 legislative	Styria	Social Democratic Party	50	0.03%	Not elected
2013 legislative	Federal List	Social Democratic Party	44	0.00%	Not elected
2017 legislative	Greater Graz	Social Democratic Party	832	1.28%	Elected
2017 legislative	Styria	Social Democratic Party	98	0.05%	Not elected
2017 legislative	Federal List	Social Democratic Party	50	0.00%	Not elected
2019 legislative	Greater Graz	Social Democratic Party	803	2.02%	Not elected
2019 legislative	Styria	Social Democratic Party	95	0.07%	Elected
2019 legislative	Federal List	Social Democratic Party	72	0.01%	Not elected
