= Stadthalle Graz =

Event hall in Jakomini, Graz, Austria

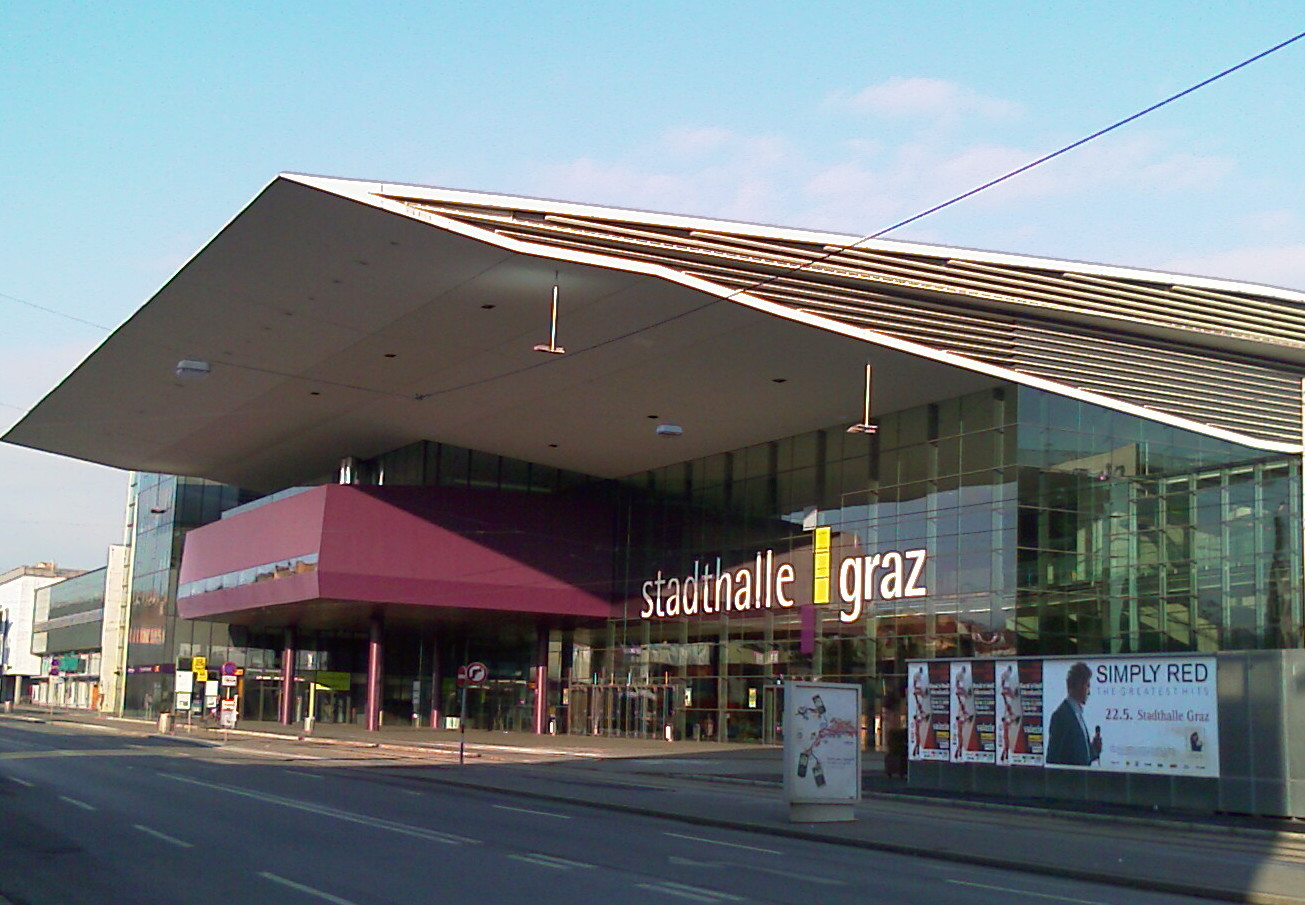
- Stadthalle Graz in December 2008
- Interactive map of Stadthalle Graz
- Location: Jakomini, Graz, Austria
- Coordinates: 47°3′27″N 15°26′50″E
- Operator: Messe Congress Graz BetriebsGmbH (MCG)
- Capacity: 5,561 seated (handball)

Construction
- Groundbreaking: April 2000
- Built: 2000–2002
- Opened: 6 October 2002; 23 years ago
- Renovated: 2019
- Expanded: 2008 (MCG)
- Cost: €38.3 million
- Architect: Klaus Kada
- Project managers: Michael Gattermeyer; Michael Dejori
- Structural engineer: Johann Birner

Stadthalle Graz (also known as Graz Messe Arena) is a multi-functional event hall located in Jakomini, a district of Graz, in Austria. Opened in October 2002, the hall is connected to and part of the municipal's fair building complex, Messe Congress Graz. The facility, the largest in Graz, is used to organize various events, including congresses, TV shows, concerts and sport.

== Construction ==
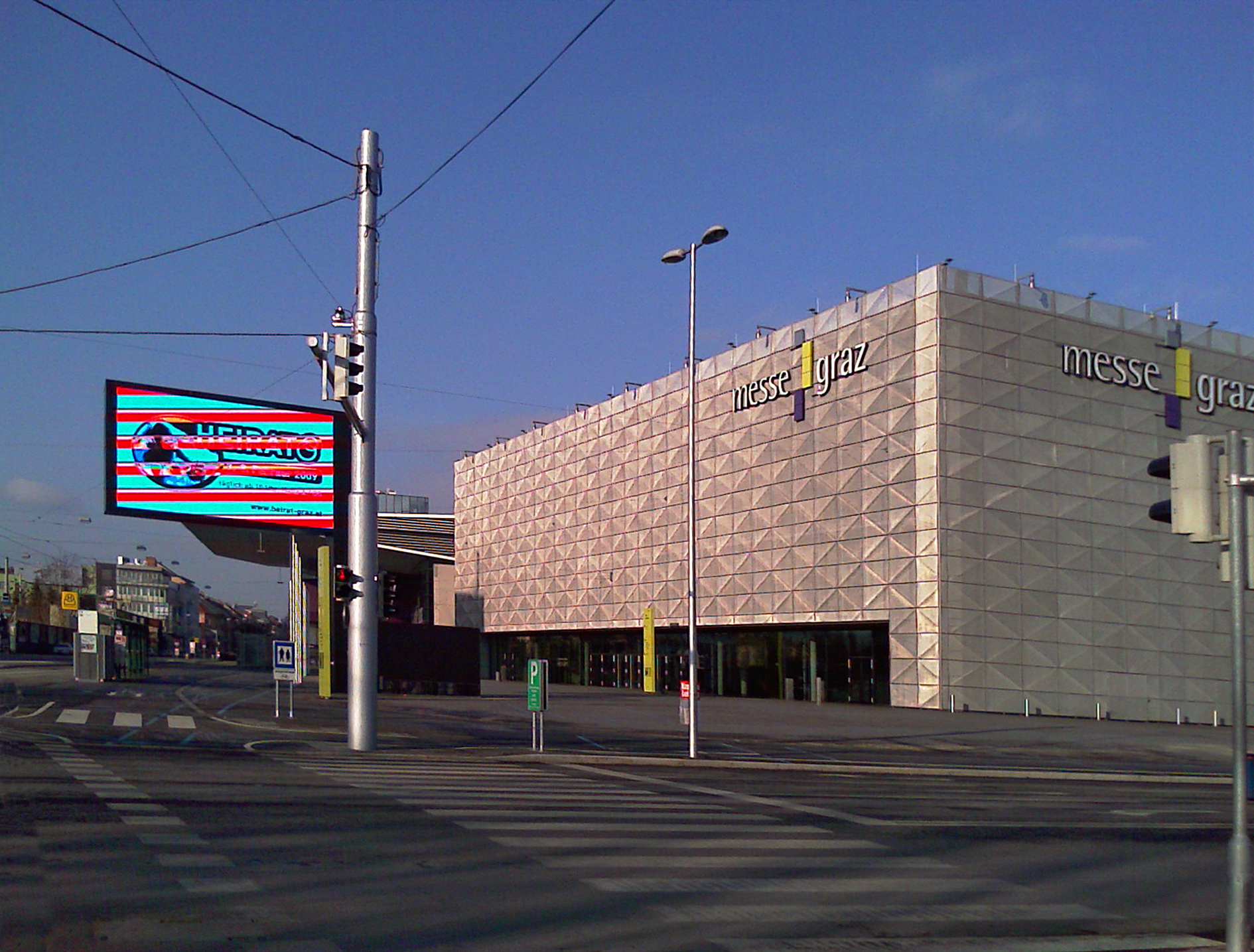
Messe Congress Graz (Hall A), directly beside Stadthalle (2008)

A characteristic element of the facility is the vaulted roof on four pillars, which extends beyond the outline of the arena from the side of the main entrance, also covering the space in front of the entrance and the tram stop located there.

The hall, which can be expanded to a maximum of 20,000 m^{2} for exhibitions and trade fairs, consists of an upper and a ground floor plus an additional 3,000 m^{2} foyer space. Depending on the configuration of the 6,500 m^{2} pillar-free event space, it can accommodate a variable number of guests; the maximum number is 14,520 people (standing only), but in the case of organizing sports competitions, with seating mostly in the grandstands, the capacity is reduced to 5,561 spectators or up to 11,403 when using a standing/seated variant for other events. A terrace and a modern café on the upper floor are available for standing and VIP receptions as well as private events.

The cost of construction amounted to €38.3 million, of which 60% of the amount was covered from the budget of Styria, and 40% from the city of Graz. The main architect of the hall was Klaus Kada. It was built between April 2000 and the beginning of 2002. New lighting systems and flexible grandstands were installed in 2019.

Immediately adjacent to the venue is the subsequently built exhibition hall by the architects Florian Riegler and Roger Riewe which opened in 2008 and now forms part of the complex.

== Events ==
The Stadthalle was used to host the 2008 World Choir Games, which included hosting the opening and closing ceremonies and awards ceremonies, as well as providing catering and various administrative services during the event.

In 2009, it hosted international robotics competition RoboCup. It was already a place for numerous productions for example Wetten, dass..?and Musikantenstadl. On 16 November 2007 and 20 November 2009, TV show and music event The Dome took place in the hall.

Among the sports events that took place in the hall, the most important was the organization of some group matches of the European Men's Handball Championships in 2010 and 2020.

== See also ==
- List of indoor arenas in Austria
