= Kurt Egger (Austrian politician) =

Austrian politician (born 1974)

Member of the National Council
- Incumbent
- Assumed office 1 October 2021
- Preceded by: Martina Kaufmann
- Constituency: Greater Graz

Personal details
- Born: 18 June 1974 (age 51)
- Party: Austrian People's Party

Kurt Egger (born 18 June 1974) is an Austrian politician of the Austrian People's Party serving as a member of the National Council since 2021. He was a municipal councillor of Sankt Bartholomä from 1995 to 2010, and a municipal councillor of Graz from 2017 to 2021.
