= Ernst Gödl =

Austrian politician (born 1971)

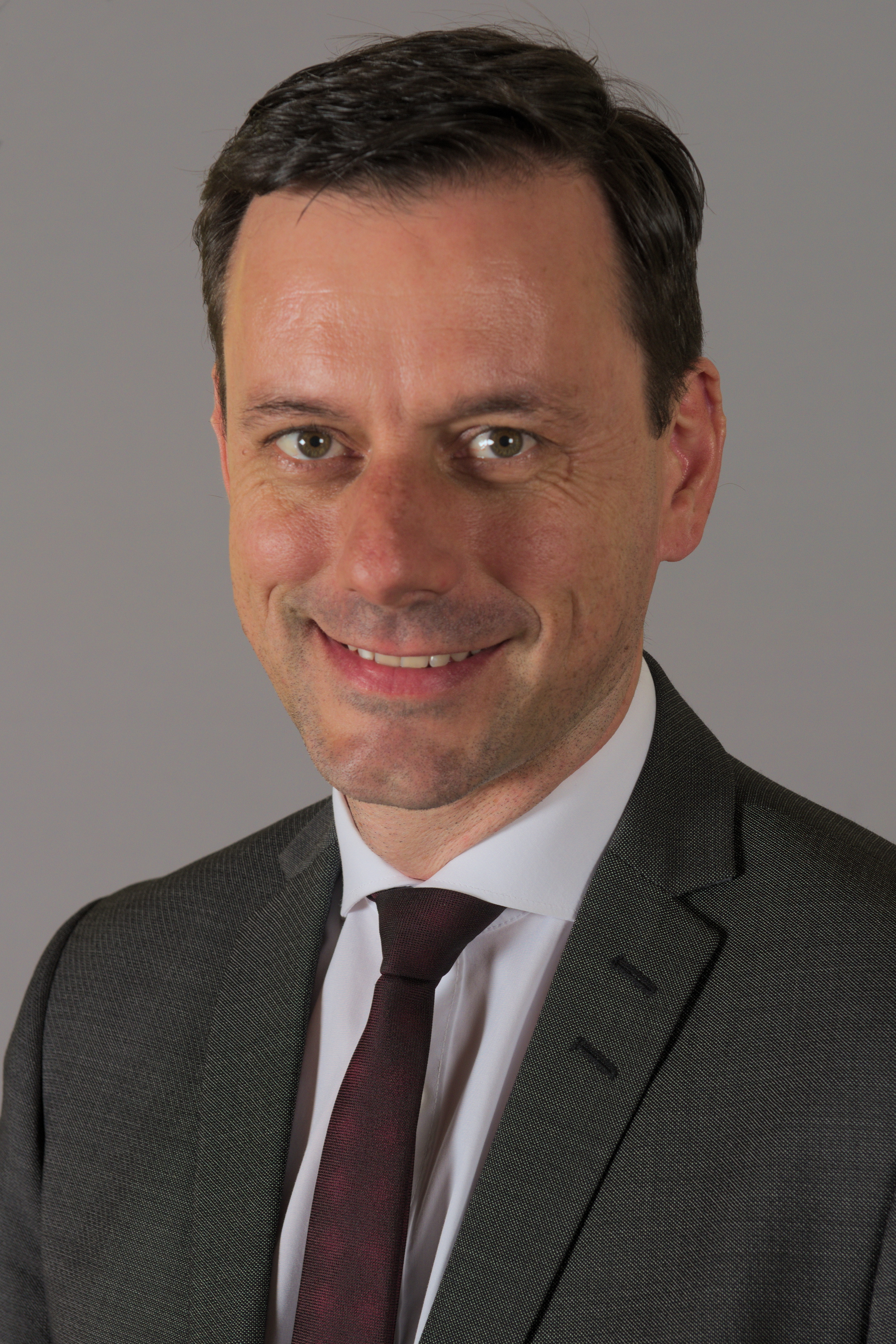
- Gödl in 2017

Member of the National Council
- Incumbent
- Assumed office 9 November 2017
- Constituency: Greater Graz

Member of the Federal Council
- In office 21 January 2014 – 8 November 2017
- Nominated by: Landtag Styria
- Succeeded by: Detlev Eisel-Eiselsberg

Personal details
- Born: 28 December 1971 (age 54)
- Party: People's Party

Ernst Gödl (born 28 December 1971) is an Austrian politician of the People's Party serving as a member of the National Council since 2017. From 2014 to 2017, he was a member of the Federal Council. In May 2026, Gödl was elected leader of his party's parliamentary caucus.
