= Martina Kaufmann =

Austrian politician (born 1986)

Member of the National Council
- Incumbent
- Assumed office 9 November 2017
- Constituency: Greater Graz (2017–2019, 2019–2021); Styria (2019, 2021–present)

Personal details
- Born: 7 January 1986 (age 40)
- Party: Austrian People's Party

Martina Kaufmann (born 7 January 1986) is an Austrian politician of the Austrian People's Party. Since 2017, she has been a member of the National Council. From 2013 to 2017, she was a municipal councillor in Graz. During an election debate in 2019, she came out as gay.
