= Axel Kassegger =

Austrian politician (born 1966)

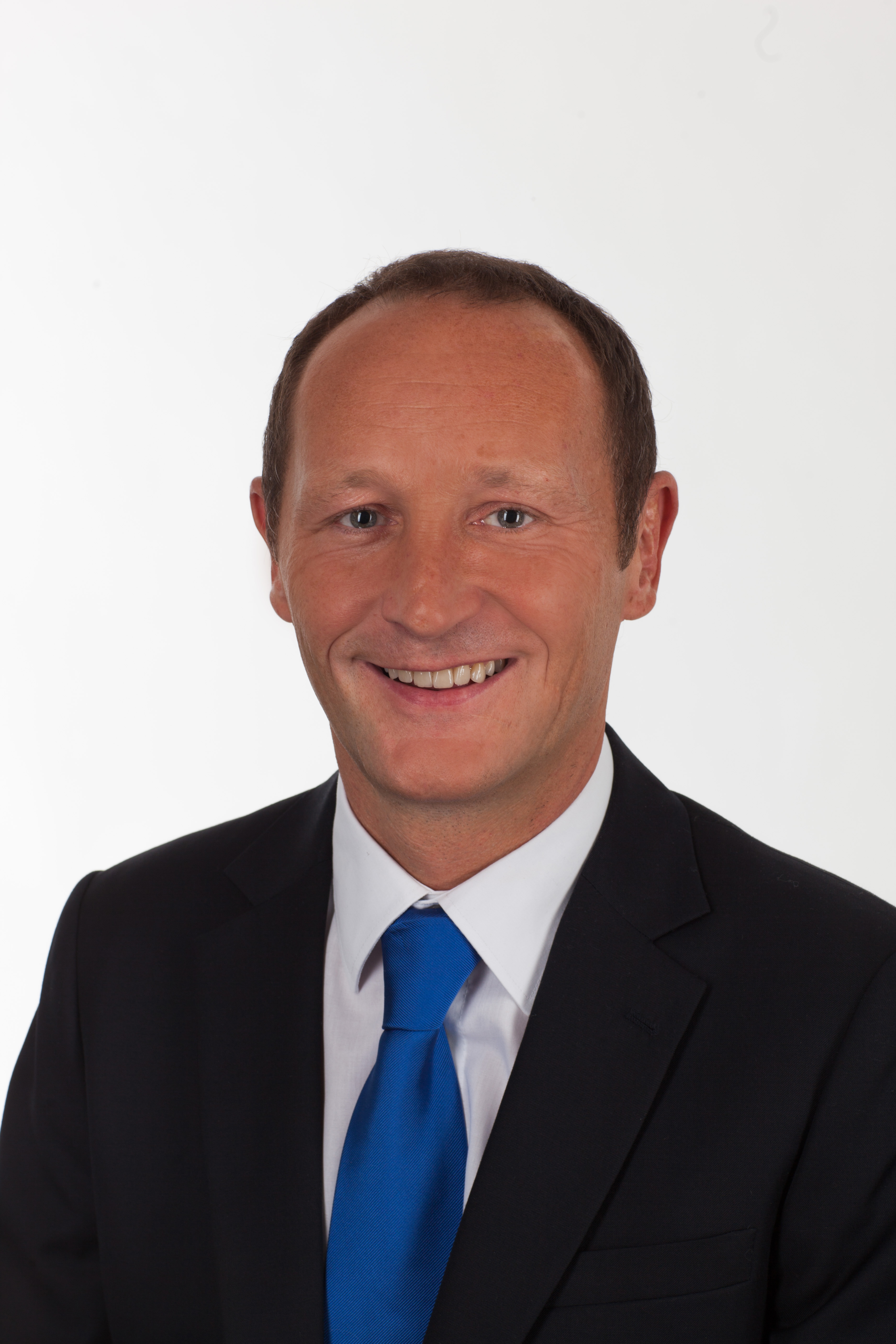

Member of the National Council
- Incumbent
- Assumed office 29 October 2013
- Constituency: 6 Steiermark

Personal details
- Born: 4 January 1966 (age 60)
- Party: Freedom Party of Austria

Axel Kassegger (born 4 January 1966) is an Austrian politician who has been a Member of the National Council for the Freedom Party of Austria (FPÖ) since 2013.

== Career ==
In 2016, Kassegger was an attendee of the Yalta International Economic Forum. According to an OCCRP investigation, the group intended to pay him 4,000 euros to attend the forum, in addition to covering travel costs; he denied ever receiving payments.
