= Ries (Graz) =

District in Graz, Austria

Coordinates: 47°05′N 15°31′E

- 10th city district of Graz
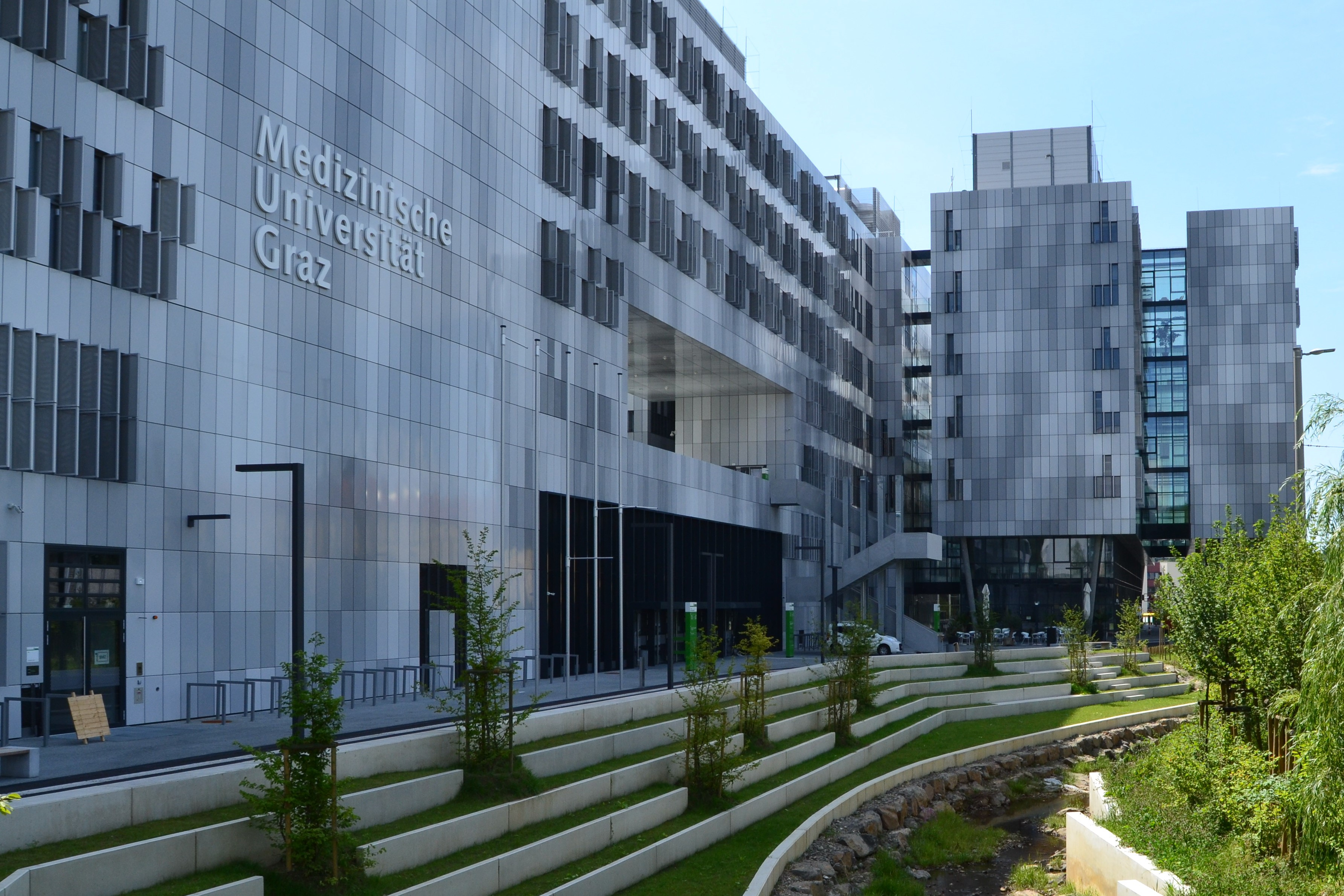
- The medical university of Graz
- Interactive map of Ries
- Country: Austria
- Province: Styria
- Statutory city: Graz

Area
  - Total: 10.16 km^{2} (3.92 sq mi)

Population (2023)
  - Total: 6,144
  - Density: 604.7/km^{2} (1,566/sq mi)
- Postal code: 8010, 8044 and 8047

Ries (German: [ʁiːs]) is the 10th district of the Austrian city of Graz. It is named after a hill range in it. Ries borders the districts of Mariatrost and Geidorf to the west, and St. Leonhard and Waltendorf to the south. It has a population of 6.144 (01.01.2023) and covers an area of 10.16 square kilometres (3.92 sq mi). The postal codes of Ries are 8010, 8044 and 8047. The medical university of Graz is located in Ries.
