= Waltendorf =

Coordinates: 47°04′00″N 15°28′15″E

- 9th city district of Graz
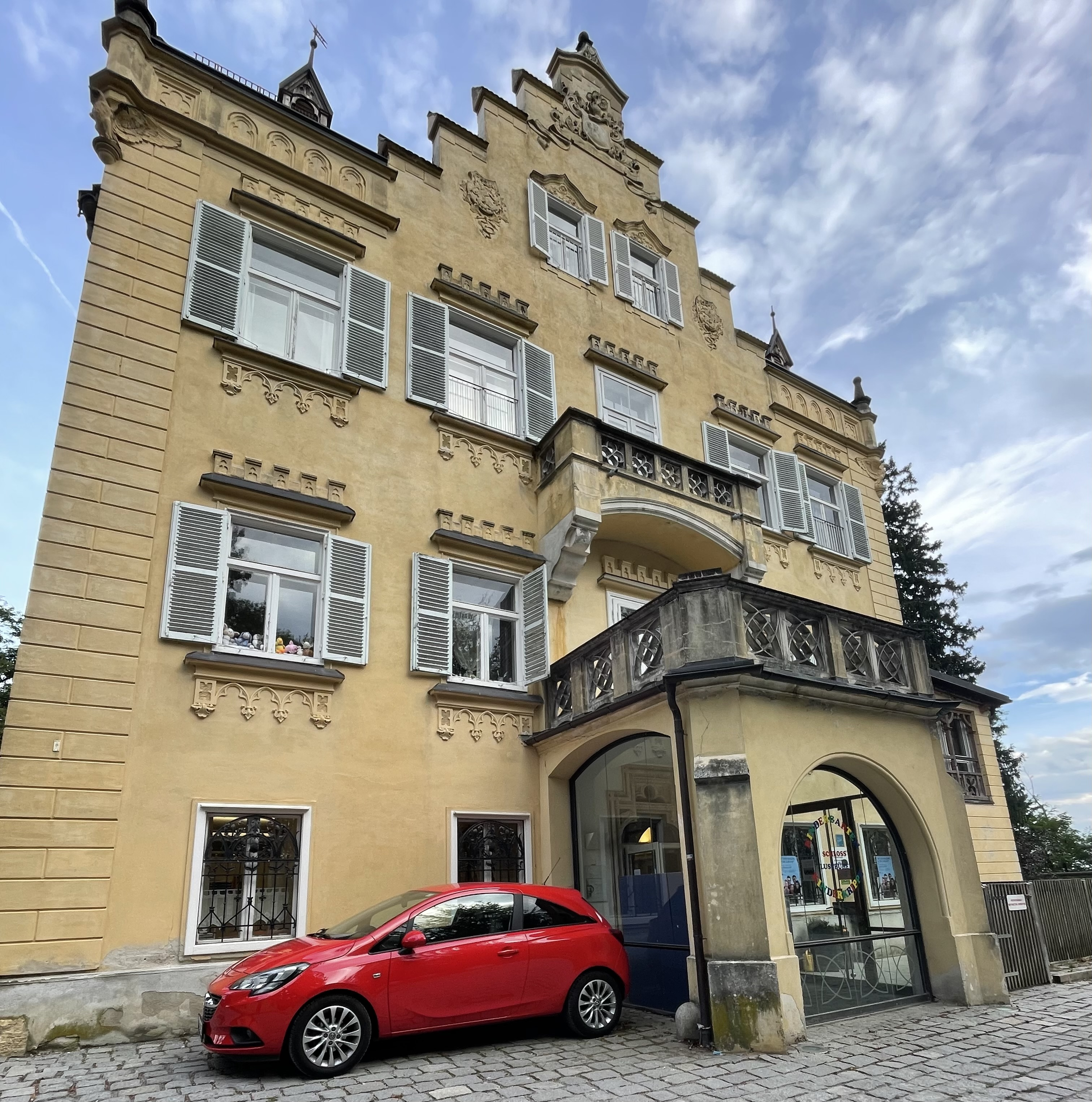
- Schloss Lustbühel
- Interactive map of Waltendorf
- Country: Austria
- Province: Styria
- Statutory city: Graz

Area
  - Total: 4.48 km^{2} (1.73 sq mi)

Population (2023)
  - Total: 12.158
  - Density: 2.71/km^{2} (7.03/sq mi)
- Postal code: 8010, 8042, 8047

Waltendorf (German: [ˈvaltn̩ˌdɔɐ̯f]) is a district of the Austrian city of Graz. It is district number nine and borders the districts of Ries to the north, St. Peter to the south and St. Leonhard mostly to the west. It had a population of 12.158 (January 2023) and covers an area of 4.48 square kilometres. The postal codes of Waltendorf are 8010, 8042 und 8047. There are two small castles in the district the 'Schloss Lustbühel' and the 'Hallerschloss', as well as a church the 'Rupertikirche' in 'Hohenrain'. Within the north of the district, next to the Ragnitz brook, there is one of the largest collection of high-risers in Graz, called 'Berliner Ring'. Some of the high risers have the solar water heating systems on their roof tops. Collectively this solar water system is one of the largest in the city of Graz.
