= Kurt Egger (Swiss politician) =

Swiss politician (born 1956)

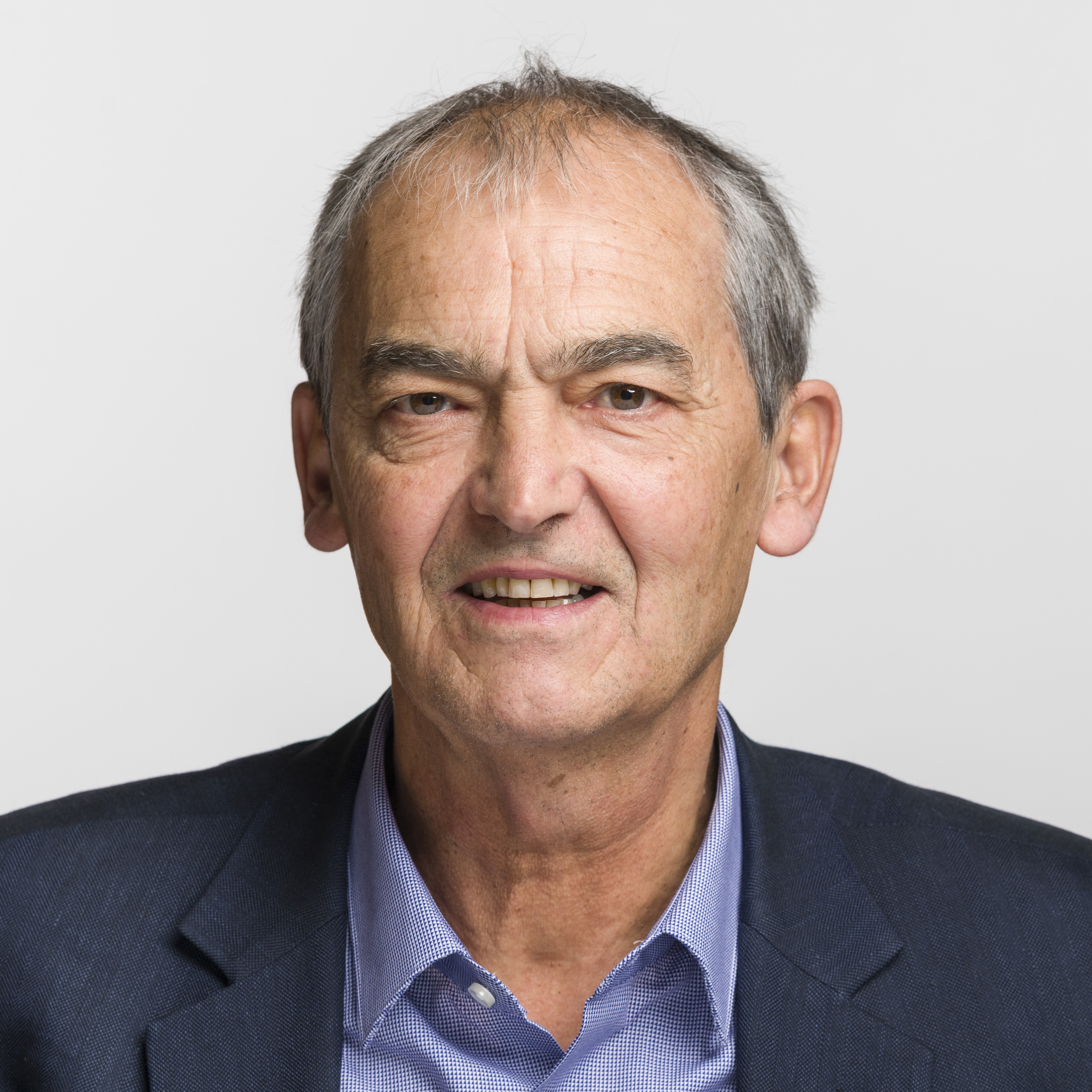
- Kurt Egger (2019)

Member of the National Council (Switzerland)
- Incumbent
- Assumed office December 2, 2019
- Constituency: Canton of Thurgau

Personal details
- Born: Kurt Egger; 19 January 1956 (age 70) St. Gallen
- Citizenship: Swiss
- Party: Green Party of Switzerland
- Occupation: businessman

Kurt Egger (born 19 January 1956 in St. Gallen) is a Swiss politician of the Green Party. He is a member of the Swiss National Council.

== Early life ==
Egger grew up in Wittenbach and went to the high school on Frauenfeld, after which he studied mechanical engineering at ETH Zürich. Since 1996 he is the director of an energy and environmental consulting company Nova Energie GmbH in Sirnach. He is married and lives in Eschlikon.

== Politics ==
From 2012 until 2020, he was a member of the Grand Council of Thurgau, the cantonal legislature. He is president of the local chapter of the green party in Eschlikon and, since 2015, is the president of the cantonal green party. He was voted to represent the green party in the national assembly in the fall elections of 2019.
