= Elke Kahr =

Austrian politician (born 1961)

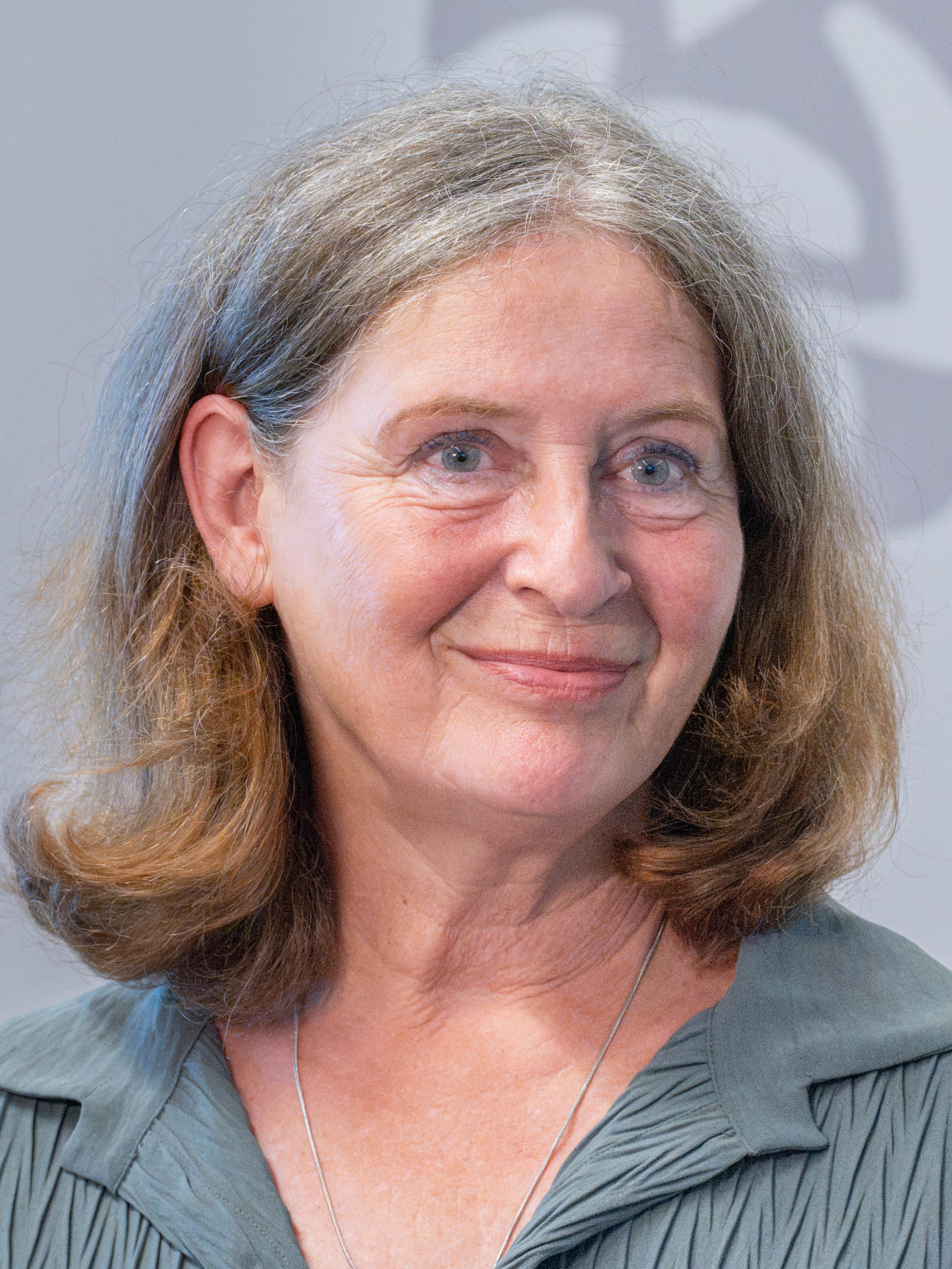
- Kahr in 2026

Mayor of Graz
- Incumbent
- Assumed office 17 November 2021
- Preceded by: Siegfried Nagl

City Councillor of Graz
- In office 2005 – 17 November 2021

Vice-Mayor of Graz
- In office 16 June 2016 – 4 April 2017

Member of the Gemeinderat of Graz
- Incumbent
- Assumed office 1993

Personal details
- Born: 2 November 1961 (age 64) Graz, Austria
- Party: Communist Party of Austria (since 1985)
- Children: 1

Elke Kahr (German: [ˈɛlkɛ kaː(ɐ̯)]; born 2 November 1961) is an Austrian politician of the Communist Party of Austria (KPÖ) who has been serving as mayor of Graz since 2021. She was previously a city councillor in the municipal government since 2005. Between June 2016 and April 2017, she also served as vice mayor of the city.

== Early and personal life ==
Kahr was born in Graz in 1961. Her biological father was a student from Iran, and she was placed for adoption right after birth by her biological mother. She was adopted by Edith and Otto Kahr at three years of age, and grew up in the working-class district of Gries. After finishing elementary and lower secondary school, she attended the Grazbachgasse commercial school, while working at the Oesterreichische Kontrollbank, graduating with the Matura in 1984. She was unemployed for a period until 1985.

Kahr has lived in a partnership with the former KPÖ state party chairman Franz Stephan Parteder since 1988. The couple has a son.

== Political career ==
Kahr officially joined the Communist Party of Austria in 1985. From 1985, she was employed in the KPÖ district management in Graz. She was elected to the city council in 1993, and since 1998 she has chaired the KPÖ council group. In 2003–4 she was deputy federal chairwoman of the KPÖ. She was campaign manager for the party in the 2005 Styrian state election, which saw the KPÖ become the third-largest party and win seats in the Landtag for the first time in 35 years.

After the 2005 state election, popular local KPÖ leader Ernest Kaltenegger left the city council to focus on state politics. Kahr succeeded him as the face of the Graz KPÖ, and replaced him as councillor for housing, a position she held until 2017. The 2008 municipal election saw the party lose 6 of their 12 seats and slide to fourth place. However, it recovered in the following years and, under Kahr's leadership, became the second-largest party in Graz with 20% of the vote in the 2012 election, an unprecedented result.

After the resignation of vice mayor Martina Schröck of the Social Democratic Party of Austria (SPÖ) in 2016, Kahr was elected as her successor. She was confirmed by the Landtag with 38 of 46 votes. Kahr again headed the KPÖ list in the 2017 local election and maintained her party's performance at around 20%. After the election, she lost her housing portfolio and was instead appointed councillor for transport.

== Mayor of Graz ==
Kahr led the KPÖ for a third time in the 2021 Graz local election on 26 September. Despite opinion polling suggesting a victory for the ruling Austrian People's Party (ÖVP), the KPÖ became the largest party with 28.8% of votes and 15 seats, making Kahr the most likely candidate for mayor of the city.

After the election, the KPÖ entered into discussions with the Greens and SPÖ. The three parties agreed to form a coalition government, with the KPÖ holding three city councillors and the Greens one, while the SPÖ take over a number of committees in the city council. Kahr was elected mayor by the Gemeinderat on 17 November, winning 28 out of 46 votes. She became the first female mayor of Graz and first communist mayor of an Austrian city.

In the 2026 Graz local election held on 29 June, the KPÖ made further gains and won in a landslide with almost 36% of the vote.

== Political views and activity ==
Kahr has been active in numerous community and social initiatives since entering politics, and has helped cultivate the Graz KPÖ's emphasis on housing policy. She has become popular due to her work as housing councillor, especially with the "tenant helpline" which provides financial and legal assistance to renters. Between 2004 and 2016, while Kahr was in office as councillor for housing, 960 new community housing units were built and property was acquired for 550 more. She donates two-thirds of her monthly salary to charity, totalling around 900,000 euros by 2014. Since her election as mayor, Kahr has indicated that she would be able to donate more due to her increased salary.

Kahr is a member of the Communist Party and describes herself as a Marxist, but rejects accusations of sympathy for the Soviet Union or similar states. She has told RTL Direkt that Josip Broz Tito's Yugoslavia was "the closest to [her] ideals". In a 2021 interview, she stated that the Communist Party in Graz has "never had a dogmatic relationship to actually existing socialism. We are communists... Of course, crimes have been committed in the history of the communist movement as well, and they need to be openly discussed... Among the many human lives on Stalin’s consciousness were no small number of great communists." She understands politics and society at large as a form of class struggle, explaining: "I want tradespeople and workers to be proud of what they do again, and for employees to maintain self-worth without the label of 'manager'." She has described dictatorship of the proletariat as a 19th-century idea that needs to be "broken down". She supports the nationalisation of "key businesses and facilities that are necessary for everyone", but nothing more. Nonetheless, Kahr emphasises that her focus is on working in the community, and that personal ideology has "no direct use for the people".

In an interview after her election as mayor, Kahr outlined her policy priorities as including building new public housing, increasing the city's rent deposit fund, repealing the ban on non-EU citizens applying for public housing instituted by the city council in 2017, expanding benefits, reducing fees for public kindergartens, and freezing charges for sewage and refuse collection. After the Graz school shooting, Kahr called for a ban on the private ownership of handguns.

== Awards ==
- 2023 World Mayor Prize (Mayor of the year 2023); awarded by City Mayors Foundation.
