= Jakomini =

Coordinates: 47°03′20″N 15°26′51″E

- 6th city district of Graz
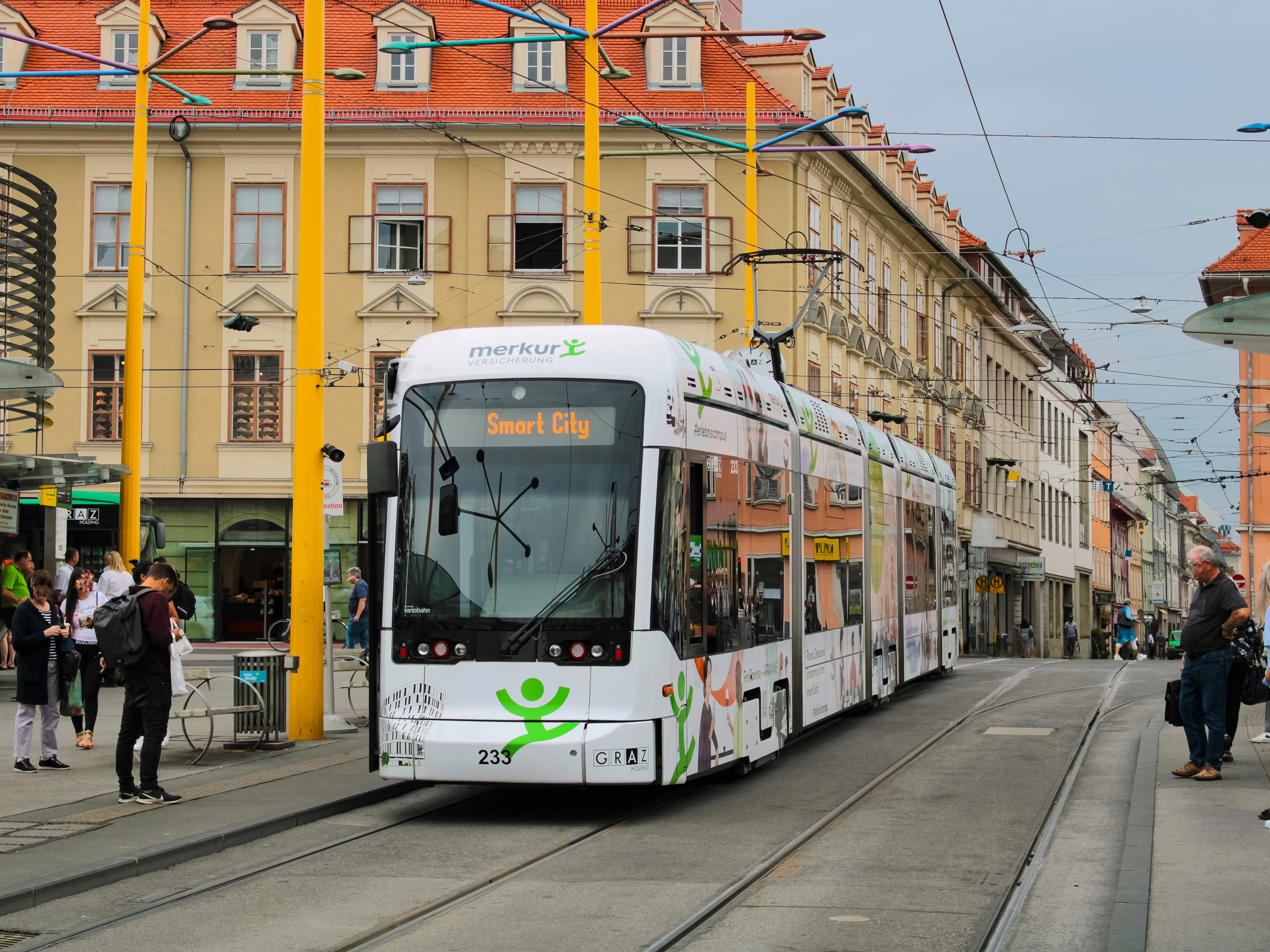
- Streetcar on Jakomini square
- Interactive map of Jakomini
- Country: Austria
- Province: Styria
- Statutory city: Graz

Area
  - Total: 4.06 km^{2} (1.57 sq mi)

Population (2023)
  - Total: 31,412
  - Density: 7,740/km^{2} (20,000/sq mi)

Jakomini (German pronunciation: [jakoˈmiːni]) is the 6th district of Austrian city of Graz. It is named after Kaspar Andreas Ritter von Jacomini and covers an area of 4,06 square kilometers. With a population of 31,412 in 2023 it is the most populous of the districts of Graz. The postal codes of Jakomini are 8010, 8041 and 8042.

== Points of interest ==
- Stadthalle Graz
- Graz University of Technology
- Grazer Herbstmesse
- Jakominiplatz
