= Castle Hill Railway =

Castle Hill Railway or Castle Hill Funicular may refer to:

- Castle Hill Funicular (Budapest), a funicular railway in Budapest, Hungary
- Castle Hill Railway (Bridgnorth), a funicular railway in Bridgnorth, England
- Castle Hill Railway (Freiburg), a funicular railway in Freiburg im Breisgau, Germany
- Castle Hill Railway (Graz), a funicular railway in Graz, Austria

== See also ==
- Castle Hill railway station, Sydney, Australia
