= Schlossbergbahn =

Schlossbergbahn or Schloßbergbahn may refer to:

- The Schlossbergbahn (Freiburg), a funicular railway in the town of Freiburg im Breisgau in Germany.
- The Schlossbergbahn (Graz), a funicular railway in the town of Graz in Austria.
