= Trams in Graz =

Austrian tram system

Graz tramway network

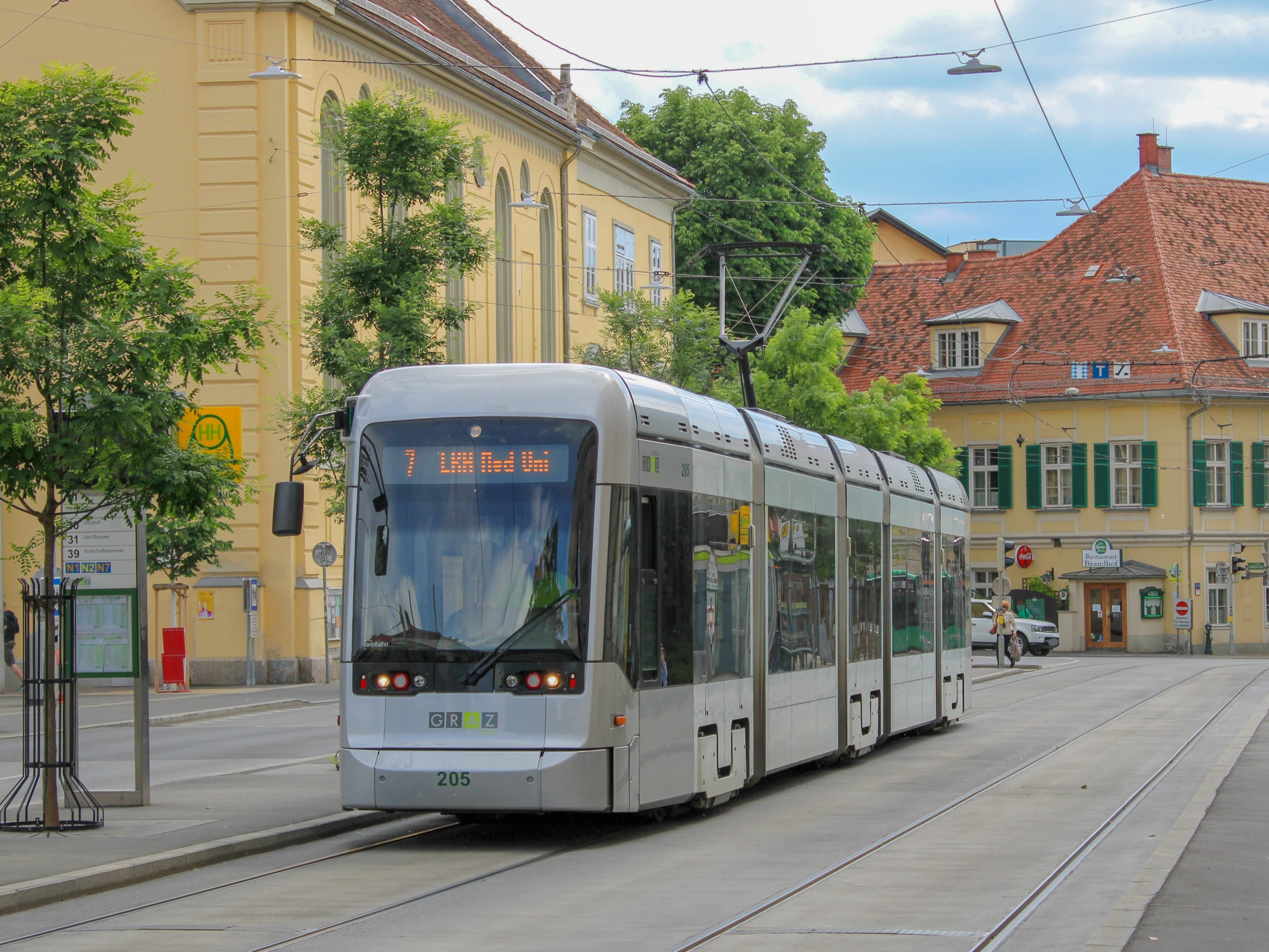
- Variobahn at Kaiser-Josef-Platz (2020)

Operation
- Locale: Graz, Styria, Austria
- Status: Operational
- Lines: 6
- Owner: City of Graz
- Operator: Holding Graz (since 2007)

Infrastructure
- Track gauge: 1,435 mm (4 ft 8 1/2 in) standard gauge
- Minimum curve radius: 17,5 m
- Electrification: 600 V DC
- Depots: Remise I (Alte Poststraße), II and III (Steyrergasse)
- Stock: 86

Statistics
- Route length: 70.4 km (43.7 mi)
- Stops: 95
- Average speed: 70 km/h (43 mph) max.
- 2012: 53.56 million
Horse tram era: 1878–1899
- Owner: Grazer Tramway
- Operator: Grazer Tramway
- Propulsion system: Horses
Electric tram era: 1899–present
- Status: Still running
- Operator: Holding Graz (since 2007)
- Track gauge: 1,435 mm (4 ft 8 1/2 in) standard gauge
- Propulsion system: Electricity
- Electrification: 600 V DC
Overview
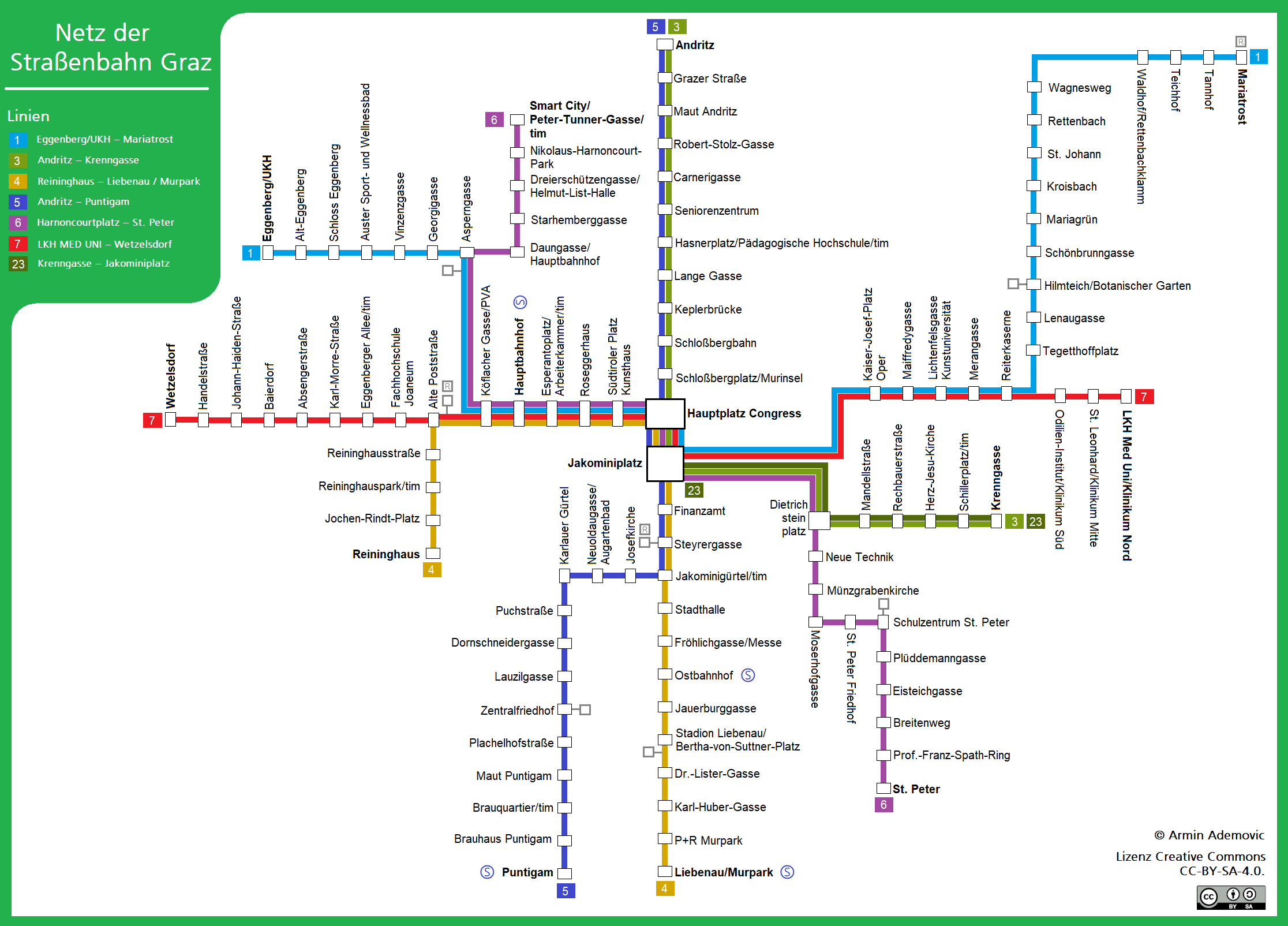
Map of the Graz tram network, 2021.
- Website: https://www.holding-graz.at/linien.html Holding Graz Linien (in German)

The Graz tramway network is a network of tramways forming an important part of the public transport system in Graz, which is both the capital city of the federal state of Styria, Austria, and the second largest city in Austria.

In operation since 1878, the network presently has six daytime lines, and five evening and Sunday lines. As of 2012, the Graz tram network ran on an almost 60 kilometres (37 mi) of route, and served 53.56 million passengers. It is operated by the Graz Linien division of Holding Graz, the city owned utility company who also operate the city's bus network and the Schlossbergbahn funicular railway. The trams form part of the Styrian integrated fare system which covers all modes of public transport in Graz and Styria.

The Tramway Museum Graz, at the terminus of line 1 in Mariatrost, holds many exhibits relating to the system.

== History ==
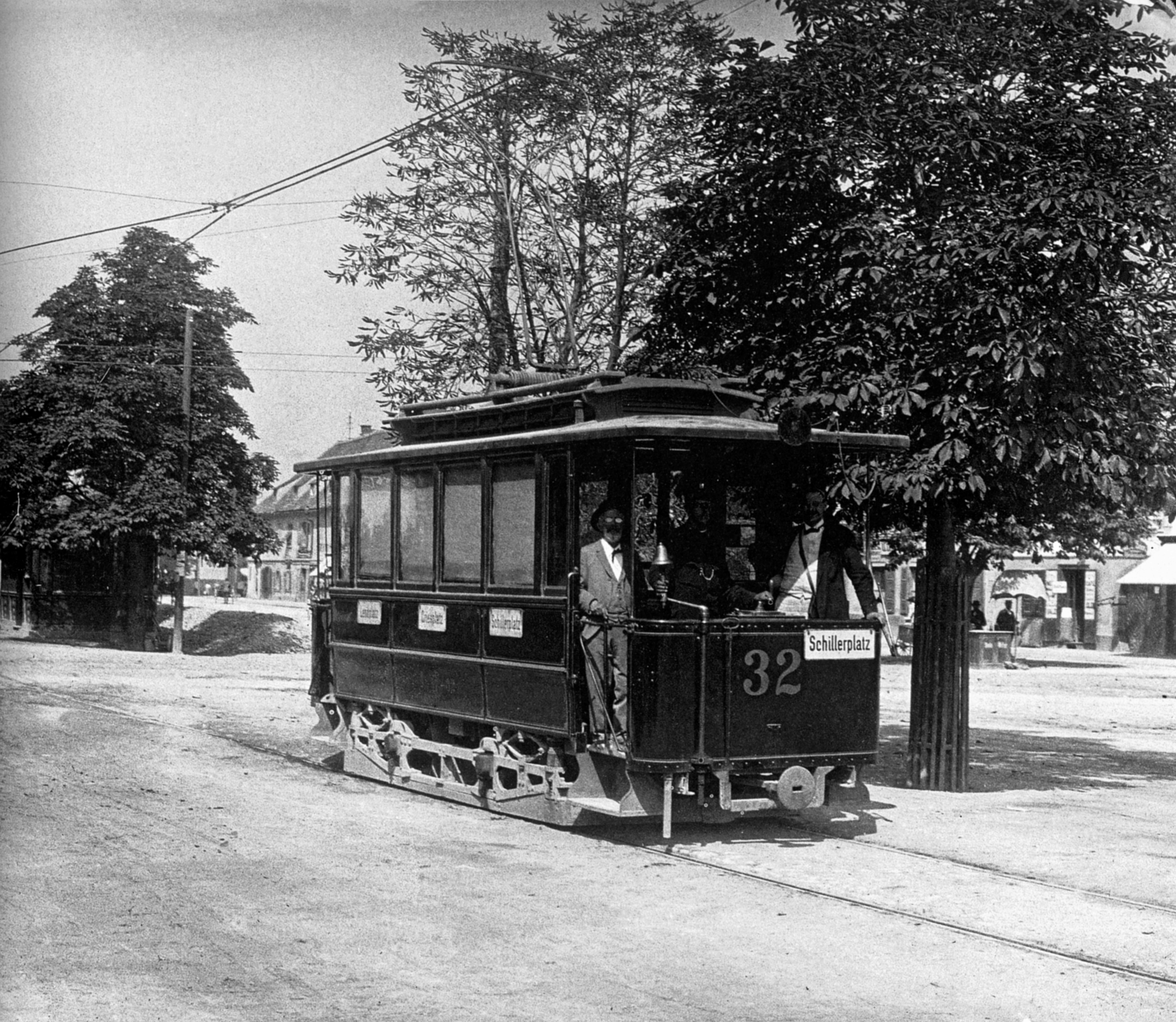
The first electric tram in 1899

The first trams to run in Graz were horse trams in private ownership, with service commencing in 1878. The lines were electrified from 1899. In 1939, the tram network was acquired by the city.

In 1941, the narrow gauge electric railway that had linked Graz with the suburb of Mariatrost since 1898, was converted to standard gauge and became part of the tram network. The resulting long outer section of tram route 1 still retains many light railway features, with its off-street routing and long stretches of single track.

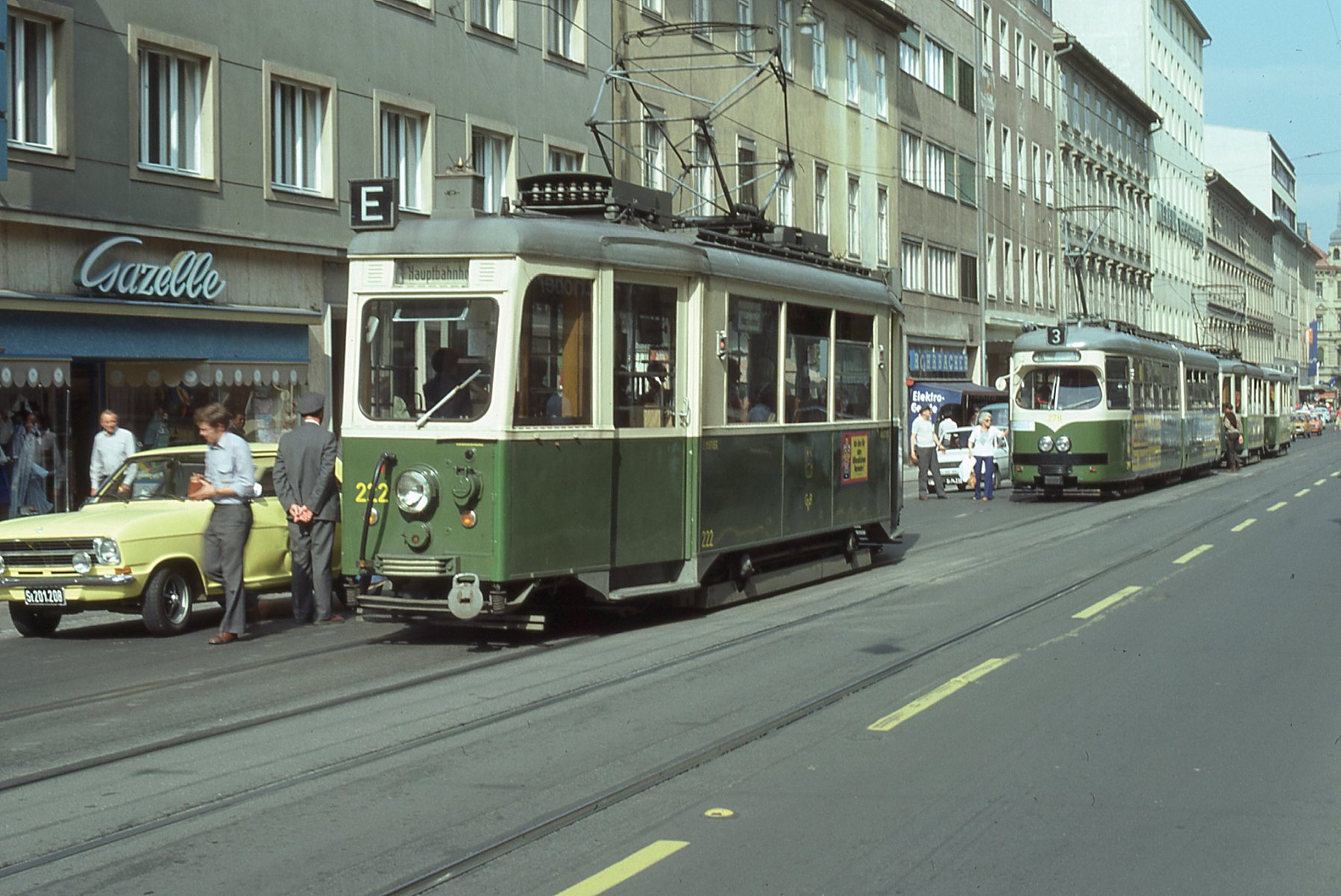
Graz trams in 1977

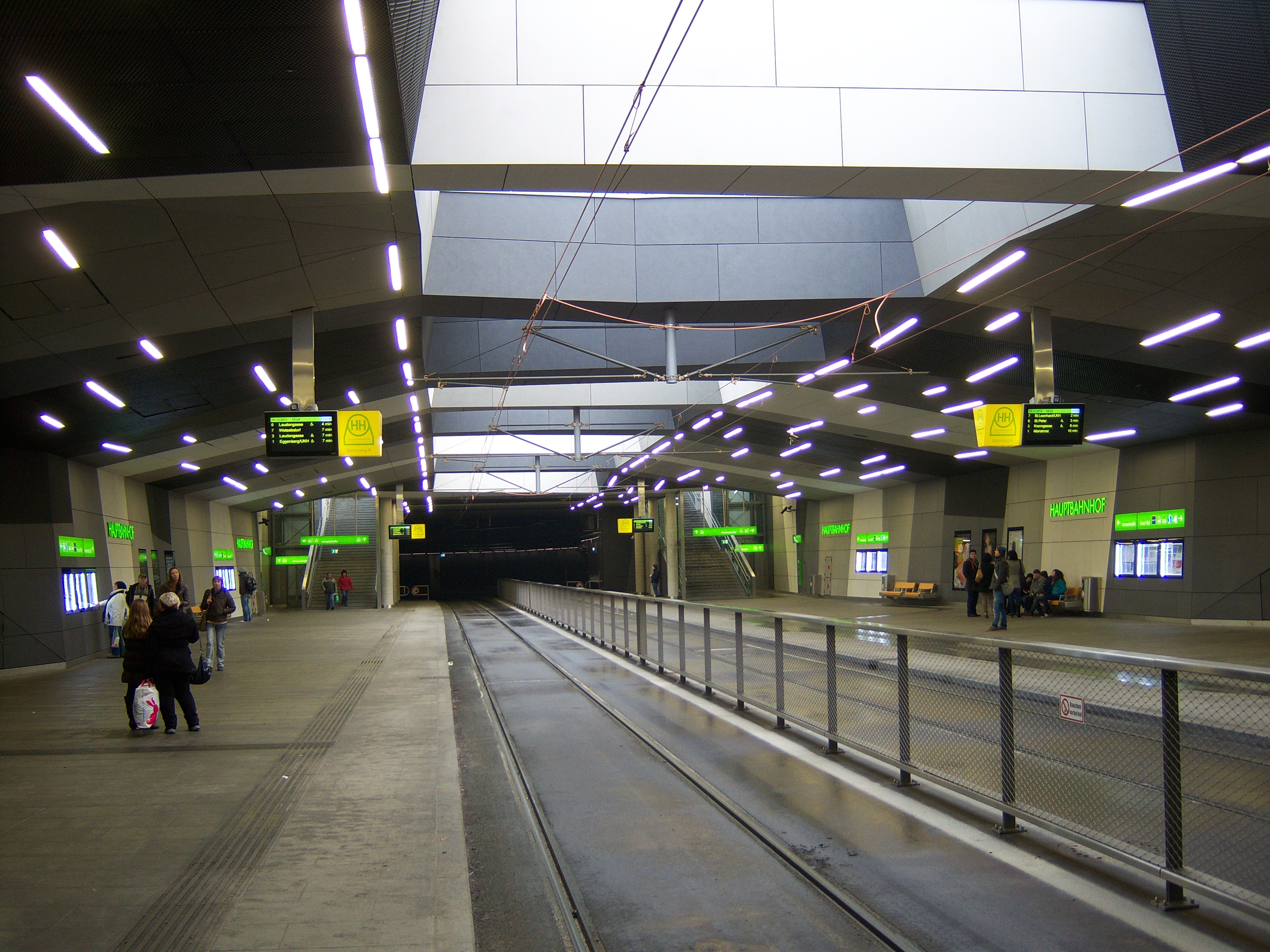
Subsurface tramstop at Graz main railway station from 2012

The Graz tram network reached a peak in 1950. Growing car ownership, and the growth of residential areas in outer reaches of the city not served by the trams, led to a fall in tram usage and eventually, after 1950, the closure of several tram routes. The city introduced trolleybuses in 1941 to serve the outer areas of the city, but these were replaced by motor buses by 1967.

In the 1990s, with the city's narrow central streets proving ill-suited to large quantities of private car traffic, the city adopted a policy of improving and expanding public transport, with modernisation and extension of the tramway. The area around Jakominiplatz was developed as the main tram and city bus interchange from 1995, whilst extensions to Puntigam, Liebenau/Murpark and St Peter followed in 2006 and 2007.

In 2001, Graz was the launch customer for the Bombardier Cityrunner with 18 27 m (89 ft) long five-section trams purchased. These were the city's first low-floor trams, although the concept was introduced in 1999 by the fitting of new low-floor centre sections to 12 existing trams.

In 2007, Graz ordered 45 Stadler Variobahn trams for delivery between 2009 and 2015. These vehicles proved controversial, with complaints over noise and vibration levels. Initially confined to the north–south axis lines 4 and 5, the trams started operating on the east–west axis in 2013, after modifications and imposition of a speed limit.

In 2012, new tram tunnels were built to serve the city's main railway station (Graz Hauptbahnhof), which was previously the terminus of two tram lines and some distance from the main westbound tram route. Trams on the main line now stop in a new subsurface tram station in the station forecourt area. This allows the station to be served by four of the city's six lines.

In 2016 a new extension of line 7 in order to serve the new medical campus of the University of Graz in Stiftingtalstraße was constructed and opened to the public on 11 September 2016. The line was extended by one stop from the previous terminus at St. Leonhard.

On 29 November 2025, the Neutorlinie line opened between Jakominiplatz and Annenstraße via Neutorgasse to relieve congestion along Herrengasse in the city centre. Line 17 would use the Neutorlinie with line 16 taking over on evenings, weekends and holidays.

== Operation ==
Historical Line 2 (Circle line) Hauptbahnhof - Hauptbahnhof

Overview
- Native name: Linie 2 (Ringlinie)
- Termini: Hauptbahnhof; Hauptbahnhof (until 1962) Keplerbrücke (until 1963) Wormgasse (until 1971)
- Stations: 17 (1899-1953); 18 (1954-62); 14 (1962-63); 12 (1963-71)
- Color on map: red (until March 25, 1911)

History
- Opened: August 21, 1888 as horse tramway July 24, 1899 as electric tramway
- Closed: December 31, 1953 connection Hbf; June 5, 1962 Keplerstraße; November 14, 1963 Wickenburgg. January 17, 1971 remaining parts

Technical
- Line length: 6.0 km (3.7 mi)

Line 1 Eggenberg/UKH - Mariatrost

Overview
- Native name: Linie 1
- Termini: Eggenberg/UKH; Mariatrost
- Stations: 32
- Color on map: light blue

History
- Current route since: September 10, 1990

Technical
- Line length: 11.2 km (7.0 mi)

Line 3/(23) Andritz - (Jakominiplatz) - Krenngasse

Overview
- Native name: Linie 3/(23)
- Termini: Andritz; Krenngasse
- Stations: 19/7
- Color on map: light green/purple

History
- Current route since: July 11, 2020

Technical
- Line length: 6.5 km (4.0 mi)

Line 4 Reininghaus - Liebenau/MURPARK

Overview
- Native name: Linie 4
- Termini: Reininghaus; Liebenau/MURPARK
- Stations: 24
- Color on map: light brown

History
- Current route since: November 26, 2021

Technical
- Line length: 8.5 km (5.3 mi)

Line 5 Andritz - Puntigam

Overview
- Native name: Linie 5
- Termini: Andritz; Puntigam
- Stations: 28
- Color on map: brown

History
- Current route since: December 1, 2006

Technical
- Line length: 9.8 km (6.1 mi)

Line 6/16 Smart City - St. Peter

Overview
- Native name: Linie 6/16
- Termini: Smart City/P.Tunner-Gasse/tim; St. Peter
- Stations: 23
- Color on map: green

History
- Current route since: November 26, 2021

Technical
- Line length: 8.2 km (5.1 mi)

Line 7/17 Wetzelsdorf - LKH Med Uni/Klinikum Nord

Overview
- Native name: Linie 7/17
- Termini: Wetzelsdorf; LKH Med Uni/Klinikum Nord
- Stations: 25
- Color on map: orange

History
- Current route since: September 10, 2016

Technical
- Line length: 7.7 km (4.8 mi)

=== Route network ===
The following services operate during the day on Mondays to Saturdays:

- Line 1: Eggenberg/UKH – Hauptbahnhof – Jakominiplatz – Mariatrost
- Line 3: Andritz – Jakominiplatz – Krenngasse
- Line 4: Reininghaus – Hauptbahnhof – Jakominiplatz – Liebenau/Murpark
- Line 5: Andritz – Jakominiplatz – Puntigam
- Line 6: Smart City – Hauptbahnhof – Jakominiplatz – St. Peter
- Line 7: Wetzelsdorf – Hauptbahnhof – Jakominiplatz – LKH Med Uni/Klinikum Nord

The following services operate in the evenings and on Sundays:

- Lines 1, 4, 5, 6 and 7: as above
- Line 23: Krenngasse – Jakominiplatz

=== Infrastructure ===
Graz's tram network is built to standard gauge and is electrified using overhead line at 600 V DC. The network is largely double track, with some 3.5 kilometres (2.2 mi) of single track on the northern, former light railway, section of line 1, and just over 1 kilometre (0.62 mi) towards the southern terminus of line 5 (construction work to expand line 5 to double tracks will finish in November 2024). Most of the track is at grade, with the exception of the subsurface tram stop, with linking tunnels, at the main railway station, and a short tunnel just before the southern terminus of line 5.

With the exception of the short tunnelled sections, and the former light railway section of line 1, all of the system is street based, with varying degrees of segregation. As the trams are single-ended, with doors on only one side, all terminal locations are equipped with turning loops, and all tram stops are to the nearside of the tram.

=== Tram fleet ===
As of 2026, the Graz tramway network's fleet was:

Nos.	Image	Manufacturer	Built	Length(mm)	Axles	Wheelbase(mm)	Seated/Standing	Notes
501–510 (10)		SGP Graz	1978	25,343	8	6,000	40/94	
601–612 (12)		SGP Graz	1986–1987	27,000	8	6,000	41/126	Low-floor middle segment installed 1999.
651–668 (18)		Bombardier Transportation	2000–2001	27,000	6	6,000	54/90	To Bombardier's standard, 100% low-floor, Cityrunner design.
201–245 (45)		Stadler Rail	2009–2015	27,000	6	6,000	54/90	To Stadler Rail's standard, 100% low-floor, Variobahn design.
(31)		Alstom	2025–	33.810	6		140/60	Alstom Flexity, service starting 2026, 100% low-floor

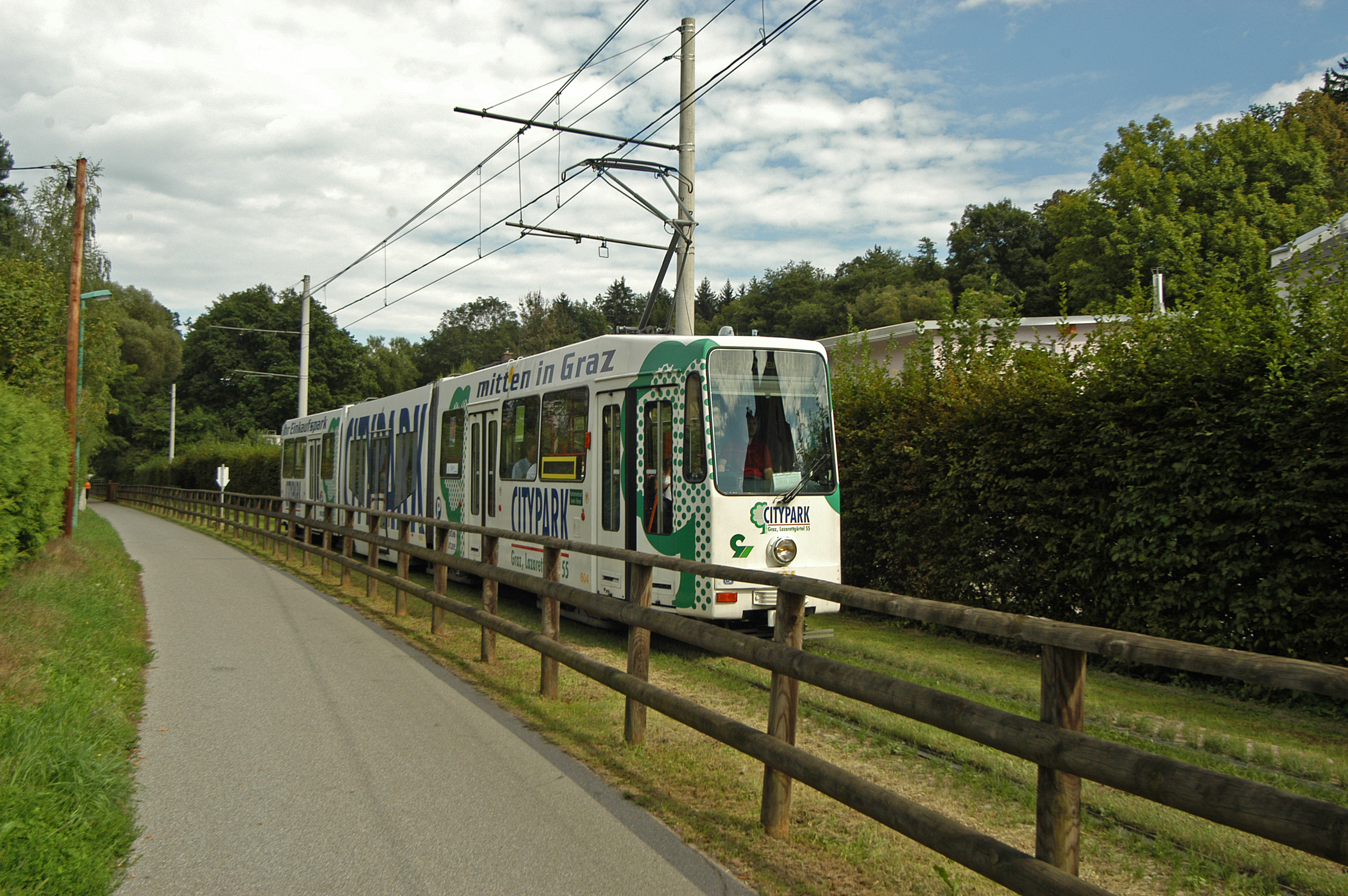
Tram on the former light railway section of line 1

=== Tickets and fares ===
The Graz tramway network is entirely within zone 101 of the Verbund Linie, an integrated tariff for public transport throughout Styria. Zone 101 tickets are valid on all trams, and all city buses with single or double digit route numbers. They are also valid on regional buses, which have three digit route numbers, and trains, but only within the boundary of the zone.

Tickets are available for different periods of validity, including one hour, 24 hours, a week, a month or a year, and allow unlimited changes of vehicle within the validity period. Tickets can be purchased from ticket machines on board the trams or at the major stops, from tobacconists, or from a central office. They are also available by SMS text message or via a smartphone app.

Aimed at visitors to the city, there is also a three-day ticket which allows unlimited travel within the city for three days, as well as giving reduced admission charges at selected attractions. The ticket is available at hotels and other accommodation, at the city tourist information office, at ticket sale counters at the Schloßbergbahn funicular, and at Graz Airport.

== Future ==
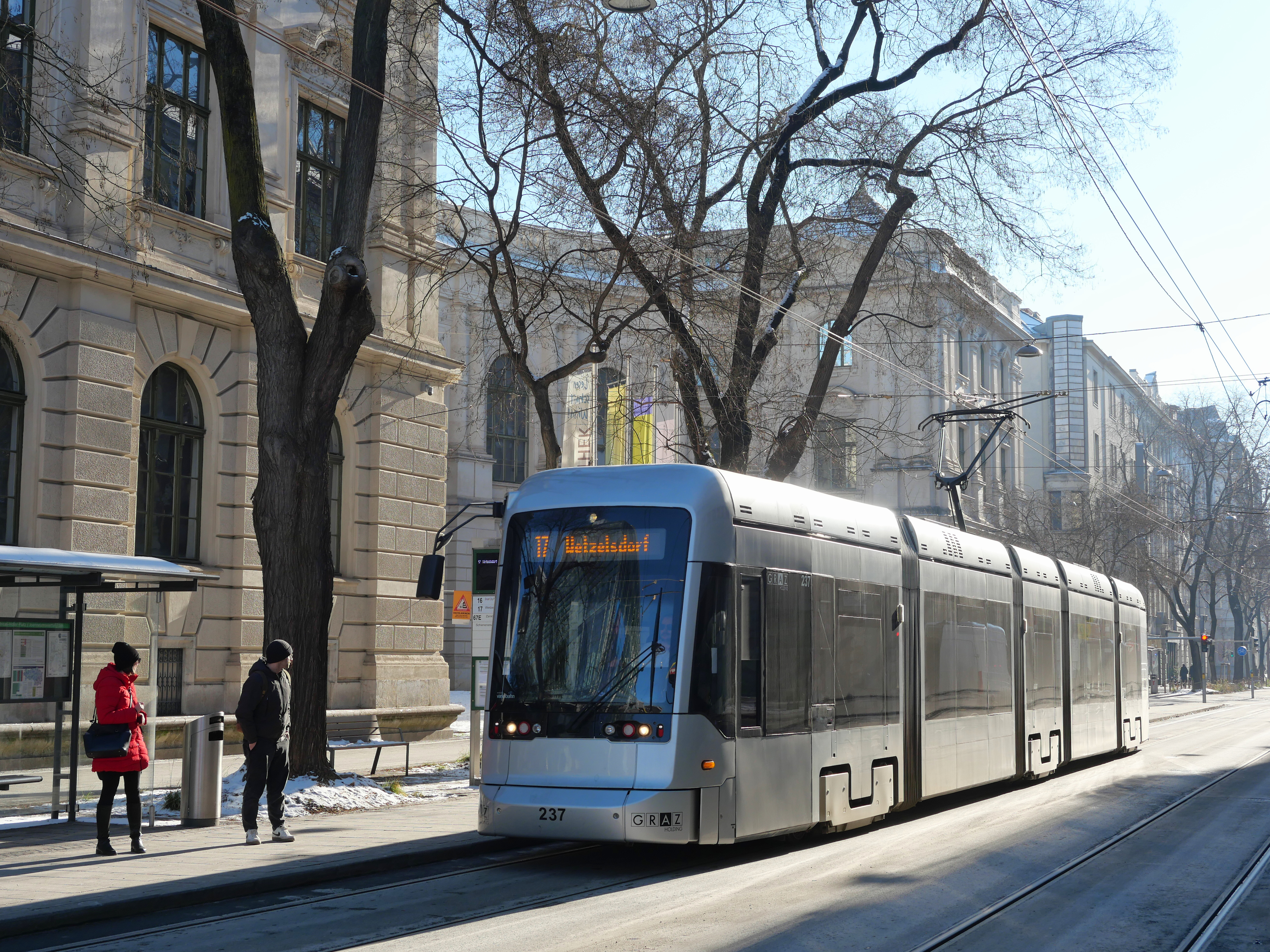
Variobahn on the route through Neutorgasse, opened in 2025

With the introduction of the full set of Variobahn trams, many of Graz's older high-floor trams will be retired. It is also planned to lengthen the new Variobahn trams by adding 2 further sections to the trams.

There are plans for a number of extensions to existing lines plus the building of 1 new line.

On February 5, 2018, the co-financing of a comprehensive expansion program was signed between the city of Graz and, for the first time, the province of Styria. By 2023, 117 million euros are to be allocated for the construction or expansion of six routes. Co-financing from the federal government is being sought.

- Downtown relief route via Belgiergasse, Vorbeckgasse to Annenstraße (approximately 1 km, 27 million euros, 2022–2025).
- Double-track expansion of Line 5 from the Central Cemetery to Brauquartier Puntigam (15.3 million euros, October 2022 – November 2024).
- Double-track expansion of Line 1 from Hilmteich to Mariagrün (6.3 million euros, by 2023).
- Partial double-track expansion of Line 1 between Mariagrün and Mariatrost (in several construction phases, 2.3 million euros, by 2023).

Line 8 is in a planned 12.6 km connection between Gösting and Straßgang, of which 11 km will be new track. The line would be built in multiple stages. A north-west section (NW1) will be built between Roseggerhaus and Fröbelpark. A south-west section (SW2) will be built between Karlauer Gürtel and Reininghaus via Citypark and Don Bosco with some portions of the line in mixed traffic. Planning is to continue until 2028, construction would start in 2030 and the new line would go into service in 2033. In 2025, construction costs were estimated at €72 million for NW1 and €93.5 million for SW2.

- Line 8: Gösting – Citypark – Don Bosco – Reininghaus – Straßgang

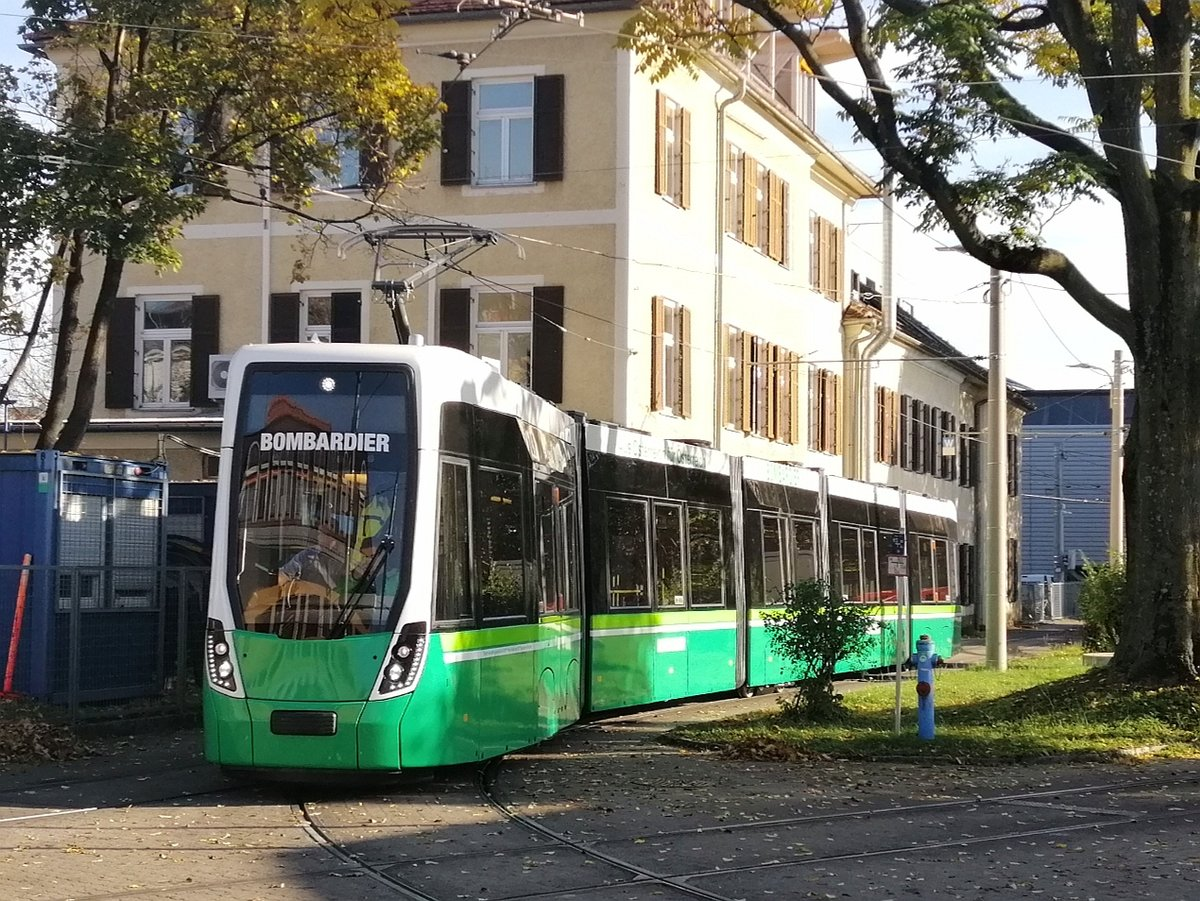
Flexity test run in Graz (2019)

== See also ==
- List of town tramway systems
