= Tramway Museum Graz =

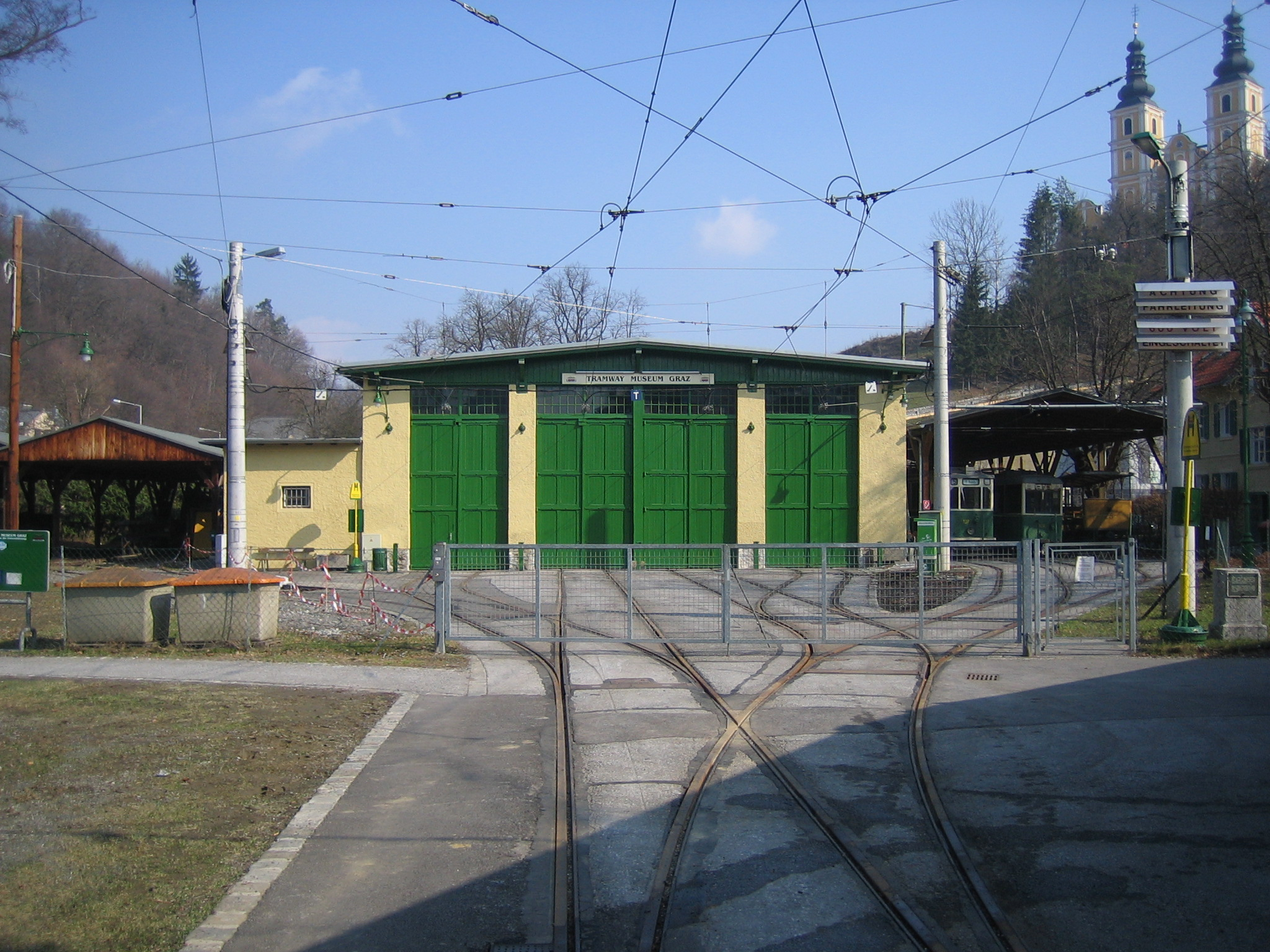
- The frontage of the museum, with the Mariatrost Basilica at top right.
- Location: Mariatrost; Graz; Austria
- Coordinates: 47.10561°N 15.488931°E
- Type: Transport museum
- Public transit access: Graz tram route 1

The Tramway Museum Graz is a transport museum in the Austrian city of Graz, specialising in the history of the Graz tramway network. It is located in the former tram depot at the Mariatrost terminus of Graz tram route 1.

The museum houses a collection of some 30 rail vehicles, including motor trams, trailers, works cars, horse cars and funicular cars. While most vehicles are from Graz, there are also exhibits from Vienna, Innsbruck, Dubrovnik and New York.

The building housing the museum was originally the depot of the Kleinbahn Graz–Mariatrost, a metre gauge electric railway that was subsequently regauged to standard gauge and incorporated into the Graz tramway system. It is near to the Mariatrost Basilica, a much visited pilgrimage church.

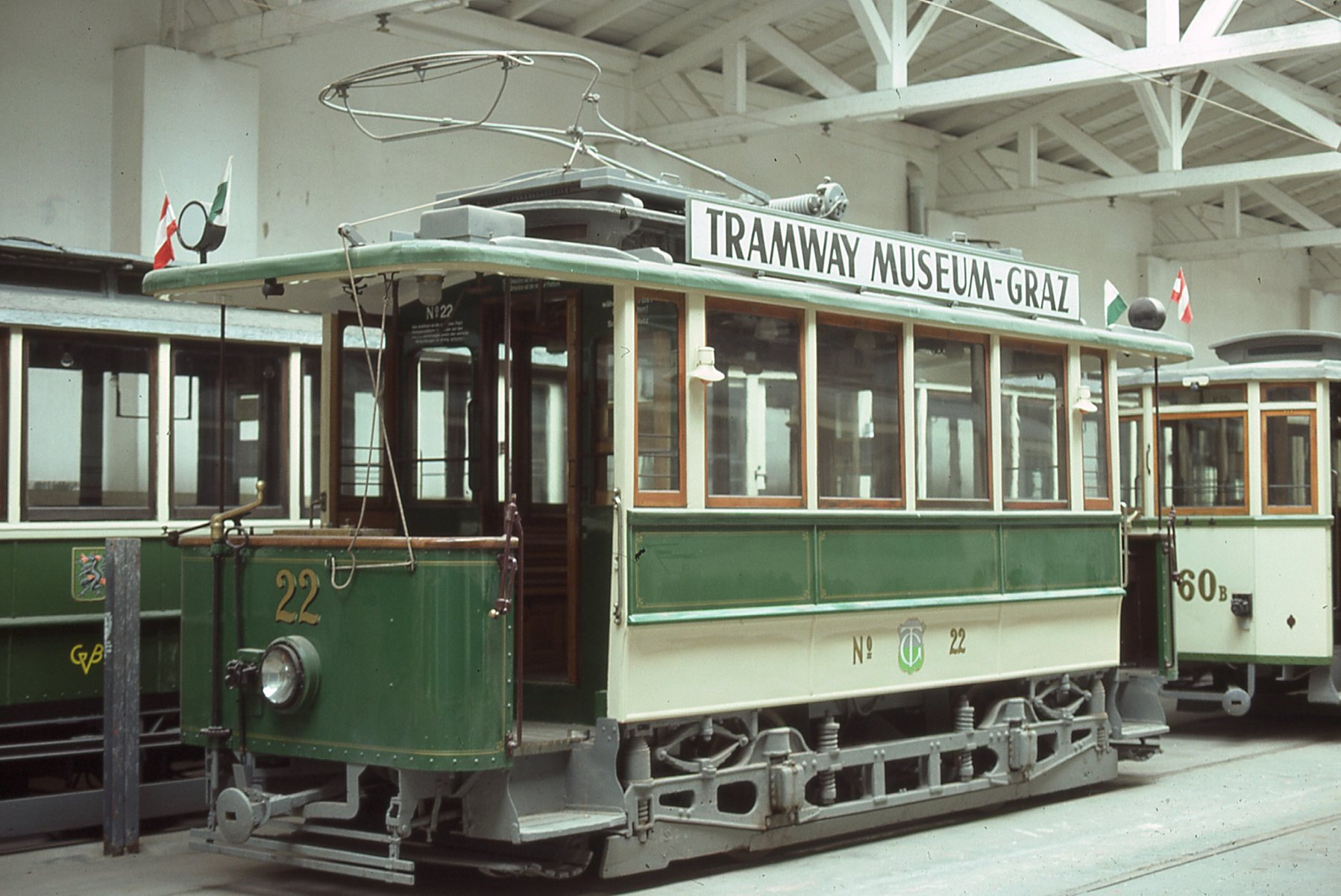
Interior of the museum

The museum is only open on occasional open days, of which there were four in 2013, or by appointment.

In 2021, the vehicle exhibition was complemented by a photo exhibition, showcasing the activities of the association over the past 50 years.
