= Wetzelsdorf =

Coordinates: 47°03′24″N 15°23′43″E

- 15th city district of Graz
- Interactive map of Wetzelsdorf
- Country: Austria
- Province: Styria
- Statutory city: Graz

Area
  - Total: 5.77 km^{2} (2.23 sq mi)

Population (2010)
  - Total: 14,100
  - Density: 2,440/km^{2} (6,330/sq mi)

Wetzelsdorf (German: [ˈvεt͡sl̩sˌdɔɐ̯f]) is the 15th city district of Graz, Austria. It is located in the west part of the city between the districts of Eggenberg to the north and Straßgang to the south. About 14,100 people live there in an area of 5.77 km^{2}.

The district which originally belonged to Eggenberg developed along the Austrian Southern Railway and the Alten Poststraße as a commercial area with working class quarters. After the so-called "Anschluß" in 1938 Wetzelsdorf became part of the city of Graz, as other surrounding areas of the city did as well.

There are a number of institutions in the district for example the provincial police center of Styria, a provincial school for gardeners, several churches, several military facilities and a Jewish cemetery.

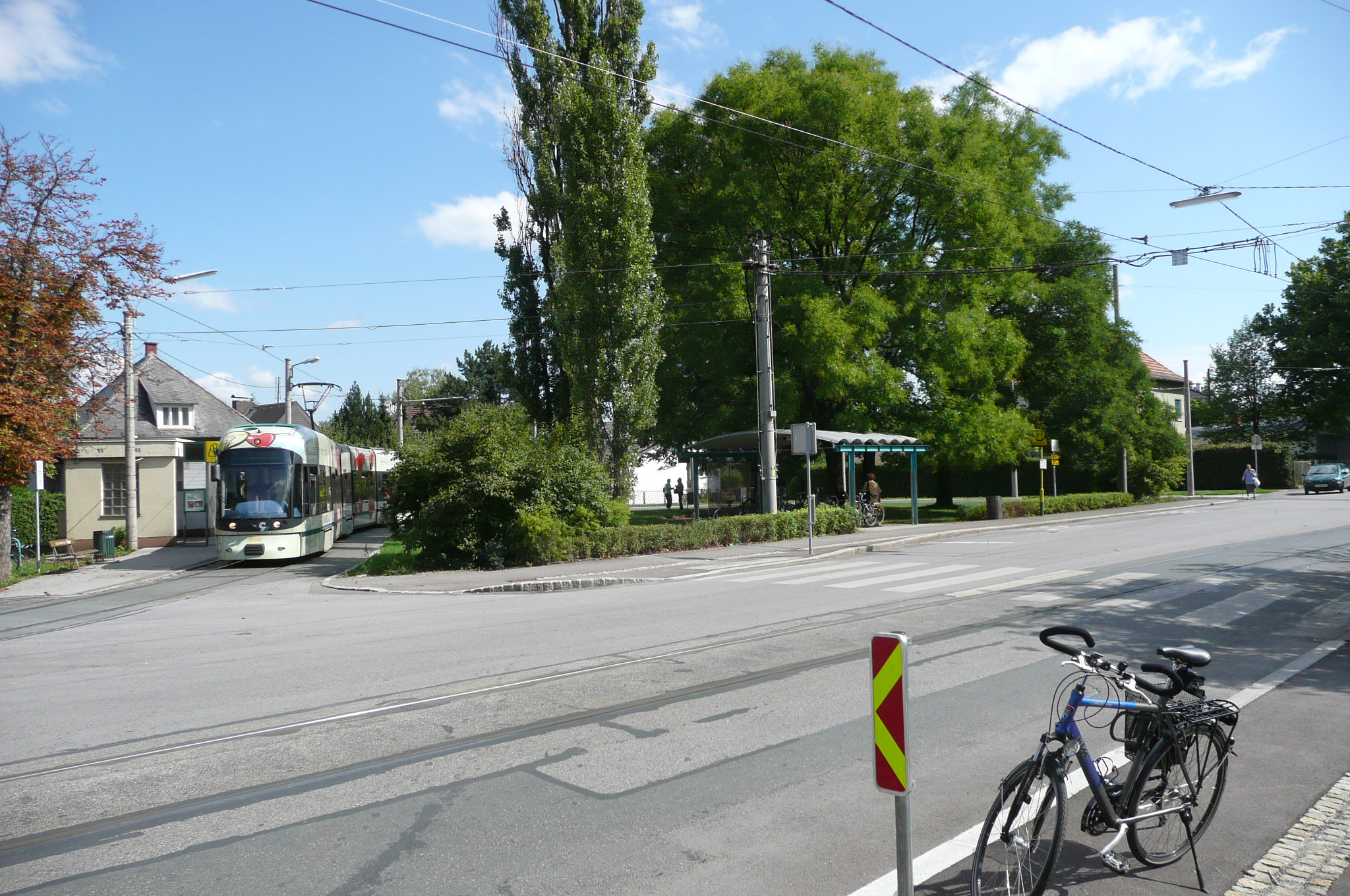
The Wetzelsdorf station of the number 7 tramway line.

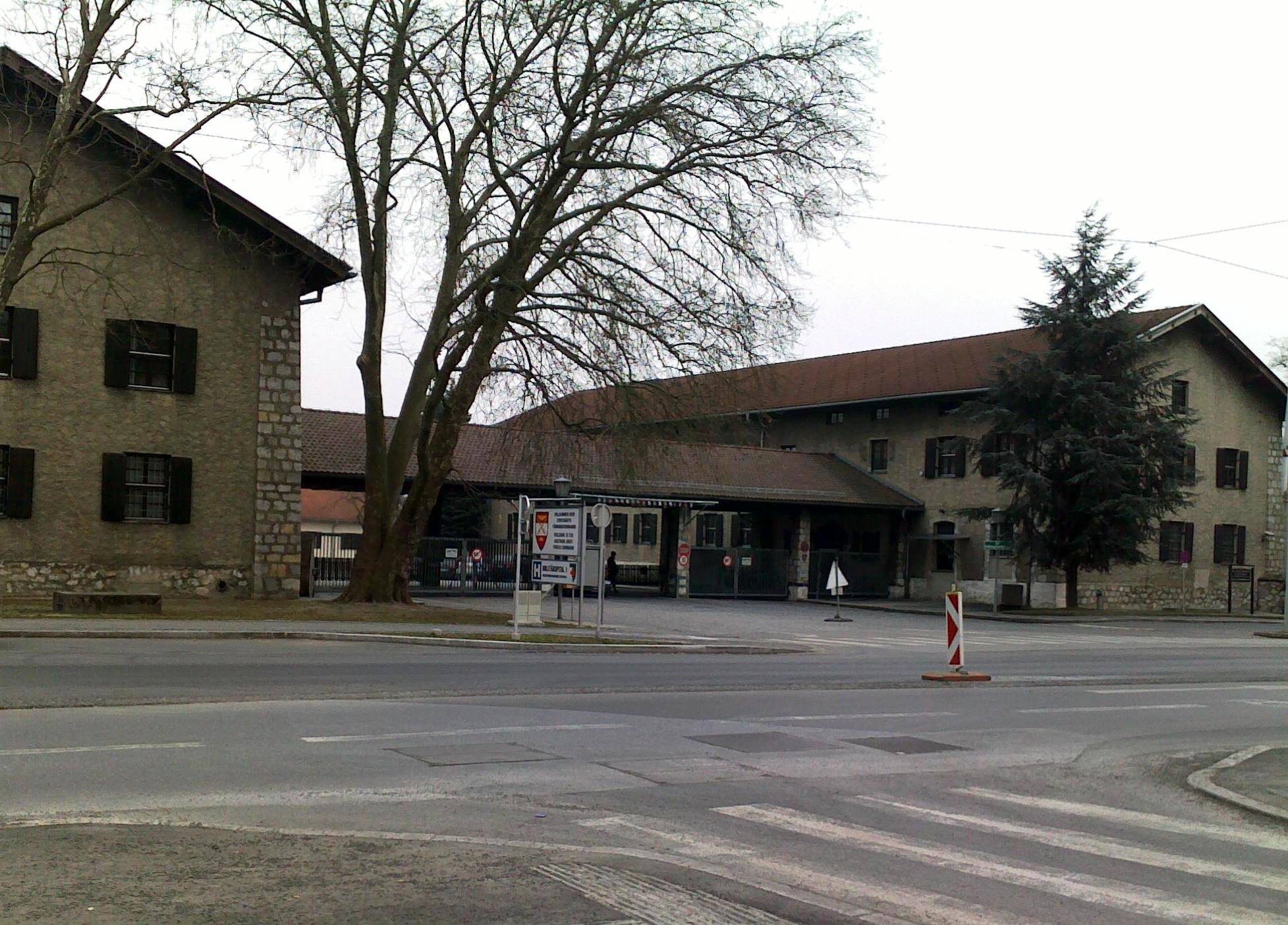
Entrance of the barracks building Belgierkaserne.

Concerning the traffic connections there is the Wetzelsdorf station of the Graz-Köflacher railway, the city bus lines 31, 33, 62 and 64, and the tram line 7, which ends at the northern border of the district.

Directly on the western district border the 555 m high 'Ölberg' hill is situated in a forest area. Below this hill the Pyhrn motorway (A 9) runs along in the Plabutsch tunnel.
