= Mariatrost Basilica =

Coordinates: 47°06′26″N 15°29′29″E

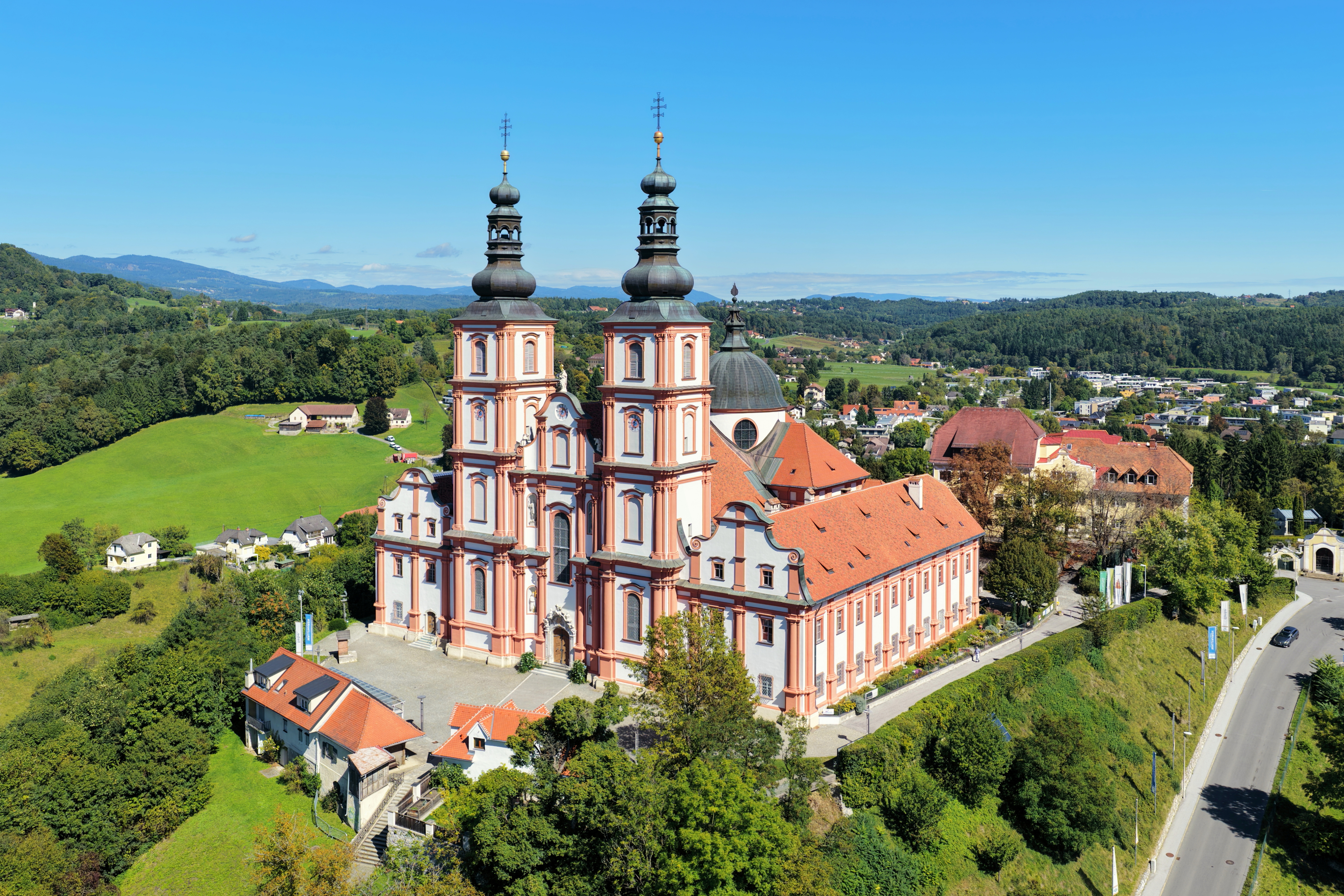

- Location within Austria
- Location: Graz, Styria
- Country: Austria
- Denomination: Roman Catholic

Architecture
- Architect: Andreas Stengg; Johann Georg Stengg
- Style: Baroque
- Years built: 1714–1724

The Baroque Mariatrost Basilica on top of the Purberg hill in Mariatrost, a district of Graz, is one of the most famous pilgrimage sites of Styria in Austria.

The pilgrimage church stands prominently on top of the Purberg hill (469 m) in the northeast of Graz. It can be reached using the 200 or more steps of the Angelus stair. The basilica is classified as a Baroque building. Two front towers (61 m) and a dome, visible from a great distance, are the characteristic attributes of the church, which is enclosed by two projecting wings of a former monastery once occupied by the Pauline Fathers (1708–86) and later by the Franciscans (1842–1996).

The building was begun in 1714 by Andreas Stengg and his son Johann Georg Stengg and finished in 1724. The pulpit by Veit Königer (1730/31) is the masterpiece of the furnishings. The frescoes on the ceiling by Lukas von Schram and Johann Baptist Scheidt are of particular importance.

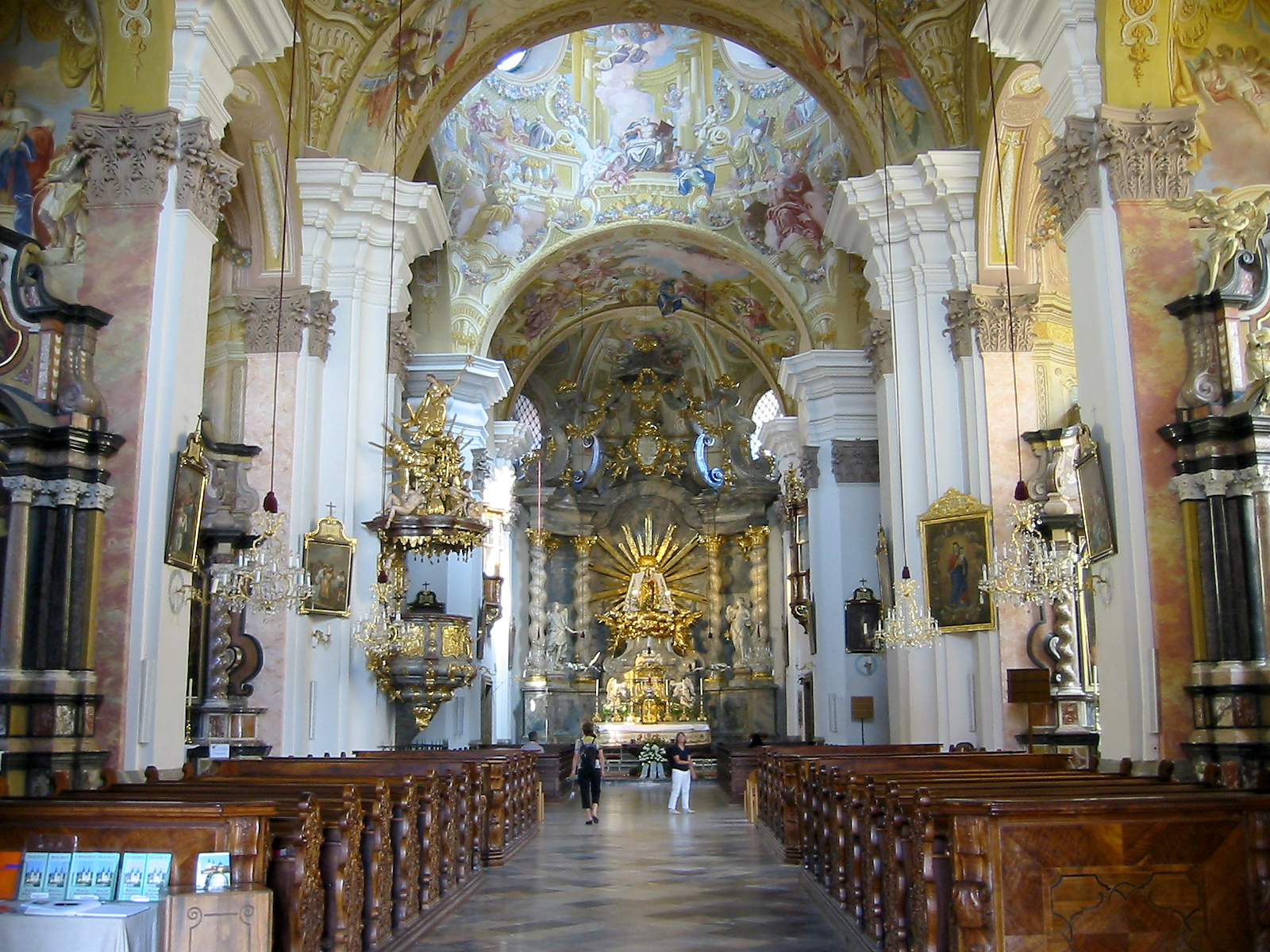
Interior view

The main altar includes a statue of the Madonna originally created in the Gothic period around 1465, but altered to the Baroque style in 1695 by Bernhard Echter.

Father David Bauer, a Canadian ice hockey coach and Basilian priest, attracted a following while coaching in Austria and conducted mass on several occasions at the basilica.

On 28 October 1999 the church was nominated as a basilica minor.

The Mariatrost Basilica is the second most important Marian shrine of Styria after Mariazell Basilica.
