= Schlossbergbahn (Graz) =

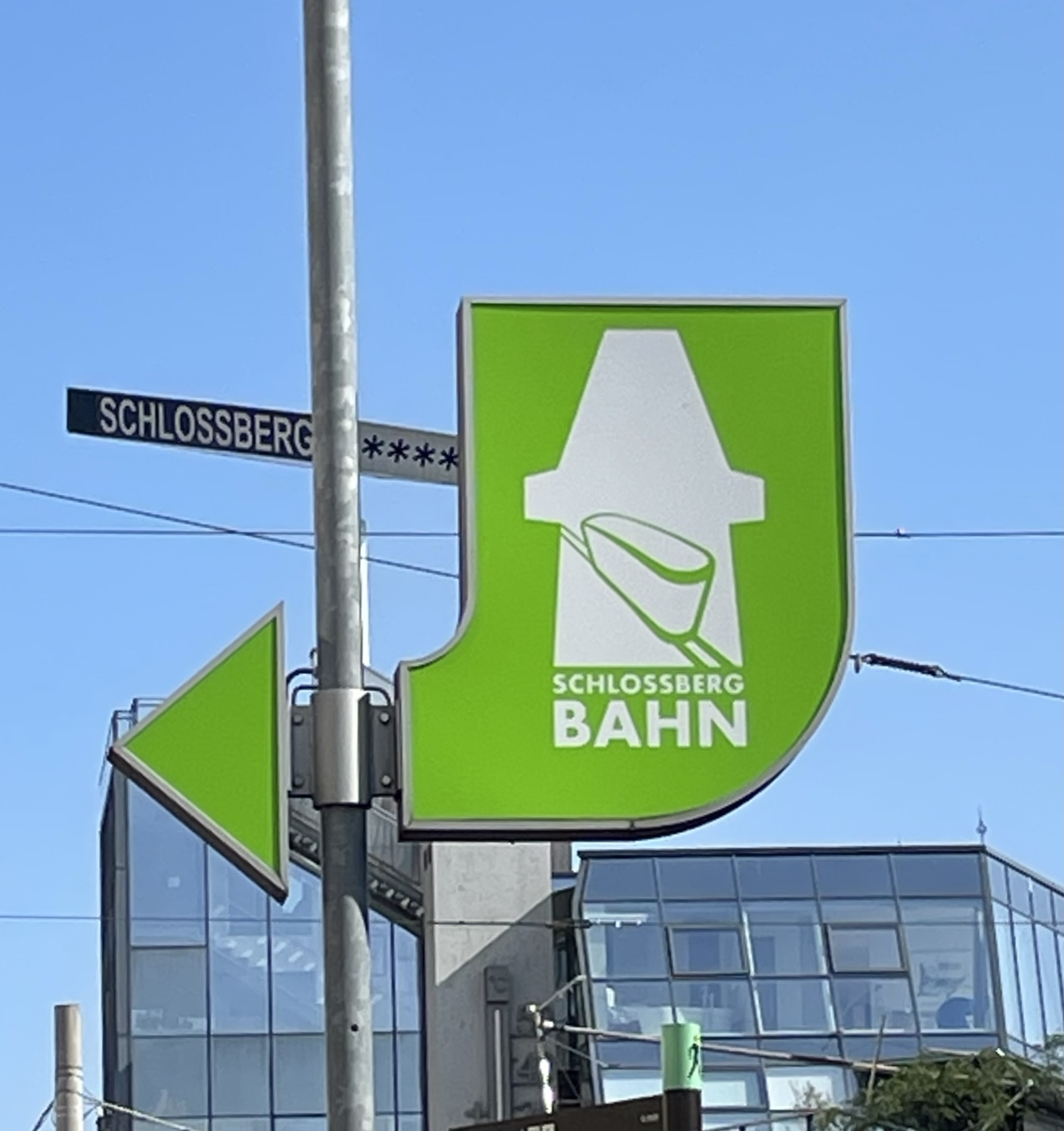

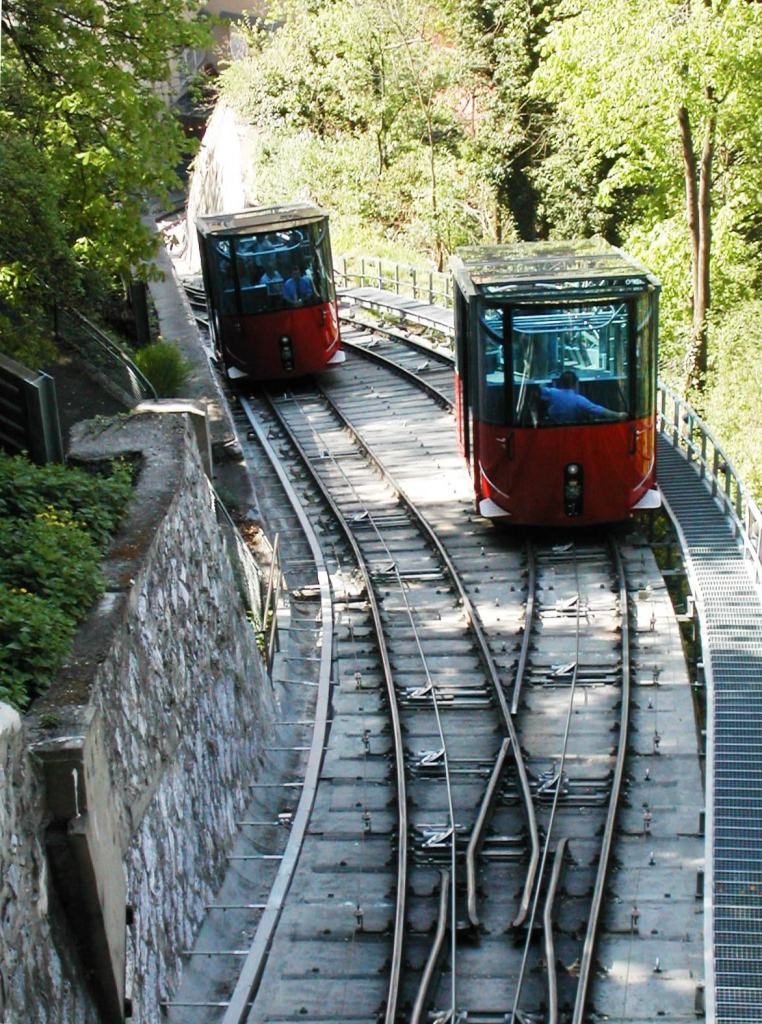
- The latest cars at the passing loop

Overview
- Status: active
- Owner: Holding Graz
- Locale: Graz, capital of Styria
- Coordinates: 47.0754°N 15.4356°E
- Termini: Schloßbergbahn; Schloßbergrestaurant
- Stations: 2

Service
- Type: Funicular
- Operator(s): Holding Graz
- Rolling stock: 2 cars

History
- Commenced: August 1893
- Opened: November 25, 1894
- Completed: October 1894

Technical
- Line length: 201 metres (659 ft)
- Number of tracks: One two-rail layout track with Abt passing loop
- Track gauge: 1,000 mm (3 ft 3 3/8 in)
- Electrification: 600 V =
- Operating speed: 11 km/h (6.8 mph)
- Highest elevation: 467 m (1,532 ft)
- Maximum incline: 599 ‰

The Schlossbergbahn, or Schloßbergbahn (English: Castle Hill Railway), is a funicular railway in the Austrian city of Graz. It connects the city centre with the Schloßberg, a hill and the site of a demolished fortress, with extensive views over the city.

The Schlossbergbahn should not be confused with the Schlossberg lift, a vertical lift which links the Schloßberg with the tunnel system beneath the hill, and via that with the city centre.

== History ==
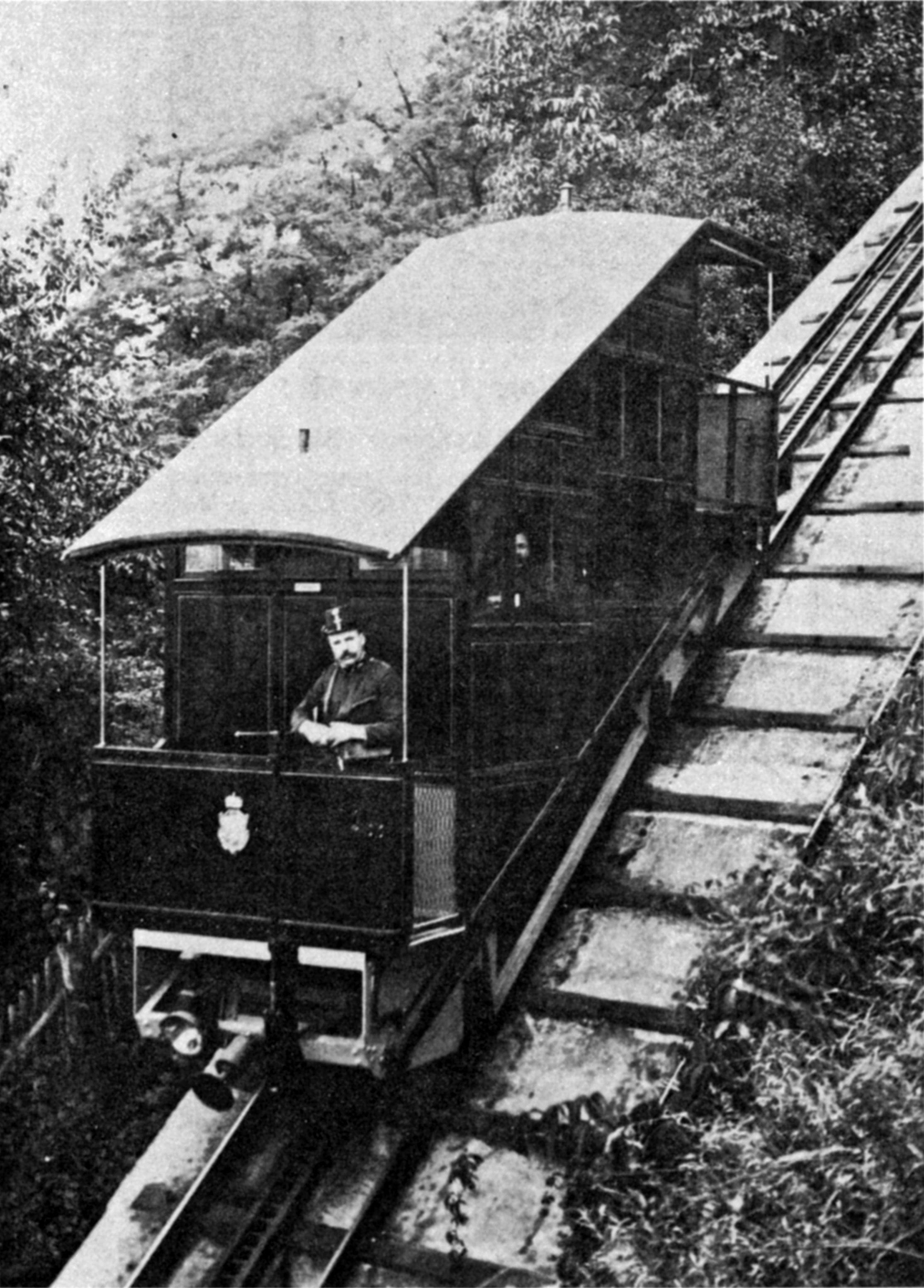
Original car No 1 (around 1900)

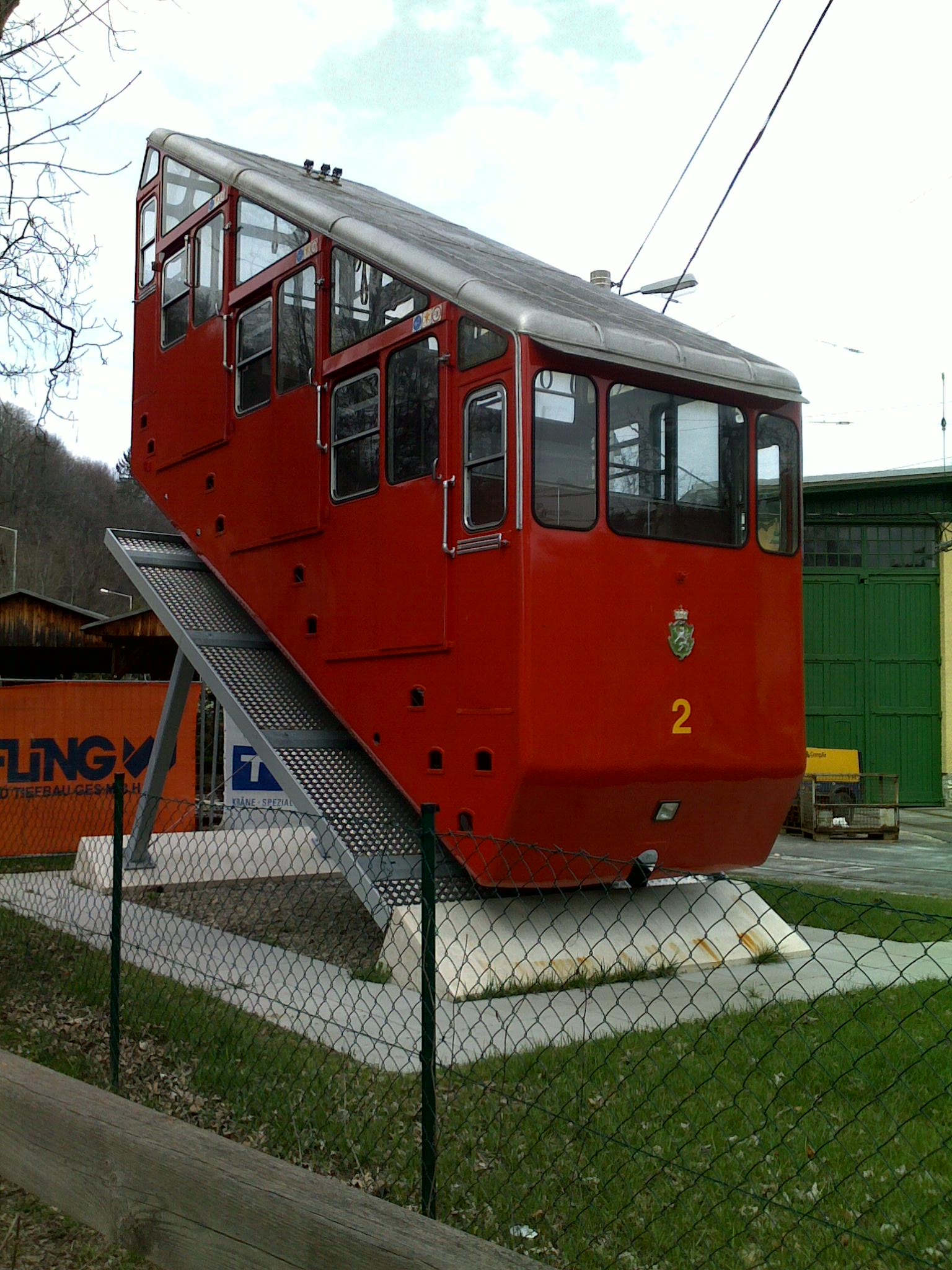
Second generation car at Graz Tramway Museum

The current Schlossbergbahn was not the first line on the Schloßberg, with records of a line being in use between 1528 and 1595 to move construction materials for the fortifications. After the military left the Schloßberg in 1856, discussions started on ways to make it more accessible, and in 1893 construction started on the current line.

In 1894 the line opened, using a steam engine to haul the cable and with a Riggenbach rack rail for braking. The haulage system was unusual in that whilst the 40 horsepower (30 kW) steam engine was at the upper station, the boiler was at the lower station, with the two linked by steam pipes.

The line was converted to electric haulage over the winter of 1899/1900, using current supplied by the Graz tramway system and to a design modeled on the San Salvatore funicular in Lugano, Switzerland. At around the same time, the line was transferred from private ownership to the ownership of the city of Graz.

In 1960/1961, the line was modernised and both stations were completely rebuilt. The cars were replaced, with the original cars going to the Graz Tramway Museum and the Vienna Technical Museum.

In 2000, the Schlossberg lift was constructed to provide an alternative route between city and summit in time for the city's spell as Cultural Capital of Europe in 2003. In 2004, the Schlossbergbahn was again modernised, with both cars being replaced and both stations reconstructed, at a cost of €2.5 million. The new cars were designed in cooperation with the Fachhochschule für Industrial Design, and have glass roofs, to allow passengers to see the view over the city.

== Operation ==
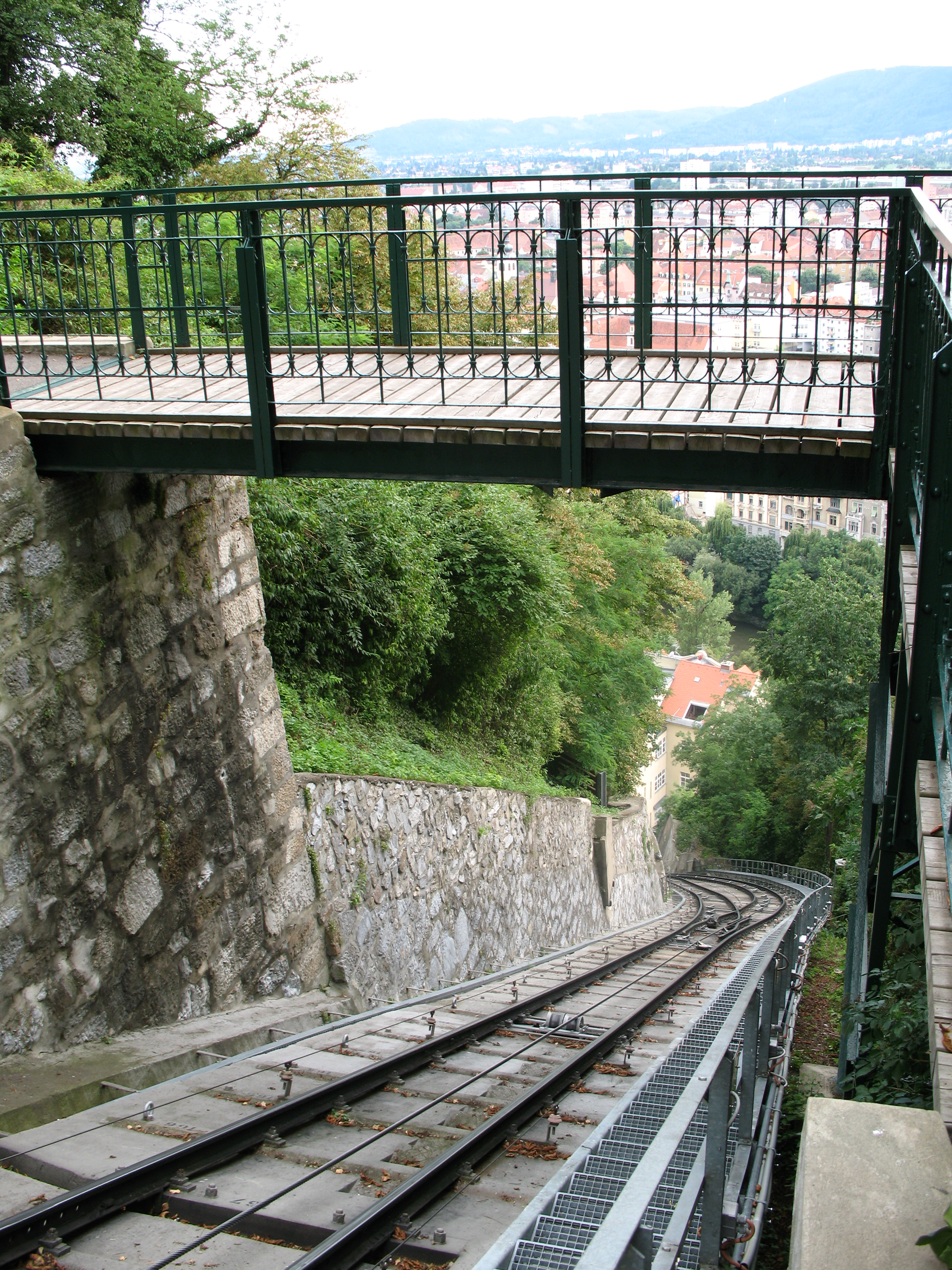
View down the line

The line is operated by Holding Graz, who also operate the city's tram network. It operates between 09:00 and midnight seven days a week, with extended operation until 02:00 the following day on Thursdays to Saturdays.

The line's lower station is served by the Schloßbergbahn stop, on routes 3 and 5 of the city's tram network. It is some 500 m (1,600 ft) north of the city's Hauptplatz.

The line has the following technical parameters:

Number of stops	2
Configuration	Single track with passing loop
Mode of operation	One driver per car
Track length	201 metres (659 ft)
Rise	108 metres (354 ft)
Maximum gradient	60%
Number of cars	2
Maximum speed	3 metres per second (9.8 ft/s)
Average travel time	3 minutes
Capacity	58 passengers per car
Traction	Electricity

== See also ==
- List of funicular railways

== Photo gallery ==
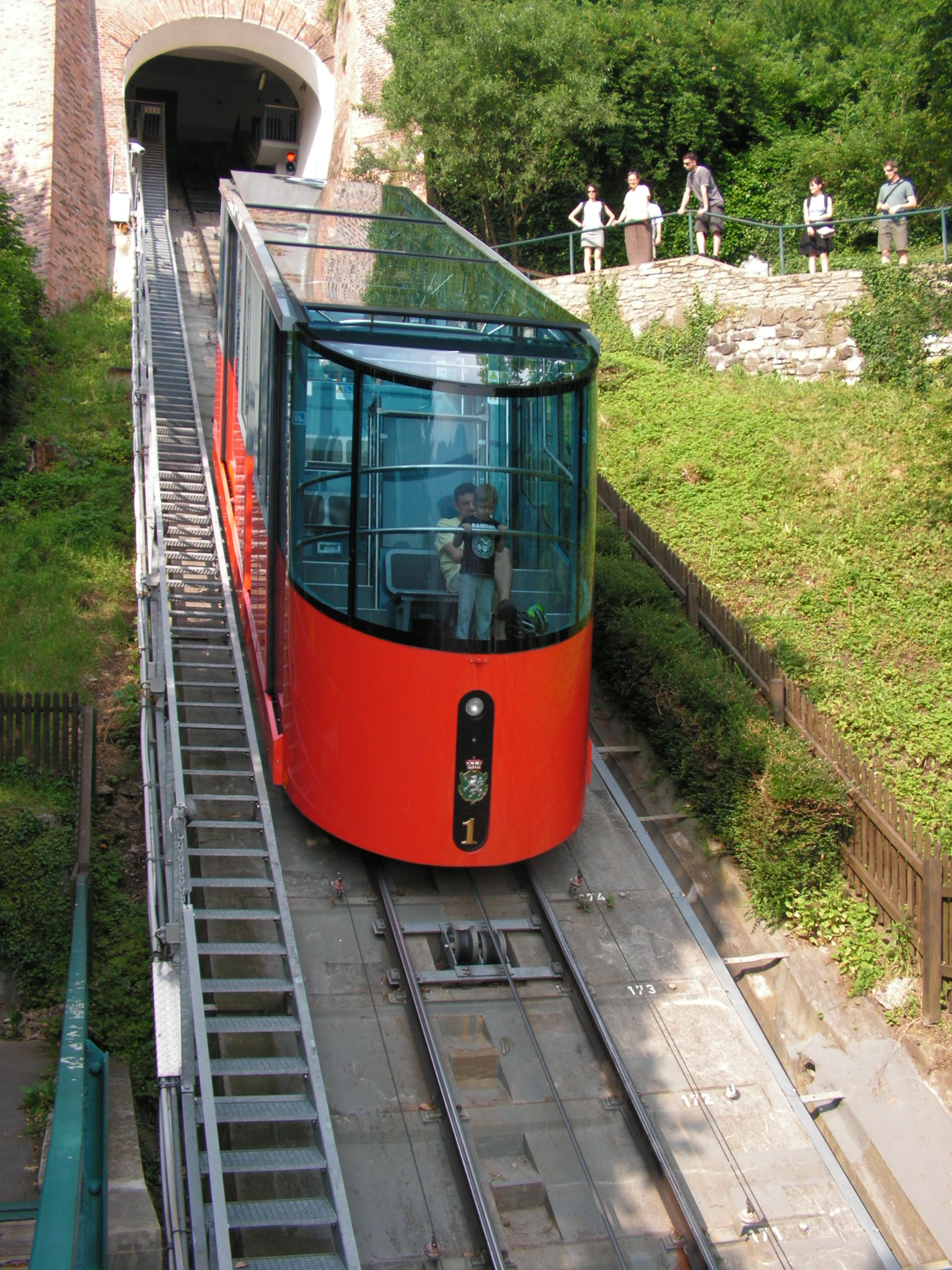

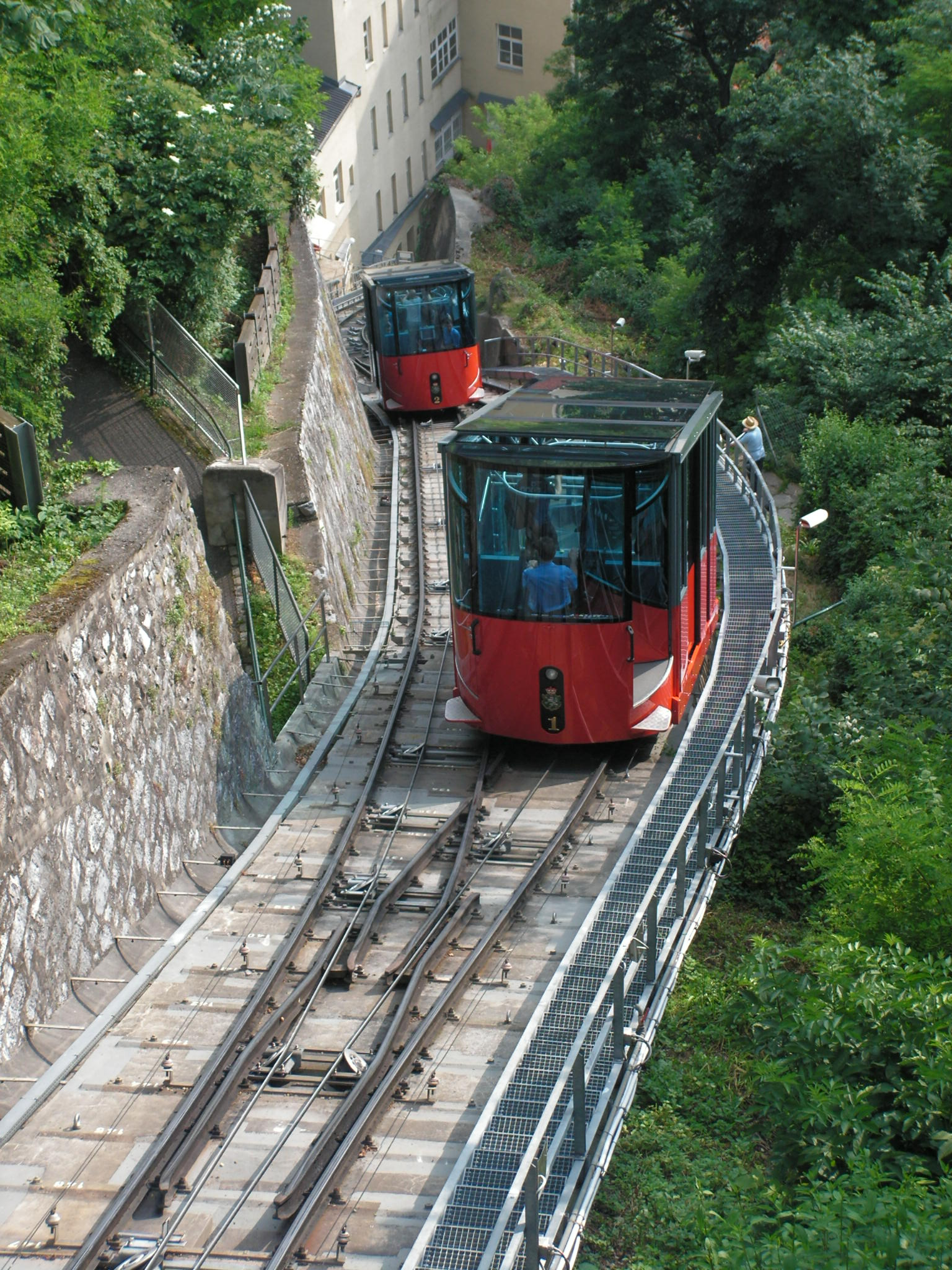

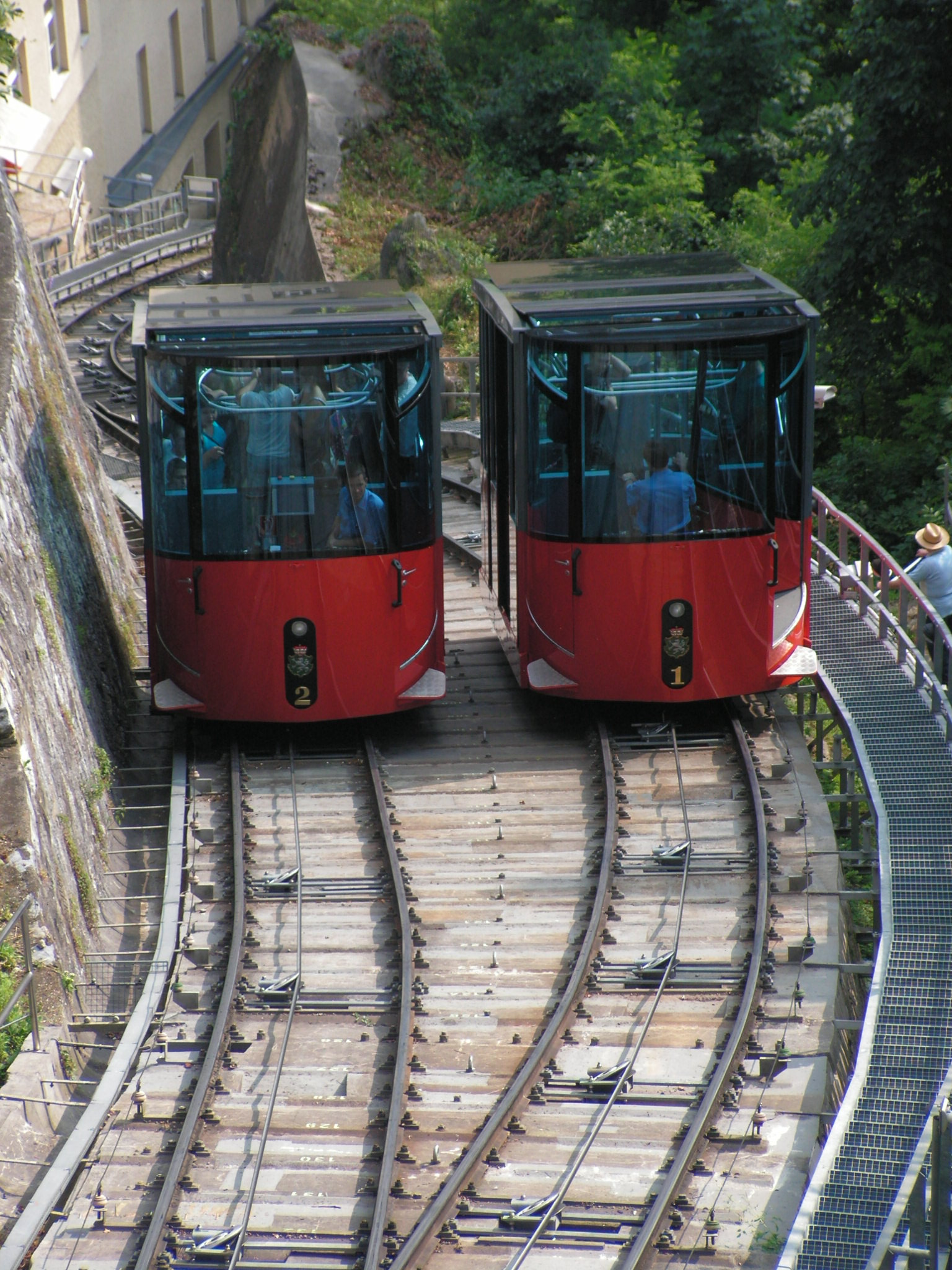

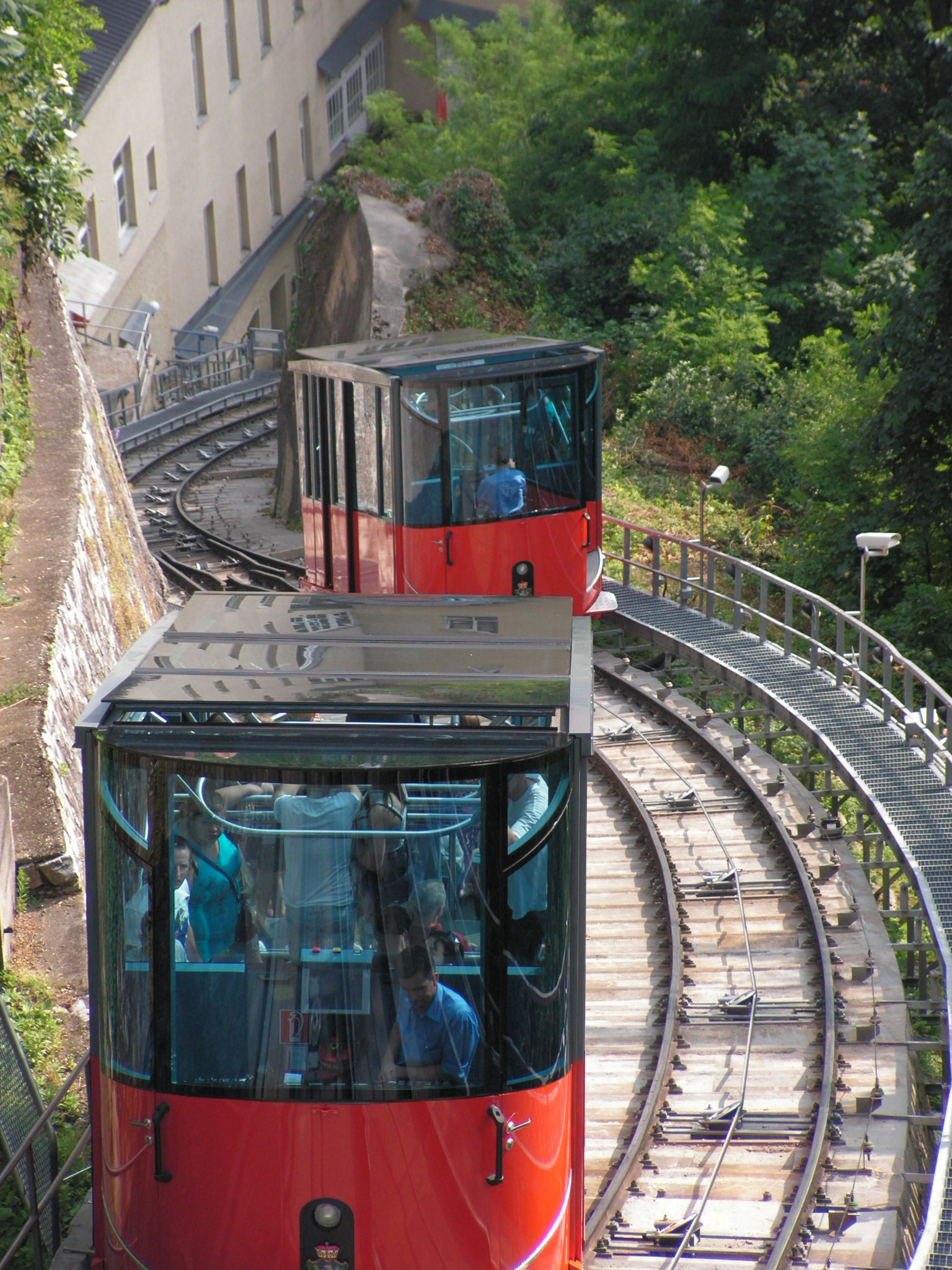
