= Mariatrost =

Coordinates: 47°06′N 15°30′E

- 11th city district of Graz
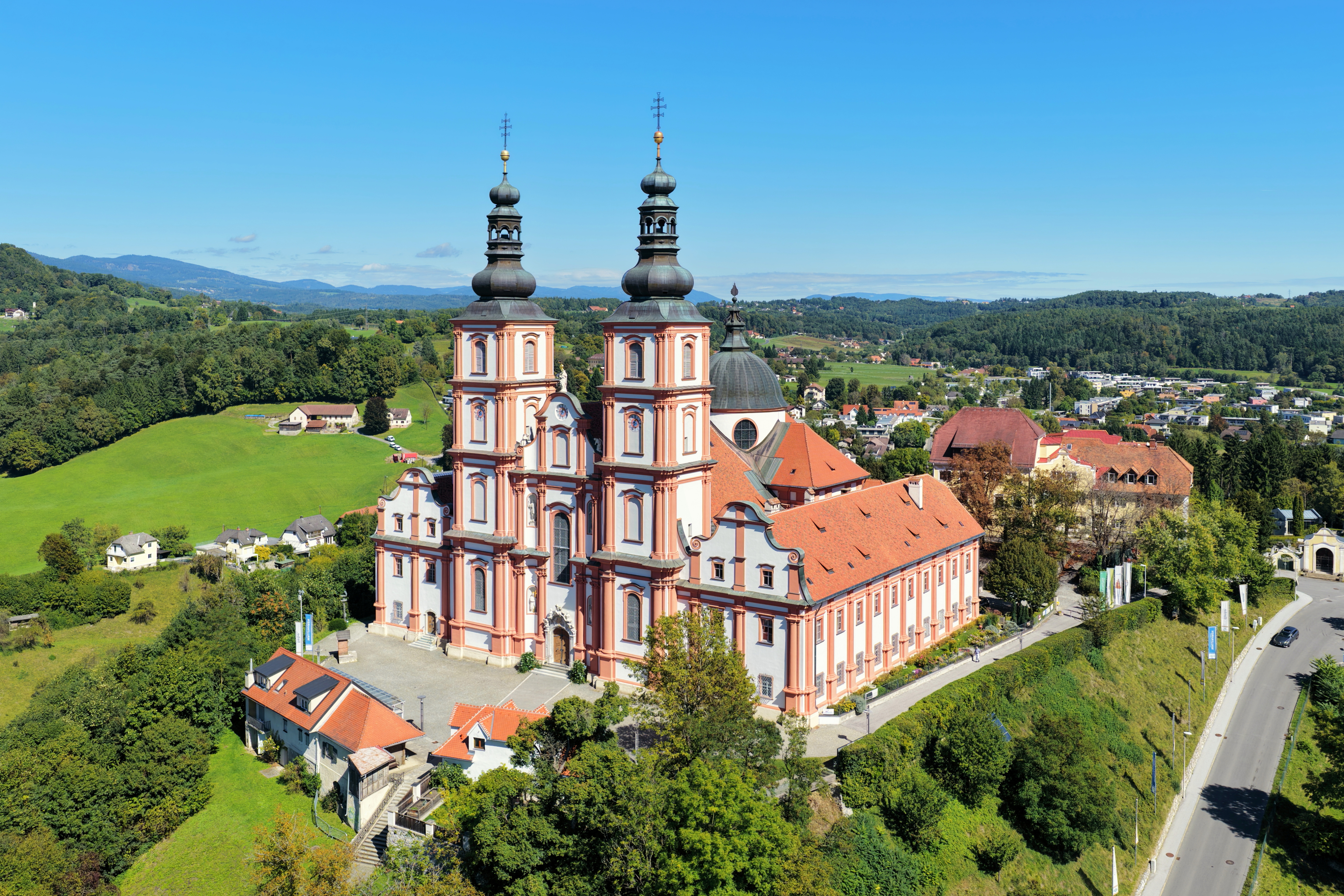
- Mariatrost church
- Interactive map of Mariatrost
- Country: Austria
- Province: Styria
- Statutory city: Graz

Area
  - Total: 13.99 km^{2} (5.40 sq mi)

Population (2023)
  - Total: 9,998
  - Density: 714.7/km^{2} (1,851/sq mi)
- Postal code: 8010, 8036, 8043, 8044

Mariatrost (German: [maˌʁiːaˈtʁoːst], from Maria ‘Mary’ + Trost ‘comfort’) is the 11th district of the Austrian city of Graz. It has a population of 9.998 (2023) and an area of 13,99km².

The Mariatrost Basilica, a famous pilgrimage site, is situated within the district, as is the Graz Tramway Museum.
