= Schlossbergbahn (Freiburg) =

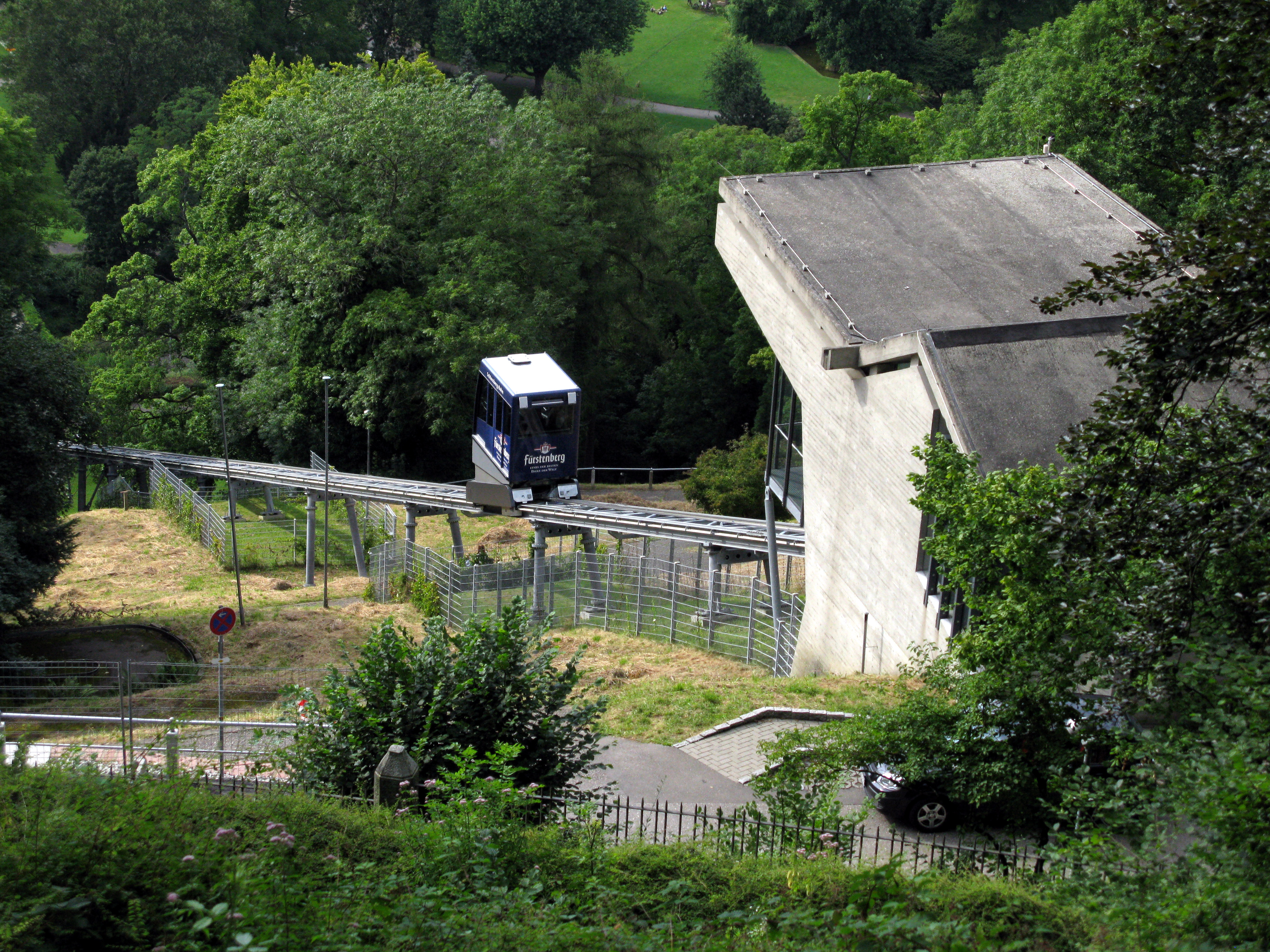
- Car approaching upper station

Overview
- Coordinates: 47°59′50″N 7°51′26″E

Service
- Type: Funicular

Technical
- Line length: 262 metres (860 ft)
- Track gauge: 1,200 mm (3 ft 11 1/4 in)
- Maximum incline: 22%

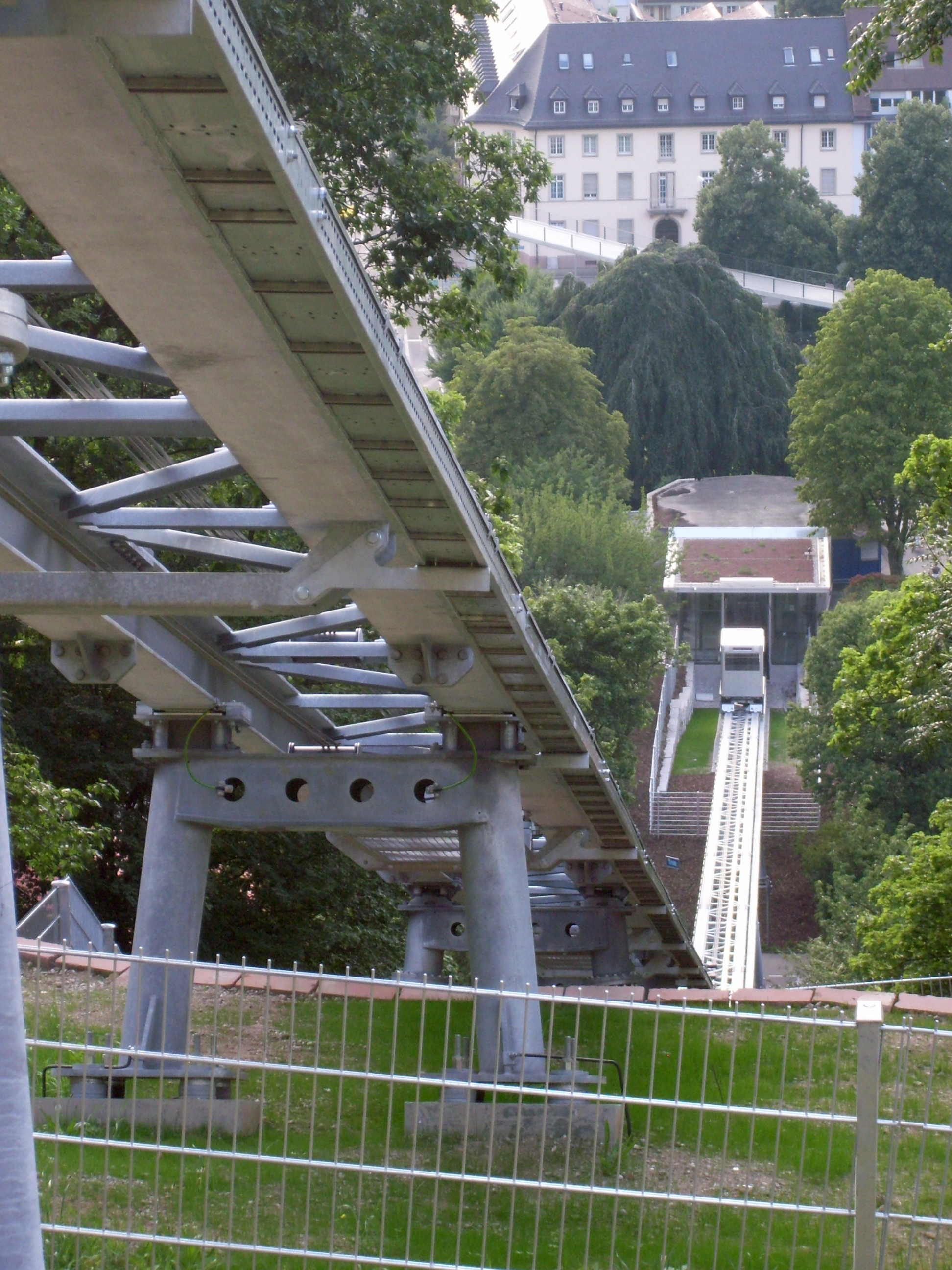
The Schlossbergbahn looking downhill, with the car in the lower station

The Schlossbergbahn (English: Castle Hill Railway) is a funicular railway in the town of Freiburg im Breisgau in Baden-Württemberg, Germany. It links the city centre with the Schlossberg hill.

The funicular was constructed in 2008, in order to replace a previous cable car that was used between 1968 and 2006. It is operated by the Schlossbergbahn GmbH & Co. KG. The line operates daily between 09:00 and 22:00 (18:00 on Tuesdays), and is accessible to wheelchairs.

The funicular has the following technical parameters:

Number of stops	2
Configuration	Single track
Length	262 metres (860 ft)
Height	73.30 metres (240.5 ft)
Maximum Steepness	22%
Cars	1
Capacity	25 passengers per car
Speed	1.5 metres per second (4.9 ft/s)
Journey time	3 minutes
Track gauge	1,200 mm (3 ft 11 1/4 in)
Traction	Electricity

== See also ==
- List of funicular railways
