= My Vote Counts! =

My Vote Counts! Meine Stimme Gilt!
- Abbreviation: GILT
- Chairman: Roland Düringer
- Founded: 14 August 2016; 9 years ago
- Headquarters: 3100 St. Pölten
- Ideology: Sortition; Anti-establishment
- National Council: 0 / 183
- Federal Council: 0 / 61
- European Parliament: 0 / 18

Website
- gilt.at

My Vote Counts! (German: Meine Stimme Gilt!), abbreviated as G!LT, is a political party in Austria. It was founded on 14 August 2016 by Roland Düringer, a popular Austrian comedian. It defines itself not as a party but as an "un-party" proposing a new, decentralised democratic system somewhat similar to demarchy. The party is anti-establishment and criticises the government of the many by only a few elected politicians.

GILT aims to implement an affirmative human right to participate in political decision making. The party was on the ballot in all Austrian states. The message of the party is to give a voice to people that do not trust the establishment, as a privileged political elite is not representative of the general will of the people. Already, about 24,760 euros has been raised to support the party.

The Party had no programme for the earlier than expected 2017 elections, stating: "Party programmes do not solve problems, only reliable citizens do," and in order to represent all citizens they choose their MPs for the 2017 parliamentary election by random drawing, an approach which they will not repeat. For upcoming elections, GILT has announced that the citizens will choose their MPs in a "candidate competition". As a second key change, GILT has announced that it will enter the next elections with a programme decided by several of the un-party's "citizen parliaments".

In the 2023 Carinthian state election My Vote Counts! ran in an electoral alliance with Vision Austria.

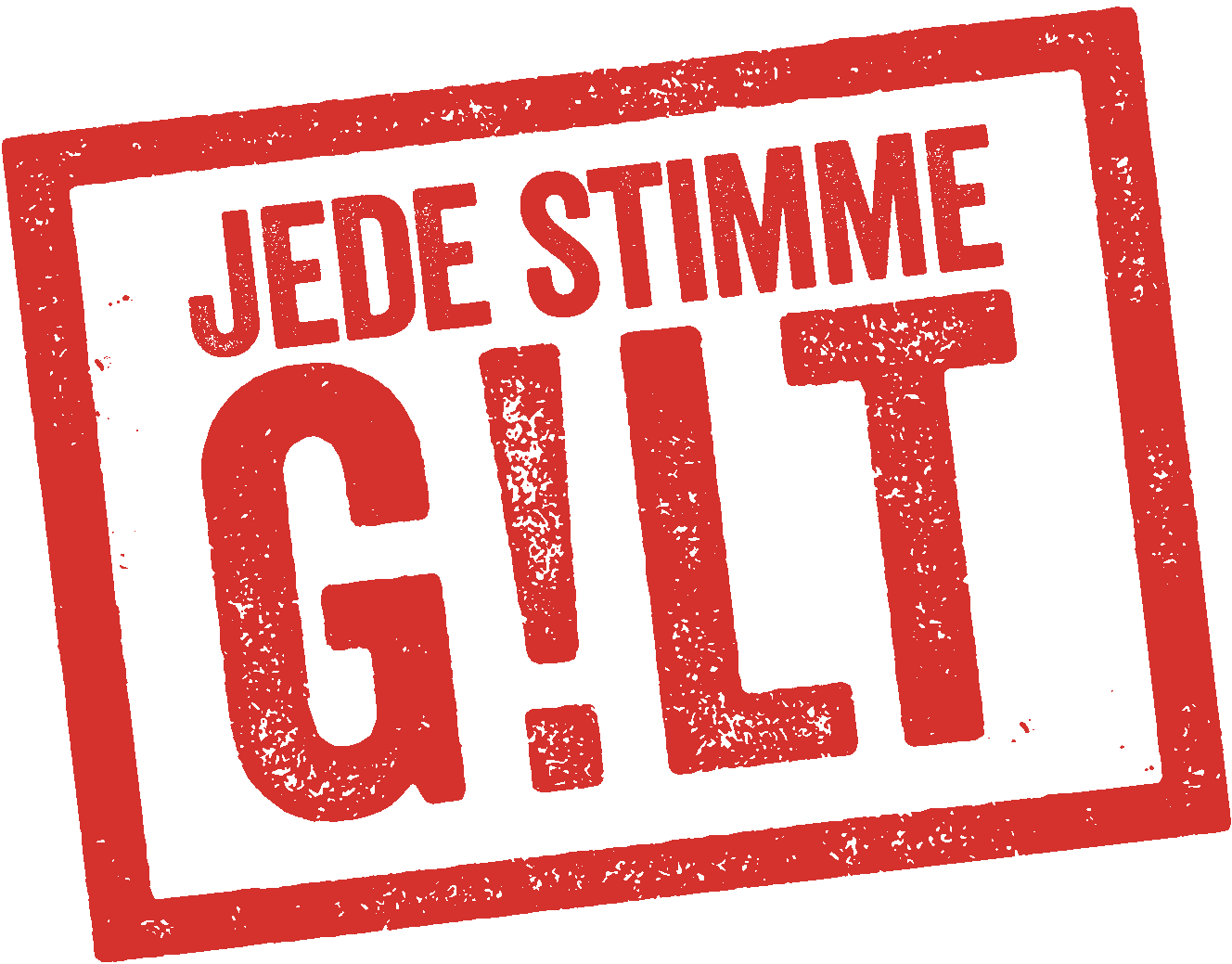
"Jede Stimme G!LT" = "Every Vote COUNTS!" Alternate logo

== Electoral results ==
=== National Council ===
Election	Votes	%	Seats	+/–	Government
2017	48,234	0.95 (#7)	0 / 183	New	Extra-parliamentary
2019	1,767	0.04 (#10)	0 / 183	0	Extra-parliamentary

=== State Parliaments ===
State	Year	Votes	%	Seats	±	Government
Vorarlberg	2019	230	0.14 (#12)	0 / 36	N/A	Extra-parliamentary
Carinthia (Note: Results of Vision Austria, which ran in an electoral alliance with My Vote Counts!)	2023	7,191	2.37 (#7)	0 / 36	N/A	Extra-parliamentary
Vorarlberg (Note: Electoral alliance between Xi – Future Opportunity, Home to all Cultures and My Vote Counts!)	2024	2,249	1.22 (#6)	0 / 36	N/A	Extra-parliamentary
