= Landtag of Carinthia =

State parliament of Carinthia, Austria

State Diet of Carinthia Kärntner Landtag
- 22nd Landtag of Carinthia
- Established: 1861

Leadership
- Governor: Daniel Fellner, Social Democratic Party of Austria

Structure
- Seats: 36
- Political groups: Government (22): SPÖ (15); ÖVP (7); Opposition (14): FPÖ (9); TK (5)
- Length of term: 5 years

Elections
- Last election: 5 March 2023
- Next election: By 2028

Meeting place
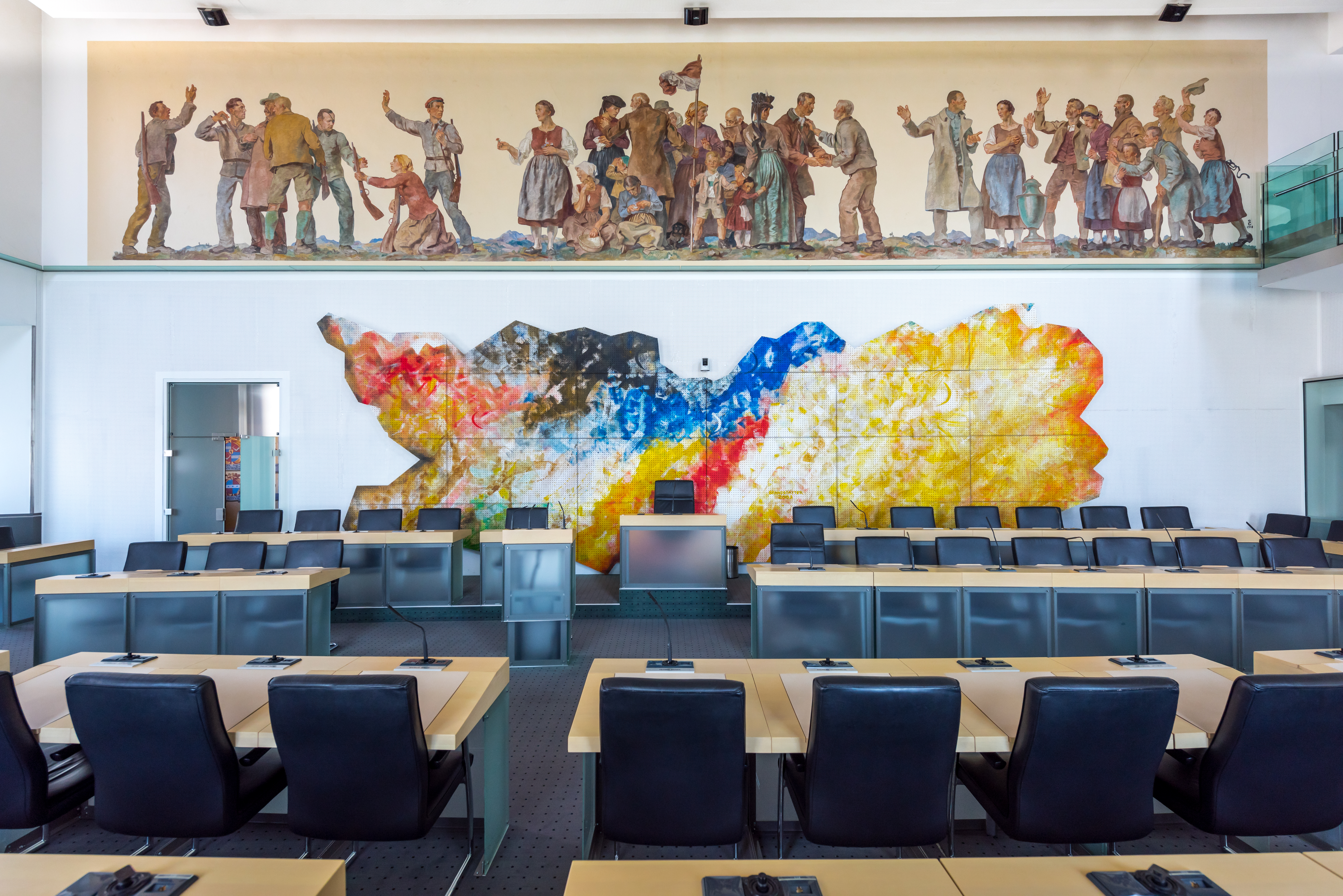
- Landhaus Klagenfurt

The Landtag of Carinthia is the elected unicameral parliament of Carinthia, a state of Austria. It was first established in 1861 and reestablished again in 1921. The most recent election of the Landtag was held in 2023.
