= 2023 Carinthian state election =

| ← 2018 | 5 March 2023 | 2028 → |

All 36 seats in the Landtag of Carinthia 19 seats needed for a majority
- Turnout: 307,434 (71.7%) ▲3.0%
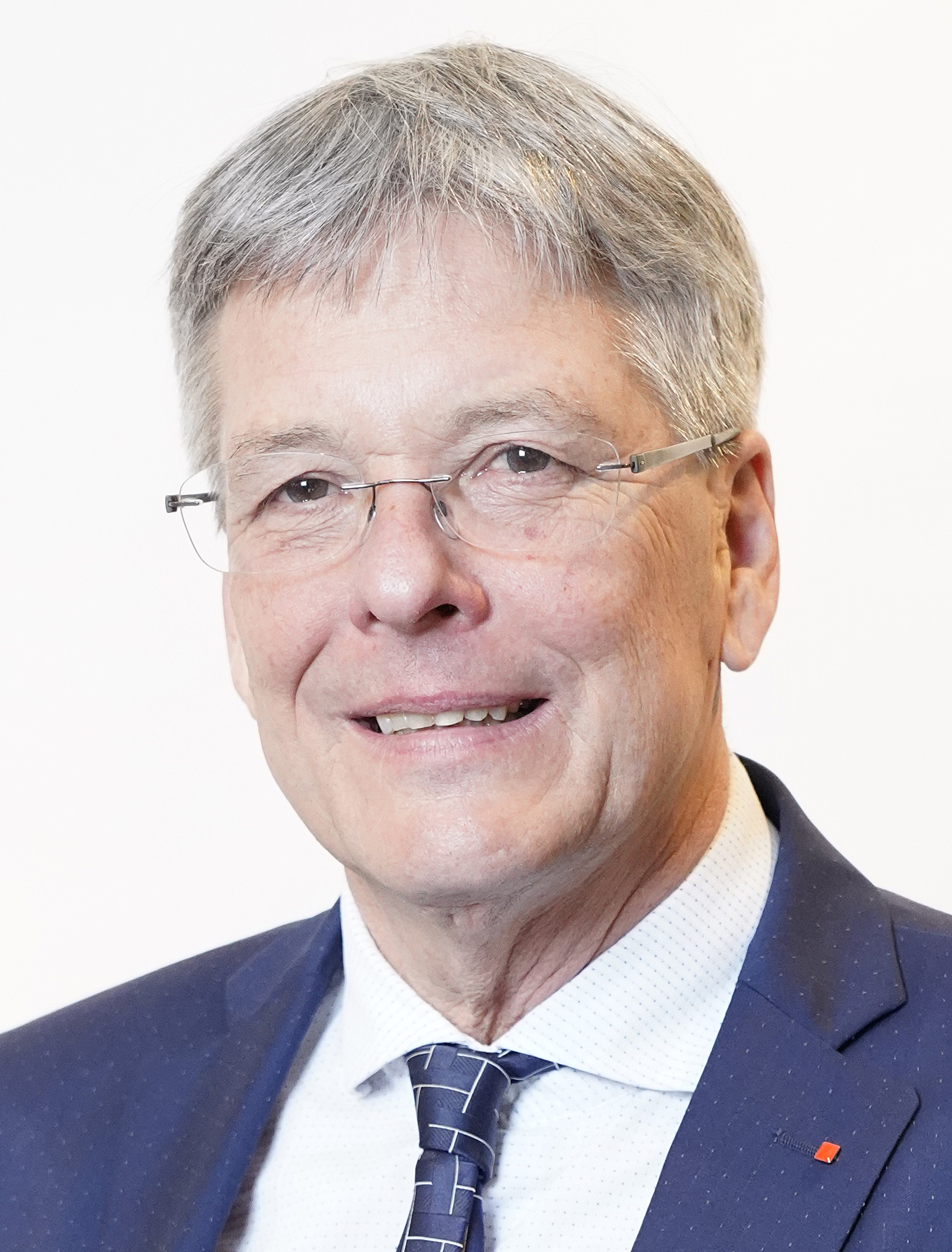

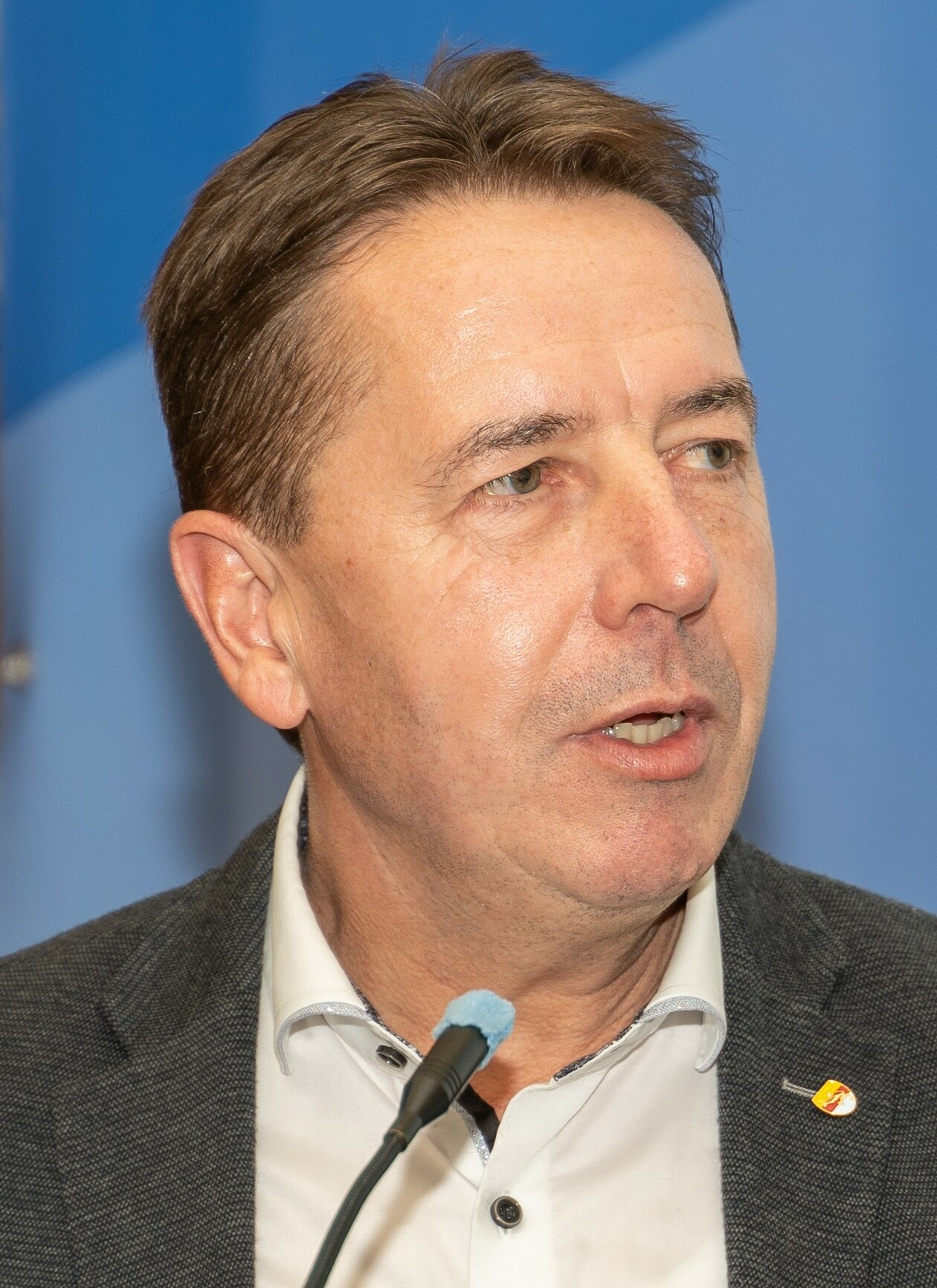

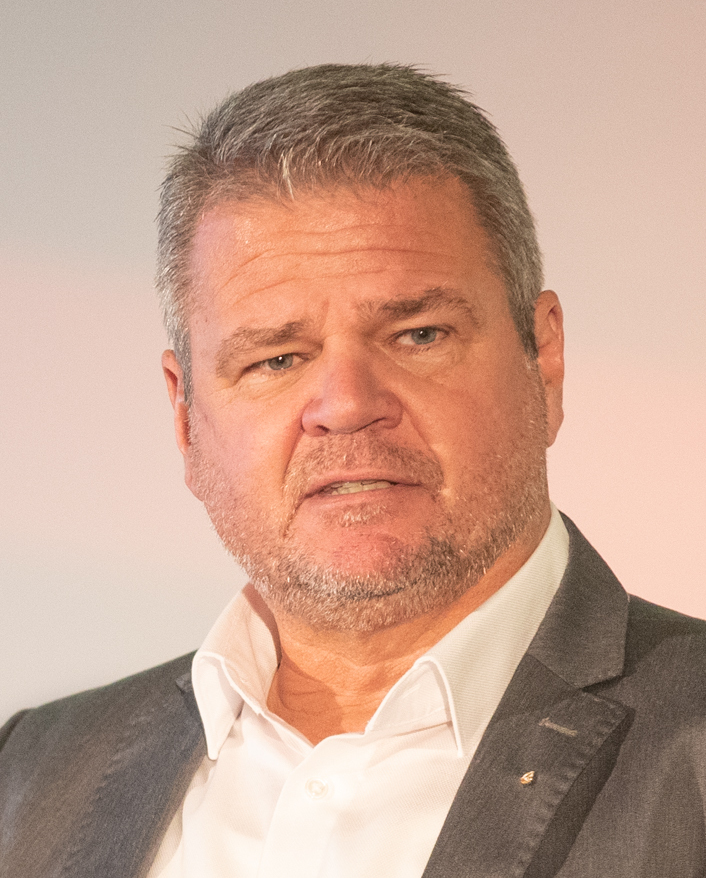
| | First party | Second party |
|---|---|---|
| Leader | Peter Kaiser | Erwin Angerer |
| Party | SPÖ | FPÖ |
| Last election | 18 seats, 47.9% | 9 seats, 23.0% |
| Seats won | 15 | 9 |
| Seat change | ▼3 | 0 |
| Popular vote | 117,962 | 74,329 |
| Percentage | 38.9% | 24.5% |
| Swing | ▼9.0% | ▲1.6% |
| | Third party | Fourth party |
| Leader | Martin Gruber | Gerhard Köfer |
| Party | ÖVP | TK |
| Last election | 6 seats, 15.5% | 3 seats, 5.7% |
| Seats won | 7 | 5 |
| Seat change | ▲1 | ▲2 |
| Popular vote | 51,637 | 30,549 |
| Percentage | 17.0% | 10.1% |
| Swing | ▲1.6% | ▲4.4% |
- Results by municipality. Light shade = relative majority. Dark shade = absolute majority.
Governor before election
Peter Kaiser
SPÖ
Elected Governor
Peter Kaiser
SPÖ

The 2023 Carinthian state election was held in the Austrian state of Carinthia on 5 March 2023.

== Background ==
In the 2018 state election, the SPÖ became the strongest party with 47.9% of the vote. The FPÖ obtained 23.0%, the ÖVP obtained 15.5%, and the Team Carinthia achieved 5.7% of the vote.

Other parties like the BZÖ, ERDE, the Greens, the KPÖ and NEOS did not reach the electoral threshold of 5%.

In June 2017, the Proporz-system was abolished in Carinthia. As a result, a coalition between the SPÖ and the ÖVP was formed after the 2018 election, in which the SPÖ fell just one seat short of an absolute majority.

== Electoral system ==
There is a 5% hurdle for entering the Carinthian state parliament, but parties can also win a seat outright in one of the 4 electoral constituencies (Grundmandat). Anyone who has their main residence in Carinthia and Austrian citizenship on the key date of January 3, 2023 and is at least 16 years old on the day of the election is entitled to vote. Parties need 100 declarations of support in each of the four constituencies or declarations of support from three members of the state parliament in order to gain ballot access. The deadline for submitting the declarations of support ended on 27 January 2023.

== Contesting parties ==
The table below lists parties represented in the previous Landtag.

The candidacy of the parties represented in the state parliament (SPÖ, FPÖ, ÖVP and Team Carinthia) was secured from the start, with the signatures of at least 3 members of the Landtag.

| Name | | Ideology | Leader | 2018 result | |
| Name | | Ideology | Leader | Votes (%) | Seats |
|---|---|---|---|---|---|
| SPÖ | Social Democratic Party of Austria; Sozialdemokratische Partei Österreichs | Social democracy | Peter Kaiser | 47.9% | 18 / 36 |
| FPÖ | Freedom Party of Austria; Freiheitliche Partei Österreichs | Right-wing populism Euroscepticism | Erwin Angerer | 23.0% | 9 / 36 |
| ÖVP | Austrian People's Party; Österreichische Volkspartei | Conservatism | Martin Gruber | 15.5% | 6 / 36 |
| TK | Team Carinthia; Team Kärnten | Centrist Populism; Regionalism | Gerhard Köfer | 5.7% | 3 / 36 |

Additional parties on the ballot

Due to their exit from the state parliament in the 2018 election, the Greens had to collect declarations of support in order to gain ballot access. The same applied to NEOS, which had never been represented in the Carinthian state parliament. The new Vision Austria party also tried to get declarations of support. The party was founded by Alexander Todor-Kostic, former state spokesman and designated top candidate of the MFG. The BZÖ tried to run together with other lists as part of the Free Citizens' Party under the name Alliance for Carinthia. The small environmentalist party Responsibility Earth, which achieved respectable success in 2018, will not run in 2023. The KPÖ and the Stark list were only able to gather enough signatures in a few constituencies.

The state elections authority thus announced on 27 January 2023 that nominations for the state elections on 5 March 2023 had been submitted by ten campaigning groups within the deadline.

The following 4 parties will also be on the ballot statewide (with their lead candidates):

- The Greens of Carinthia (abbreviation: GRÜNE) with lead candidate Olga Voglauer (Member of the National Council, state spokeswoman for the Greens).
- NEOS - for Freedom, Progress and Justice (abbreviation: NEOS) with lead candidate Janos Juvan (entrepreneur, municipal council member in Klagenfurt, NEOS state spokesman).
- Vision Austria - Carinthia state party (abbreviation: VÖ) with lead candidate Alexander Todor-Kostic. (Lawyer, Vision Austria federal party spokesman).
- Alliance for Carinthia, Together for Fresach, A Good Option, Free State of Carinthia, List Jörg (abbreviation: BFK) with lead candidate Karlheinz Klement (BZÖ General Secretary).
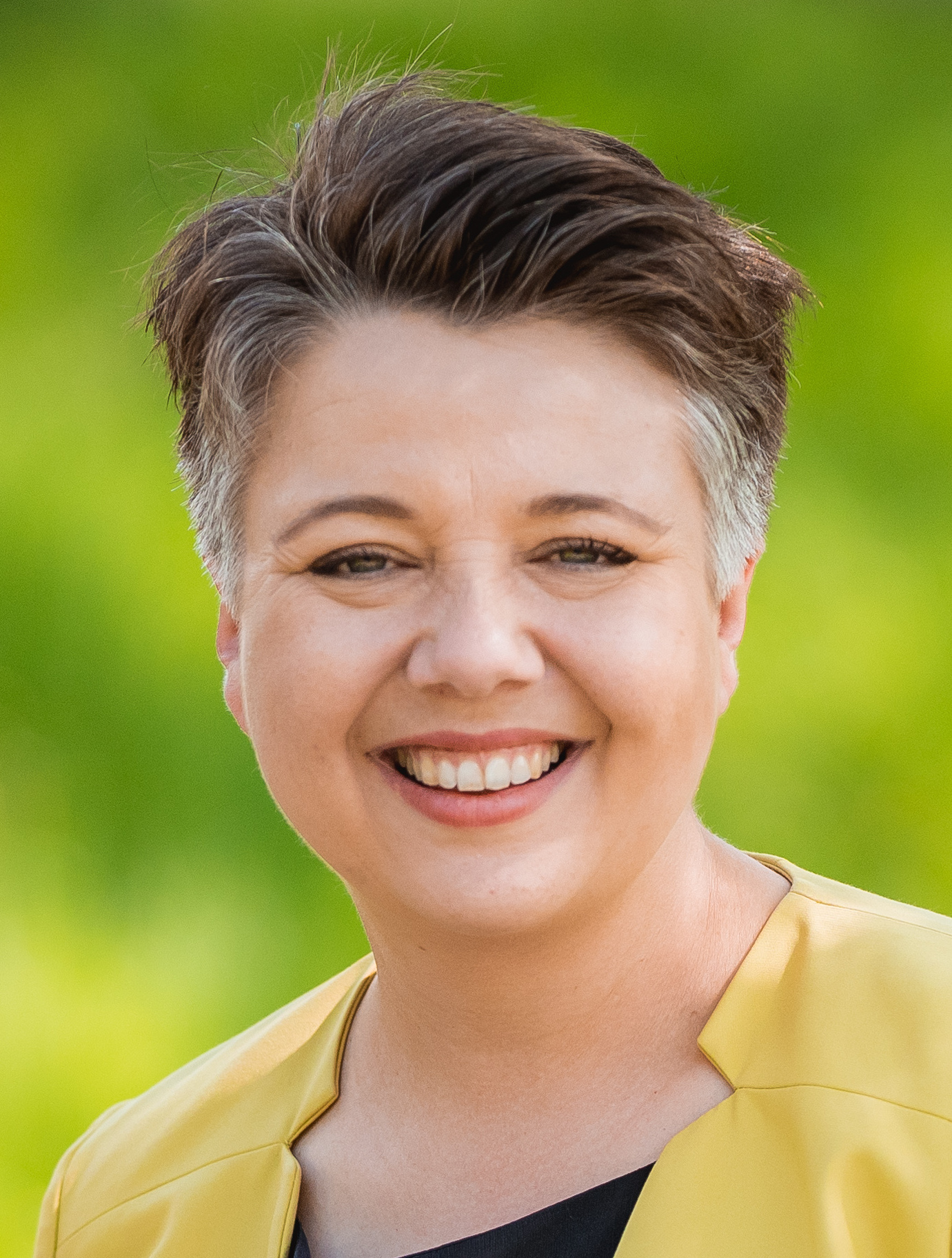
Olga Voglauer
(GRÜNE)

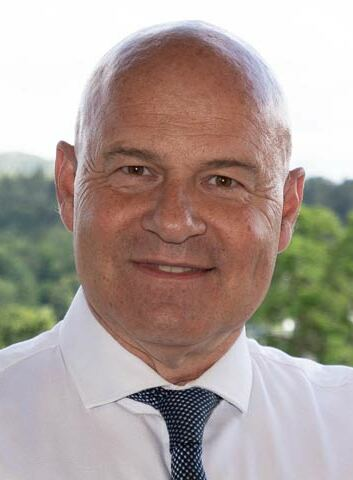
Alexander Todor-Kostic
(VÖ)

Only in constituencies 1 and 2 (Klagenfurt, Klagenfurt-Land, St. Veit an der Glan, Wolfsberg, Völkermarkt):

- List Stark (abbreviation: STARK) with lead candidate Johann Ehmann.

Only in constituency 3 (Villach, Villach-Land):

- Communist Party of Austria – Carinthia/Koroška (abbreviation: KPÖ) with lead candidate Karin Peuker.

After reviewing the election proposals, they were finally approved by the state electoral authority on Thursday, February 2, 2023.

== Opinion polling ==
| Polling firm | Fieldwork date | Sample size | SPÖ | FPÖ | ÖVP | TK | Grüne | NEOS | MFG | Others | Lead |
|---|---|---|---|---|---|---|---|---|---|---|---|
| 2023 state election | 5 March 2023 | – | 38.9 | 24.6 | 17.0 | 10.1 | 3.9 | 2.6 | – | 3.0 | 14.3 |
| Market-Lazarsfeld/ÖSTERREICH | 20–22 Feb 2023 | 860 | 42 | 26 | 10 | 12 | 4 | 4 | – | 2 | 16 |
| Peter Hajek/Kleine Zeitung | 13–17 Feb 2023 | 800 | 43 | 23 | 11 | 13 | 4 | 4 | – | 2 (Note: Vision Austria: 2 %) | 20 |
| IFDD/Krone | 17 Jan–11 Feb 2023 | 500 | 46 | 23 | 10 | 11 | 5 | 3 | – | 2 | 23 |
| 2-morrow+telemark/5 min | 18 Jul–16 Aug 2022 | 600 | 42 | 20 | 11 | 10 | 8 | 4 | – | 5 | 22 |
| Peter Hajek/Kleine Zeitung | 28 Feb–3 Mar 2022 | 800 | 48 | 15 | 13 | 7 | 4 | 3 | 7 | 3 | 33 |
| 2018 state election | 4 Mar 2018 | – | 47.9 | 23.0 | 15.5 | 5.7 | 3.1 | 2.1 | – | 2.7 | 20.3 |

== Results ==
| Party | Votes | % | +/− | Seats | +/− |
|---|---|---|---|---|---|
| Social Democratic Party of Austria (SPÖ) | 117,962 | 38.94 | –9.00 | 15 | –3 |
| Freedom Party of Austria (FPÖ) | 74,329 | 24.53 | +1.57 | 9 | ±0 |
| Austrian People's Party (ÖVP) | 51,637 | 17.04 | +1.59 | 7 | +1 |
| Team Carinthia (TK) | 30,549 | 10.08 | +4.41 | 5 | +2 |
| The Greens – The Green Alternative (GRÜNE) | 11,676 | 3.85 | +0.73 | 0 | ±0 |
| NEOS – The New Austria and Liberal Forum (NEOS) | 7,840 | 2.59 | +0.45 | 0 | ±0 |
| Vision Austria (VÖ) | 7,191 | 2.37 | New | 0 | New |
| Alliance for Carinthia (BFK) | 1,270 | 0.42 | New | 0 | New |
| Communist Party of Austria (KPÖ) | 349 | 0.12 | –0.16 | 0 | ±0 |
| List Stark (STARK) | 167 | 0.06 | New | 0 | New |
| Invalid/blank votes | 4,464 | – | – | – | – |
| Total | 307,434 | 100 | – | 36 | 0 |
| Registered voters/turnout | 428,929 | 71.67 | +3.04 | – | – |
Source: Carinthian Government Carinthian Government (Maps, Analysis)

== Aftermath ==
The SPÖ announced that it would negotiate with all 3 parties who are represented in the new Landtag, first with the FPÖ, then with the ÖVP and finally with the Team Carinthia. For the new term, experts predicted a continuation of the current SPÖ-ÖVP government.

On 14 March 2023, the SPÖ started official coalition talks with the ÖVP.

On 31 March 2023, the SPÖ and ÖVP announced the official renewal of their coalition for another term of 5 years.
