= Villach (National Council electoral district) =

Parliamentary electoral district in Austria

- Beljak
- Electoral District for the National Council
- Location of Villach within Austria
- District: List: Villach City; Villach Rural
- State: Carinthia
- Population: 131,154 (2024)
- Electorate: 95,989 (2019)
- Area: 1,144 km^{2} (2023)

Current Electoral District
- Created: 1994
- Seats: 3 (1994–present)

Villach (Slovene: Beljak), also known as Electoral District 2B (German: Wahlkreis 2B), is one of the 39 multi-member regional electoral districts of the National Council, the lower house of the Austrian Parliament, the national legislature of Austria. The electoral district was created in 1992 when electoral regulations were amended to add regional electoral districts to the existing state-wide electoral districts and came into being at the following legislative election in 1994. It consists of the city of Villach and the district of Villach Rural in the state of Carinthia. The electoral district currently elects three of the 183 members of the National Council using the open party-list proportional representation electoral system. At the 2019 legislative election the constituency had 95,989 registered electors.

== History ==
Villach was one 43 regional electoral districts (regionalwahlkreise) established by the "National Council Electoral Regulations 1992" (Nationalrats-Wahlordnung 1992) passed by the National Council in 1992. It consisted of the city of Villach and the district of Villach Rural in the state of Carinthia. The district was initially allocated three seats in May 1993.

== Electoral system ==
Villach currently elects three of the 183 members of the National Council using the open party-list proportional representation electoral system. The allocation of seats is carried out in three stages. In the first stage, seats are allocated to parties (lists) at the regional level using a state-wide Hare quota (wahlzahl) (valid votes in the state divided by the number of seats in the state). In the second stage, seats are allocated to parties at the state/provincial level using the state-wide Hare quota (any seats won by the party at the regional stage are subtracted from the party's state seats). In the third and final stage, seats are allocated to parties at the federal/national level using the D'Hondt method (any seats won by the party at the regional and state stages are subtracted from the party's federal seats). Only parties that reach the 4% national threshold, or have won a seat at the regional stage, compete for seats at the state and federal stages.

Electors may cast one preferential vote for individual candidates at the regional, state and federal levels. Split-ticket voting (panachage), or voting for more than one candidate at each level, is not permitted and will result in the ballot paper being invalidated. At the regional level, candidates must receive preferential votes amounting to at least 14% of the valid votes cast for their party to over-ride the order of the party list (10% and 7% respectively for the state and federal levels). Prior to April 2013 electors could not cast preferential votes at the federal level and the thresholds candidates needed to over-ride the party list order were higher at the regional level (half the Hare quota or 1/6 of the party votes) and state level (Hare quota).

== Election results ==
=== Summary ===
Election	Communists KPÖ+ / KPÖ			Social Democrats SPÖ			Greens GRÜNE			NEOS NEOS / LiF			People's ÖVP			Alliance for the Future BZÖ			Freedom FPÖ		
Election	Votes	%	Seats	Votes	%	Seats	Votes	%	Seats	Votes	%	Seats	Votes	%	Seats	Votes	%	Seats	Votes	%	Seats
2019	411	0.60%	0	19,637	28.67%	0	6,871	10.03%	0	4,869	7.11%	0	21,777	31.79%	0	111	0.16%	0	13,172	19.23%	0
2017	398	0.53%	0	23,894	32.00%	0	1,852	2.48%	0	3,265	4.37%	0	17,411	23.32%	0				23,813	31.89%	0
2013	451	0.65%	0	24,406	35.40%	1	8,479	12.30%	0	2,688	3.90%	0	8,052	11.68%	0	6,565	9.52%	0	12,659	18.36%	0
2008	479	0.64%	0	23,747	31.51%	0	5,391	7.15%	0	1,088	1.44%	0	8,689	11.53%	0	28,292	37.54%	1	5,753	7.63%	0
2006	709	1.00%	0	28,350	40.10%	1	5,441	7.70%	0				12,295	17.39%	0	15,924	22.52%	0	5,386	7.62%	0
2002	493	0.65%	0	32,436	42.88%	1	4,968	6.57%	0	670	0.89%	0	19,257	25.46%	0				17,811	23.55%	0
1999	334	0.46%	0	28,498	39.06%	1	4,218	5.78%	0	1,809	2.48%	0	8,852	12.13%	0				28,420	38.95%	1
1995	257	0.34%	0	34,300	45.02%	1	2,733	3.59%	0	2,874	3.77%	0	11,121	14.60%	0				24,316	31.91%	0
1994	216	0.29%	0	31,786	43.30%	1	4,497	6.13%	0	2,941	4.01%	0	9,045	12.32%	0				24,277	33.07%	0

=== Detailed ===
==== 2010s ====
===== 2019 =====
Results of the 2019 legislative election held on 29 September 2019:

Party		Votes per district			Total votes	%	Seats
Party		Villach City	Villach Rural	Voting card	Total votes	%	Seats
Austrian People's Party	ÖVP	9,450	12,241	86	21,777	31.79%	0
Social Democratic Party of Austria	SPÖ	8,877	10,706	54	19,637	28.67%	0
Freedom Party of Austria	FPÖ	5,494	7,634	44	13,172	19.23%	0
The Greens – The Green Alternative	GRÜNE	3,492	3,295	84	6,871	10.03%	0
NEOS – The New Austria and Liberal Forum	NEOS	2,385	2,433	51	4,869	7.11%	0
JETZT	JETZT	655	603	11	1,269	1.85%	0
KPÖ Plus	KPÖ+	214	194	3	411	0.60%	0
Der Wandel	WANDL	193	188	1	382	0.56%	0
Alliance for the Future of Austria	BZÖ	51	59	1	111	0.16%	0
Valid Votes		30,811	37,353	335	68,499	100.00%	0
Rejected Votes		446	706	4	1,156	1.66%	
Total Polled		31,257	38,059	339	69,655	72.57%	
Registered Electors		44,596	51,393		95,989		
Turnout		70.09%	74.05%		72.57%		

===== 2017 =====
Results of the 2017 legislative election held on 15 October 2017:

Party		Votes per district			Total votes	%	Seats
Party		Villach City	Villach Rural	Voting card	Total votes	%	Seats
Social Democratic Party of Austria	SPÖ	10,927	12,863	104	23,894	32.00%	0
Freedom Party of Austria	FPÖ	10,323	13,401	89	23,813	31.89%	0
Austrian People's Party	ÖVP	7,683	9,630	98	17,411	23.32%	0
NEOS – The New Austria and Liberal Forum	NEOS	1,637	1,573	55	3,265	4.37%	0
Peter Pilz List	PILZ	1,484	1,389	34	2,907	3.89%	0
The Greens – The Green Alternative	GRÜNE	914	906	32	1,852	2.48%	0
My Vote Counts!	GILT	419	443	5	867	1.16%	0
Communist Party of Austria	KPÖ	196	199	3	398	0.53%	0
The Whites	WEIßE	80	84	2	166	0.22%	0
Free List Austria	FLÖ	44	49	0	93	0.12%	0
Valid Votes		33,707	40,537	422	74,666	100.00%	0
Rejected Votes		388	553	1	942	1.25%	
Total Polled		34,095	41,090	423	75,608	78.46%	
Registered Electors		44,782	51,577		96,359		
Turnout		76.14%	79.67%		78.46%		

===== 2013 =====
Results of the 2013 legislative election held on 29 September 2013:

Party		Votes per district			Total votes	%	Seats
Party		Villach City	Villach Rural	Voting card	Total votes	%	Seats
Social Democratic Party of Austria	SPÖ	10,932	13,426	48	24,406	35.40%	1
Freedom Party of Austria	FPÖ	5,349	7,279	31	12,659	18.36%	0
The Greens – The Green Alternative	GRÜNE	4,289	4,120	70	8,479	12.30%	0
Austrian People's Party	ÖVP	3,340	4,682	30	8,052	11.68%	0
Alliance for the Future of Austria	BZÖ	2,818	3,717	30	6,565	9.52%	0
Team Stronach	FRANK	2,270	2,838	10	5,118	7.42%	0
NEOS – The New Austria	NEOS	1,296	1,366	26	2,688	3.90%	0
Pirate Party of Austria	PIRAT	261	258	3	522	0.76%	0
Communist Party of Austria	KPÖ	213	233	5	451	0.65%	0
Valid Votes		30,768	37,919	253	68,940	100.00%	1
Rejected Votes		523	688	0	1,211	1.73%	
Total Polled		31,291	38,607	253	70,151	72.25%	
Registered Electors		45,015	52,077		97,092		
Turnout		69.51%	74.13%		72.25%		

The following candidates were elected:

- Party mandates - Hermann Lipitsch (SPÖ), 2,793 votes.

==== 2000s ====
===== 2008 =====
Results of the 2008 legislative election held on 28 September 2008:

Party		Votes per district			Total votes	%	Seats
Party		Villach City	Villach Rural	Voting card	Total votes	%	Seats
Alliance for the Future of Austria	BZÖ	12,306	15,792	194	28,292	37.54%	1
Social Democratic Party of Austria	SPÖ	10,573	13,012	162	23,747	31.51%	0
Austrian People's Party	ÖVP	3,800	4,717	172	8,689	11.53%	0
Freedom Party of Austria	FPÖ	2,705	2,976	72	5,753	7.63%	0
The Greens – The Green Alternative	GRÜNE	2,792	2,355	244	5,391	7.15%	0
Liberal Forum	LiF	447	584	57	1,088	1.44%	0
Fritz Dinkhauser List – Citizens' Forum Tyrol	FRITZ	337	396	11	744	0.99%	0
Independent Citizens' Initiative Save Austria	RETTÖ	280	318	6	604	0.80%	0
Communist Party of Austria	KPÖ	236	228	15	479	0.64%	0
The Christians	DC	221	226	9	456	0.61%	0
List Strong	STARK	38	22	0	60	0.08%	0
List Karlheinz Klement	KHK	32	27	0	59	0.08%	0
Valid Votes		33,767	40,653	942	75,362	100.00%	1
Rejected Votes		656	902	16	1,574	2.05%	
Total Polled		34,423	41,555	958	76,936	78.91%	
Registered Electors		45,009	52,484		97,493		
Turnout		76.48%	79.18%		78.91%		

The following candidates were elected:

- Party mandates - Maximilian Linder (BZÖ), 1,883 votes.

===== 2006 =====
Results of the 2006 legislative election held on 1 October 2006:

Party		Votes per district			Total votes	%	Seats
Party		Villach City	Villach Rural	Voting card	Total votes	%	Seats
Social Democratic Party of Austria	SPÖ	12,429	14,881	1,040	28,350	40.10%	1
Alliance for the Future of Austria	BZÖ	6,591	8,894	439	15,924	22.52%	0
Austrian People's Party	ÖVP	5,201	6,196	898	12,295	17.39%	0
The Greens – The Green Alternative	GRÜNE	2,417	2,318	706	5,441	7.70%	0
Freedom Party of Austria	FPÖ	2,527	2,634	225	5,386	7.62%	0
Hans-Peter Martin's List	MATIN	809	851	50	1,710	2.42%	0
Communist Party of Austria	KPÖ	304	352	53	709	1.00%	0
Certainly – Absolutely – Independent, Franz Radinger	SAU	324	242	25	591	0.84%	0
EU Withdrawal – Neutral Free Austria	NFÖ	108	124	8	240	0.34%	0
List Strong	STARK	20	38	1	59	0.08%	0
Valid Votes		30,730	36,530	3,445	70,705	100.00%	1
Rejected Votes		581	910	50	1,541	2.13%	
Total Polled		31,311	37,440	3,495	72,246	76.81%	
Registered Electors		43,665	50,399		94,064		
Turnout		71.71%	74.29%		76.81%		

The following candidates were elected:

- Party mandates - Christine Muttonen (SPÖ), 3,845 votes.

===== 2002 =====
Results of the 2002 legislative election held on 24 November 2002:

Party		Votes per district			Total votes	%	Seats
Party		Villach City	Villach Rural	Voting card	Total votes	%	Seats
Social Democratic Party of Austria	SPÖ	14,463	16,947	1,026	32,436	42.88%	1
Austrian People's Party	ÖVP	8,127	9,768	1,362	19,257	25.46%	0
Freedom Party of Austria	FPÖ	7,581	9,675	555	17,811	23.55%	0
The Greens – The Green Alternative	GRÜNE	2,183	1,955	830	4,968	6.57%	0
Liberal Forum	LiF	314	315	41	670	0.89%	0
Communist Party of Austria	KPÖ	220	256	17	493	0.65%	0
Valid Votes		32,888	38,916	3,831	75,635	100.00%	1
Rejected Votes		634	849	34	1,517	1.97%	
Total Polled		33,522	39,765	3,865	77,152	83.95%	
Registered Electors		42,762	49,144		91,906		
Turnout		78.39%	80.92%		83.95%		

The following candidates were elected:

- Party mandates - Christine Muttonen (SPÖ), 4,853 votes.

==== 1990s ====
===== 1999 =====
Results of the 1999 legislative election held on 3 October 1999:

Party		Votes per district			Total votes	%	Seats
Party		Villach City	Villach Rural	Voting card	Total votes	%	Seats
Social Democratic Party of Austria	SPÖ	12,286	15,145	1,067	28,498	39.06%	1
Freedom Party of Austria	FPÖ	12,610	14,614	1,196	28,420	38.95%	1
Austrian People's Party	ÖVP	3,562	4,712	578	8,852	12.13%	0
The Greens – The Green Alternative	GRÜNE	1,938	1,789	491	4,218	5.78%	0
Liberal Forum	LiF	769	691	349	1,809	2.48%	0
The Independents	DU	302	289	26	617	0.85%	0
Communist Party of Austria	KPÖ	163	157	14	334	0.46%	0
No to NATO and EU – Neutral Austria Citizens' Initiative	NEIN	97	110	8	215	0.29%	0
Valid Votes		31,727	37,507	3,729	72,963	100.00%	2
Rejected Votes		475	668	30	1,173	1.58%	
Total Polled		32,202	38,175	3,759	74,136	80.79%	
Registered Electors		42,608	49,160		91,768		
Turnout		75.58%	77.65%		80.79%		

The following candidates were elected:

- Party mandates - Christine Muttonen (SPÖ), 2,704 votes; and Roland Zellot (FPÖ), 1,912 votes.

===== 1995 =====
Results of the 1995 legislative election held on 17 December 1995:

Party		Votes per district			Total votes	%	Seats
Party		Villach City	Villach Rural	Voting card	Total votes	%	Seats
Social Democratic Party of Austria	SPÖ	15,389	17,946	965	34,300	45.02%	1
Freedom Party of Austria	FPÖ	10,727	12,831	758	24,316	31.91%	0
Austrian People's Party	ÖVP	4,795	5,610	716	11,121	14.60%	0
Liberal Forum	LiF	1,231	1,175	468	2,874	3.77%	0
The Greens – The Green Alternative	GRÜNE	1,142	1,146	445	2,733	3.59%	0
No – Civic Action Group; Against the Sale of Austria	NEIN	168	202	20	390	0.51%	0
Communist Party of Austria	KPÖ	117	132	8	257	0.34%	0
The Best Party	DBP	89	108	8	205	0.27%	0
Valid Votes		33,658	39,150	3,388	76,196	100.00%	1
Rejected Votes		773	964	42	1,779	2.28%	
Total Polled		34,431	40,114	3,430	77,975	86.18%	
Registered Electors		42,114	48,363		90,477		
Turnout		81.76%	82.94%		86.18%		

The following candidates were elected:

- Party mandates - Karl Gerfried Müller (SPÖ), 1,571 votes.

===== 1994 =====
Results of the 1994 legislative election held on 9 October 1994:

Party		Votes per district			Total votes	%	Seats
Party		Villach City	Villach Rural	Voting card	Total votes	%	Seats
Social Democratic Party of Austria	SPÖ	13,777	16,813	1,196	31,786	43.30%	1
Freedom Party of Austria	FPÖ	10,678	12,524	1,075	24,277	33.07%	0
Austrian People's Party	ÖVP	3,644	4,874	527	9,045	12.32%	0
The Greens – The Green Alternative	GRÜNE	2,012	1,856	629	4,497	6.13%	0
Liberal Forum	LiF	1,376	1,117	448	2,941	4.01%	0
No – Civic Action Group; Against the Sale of Austria	NEIN	160	195	23	378	0.51%	0
Communist Party of Austria	KPÖ	95	108	13	216	0.29%	0
The Best Party	DBP	65	71	9	145	0.20%	0
United Greens Austria – List Adi Pinter	VGÖ	50	60	7	117	0.16%	0
Valid Votes		31,857	37,618	3,927	73,402	100.00%	1
Rejected Votes		575	778	34	1,387	1.85%	
Total Polled		32,432	38,396	3,961	74,789	82.48%	
Registered Electors		42,181	48,489		90,670		
Turnout		76.89%	79.18%		82.48%		

The following candidates were elected:

- Party mandates - Karl Gerfried Müller (SPÖ), 2,498 votes.
