= Maximilian Linder =

Austrian politician (born 1965)

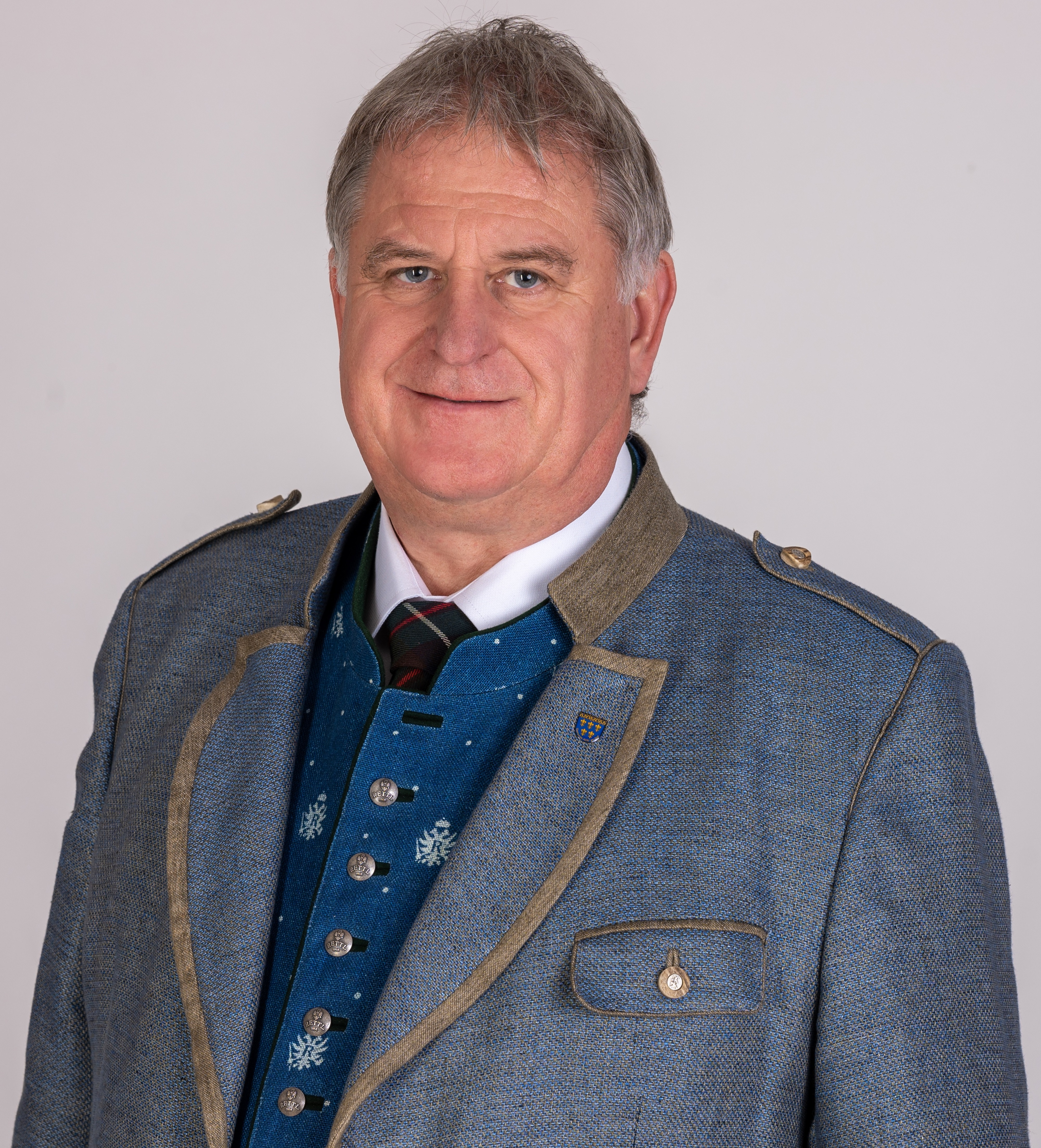
- Linder in 2023

Member of the National Council
- Incumbent
- Assumed office 17 April 2023
- Preceded by: Erwin Angerer
- Constituency: Villach
- In office 9 November 2017 – 22 October 2019
- Constituency: Carinthia
- In office 28 October 2008 – 28 October 2013
- Constituency: Villach

Personal details
- Born: 22 March 1965 (age 61)
- Party: Freedom Party

Maximilian Linder (born 22 March 1965) is an Austrian politician from the Freedom Party. He has been a member of the National Council since 2023, having previously served from 2008 to 2013 and 2017 to 2019. Since 2003, he has also served as mayor of Afritz am See.
