= Vision Austria =

Vision Austria Vision Österreich
- Abbreviation: VÖ
- Leader: Alexander Todor-Kostic
- Founder: Alexander Todor-Kostic
- Founded: 21 July 2022
- Registered: 31 December 2022
- Split from: MFG Austria
- Headquarters: Karawankenplatz 1 9220 Velden am Wörther See
- Ideology: COVID-19 scepticism
- Colours: Yellow
- National Council: 0 / 183
- Landtags: 0 / 440

Website
- www.vision-oesterreich.at

Vision Austria (German: Vision Österreich, VÖ) is an Austrian minor party that made its electoral debut in the 2023 Carinthian state election.

== History ==
Vision Österreich was founded in July 2022 by the Carinthian lawyer Alexander Todor-Kostic. He had previously been the Carinthian state spokesman for the MFG Austria, which emerged during the course of the COVID-19 pandemic, and was considered its likely top candidate for the state elections in March 2023. However, after an internal party conflict, he was dismissed by the MFG federal executive board in May 2022 because of "party-damaging behavior" and relieved of his function. In July 2022, Todor-Kostic announced the founding of Vision Austria, with the first goal of the party being to enter the Carinthian state parliament. At the time it was founded, regional groups existed in Carinthia, Tyrol and Styria.

The filing of the party statutes with the Austrian Ministry of the Interior and thus the official founding of the party took place on 21 July 2022. On 31 December 2022, the Vision Austria – Provincial Party of Carinthia (VÖK) was also registered as an independent party. According to its statute, the activities of Vision Austria extend to the entire federal territory. The federal party is set up as an umbrella organization for the legally independent state organisations. These should each act autonomously in their area, but must not contradict “the principles and basic values” of the federal party.

=== 2023 Carinthian state election ===
On 23 January 2023, the party announced that it had collected the declarations of support required to run in the Carinthian state elections. The top candidate is state party spokesman Alexander Todor-Kostic. Immediately afterVÖ was founded, he emphasized that Vision Austria was "not an MFG II". The party presented a 19-part election program for the state elections and called for the maintenance of Klagenfurt Airport, the improvement of nursing care and the passing on of Kelag's profits to the population. In addition to state issues, the program also touched on federal policy issues (processing of the coronavirus measures, maintaining neutrality, and price reductions). It ultimately did not win a single seat.

== Electoral results ==
=== State Parliaments ===
State	Year	Votes	%	Seats	±	Government
Carinthia	2023	7,191	2.37 (#7)	0 / 36	N/A	Extra-parliamentary
