= Landhaus Klagenfurt =

Country house/secular building in Klagenfurt, Austria

Coordinates: 46.6250°N 14.3057°E

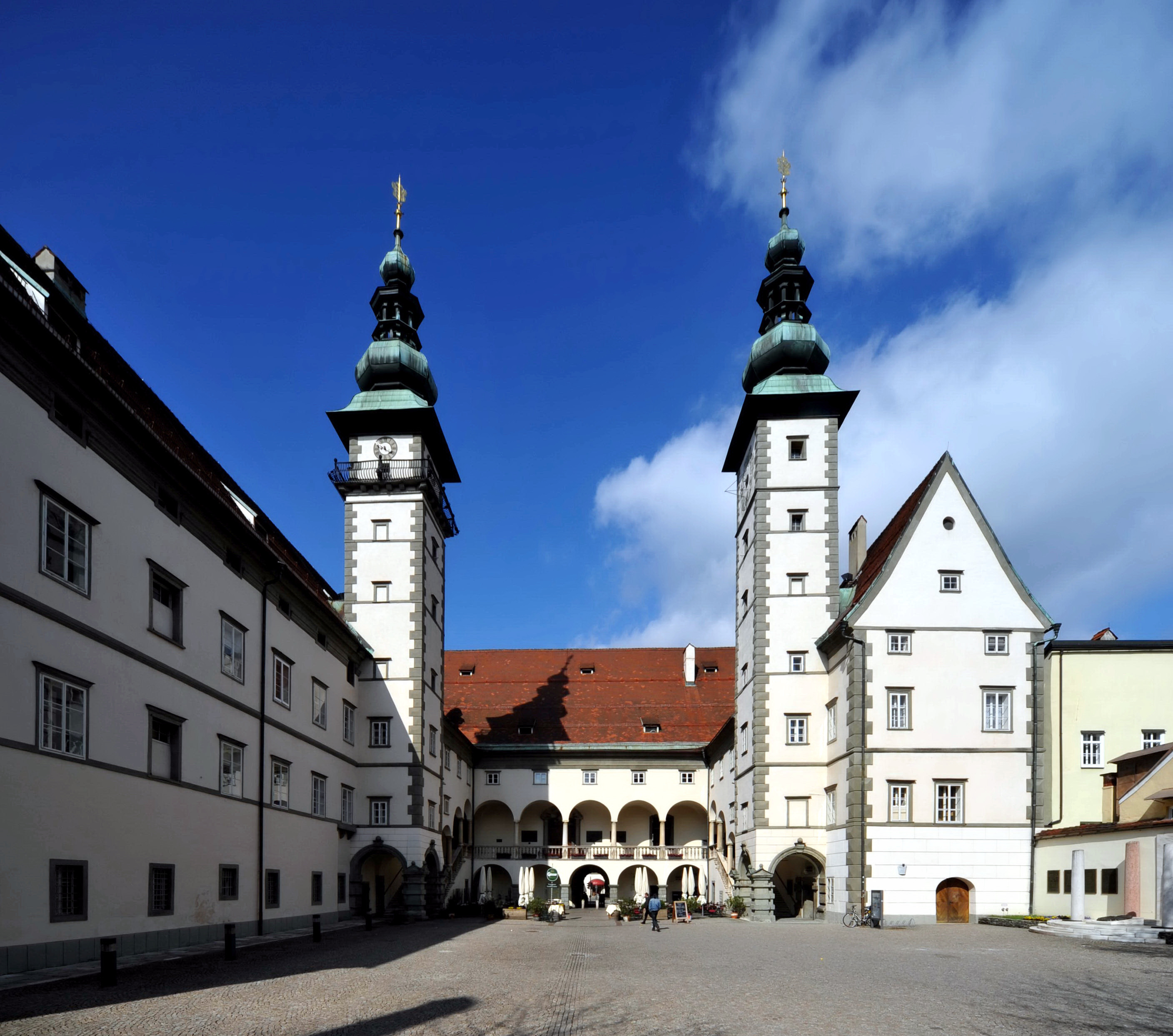
Landhaus yard in spring

The Landhaus Klagenfurt (lit. 'Klagenfurt Country House') situated between Heiligengeistplatz and Alter Platz at the edge of the oldest part of downtown Klagenfurt, Austria, is a historically significant secular building in the Carinthian capital. Constructed between 1574 and 1594 as part of the city's expansion and fortification efforts, it was commissioned by the Carinthian Landstand. Today, the Landhaus serves as the seat of the Carinthian state parliament and remains a symbol of Carinthian history and tradition.

== Historical background ==
During the late 15th and early 16th centuries, Carinthia was largely left to manage its affairs. The Habsburg princes, residing as emperors in Vienna or Prague, were often absent from the region. Consequently, the responsibility for addressing Ottoman incursions and internal uprisings fell to the Landstände, which represented the nobility and high clergy. In 1478, a peasant uprising in Carinthia arose in response to new taxes. Additional rebellions emerged from Carniola and southern Styria in 1515, leading to the occupation of Althofen and St. Vitus, which was the capital of Carinthia at the time.

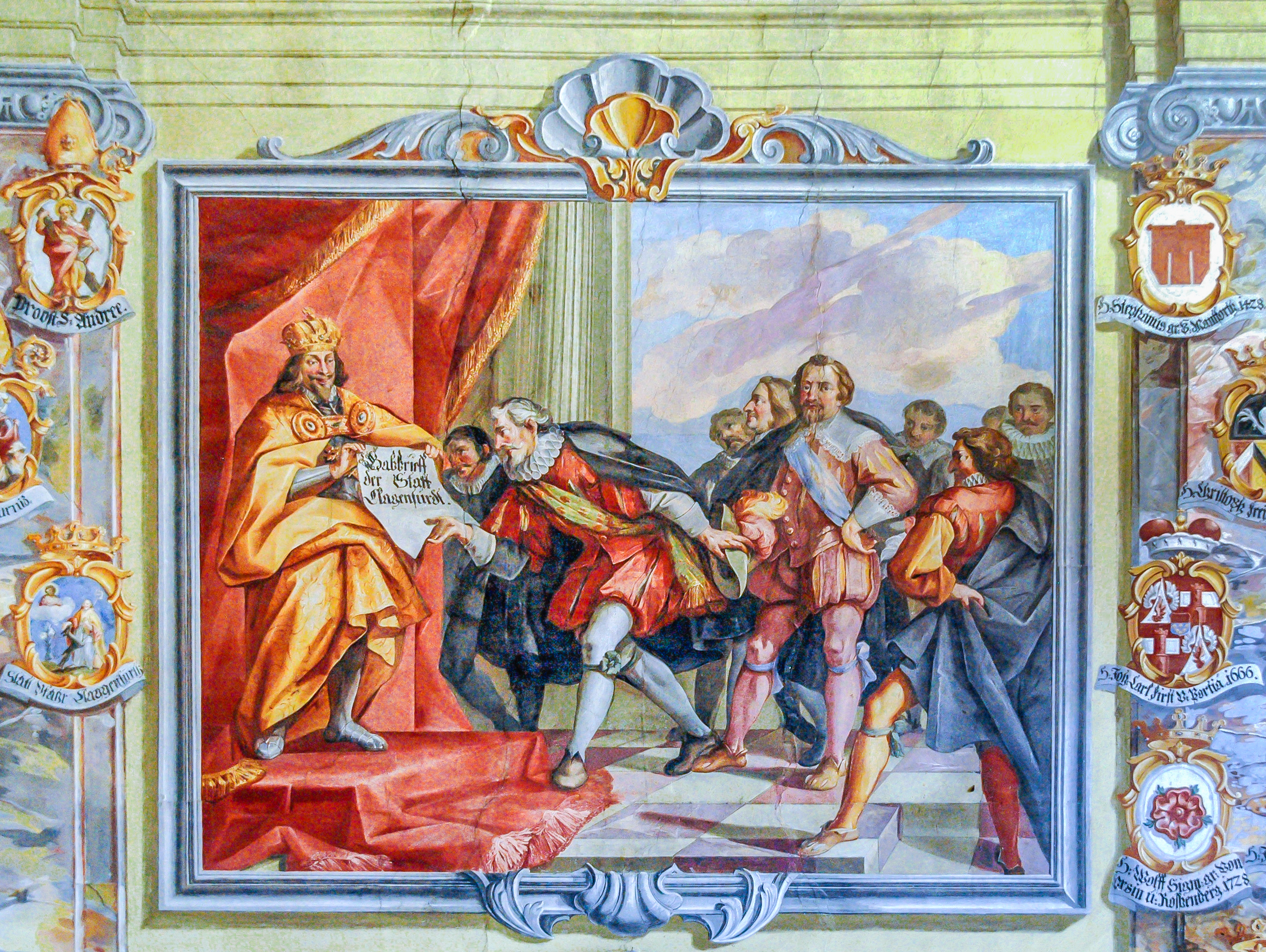
Emperor Maximilian presents the city of Klagenfurt to the Landstände. Fresco by JF Fromiller, Great Hall of Coats of Arms

Although the uprisings were initially suppressed through military intervention, they strengthened the resolve of the "honorable landscape" to establish a seat of power under their control rather than remaining subject to external rulers. They chose Klagenfurt, which had been severely damaged by a fire in 1514, and petitioned Emperor Maximilian I to transfer control of the city to them. Given that the imperial court and the city lacked the necessary funds for reconstruction, Maximilian granted ownership to the local nobility in 1518. Over the 16th century, the Landstände managed the reconstruction and fortification of the city, ultimately designating Klagenfurt as the new capital of Carinthia.

As early as 1527, the 4.5-kilometer-long Lend Canal was constructed to supply the city with water from Lake Wörthersee, to feed the city moat, which began excavation in 1534, and to serve as a transport route for building materials. The expansion of the city commenced in 1534. Within the newly erected city walls, construction took place south of the old city center, shaping the character of modern-day Klagenfurt. The Evangelical Preacher Church (later known as Klagenfurt Cathedral) was built in 1581, the Lindwurm Fountain was erected on Neuer Platz in 1593, and the Landhaus, constructed between 1574 and 1594, was established as the seat of the Landstände.

== History ==
=== Preceding buildings in the late Middle Ages ===
Klagenfurt, established at its current location in 1246, was granted city rights in 1252. However, during the late Middle Ages, the towns of St. Veit and Völkermarkt were more prominent as sovereign residences in Carinthia. Despite this, records indicate that a castle was built in Klagenfurt during the town's reconstruction period. Castellans of Klagenfurt are mentioned in 1258, and a document from Duke Ulrich III in 1268 refers to a castle. However, details about the size and location of this castle are sparse, though it is believed to have been situated at the western end of Alter Platz. Neither the Spanheimer dukes of the 13th century nor the Habsburg sovereigns, who acquired the Duchy of Carinthia in 1335, used the castle complex as a seat of power. While the Spanheimers resided in St. Veit, the Habsburgs did not establish a permanent residence in Klagenfurt.

In 1489, the citizens of Klagenfurt were gifted a new castle by the emperor. By this time, a second sovereign castle had already been built during the 15th century. The exact location of this second castle is not well documented, but it was situated near the older castle, with at least part of it occupying the area where the Landhaus now stands.

=== Construction of the Landhaus (1574–1594) ===
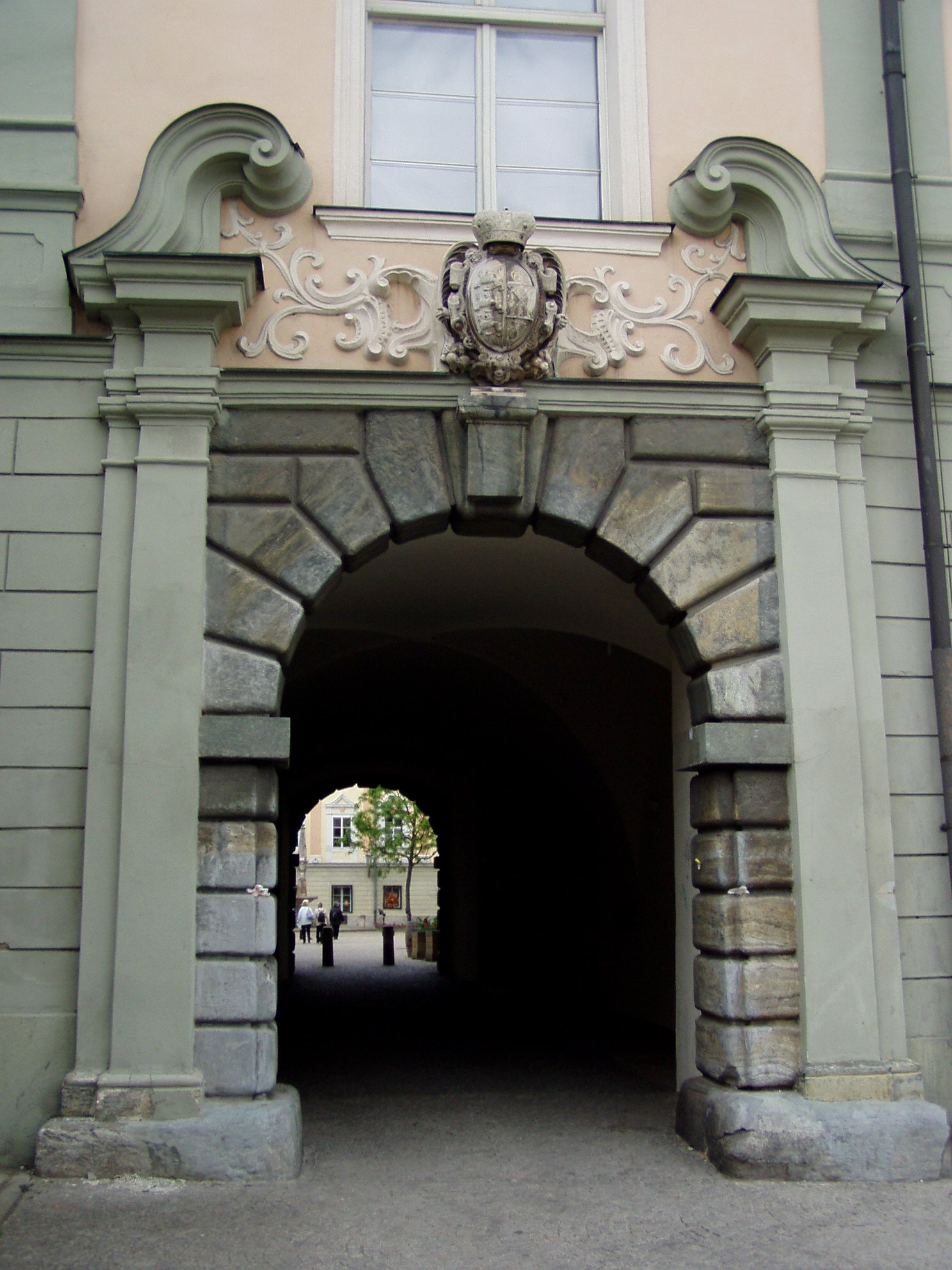
Gate in the west front

The Landhaus was intended to replace the old sovereign castle, which had been destroyed in a city fire in 1535 and had already become dilapidated prior to that. To prepare for the construction of the new building, the Landstände began the construction of an armory in 1518, the foundations of which can still be seen in the northeastern corner of the cellar. Ultimately, it was decided to build a new castle starting in 1574.

On March 3, 1574, Hans Freymann from Bleiburg, who served as the regional master builder and chief armorer, received instructions to construct the new castle and oversee the fortification of the entire city. The precise extent of his involvement in the planning and design of the complex remains unclear, and it is no longer possible to determine his specific contributions to the current structure. However, it is believed that he extended an older, square building located at the northwest corner of the Landhaus by adding a hook-shaped wing extending towards the south. This new section included a hall (now known as the Grosser Wappensaal) situated above the basement, the Landstube (currently utilized as a meeting room), and several additional rooms adjoining it to the east. These rooms roughly correspond to the present west and south wings of the building.

By the end of his tenure, the buildings had been completed to such an extent that artistic decoration could begin. After completing this first phase of construction by the end of 1580, the Landstände also acquired the so-called Paradeiserhaus in the immediate vicinity (now Landhaushof No. 3), which has since formed a structural and functional ensemble with the Landhaus.

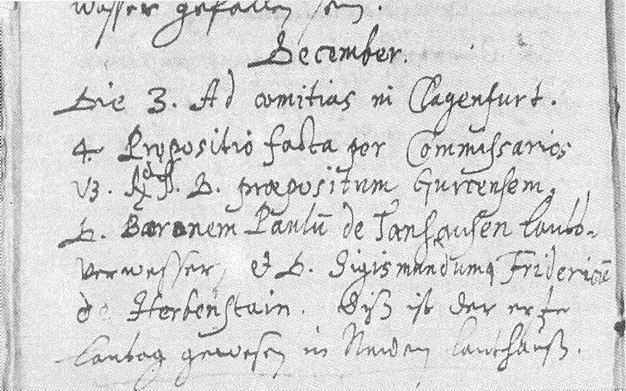
Note on the first session of the Diet on December 4, 1581

Freymann was replaced as master builder in 1581, though the reasons for his replacement are unclear. By the autumn of 1580, there is no further evidence of his activity, and he may have died during this period. His successor, Johann Anton Verda, who had previously worked as a stonemason at the Graz Landhaus, played a crucial role in shaping the exterior appearance of the Landhaus. Verda extended the building into a horseshoe shape, added the two-story arcade and accompanying flights of stairs, and constructed the southern tower. The Diet first convened in the Landhaus on December 4, 1581, although the building had already been substantially completed by that time. The final construction element, the Landhaus courtyard gate, which separated the courtyard between the Landhaus and the adjacent building complex "Zur goldenen Gans," was completed in 1594.

Inside, the Great Coat of Arms Hall had been completed in 1578 by the Villach landscape painter Anton Blumenthal, who shortly thereafter contributed 47 portraits of Carinthian princes. Between 1587 and 1588, the building was further completed under the leadership of Christoph Windisch, with significant contributions from the sculptor Ulrich Vogelsang.

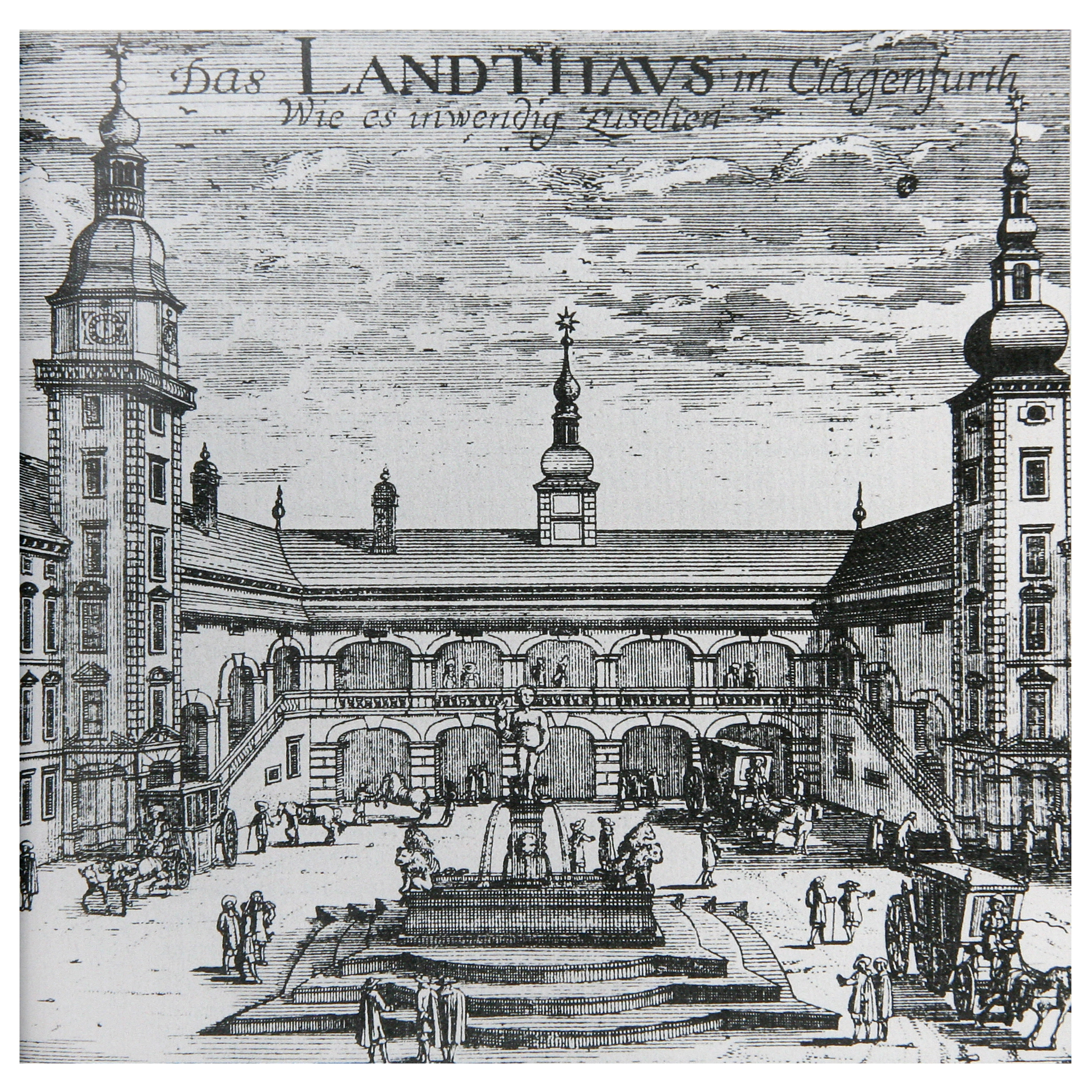
Engraving by Valvasor, 1688

The completed Landhaus is depicted in a contemporary account by Urban Paumgartner, a teacher at the Protestant landscape school "Collegium sapientiae et pietatis" in Klagenfurt. While in exile in Lauingen in 1605, Paumgartner composed the epic Aristeion Carinthiae Claudiforum, consisting of 1,000 Latin hexameters. This work describes the newly built city of Klagenfurt in 18 sections and includes a city map, among other illustrations. The Aristeion provides insights about the country house, stating:

I now want to describe the country house, it looks wonderful

By two towers rising to thinner airs

Look down at the entrance with the gates open twice.

Adorned with the art of appeal shines the panel,

and the screed of the hall shimmers with dug fields

marble, the princes shine painted in golden ceilings

Austria, like the estates of these heroes, the capital

Received as a gift and confess with a grateful heart, That they owe to them every reward for virtue. [...]

Now the ground floor, supported on mighty pillars,

Allow me to explore, hidden inside

Brave Marvor's ore-guns rest.

Steel that conquers diamond in hardness, and wings of iron

Form the gate, it glares all around from mighty weapons. [...]

=== Use and importance from the year 1581 ===
The construction of the city fortifications in 1591 and the completion of the Landhaus in 1594 marked a significant turning point for Klagenfurt, transforming it into a major residence for the Landstände, both structurally and politically. The finalization of the Landhaus coincided with the establishment of a Carinthian provincial table in 1591, which redefined the composition of the Landstände and led to the formation of provincial authorities.

The Landhaus served multiple functions. Primarily, it was the meeting place for the Landstände and their committees. Additionally, it hosted the interrogations of provincial governors and the "Landschrannengericht" (provincial law and court proceedings). The building also functioned as a venue for ceremonies; one of the first notable events was a banquet for Archduke Ferdinand II on January 27, 1597, following his hereditary homage. Urban Paumgartner reported on dances held by the Landstände, and the Landhaus became a popular location for wedding receptions for members of the Landstände. The mint of St. Vitus, which had been leased in 1529, was also moved to the new capital. However, the Landstände lost their right to mint coins in 1622 and were required to vacate the mint adjacent to the Landhaus. Shortly after its completion, parts of the Landhaus were rented out for various uses, including as storage rooms for grain.

The Counter-Reformation brought about the re-Catholicization of Carinthian towns, especially Klagenfurt (in 1600 and 1604). The expulsion of Protestant nobility in 1628 led to the consolidation of provincial centralism, and the activities of the provincial parliament were subsequently restricted to affirming provincial demands.

=== Fire and redesign from 1723 ===
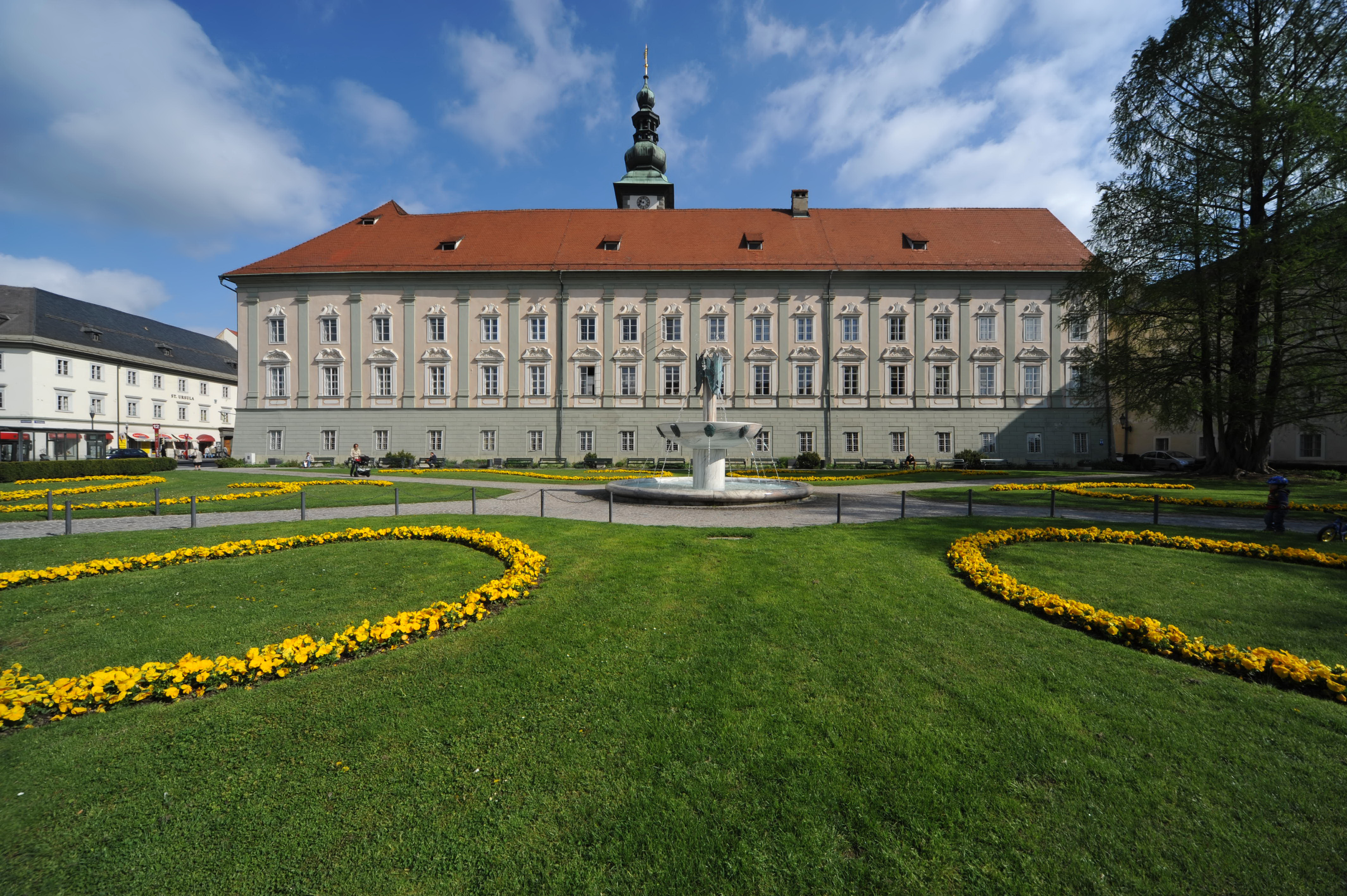
The late baroque southern front

On August 16, 1723, a catastrophic fire struck Klagenfurt, inflicting severe damage on the Landhaus. In the years following this disaster, the building was extensively renovated in the late Baroque style. The south and west façades were embellished with giant pilasters and stucco-decorated window frames. The south tower was fitted with two new bells in 1724, which survived both World Wars. In 1735, Ferdinand Fromiller was commissioned to redesign the Great Hall of Arms, which continued to serve as the central venue for the Carinthian Landstände until 1848. Fromiller's renovations included the installation of a marble floor with a three-color geometric pattern, the addition of a new main portal, and two fireplaces. He also painted the coats of arms of the burgraves, councilors, and other officials in the Small Hall of Arms, which was used as the council chamber for the councilors.

=== Use in the 18th and 19th centuries ===
The Landhaus, particularly its Great Hall of Arms, was a focal point for festivities in the late 18th century, hosting notable events such as the visit of Amalia of Parma in June 1783 and Archduke Ferdinand of Milan in 1786.

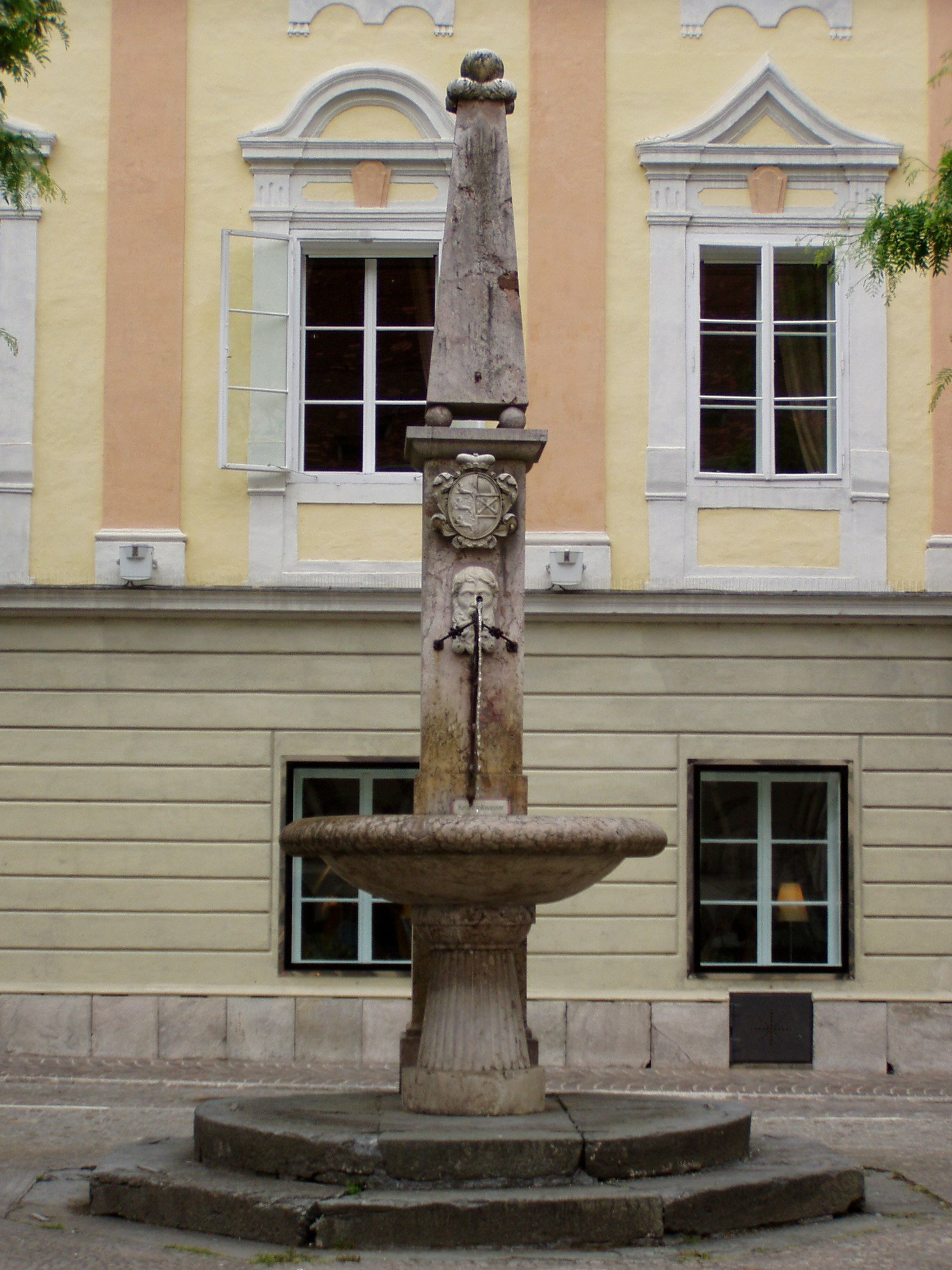
The obelisk fountain erected in 1833 in the country house courtyard

The Napoleonic Wars marked a significant shift in the building's use. The armory of the Landstände was discontinued, though rooms later served as storage for Landwehr weapons. During the French occupation of Klagenfurt in 1809 and 1810, the Landhaus was repurposed as a military hospital, sustaining considerable structural damage in the process.

In 1818, a bust of Emperor Franz I was installed in the Large Hall of Coats of Arms but was replaced by the Fürstenstein in 1870. Another significant addition was the obelisk fountain, created by Christophoro Cragnolini in 1833 for the Landhaushof at a cost of 600 guilders. The fountain remains in place today. Additionally, in 1843, the garden of the Landhaus, formerly a vegetable garden, was redesigned into a park, with its surrounding walls removed as part of this renovation.

From 1843 to 1883, the Landhaus also housed the state museum, which later moved to the Rudolfinum, now known as the Carinthian State Museum. The Historical Association's Museum began operating within the Landhaus in 1844, followed by the Natural History Museum in 1861. A monument hall, located in front of the north wing, displayed various significant exhibits but was dismantled in 1882 during a renovation of the Landhaushof.

In 1896, the state mortgage bank established its offices on the ground floor of the Landhaus, where it remained for three years. By 1914, the building housed several governmental institutions, including the offices of the state parliament and state committee, the state building authority, the state accounting department, and the state treasury.

=== First Republic ===
In 1926, a cellar was established in the Landhaus following a government decision. The cellar was adorned with murals created by local Carinthian artists, including Eduard Manhart's "Ankogel," Switbert Lobisser's "Kirchgang," "Keusche am Berg," and "Kärntnerhimmel," Josef Prokop's "Schimmelreiten im Gurktal," and Richard Knaus's "Stern- oder Dreikönigssingen in Paternion" and "Bandltanz." Unfortunately, all of the paintings except Lobisser's “Carinthian Sky” were lost in a fire in 1949 and during renovations in 1969.

In 1924 and 1925, a tender was announced for the decoration of the meeting hall with a theme related to the 1920 referendum. Switbert Lobisser won the commission and, in 1928, painted a fresco on the north side of the hall reflecting the spirit of the Heimatschutz movement.

In 1929, Anton Kolig was commissioned to design the Kolig Hall, named in his honor. Between October 1929 and October 1930, Kolig and his students, including Anton Mahringer, painted frescoes in the hall with financial support from the state of Hesse-Nassau. The frescoes were intended to symbolize the fraternization between Austria and Germany, depicting themes of military life, crafts, hospitality, and patriarchal order, which were considered contemporary at the time.

The frescoes were executed using colored mortar with overpainting in wax casein colors. They deliberately avoided creating an illusion of three-dimensional space and were intentionally left with an unfinished appearance. The figures, though larger-than-life, appeared somewhat unnatural in the relatively small space. During the progress of the work, there was significant dissatisfaction, particularly from the Christian Social Party, and some images faced strong criticism.

Despite the objections, Otto Demus from the Office for the Protection of Monuments and Social-Democratic provincial councilor Zeinitzer defended the frescoes. However, in November 1930, members of the National Socialists and the Heimatblock demanded the removal of the frescoes. On March 25, 1931, the state parliament narrowly voted against removing the frescoes, with a vote of 17 to 16. Emmerich Angerer from the Heimatblock remarked, "A people who have fought for their freedom, a people who have sealed their true love of their homeland with their blood, cannot tolerate that even for one or two more days these frescoes, which really offend the people, are exposed to the public."

=== The Era of National Socialism ===
The frescoes in the Landhaus, created before Austria's annexation to the German Reich, faced significant threats after the rise of the National Socialists. On October 12, 1938, provincial curator Walter Frodl reported that he could not ensure the safety of the frescoes due to widespread demands for their removal. During renovations in the winter of 1938/39, the frescoes were demolished. While the exact author and date of the demolition remain unknown, it is believed to have occurred between November 1938 and February 1939.

In the summer of 1938, Switbert Lobisser was commissioned by Minister of the Interior Wilhelm Frick to paint new frescoes in the conference hall for 10,000 Reichsmark, entitled "Carinthia's Homecoming into the Reich". Concurrently, the Landhaus received a new façade with Terranova spray plaster in ivory, rust red, and grey. The north tower was adorned with a sundial fresco by Otto Bestereimer and Kurt Weiss, featuring the zodiac, runes for life and death, and the motto “Es sollen die Schlechten die Guten nit knechten”, an allusion to the time of illegality.

Following these renovations, the Landhaus became the headquarters of the Gauleitung of Carinthia in early 1940, with the Koligsaal serving as the office of Gauleiter Friedrich Rainer.

Although the building survived World War II without direct bomb hits, its façade and roof suffered severe damage.

On May 1, 1945, the Landhaus played a pivotal role in the restoration of democracy in Carinthia. Before the arrival of British troops, democratic parties seized control of the Landtag. On May 5, Gauhauptmann Natmeßnig and democratic representatives convened in the Landhaus, forming an enforcement committee that moved to adjacent Tabakamt buildings. By the evening of May 7, the provisional provincial government was established in the small armorial hall, marking a key moment in the reinstatement of democracy in Carinthia. To commemorate this historic event, a plaque was installed in the Landhaus in 1985, inscribed with: "In this building / Carinthian / patriots restored / democracy / in the country by / their own efforts on 7 May / 1945."

=== Second Republic ===
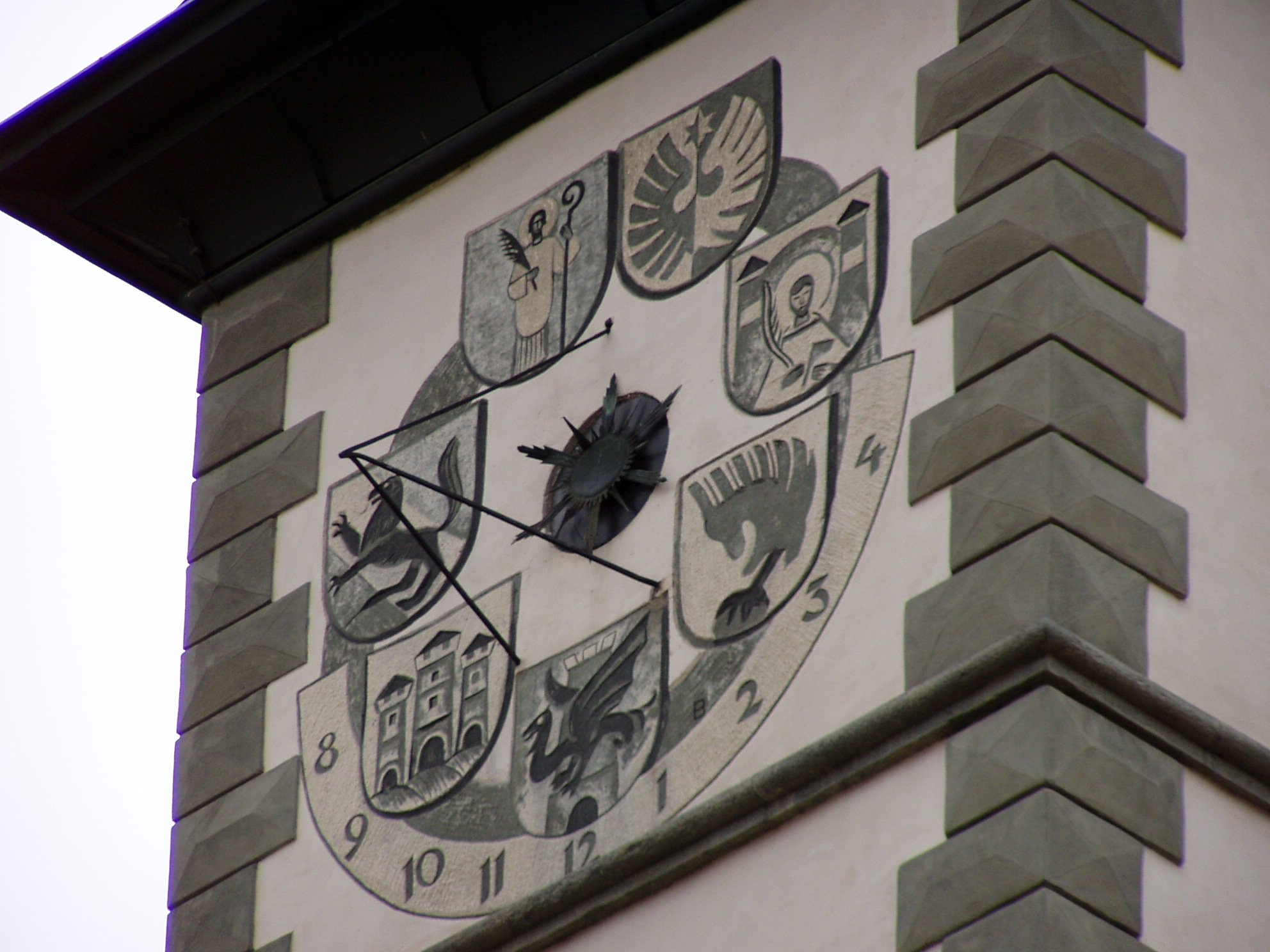
Sundial on the north tower by Werner Lösser

After the conclusion of the Second World War, the Landhaus was seized by the British occupying forces, who had previously covered the Lobisser frescoes painted in 1938. It was not until July 22, 1948, that the Landtag could reconvene in the conference hall.

Between 1964 and 1976, extensive renovations were carried out on the Landhaus. The roof and façades, which had been only temporarily repaired after 1945, were fully restored. The inner courtyard façade was redesigned in a Renaissance style, featuring grey and white colors. In 1967, Karl Bauer created a new sundial on the north tower, rendered in sgraffito with the coats of arms of the seven district capitals of the time. The meeting hall was refurbished in 1970, including the installation of a visitors' gallery and a 350-kilogram bronze coat of arms of Carinthia by Werner Lösser. Anton Kolig's oil paintings were hung in the Kolig Hall, and the Great Coat of Arms Hall underwent restoration in 1975 and 1976.

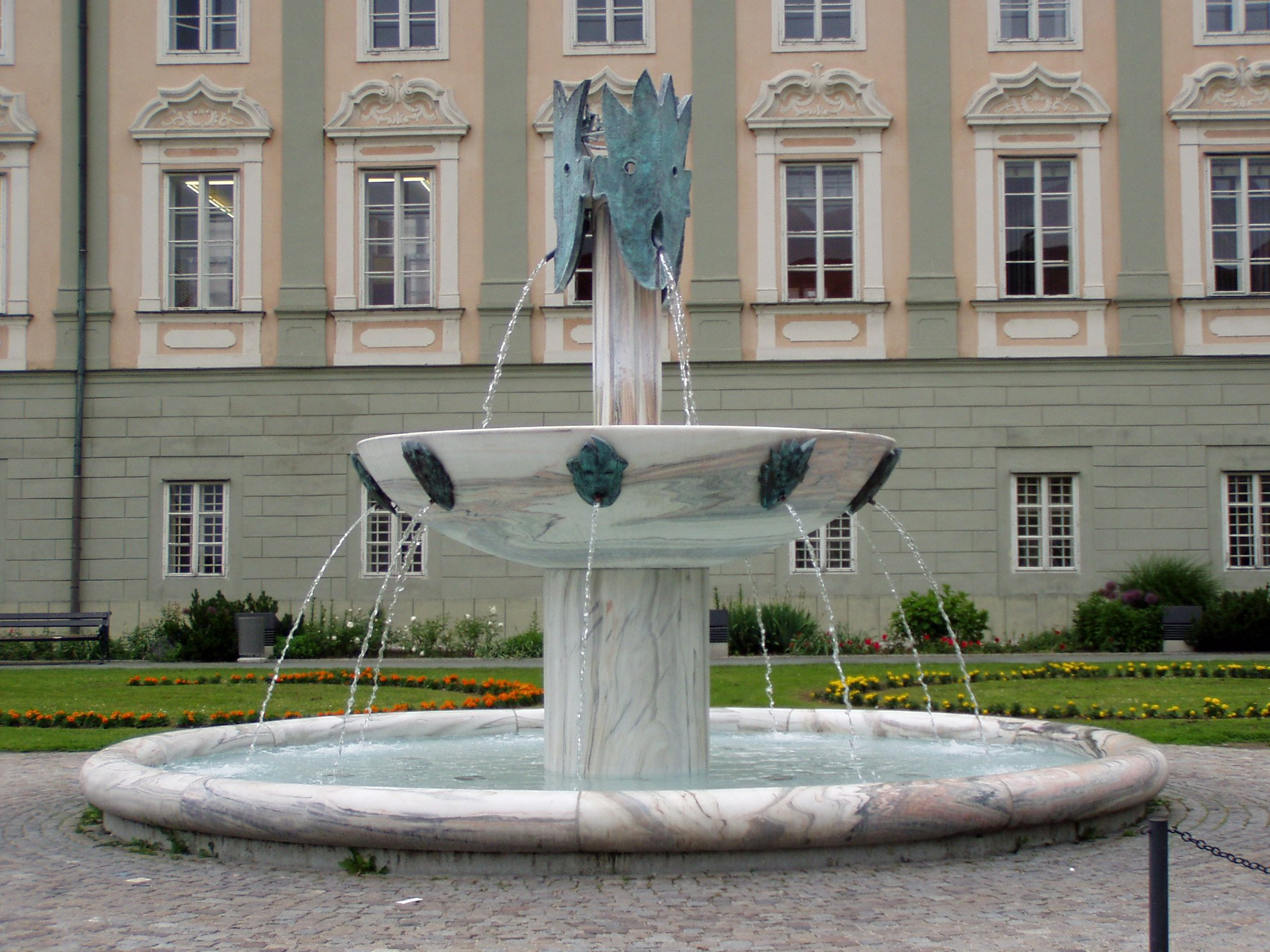
Kiki Kogelnik fountain in the country house park, built in 1997

In 1997, the Provincial Archives moved to a new location on St. Ruprechter Straße, leading to another round of renovations and redesigns for the Landhaus. The conference hall was updated with new seating, and the bronze coat of arms was replaced with a modern Carinthian graphic. During these renovations, the previously covered Nazi frescoes were uncovered. After some debate, these frescoes were removed and conserved.

In the autumn of 1996, the state parliament requested a new design project for the Kolig Hall. The cultural committee and the advisory board for fine arts supported Cornelius Kolig, grandson of Anton Kolig, due to his possession of his grandfather's documents and his status as an "ostracised artist." Dr. Michael Ausserwinkler, the deputy provincial governor responsible for culture at the time, endorsed this proposal, emphasizing the importance of confronting the darker aspects of Carinthia's past. However, this decision faced opposition. The Kärntner Krone, a regional newspaper, criticized the decision with headlines such as: "Faecal artist to collect millions: Stop cultural scandal in Carinthia!"

At the instigation of the FPÖ, the Cultural Committee decided on 17 March 1998 to invite tenders for the design of the space. The five-member international jury was nominated by the parties in the provincial parliament, and the parties agreed to accept the jury's vote. On 2 July 1998, Cornelius Kolig was unanimously announced as the winner by the jury from among the 19 participants. On 7 July the provincial government decided to award the contract to Kolig with the votes of the ÖVP and SPÖ: "The result does not fit the FPÖ's political worldview. However, we will not let Carinthia become the Punch and Judy of a united Europe." If critics had initially taken offense at the way the contract was awarded, the campaign by the Kärntner Krone and the FPÖ against Cornelius Kolig continued even after the tender they had called for.

Construction work on the Kolig Hall began in August 1998, while the FPÖ mobilized against the project, collecting signatures and distributing controversial leaflets. The Klagenfurt Regional Court intervened, banning the distribution of these leaflets.

Kolig completed the design of the room, incorporating elements such as the lettering "TAT ORT," referencing its previous use as Friedrich Rainer's office. The hall was presented to the public on September 25, 1998. Despite the controversy, the hall has since become a notable attraction.

== Building Specification ==
=== Exterior architecture ===
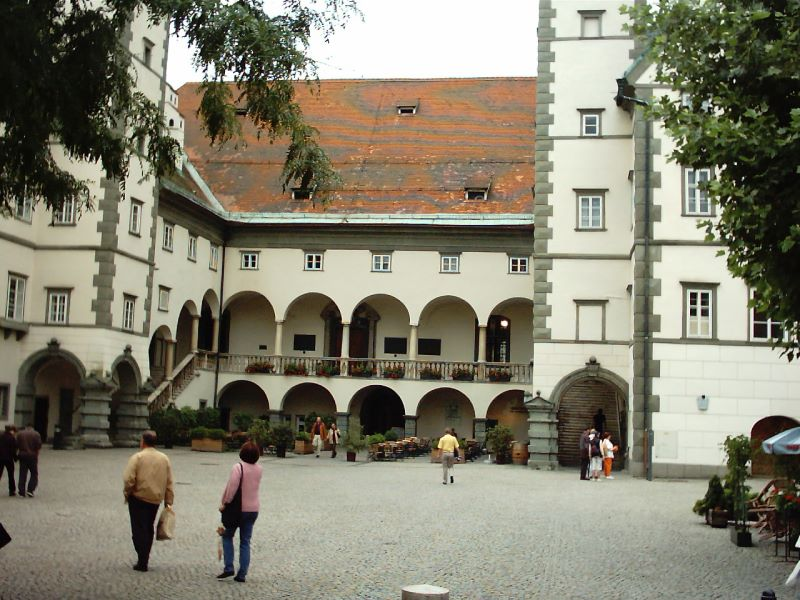
The Landhaushof in 2004

Although originally planned as a castle, the Landhaus today presents a more castle-like appearance due to its horseshoe-shaped ground plan. The building is particularly impressive and imposing on the west and south sides. Of the original two rustic portals on the west side, one has been bricked up. The remaining portal provides access to the courtyard, which features wide staircases on the north and south sides that lead up to the arcade and the Great Hall of Heraldry. The courtyard prominently displays chlorite slate stone from the nearby Kreuzbergl, a material also seen in other local landmarks such as the Lindwurm fountain.

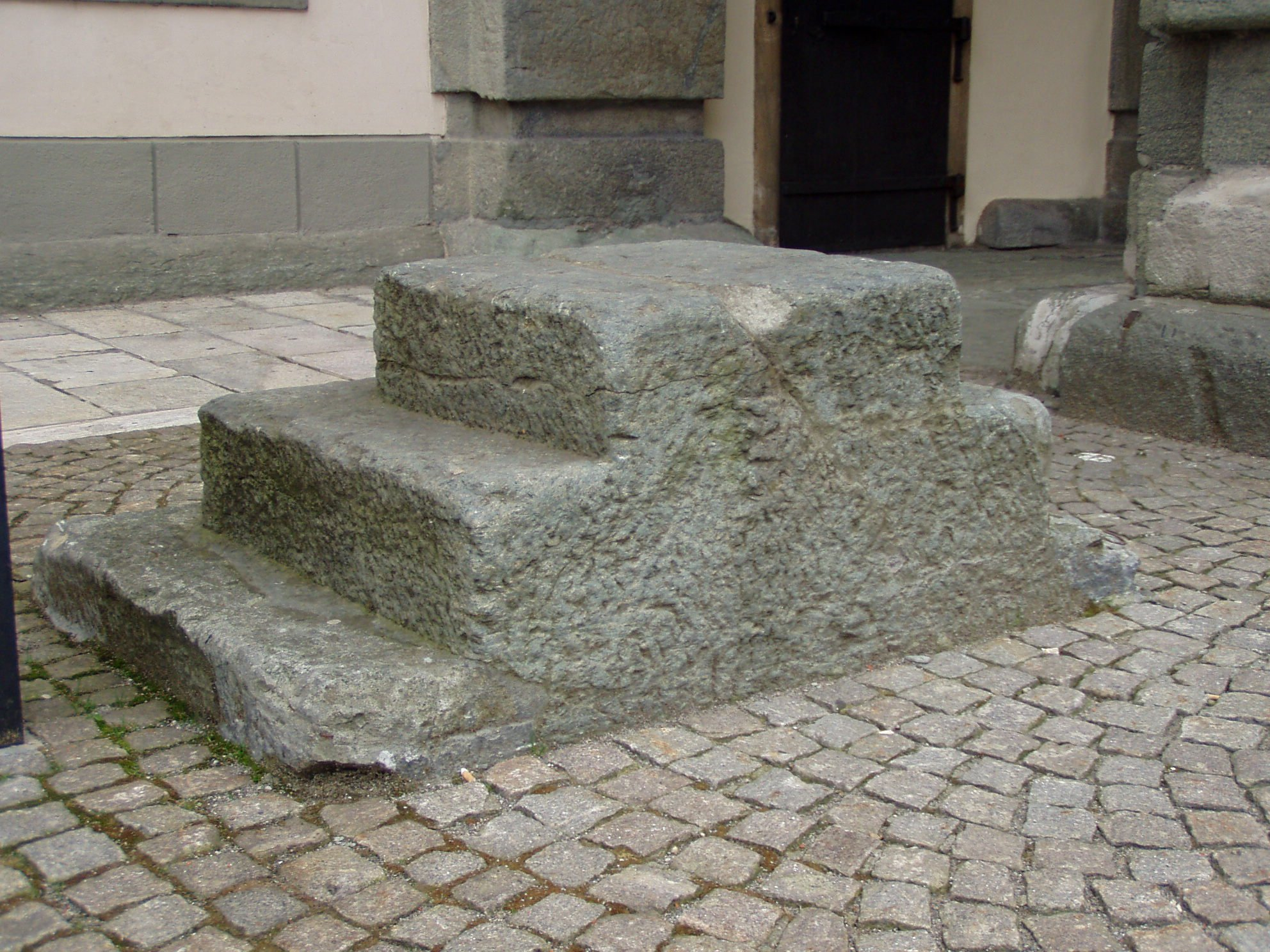
The stone staircase in front of the south tower

The building deviates from classical architectural rules; for instance, the portal is not centrally located on the west side, and the entrance to the coat of arms hall is similarly off-center. The towers exhibit different designs, and the arcades of the staircases do not align with the tower walls. This lack of adherence to classical norms contributes to the building's unique charm, which led Wilhelm Pinder to describe the Landhaus as one of the most impressive post-medieval urban structures in the German-speaking world.

A notable feature in the Landhaushof is a small stone staircase, originally intended to assist riders in mounting horses, which has been preserved. In 1998, a controversial monument titled "Site of Carinthian Unity" was installed in the Landhaushof. Additionally, in the park south of the Landhaus, a fountain designed by Kiki Kogelnik called Der Gesang, can be found.

=== Interior design ===
==== The Great Hall of Coats of Arms ====
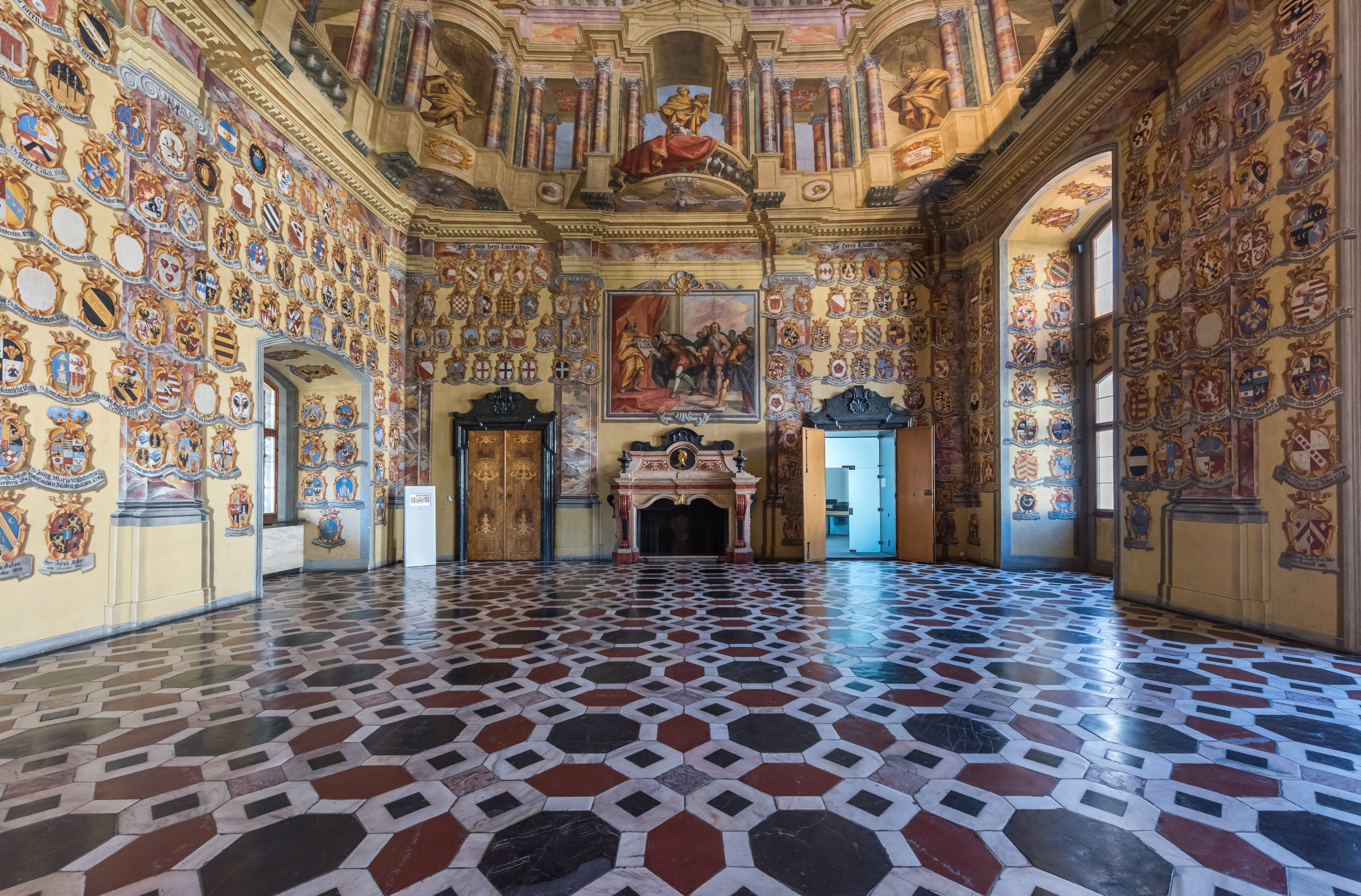
Great Hall of Coats of Arms

The Great Armorial Hall, situated on the first floor of the west wing of the Landhaus, is an impressive space that spans both upper floors, standing 9.8 meters high. With a floor area of 23 × 13 meters, its dimensions have remained unchanged since its completion in 1581. Originally adorned with frescoes and a ceiling painting by Anton Blumenthal, these were lost in a fire in 1723. The hall was then redesigned by Josef Ferdinand Fromiller, who is responsible for its current appearance.

The ceiling features a fresco by Fromiller framed by elaborate mock architecture designed with perspective in mind. The surrounding portico includes niches with Grisailla statues of the Habsburg rulers Matthias, Ferdinand II, III, and IV. Instead of a celestial depiction, the fresco portrays the hereditary homage of Emperor Charles VI, which took place on August 22, 1728, in the Palais Rosenberg (now the town hall of Klagenfurt). The emperor is depicted under a red canopy, surrounded by deputies, ecclesiastical dignitaries, the duke's farmer, and holders of eleven provincial offices. The coats of arms of these figures, along with those of Austria, Carinthia, and the ecclesiastical territories of Salzburg and Bamberg, are integrated into the design.

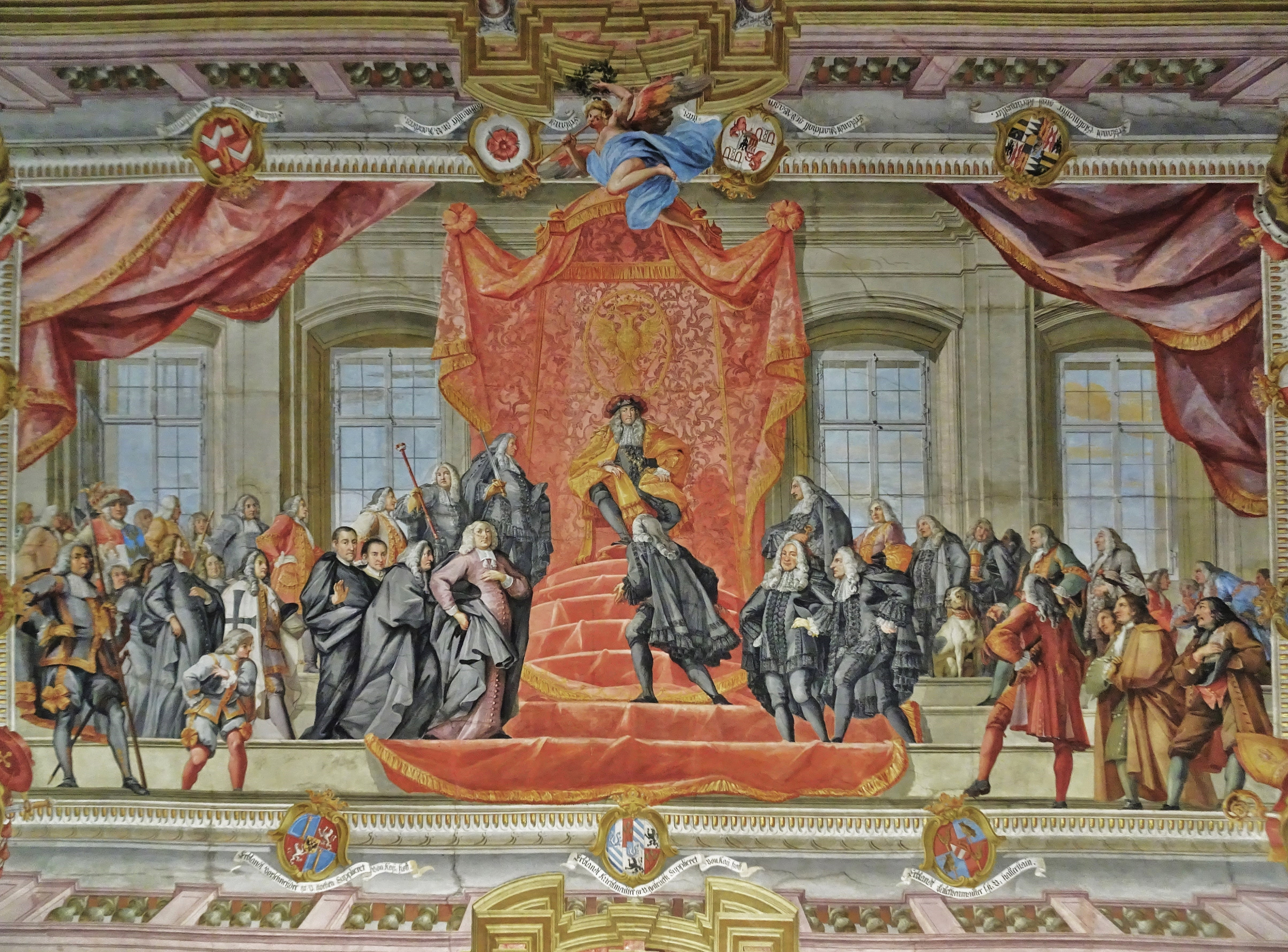
The ceiling fresco in the Great Coat of Arms Hall

On the north wall, a fresco framed as a panel painting from 1740 illustrates the investiture of the Carinthian duke at Fürstenstein near Karnburg. The south wall features a fresco depicting the handing over of the Gabbrief (deed of donation) by Maximilian I to the Carinthian Landstände on April 24, 1518, marking Klagenfurt's designation as a provincial city. These frescoes emphasize the Carinthian Landstände's historical significance and regional pride.

The hall is richly decorated with 650 coats of arms, including those on the ceiling, bringing the total to 665. The coats of arms of the nobility and knights are painted on the long sides. In the two uppermost rows, in alphabetical order, are the families that were members of the Landständisch before 1591, and below them, in chronological order, the newly admitted families, ending with Count Hugo Henckel-Donnersmarck in 1847. Nineteen fields remain empty due to unidentified coats of arms from the Baroque period. The south side shows the coats of arms of the ecclesiastical Landstände on the left and provincial governors on the right, ending with Leopold von Aichelburg-Labia (1909–1918). The north side features the coats of arms of the Landesvizedome (provincial administrators of property) on the left and Landesverweser (deputies of the provincial governor) on the right, both of which existed only until 1747.

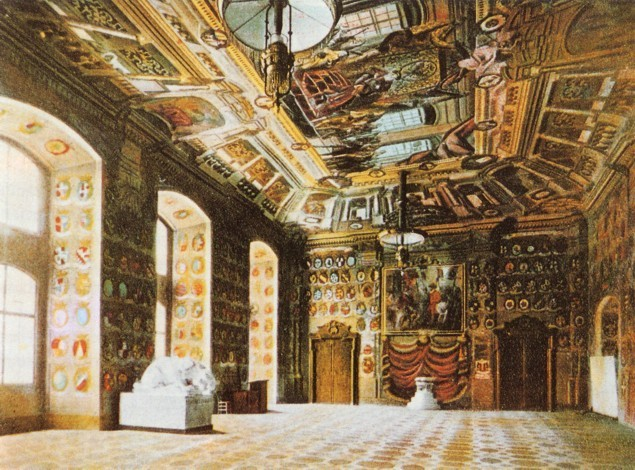
Great Hall of Coats of Arms, 1904

The marble floor, in white, red, and black, as well as the door frames and southern fireplace, were crafted by the Venetian artist Francesco Robba. The northern fireplace was reconstructed in 1908 by Pietro d'Aronco from Gemona. Since March 2006, the prince's stone has been placed in front of this fireplace once again.

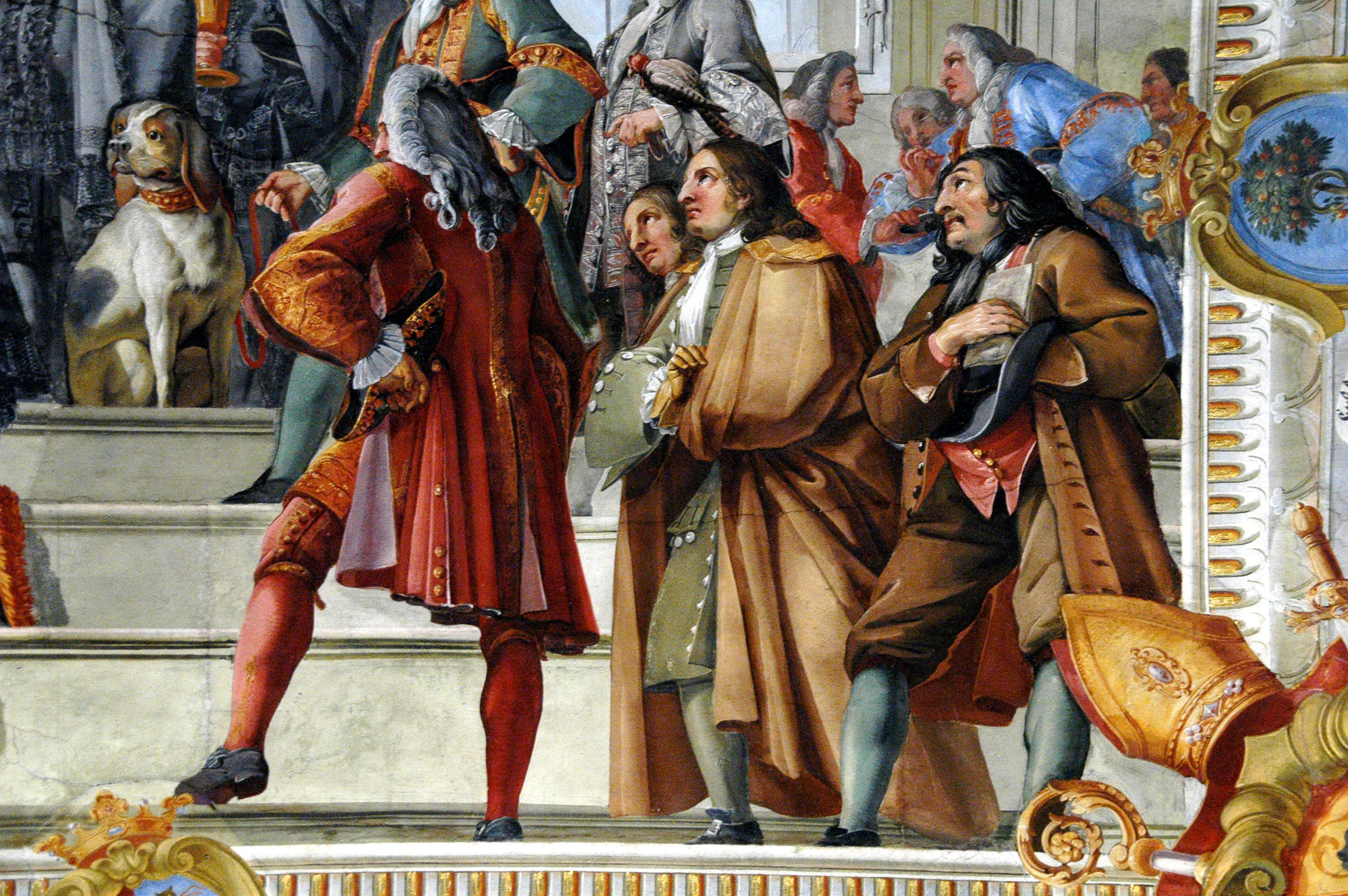
Fromiller and Sons as a self-perpetuation in the lower right corner of the ceiling fresco in the large coat of arms hall

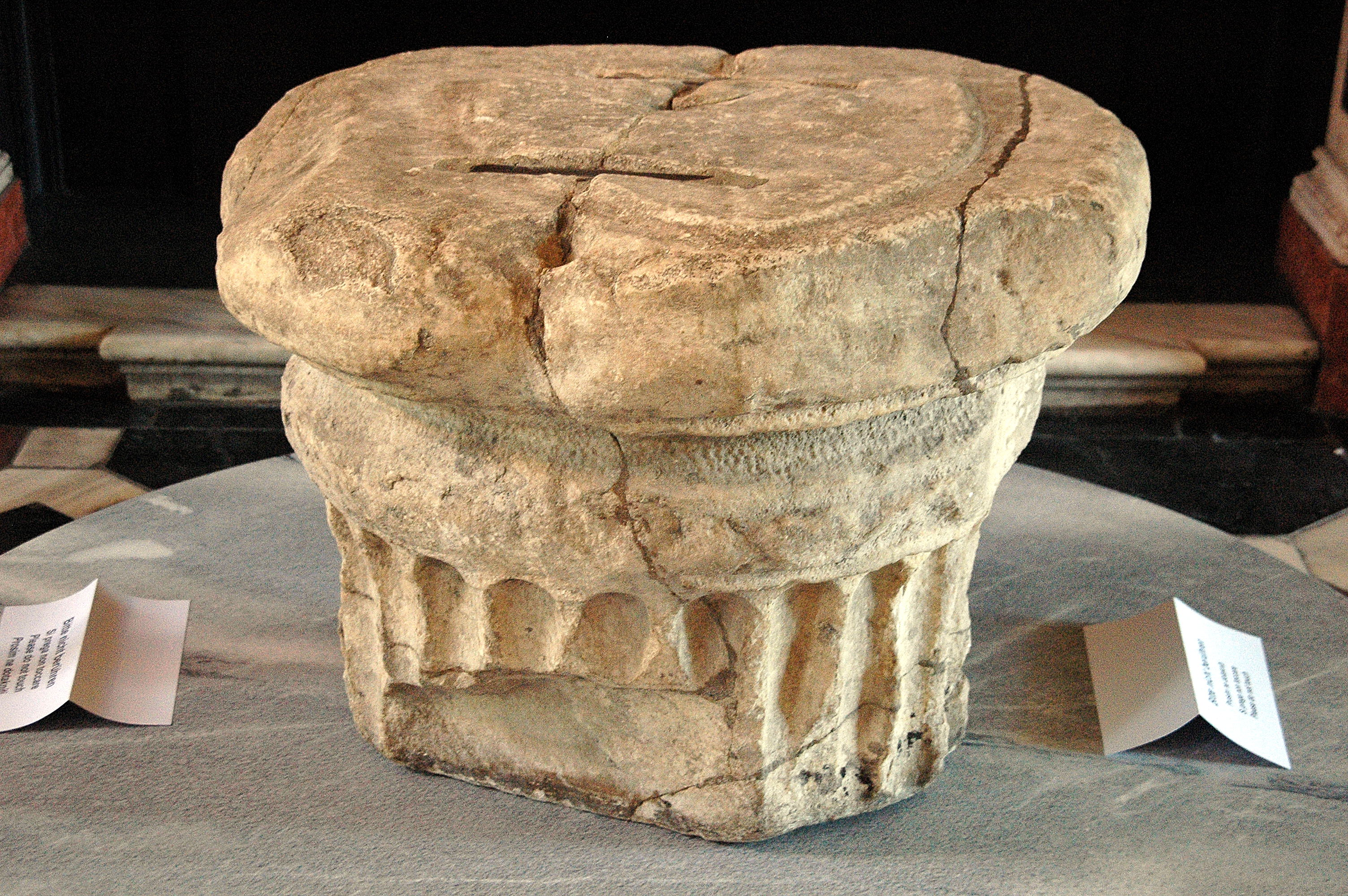
"Princely Stone" exhibited in the Great Hall of Coats of Arms (since 2006)

==== Small Hall of Coats of Arms ====
The Small Hall of Arms, formerly known as the Ratsstube (Council Chamber), is a historically significant room within the Landhaus where meetings of the Board of Deputies—predecessors of the state government—took place during the Estates Period. The room measures 10 × 6.5 meters and is characterized by its deep-niched windows on the north and south sides. The hall was designed by Fromiller in 1740. Here the walls show 298 coats of arms of the burgraves, general collectors, provincial presidents, councilors, and the last noble provincial governors of Carinthia. The flat ceiling shows mock architecture and an allegorical fresco "Veritas temporis filia" ("Truth as the Daughter of Time").

==== Boardroom ====
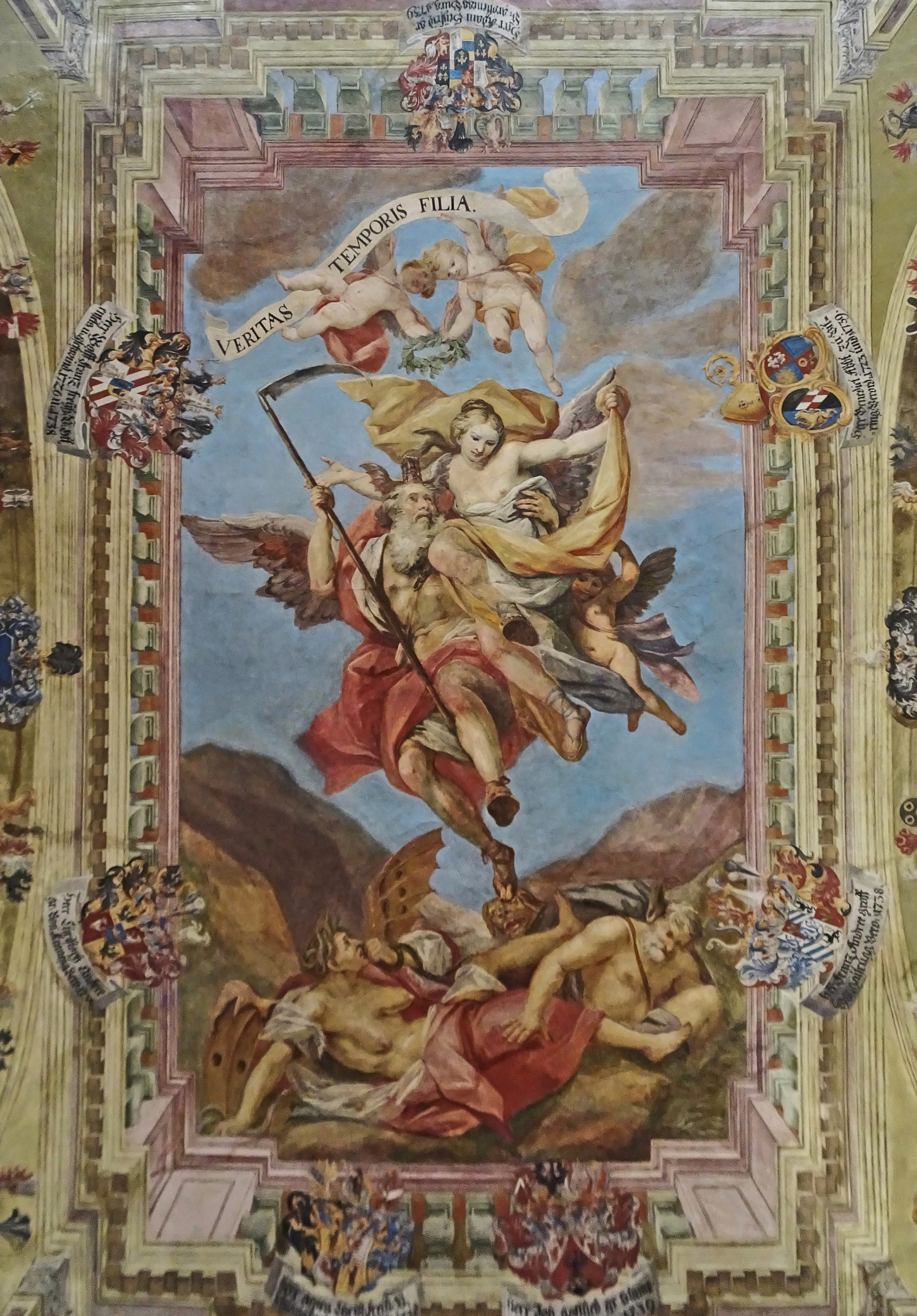
Fromiller's ceiling painting in the small coat of arms hall

The meeting room, originally called the Landstube, was used as a meeting room from the beginning. The room comprises 4 × 2 window axes and measures around 18 × 9 meters. Since 1927, it has extended over two stories. Lobisser's frescoes from 1928 on the north wall, which are still preserved today, bear the following titles from left to right:

- "Auszug zum (Abwehr)Kampf" ("Exit for [defensive] combat");
- "Verbrüderung (Agitation)" ("Fraternity [Agitation]");
- "(Jubel nach der) Volksabstimmung“ ("[Cheering after the] referendum");

The frescoes painted by Lobisser in 1938 were covered in 1945. The east side was destroyed in 1970 when the visitors' gallery was built, and the other frescoes were removed in 2000.

They showed the following scenes:

- "Zeit der Illegalität“ ("Time of illegality"): Located on the east side, it shows a mother with three children standing in front of a prison wall;
- "Erwartung" ("Expectation"): Located on the south wall, adjacent to the previous image, it depicts a student with a swastika in a book, a mother holding her child, and other waiting figures;
- "Stunde der Befreiung" ("Hour of liberation"): A German and an Austrian soldier shake hands;
- "Die Botschaft auf dem Lande" ("The message in the country"): A cyclist waving a swastika flag brings the news of the connection to the farmers;
- "Illegaler Kämpfer" ("Illegal Combatant"): Depicts a fighter with a bandaged head, but standing upright, located in the southwest corner;
- "Sozialismus der Tat" ("Socialism of action"): Shows a woman from the Old Reich distributing gifts to Austrian children, located on the west side;
- "Treueschwur" ("Oath of allegiance"): Features Carinthians in traditional dress giving a Nazi salute around a swastika emblem.

==== Koligsaal ====
The hall was originally 9 × 7 meters but was made smaller by the installation of sanitary facilities on the north side.

Anton Kolig designed the hall in 1929 and 1930 with his students, including Anton Mahringer, Karl Bertsch, and Karl Kraus. The paintings were destroyed in 1938. Only Kolig's sketches and black-and-white photos have survived to this day. Otto Demus described the paintings in detail in 1930. Little is known about the frescoes' color scheme, but the room's ceiling frescoes' color scheme, but the room's ceiling was rust green, and the floor was brick red.

- East Wall: Featured youths, identifiable as Kolig's students, carrying beams to build a workshop. A central figure, a naked woman, handed Anton Mahringer an egg, symbolizing fertility and love. A separate scene depicted Anton Kolig in front of a painting of the "Madonna and Child," receiving a bowl of paints from a student.
- North Wall: Showed a banquet scene reminiscent of the Last Supper, with identifiable figures including Kolig, Anton Mahringer, Josef Friedrich Perkonig, and Alois Maier-Kaibitsch.
- West Wall: On the left, three boys sang outdoors; to the right, two lovers were shown, with one man presenting a pearl necklace to his lover. The maid's room featured three undressing women, one of whom was pregnant, echoing classical motifs like the Three Graces or the Judgment of Paris.
- South Wall: Included a Hessian peasant couple mourning over an open children's coffin, honoring the donor state of Hesse-Nassau. The central pillar depicted a "Looking up figure and floating genius", with the inscription: "Hessen-Nassau / Carinthia / Werkst. Kolig". Window jambs featured four soldier figures symbolizing Carinthian defensive struggles.

Cornelius Kolig combined elements of his grandfather with new elements in his design of the Kolig Hall in 1998. Anton Kolig's paintings Gastmahl ("Banquet"), Mägdekammer ("Chamber of Maids"), and the singers with the lovers were installed as large-scale, monochrome reproductions. In between are installations by Cornelius Kolig: Der Flieger ("The Aviator"), a black male torso that merges into a beam above the navel; a wall of red roses. The two doors on the west and east sides are sliding doors made of stainless steel. On the window side, the lettering "TAT" runs across the entire front; opposite, on the bronze-colored sliding door in front of the toilet, the small lettering "ORT".

== Current usage ==
The Landhaus hosts the Carinthian Parliament, which convenes regularly, usually on Thursdays, in the session hall. The historic rooms on the first and second floors are occupied by the offices of the Landtag parties.

The Large and Small Heraldic Halls, the Sitting Hall, and the Colony Hall can be visited through guided tours, particularly during the summer months. Since 2003, the Landhaus Gallery has been situated on the first floor, showcasing art and exhibitions.

The ground floor and parts of the cellar are home to the restaurant Gasthaus im Landhaushof. In the 1990s, the cellar rooms hosted the cultural initiative Theater im Landhauskeller, providing a venue for theatrical performances.

== Literature ==
- Wilhelm Deuer, Das Landhaus zu Klagenfurt, Verlag des Kärntner Landesarchivs, Klagenfurt 1994, ISBN 3-900531-29-3
- Siegfried Hartwagner: Neuer Kaiser Verlag, Klagenfurt 1994.
- Erwin Hirtenfelder; Bertram Karl Steiner (1999), Tatort Kolig-Saal. 1929–1999, Universitätsverlag Carinthia, Klagenfurt 1999, ISBN 3-85378-498-4
- Urban Paumgartner (2002), Aristeion Carinthiae Claudiforum, lagenfurt, der Ehrenpreis Kärntens. Hrsg.: Thomas Lederer. Kärntner Landesarchiv, Klagenfurt 2002, ISBN 3-900531-51-X
