= Erwin Angerer =

Austrian politician (born 1964)

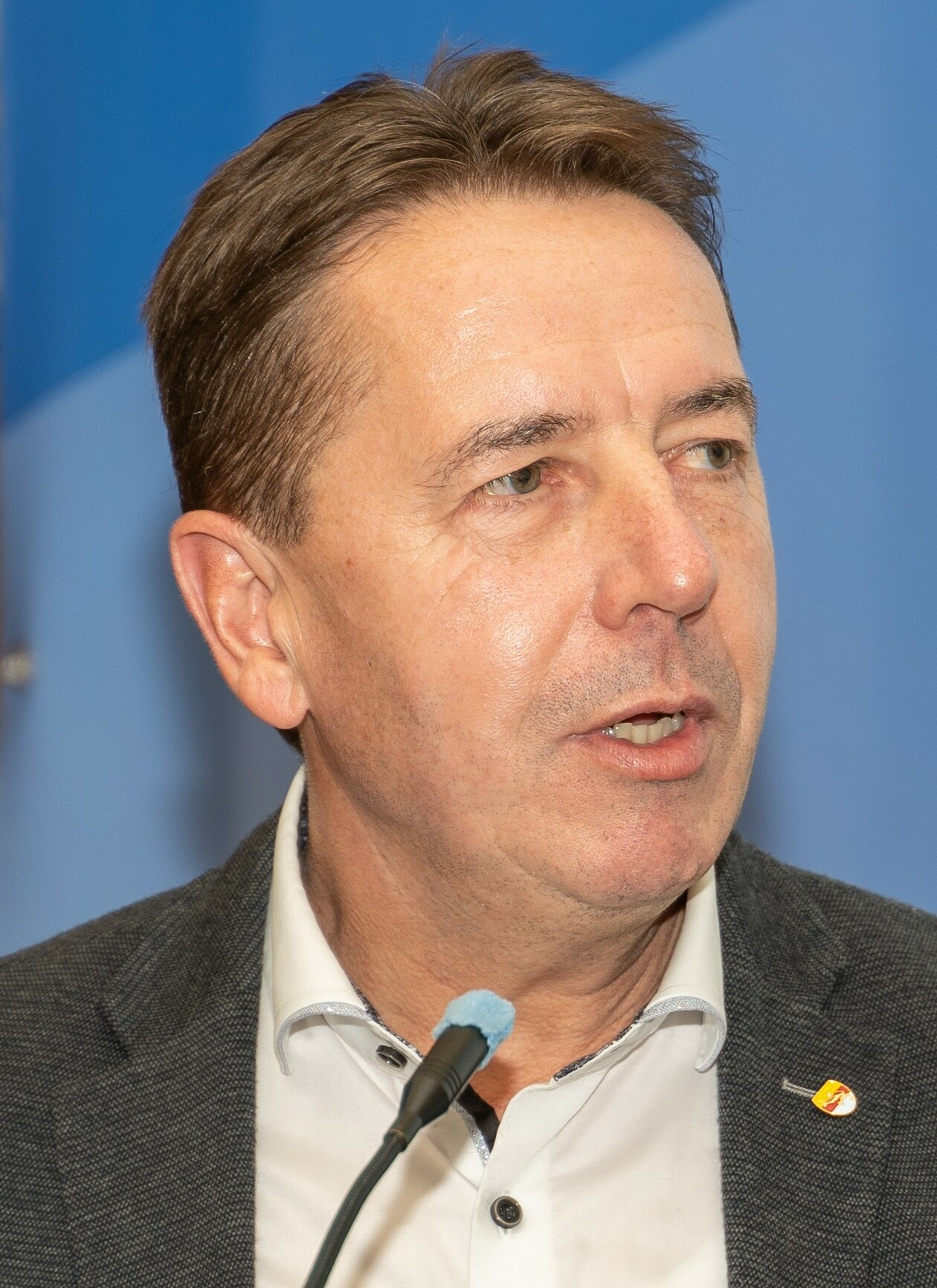

Member of the National Council
- In office 2 July 2014 – 12 April 2023
- Succeeded by: Maximilian Linder
- Constituency: 2 Kärnten

Personal details
- Born: 30 December 1964 (age 61)
- Party: Freedom Party of Austria

Erwin Angerer (born 30 December 1964, in Mühldorf) is an Austrian politician who has been a Member of the National Council for the Freedom Party of Austria (FPÖ) since 2014.
