= Janos Juvan =

Austrian politician (born 1985)

Member of the National Council
- Incumbent
- Assumed office 6 March 2025
- Preceded by: Beate Meinl-Reisinger
- Constituency: Federal list

Personal details
- Born: 4 January 1985 (age 41)
- Party: NEOS

Janos Juvan (born 4 January 1985) is an Austrian politician serving as a member of the National Council since 2025. He has served as spokesperson of NEOS in Carinthia since 2022.
