= Wilfried Martens Centre for European Studies =

Centre-right European political foundation

- Wilfried Martens Centre for European Studies
- Formation: 2007; 19 years ago
- Type: European political foundation
- Headquarters: Brussels, Belgium
- Location: European Union
- President: Mikuláš Dzurinda (SK)
- Executive Director: Tomi Huhtanen
- Policy Director: Peter Hefele
- Website: www.martenscentre.eu

The Wilfried Martens Centre for European Studies, also known as the Martens Centre and previously as the Centre for European Studies, is a think tank and European political foundation affiliated to the European People's Party (EPP). The Martens Centre links together a large network of political foundations across the European Union, which all hold centre-right political positions. The president of the Martens Centre is former prime minister of Slovakia Mikuláš Dzurinda. As a European political foundation, the Martens Centre is financed by the European Parliament and sponsors representing industry lobbying.

== Background ==
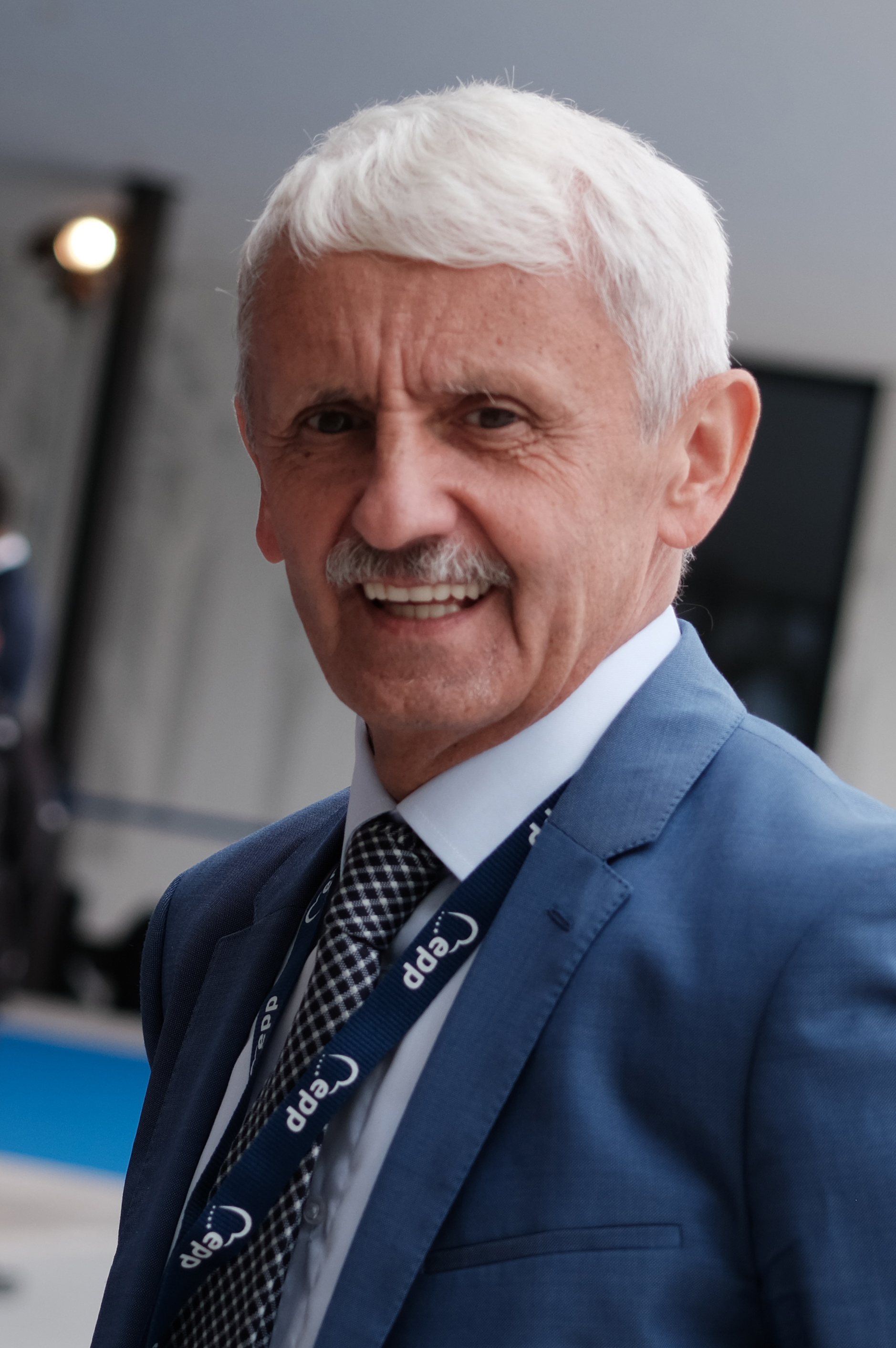
Mikuláš Dzurinda, current president of the Wilfried Martens Centre

The Martens Centre was founded by the EPP in 2007 as a result of the revision of the EU Regulation on European political parties, which allowed the creation of European political foundations and think tanks affiliated to European parties. Originally, the EPP established its foundation as the Centre for European Studies (CES). During the EPP Congress in Dublin in March 2014, the think tank was renamed as the "Wilfried Martens Centre for European Studies" or "Martens Centre" for short, to honour its founder, long-standing EPP president and former prime minister of Belgium, Wilfried Martens.

The Martens Centre has over 50 partners across Europe and other parts of the world. It seeks to advance a pan-European mindset, promoting Christian-democratic and liberal-conservative political values. It acts as a platform of cooperation for centre-right partners and experts, offering decision-makers and opinion leaders assistance in formulating new and effective policy options to assist the European Union in a variety of areas: global geopolitics, transatlantic relations, and democracy promotion. The Martens Centre produces publications in various formats. Besides the publications, the centre organises various projects with its partners along with in-house events throughout the year, along with other major events such as the European Ideas Forum, Net@Work, and the Transatlantic Think Tank Conference.

In 2023, the Russian authorities designated the Martens Centre as "undesirable".

== Publications ==
The Martens Centre monitors, analyses, and contributes to the debate relating to the policies of the EU, both on the expert and more general public level. The Centre produces research papers, books, policy briefs, collaborative publications, along with several other formats. A major publication of the centre is the European View policy journal, which covers contemporary themes of European politics, focusing on one specific issue in each edition. It typically involves a blend of academics, experts, politicians, and decision-makers.

Additional content from the Centre includes:

- Bridge the Channel: A monthly vlog providing updates about political developments in the UK and discussing the future of the Euro-British relationship in the aftermath of Brexit. The series is a successor to the Brexitometer, which provided monthly updates of the Brexit negotiations process.
- Podcast series: Brussels Bytes, Defence Dialogue, Europe Out Loud, and Her and EU.
- Thinking Talks: Long-form video interviews with centre-right political leaders.

== Events ==
The Martens Centre organises the European Ideas Forum (EIF), an annual conference bringing together EU leaders, European Commissioners, MEPs, economic experts, business leaders, and others to discuss various issues of European relevance. During the COVID-19 pandemic, EIF 2020 (October 2020) and EIF 2021 (June 2021) took place virtually, due to sanitary restrictions. EIF 2019 was held in Cyprus in March 2019 and EIF 2018 took place in Paris in June 2018. In addition, the Martens Centre holds the Annual Transatlantic Think Tank Conference, which organises discussions with policymakers from both sides of the Atlantic to discuss themes relating to transatlantic relations.

Other events include:

- Bled Strategic Forum - A leading international conference which offers a platform to express and contrast opinions on modern society and its future. The Forum brings together leaders from government, the private sector, and civil society to discuss and resolve present and future challenges.
- Ideas Network 2030: Summer University - A conference to engage EU and British participants in a debate about the future of Europe in various dimensions. Speakers with political backgrounds from the EU and its member states, and the United Kingdom discuss a range of topics.

== Corporate donors ==
The biggest known corporate sponsors of the Wilfried Martens Centre for European Studies include AT&T Global Network Services, Microsoft, and Apple.

== Awards and recognition ==
The Martens Centre was awarded the 'Best Digital Channel' trophy at the Digital Communication Awards in 2018, in recognition for the centre's 'Europe Out Loud' podcast series. In addition, the centre was ranked 11th political think tank worldwide in the 2020 Global Go To Think Tank Index Report, compiled by the University of Pennsylvania's Think Tanks and Civil Societies Program (TTCSP).

== Network of Member Foundations and Partners of the Martens Centre ==
The Martens Centre functions as a pan-European platform for member foundations, think tanks and experts from across Europe that share the centre's values and those of the centre-right EPP political family.

=== Member Foundations ===
- Academy for the Development of a Democratic Environment (Akkademja ghall-Izvilupp ta' Ambjent Demokratiku), Malta
- Amaro da Costa Institute (Instituto Amaro da Costa), Portugal
- Anton Korošec Institute (Inštitut dr. Antona Korošca), Slovenia
- Anton Tunega Foundation (Nadácia Anton Tunega), Slovakia
- Association of Citizens for European Development of Bulgaria (Сдружение Граждани за Европейско Развитие на България), Bulgaria
- Barankovics lstvan Foundation (Barankovics István Alapítvány), Hungary
- CDA Research Institute (Wetenschappelijk Instituut voor het CDA), the Netherlands
- CEDER Study Centre of CD&V (CEDER Studiedienst CD&V), Belgium
- Centre for Economic and Social Policy Studies (Centre d’Etudes Politiques Economiques et Sociales), Belgium
- Civic Institute (Instytut Obywatelski), Poland
- Collins Institute, Ireland
- Concord and Freedom Foundation (Fundación Concordia y Libertad), Spain
- Croatian Statehood Foundation (Zaklada Hrvatskog Državnog Zavjeta), Croatia
- De Gasperi Foundation (Fondazione De Gasperi), Italy
- Francisco Sá Carneiro Institute (Instituto Francisco Sá Carneiro), Portugal
- Freedom and Democracy Foundation (Fondacioni për Liri dhe Demokraci), Albania
- Glafkos Clerides Institute (Ινστιτούτο Γλαύκος Κληρίδης), Cyprus
- Hanns Seidel Foundation (Hanns Seidel Stiftung), Germany
- Institute dr. Janez Evangelist Krek (Inštitut dr. Janeza Evangelista Kreka), Slovenia
- Institute for Christian Democratic Politics (Institut pro křesťansko-demokratickou politiku), Czech Republic
- Institute for Popular Studies (Institutul de Studii Populare), Romania
- Jarl Hjalmarson Foundation (Jarl Hjalmarson Stiftelsen), Sweden
- Jože Pucnik Institute (Inštitut dr. Jože Pucnika), Slovenia
- Konrad Adenauer Foundation (Konrad-Adenauer-Stiftung), Germany
- Konstantinos Karamanlis Institute for Democracy (ΙΝΣΤΙΤΟYΤΟ ΔΗΜΟΚΡΑΤIΑΣ ΚΩΝΣΤΑΝΤIΝΟΣ ΚΑΡΑΜΑΝΛHΣ), Greece
- Kós Károly Academy Foundation (Kós Károly Akademia), Romania
- Luigi Sturzo Institute (Istituto Luigi Sturzo), Italy
- Matthias Bel Institute (Inštitút Mateja Bela – Bél Mátyás Intézet), Slovakia
- New Initiatives Centre (Fondacija Centar za nove inicijative), Bosnia and Herzegovina
- Political Academy of the Austrian People's Party (Politische Akademie der ÖVP), Austria
- Pro Patria Institute (Koolituskeskus Pro Patria), Estonia
- Toivo Think Tank (Ajatuspaja Toivo), Finland
- TOPAZ, Czech Republic

=== Partners ===
- Antall József Knowledge Centre of Political and Social Sciences Foundation (Antall József Politika- és Társadalomtudományi Tudásközpont Alapítvány), Hungary
- Belgrade Fund for Political Excellence (Beogradski fond za političku izuzetnost), Serbia
- European Academy for Democracy (Evropská akademie pro demokracii), Czech Republic
- European Values (Evropské hodnoty), Czech Republic
- Foundation for Social Research and Analysis (Fundacion para el Análisis y los Estudios Sociales), Spain
- GLOBSEC, Slovakia
- Ideas Network 2030, United Kingdom
- International Republican Institute, United States of America
- Jean Monnet European Center of Excellence, University of Athens, Greece
- Liberal Society (Societatea Liberala), Romania
- Maison du Futur (معهد الشرق الأوسط للأبحاث والدراسات الاستراتجية), Lebanon
- Middle East Institute for Research and Strategic Studies (معهد الشرق الأوسط للأبحاث والدراسات الاستراتجية), Lebanon
- Platform for Sustainable Growth (Plataforma para o Crescimento Sustentável), Portugal
- Robert Schuman Foundation (Fondation Robert Schuman), France
- Robert Schuman Institute, Hungary
- Sofia Security Forum (Софийски форум за сигурност), Bulgaria
- Kompassi (Ajatushautomo Kompassi ry), Finland
- ThinkYoung, Belgium
