= Robert Schuman Foundation (European People's Party) =

The Robert Schuman Foundation is a Christian Democratic think tank affiliated with the European People's Party group in the European Parliament, and named in honour of statesman Robert Schuman. Its president is Jacques Santer. It is affiliated to the Centre for European Studies, the official foundation/think tank of the European People's Party.

The foundation was established in 1989 in Luxembourg by Christian Democratic MEPs Egon Klepsch, Horst Langes, Andrea Bonetti, Conçeptio Ferrer, Johanna Maij-Weggen, Nicolas Estgen, and Françisco Lucas Pires. Its purpose was to support democracy in Central and Eastern Europe, Latin America, and Africa.
