= 2008 Lower Austrian state election =

← 2003	9 March 2008	2013 →

All 56 seats in the Landtag of Lower Austria 29 seats needed for a majority All 9 seats in the state government
- Turnout: 1,033,695 (74.5%) ▲2.7%
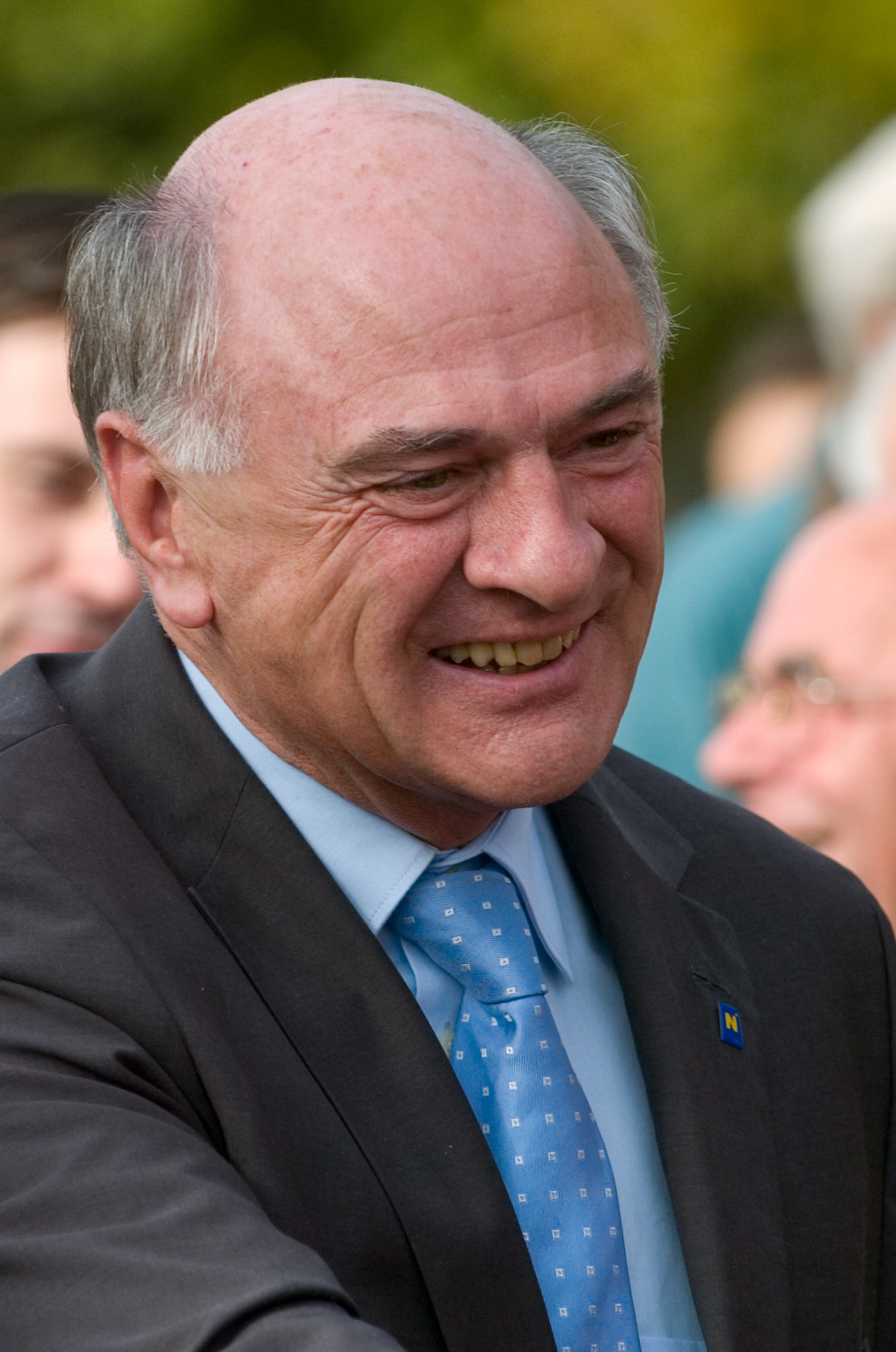

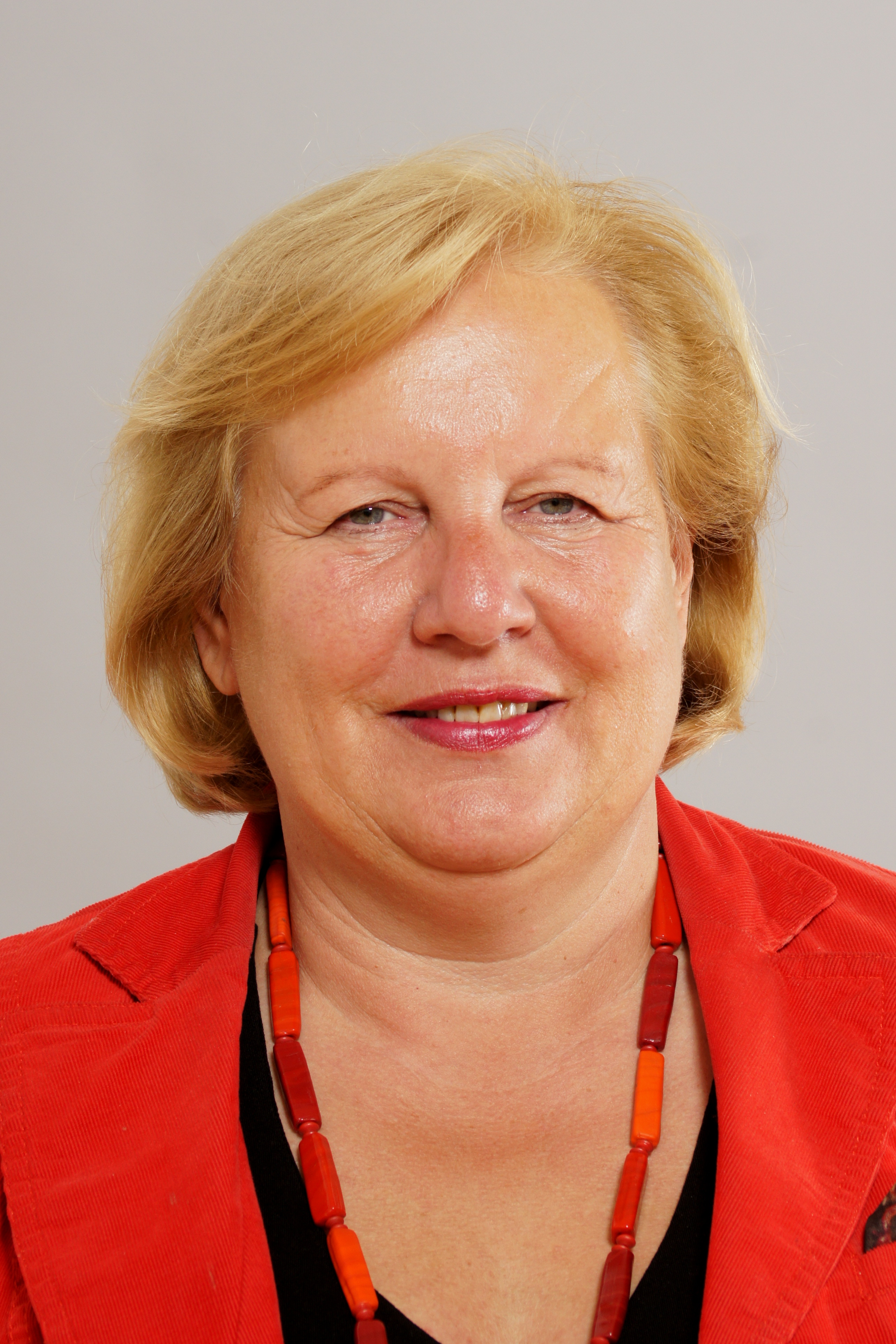

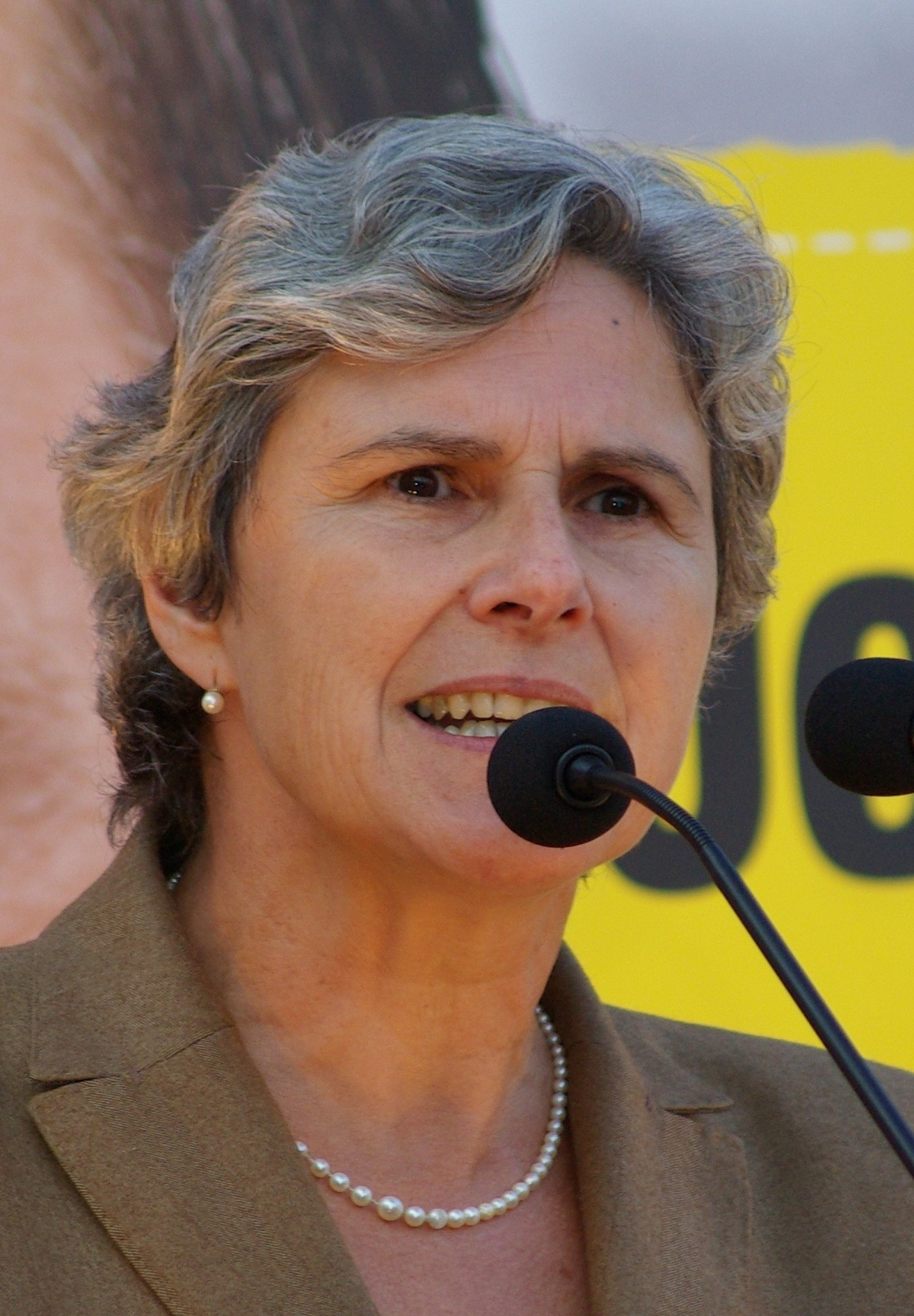

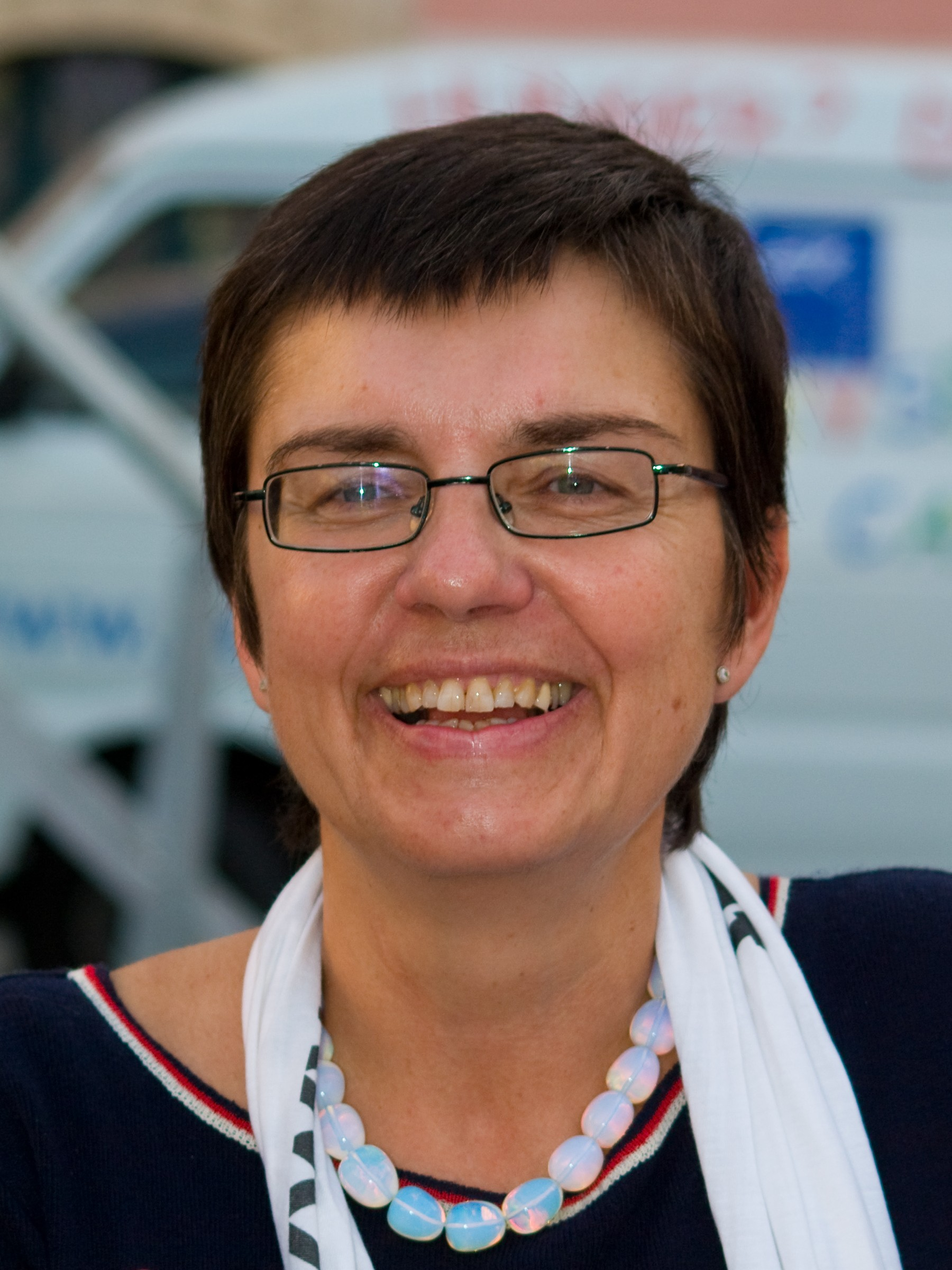
	First party	Second party
Leader	Erwin Pröll	Heidemaria Onodi
Party	ÖVP	SPÖ
Last election	31 seats, 53.3%	19 seats, 33.6%
Seats won	31	15
Seat change	0	▼4
Popular vote	549,510	257,770
Percentage	54.4%	25.5%
Swing	▲1.1%	▼8.0%
	Third party	Fourth party
Leader	Barbara Rosenkranz	Madeleine Petrovic
Party	FPÖ	Greens
Last election	2 seats, 4.5%	4 seats, 7.2%
Seats won	6	4
Seat change	▲4	0
Popular vote	105,748	69,852
Percentage	10.5%	6.9%
Swing	▲6.0%	▼0.3%
Governor before election
Erwin Pröll
ÖVP
Elected Governor
Erwin Pröll
ÖVP

The 2008 Lower Austrian state election was held on 9 March 2008 to elect the members of the Landtag of Lower Austria.

The Austrian People's Party (ÖVP) retained its majority. The major opposition party, the Social Democratic Party of Austria (SPÖ), suffered substantial losses. The Freedom Party of Austria (FPÖ) partially recovered from its 2003 losses, more than doubling its voteshare and tripling its number of seats.

== Background ==
The Lower Austrian constitution mandates that cabinet positions in the state government (state councillors, German: Landesräten) be allocated between parties proportionally in accordance with the share of votes won by each; this is known as Proporz. As such, the government is a perpetual coalition of all parties that qualify for at least one state councillor. After the 2003 election, the ÖVP had six councillors and the SPÖ three.

== Electoral system ==
The 56 seats of the Landtag of Lower Austria are elected via open list proportional representation in a two-step process. The seats are distributed between twenty-one multi-member constituencies. For parties to receive any representation in the Landtag, they must either win at least one seat in a constituency directly, or clear a 4 percent state-wide electoral threshold. Seats are distributed in constituencies according to the Hare quota, with any remaining seats allocated using the D'Hondt method at the state level, to ensure overall proportionality between a party's vote share and its share of seats.

== Contesting parties ==
The table below lists parties represented in the previous Landtag.

Name		Ideology	Leader	2003 result		
Name		Ideology	Leader	Votes (%)	Seats	Councillors
ÖVP	Austrian People's Party; Österreichische Volkspartei	Christian democracy	Erwin Pröll	53.3%	31 / 56	6 / 9
SPÖ	Social Democratic Party of Austria; Sozialdemokratische Partei Österreichs	Social democracy	Heidemaria Onodi	33.6%	19 / 56	3 / 9
GRÜNE	The Greens – The Green Alternative; Die Grünen – Die Grüne Alternative	Green politics	Madeleine Petrovic	7.2%	4 / 56	
FPÖ	Freedom Party of Austria; Freiheitliche Partei Österreichs	Right-wing populism Euroscepticism	Barbara Rosenkranz	4.5%	2 / 56	

In addition to the parties already represented in the Landtag, five parties collected enough signatures to be placed on the ballot.

- Communist Party of Austria (KPÖ)
- The Christians (DCP) – on the ballot only in 20 constituencies
- Alliance for the Future of Austria (BZÖ) – on the ballot only in 17 constituencies
- List for our Lower Austria (LNÖ) – on the ballot only in 6 constituencies
- Animal Rights Party (TRP) – on the ballot only in Mödling

== Results ==
Party	Votes	%	+/−	Seats	+/−	Coun.	+/−
Austrian People's Party (ÖVP)	549,510	54.39	+1.10	31	±0	6	±0
Social Democratic Party of Austria (SPÖ)	257,770	25.51	–8.04	15	–4	2	–1
Freedom Party of Austria (FPÖ)	105,748	10.47	+5.98	6	+4	1	+1
The Greens – The Green Alternative (GRÜNE)	69,852	6.91	–0.31	4	±0	0	±0
Communist Party of Austria (KPÖ)	8,661	0.86	+0.09	0	±0	0	±0
The Christians (DCP)	8,537	0.84	New	0	New	0	New
Alliance for the Future of Austria (BZÖ)	7,250	0.72	New	0	New	0	New
List for our Lower Austria (LNÖ)	2,174	0.22	New	0	New	0	New
Animal Rights Party (TRP)	854	0.08	New	0	New	0	New
Invalid/blank votes	23,339	–	–	–	–	–	–
Total	1,033,695	100	–	56	0	9	0
Registered voters/turnout	1,387,368	74.51	+2.72	–	–	–	–
Source: Lower Austrian Government

Popular vote
ÖVP	54.39%
SPÖ	25.51%
FPÖ	10.47%
GRÜNE	6.91%
Other	2.72%

Landtag seats
ÖVP	55.36%
SPÖ	25.00%
FPÖ	10.71%
GRÜNE	7.14%

=== Results by constituency ===
Constituency	ÖVP		SPÖ		FPÖ		Grüne		Others	Total seats	Turnout
Constituency	%	S	%	S	%	S	%	S	%	Total seats	Turnout
Amstetten	58.6	3	22.7	1	10.1		6.0		2.6	4	79.1
Baden	47.2	2	29.1	1	12.8		7.9		3.0	3	70.2
Bruck an der Leitha	51.2		30.7		10.7		5.7		1.7	0	72.6
Gänserndorf	47.9	1	30.9	1	12.1		5.9		3.2	2	71.3
Gmünd	54.1		31.1		8.1		4.3		2.4	0	77.9
Hollabrunn	60.7	1	23.5		8.5		5.3		2.1	1	77.8
Horn	68.6	1	18.1		6.4		4.8		2.0	1	79.2
Korneuburg	56.0	1	22.0		10.8		8.7		2.5	1	73.0
Krems an der Donau	60.5	2	21.2		8.9		6.2		3.2	2	76.9
Lilienfeld	51.2		32.2		9.6		4.7		2.3	0	79.5
Melk	55.1	1	26.0		11.0		5.3		2.7	1	80.2
Mistelbach	60.5	2	22.4		9.5		5.5		2.2	2	78.0
Mödling	52.0	2	21.5		9.4		12.9		4.3	2	68.3
Neunkirchen	49.4	1	30.8	1	11.7		5.7		2.4	2	75.2
Sankt Pölten	49.4	2	28.4	1	11.6		7.4		3.2	3	75.6
Scheibbs	60.9	1	21.9		8.9		5.9		2.4	1	80.5
Tulln	58.4	1	22.4		9.7		7.1		2.3	1	75.7
Waidhofen an der Thaya	63.1		20.7		10.2		4.6		1.4	0	78.0
Wiener Neustadt	50.5	2	29.0	1	12.0		5.7		2.7	3	71.9
Vienna Surrounds	46.9	2	27.5	1	11.4		11.6		2.7	3	65.3
Zwettl	70.0	1	15.6		7.8		4.5		2.2	1	81.9
Remaining seats		5		8		6		4		23	
Total	54.4	31	25.5	15	10.5	6	6.9	4	2.7	56	74.5
Source: Lower Austrian Government

=== Preference votes ===
Alongside votes for a party, voters were able to cast a preferential votes for a candidate on the party list. The ten candidates with the most preferential votes were as follows:

Party	Pos.	Candidate	Votes	%
ÖVP	1	Erwin Pröll	303,022	91.2
SPÖ	1	Heidemaria Onodi	45,445	58.5
FPÖ	1	Barbara Rosenkranz	45,371	86.8
GRÜNE	1	Madeleine Petrovic	18,973	66.5
SPÖ	2	Emil Schabl	4,131	5.3
ÖVP	3	Wolfgang Sobotka	3,961	1.2
ÖVP	4	Josef Plank	3,748	1.1
ÖVP	2	Ernest Gabmann	2,695	0.8
ÖVP	30	Bettina Rausch	2,441	0.7
SPÖ	13	Josef Jahrmann	2,211	2.8
