= Doris Pack =

German politician, president of EPP Women (born 1942)

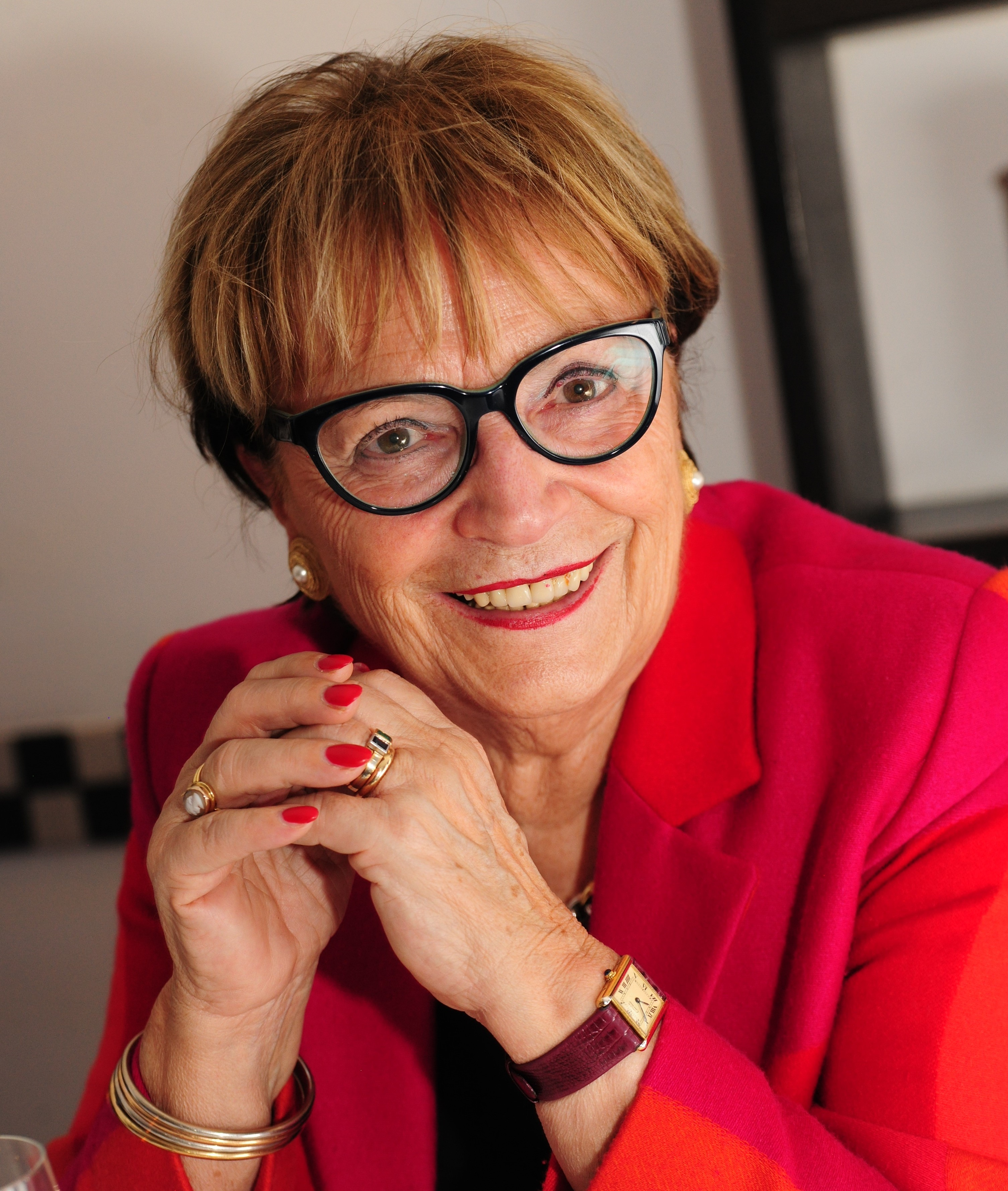
- Doris Pack EPP Women President

Member of the European Parliament for Germany
- In office 1989–2014

Member of the Bundestag
- In office 1974–1983
- In office 1985–1989

Personal details
- Born: 18 March 1942 (age 84) Schiffweiler
- Party: Christian Democratic Union, European People's Party
- Profession: Teacher

Doris Pack (born 18 March 1942, Schiffweiler) is a German politician, president of EPP Women, president of the Robert Schuman Institute and former Member of the European Parliament 1989–2014. She served as a member of the Bundestag 1974–1983 and 1985–1989. She is a member of the conservative Christian Democratic Union, part of the European People's Party. Pack is the chair of the EU Committee on Culture and Education (since 2009).

She is chair of the Franco-German Foundation for Cultural Cooperation, president of the European Children's Book Fair Association, member of the ZDF Television Council, president of the Saar Adult Education Association, and, vice-president of the European Movement on the Saar. She also is president of Women in the EPP and executive member of the European People's Party. She was a member of the Parliamentary Assembly of the Council of Europe and of the Assembly of the Western European Union (1981–1983 and 1985–1989). She is chairwoman of the advisory board of A Soul for Europe.

She graduated from teaching college in 1965 and worked as a teacher in primary schools until 1974. From 1983 to 1985, she was employed by the Saarland Ministry of Education.

== Award ==
She was decorated with Order of Duke Trpimir in 1995 by the president of Croatia Franjo Tuđman.

In 2007 she got honoris causa doctorate at the University of Zadar (Croatia).
