= 2003 Lower Austrian state election =

Election of Lower Austria's state legislature

← 1998	30 March 2003	2008 →

All 56 seats in the Landtag of Lower Austria 29 seats needed for a majority All 9 seats in the state government
- Turnout: 937,487 (71.8%) ▼0.2%
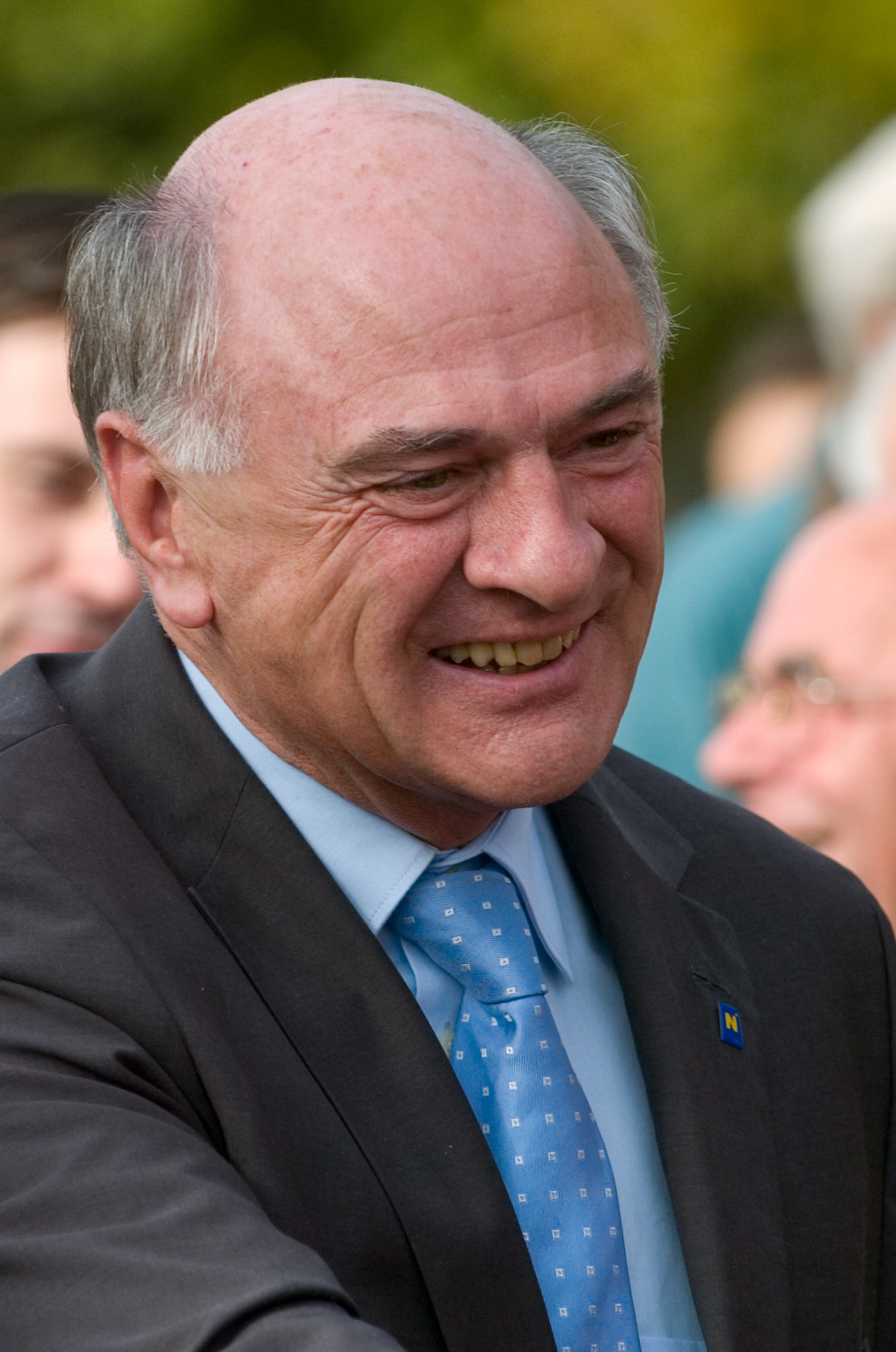

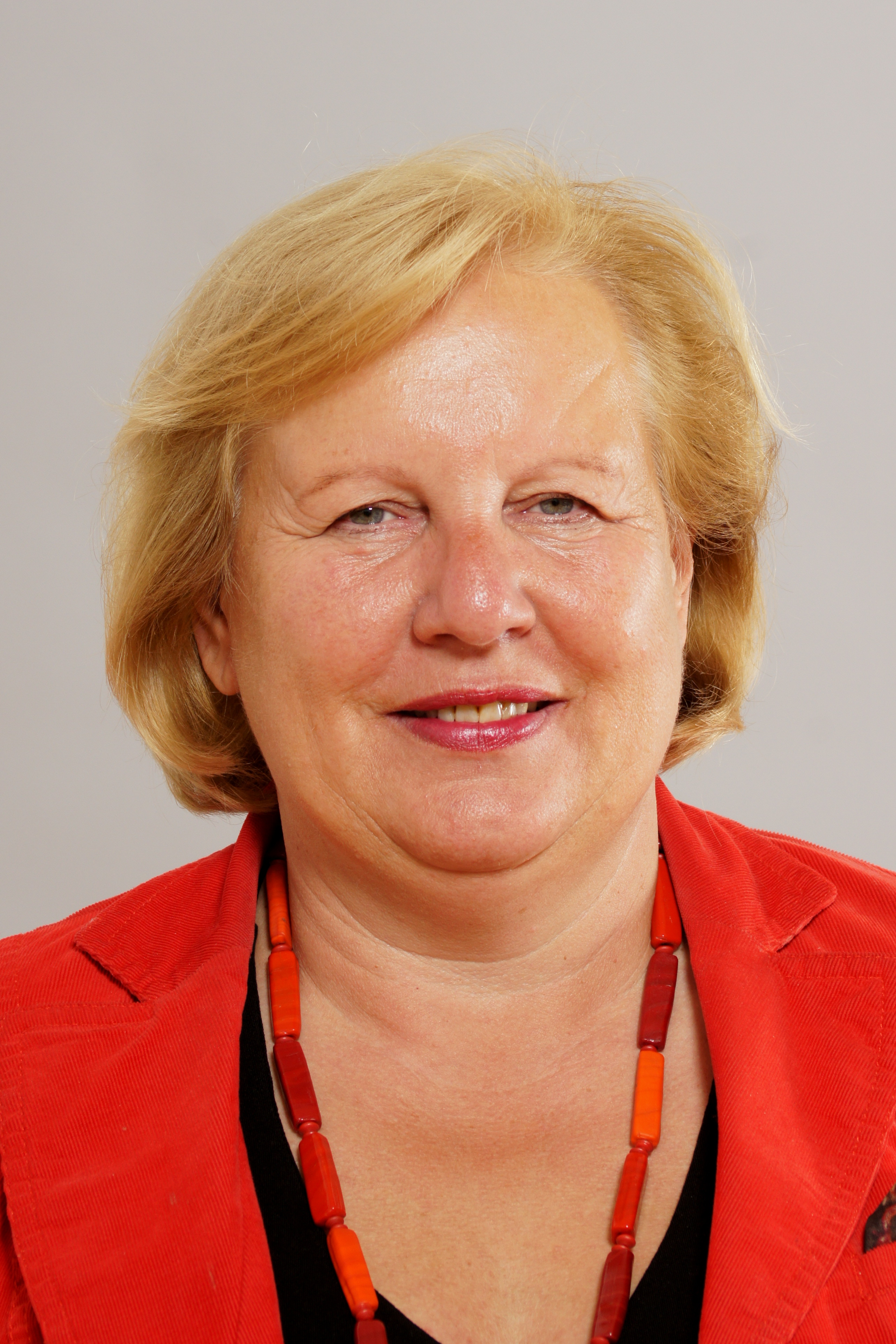
	First party	Second party
Leader	Erwin Pröll	Heidemaria Onodi
Party	ÖVP	SPÖ
Last election	27 seats, 44.9%	18 seats, 30.4%
Seats won	31	19
Seat change	▲4	▲1
Popular vote	491,065	309,199
Percentage	53.3%	33.6%
Swing	▲8.4%	▲3.2%
	Third party	Fourth party
Party	Greens	FPÖ
Last election	2 seats, 4.5%	9 seats, 16.1%
Seats won	4	2
Seat change	▲2	▼7
Popular vote	66,543	41,391
Percentage	7.2%	4.5%
Swing	▲2.7%	▼11.6%
Governor before election
Erwin Pröll
ÖVP
Elected Governor
Erwin Pröll
ÖVP

The 2003 Lower Austrian state election was held on 30 March 2003 to elect the members of the Landtag of Lower Austria.

The election was won by the Austrian People's Party (ÖVP), who won an absolute majority in the Landtag for the first time since 1988. They achieved a strong swing of 8.4 percentage points. The Social Democratic Party of Austria (SPÖ) and The Greens also made gains; this was enabled by the collapse of the Freedom Party of Austria (FPÖ). The FPÖ lost almost three-quarters of its vote share and only narrowly passed the 4% electoral threshold, falling from nine seats to just two.

== Background ==
The Lower Austrian constitution mandates that cabinet positions in the state government (state councillors, German: Landesräten) be allocated between parties proportionally in accordance with the share of votes won by each; this is known as Proporz. As such, the government is a perpetual coalition of all parties that qualify for at least one state councillor. After the 1998 election, the ÖVP had five councillors, the SPÖ three, and the FPÖ one.

== Electoral system ==
The 56 seats of the Landtag of Lower Austria are elected via open list proportional representation in a two-step process. The seats are distributed between twenty-one multi-member constituencies. For parties to receive any representation in the Landtag, they must either win at least one seat in a constituency directly, or clear a 4 percent state-wide electoral threshold. Seats are distributed in constituencies according to the Hare quota, with any remaining seats allocated using the D'Hondt method at the state level, to ensure overall proportionality between a party's vote share and its share of seats.

== Contesting parties ==
The table below lists parties represented in the previous Landtag.

Name		Ideology	Leader	1998 result		
Name		Ideology	Leader	Votes (%)	Seats	Councillors
ÖVP	Austrian People's Party; Österreichische Volkspartei	Christian democracy	Erwin Pröll	44.9%	27 / 56	5 / 9
SPÖ	Social Democratic Party of Austria; Sozialdemokratische Partei Österreichs	Social democracy	Heidemaria Onodi	30.4%	18 / 56	3 / 9
FPÖ	Freedom Party of Austria; Freiheitliche Partei Österreichs	Right-wing populism Euroscepticism	?	16.1%	9 / 56	1 / 9
GRÜNE	The Greens – The Green Alternative; Die Grünen – Die Grüne Alternative	Green politics	?	4.5%	2 / 56	

In addition to the parties already represented in the Landtag, three parties collected enough signatures to be placed on the ballot.

- Green independent Austria – List of EU Opposition Gabriela Wladyka (GRÜNÖ)
- Communist Party of Austria (KPÖ)
- Christian Voter Community (CWG)

== Results ==
Party	Votes	%	+/−	Seats	+/−	Coun.	+/−
Austrian People's Party (ÖVP)	491,065	53.29	+8.42	31	+4	6	+1
Social Democratic Party of Austria (SPÖ)	309,199	33.55	+3.16	19	+1	3	±0
The Greens – The Green Alternative (GRÜNE)	66,543	7.22	+2.73	4	+2	0	±0
Freedom Party of Austria (FPÖ)	41,391	4.49	–11.59	2	–7	0	–1
Communist Party of Austria (KPÖ)	7,074	0.77	+0.13	0	±0	0	±0
Green independent Austria (GRÜNÖ)	6,013	0.65	New	0	New	0	New
Christian Voter Community (CWG)	187	0.02	New	0	New	0	New
Invalid/blank votes	16,015	–	–	–	–	–	–
Total	937,487	100	–	56	0	9	0
Registered voters/turnout	1,305,950	71.79	–0.16	–	–	–	–
Source: Lower Austrian Government

Popular vote
ÖVP	53.29%
SPÖ	33.55%
GRÜNE	7.22%
FPÖ	4.49%
Other	1.44%

Landtag seats
ÖVP	55.36%
SPÖ	33.93%
GRÜNE	7.14%
FPÖ	3.57%

=== Results by constituency ===
Constituency	ÖVP		SPÖ		Grüne		FPÖ		Others	Total seats	Turnout
Constituency	%	S	%	S	%	S	%	S	%	Total seats	Turnout
Amstetten	58.4	3	30.3	1	6.5		3.6		1.2	4	76.7
Baden	45.7	2	39.5	1	8.1		5.0		1.6	3	66.4
Bruck an der Leitha	48.4		39.7		5.9		4.8		1.2	0	71.1
Gänserndorf	48.4	1	39.6	1	6.0		4.6		1.5	2	69.7
Gmünd	48.2		42.1		3.8		4.5		1.3	0	75.6
Hollabrunn	61.1	1	27.9		5.3		4.6		1.1	1	74.3
Horn	67.3	1	22.6		5.2		4.0		0.9	1	76.6
Korneuburg	54.7	1	30.1		9.0		4.8		1.4	1	68.8
Krems an der Donau	59.2	2	27.6		7.1		4.6		1.6	2	74.6
Lilienfeld	48.4		41.2		4.6		4.2		1.6	0	78.0
Melk	55.6	1	33.1	1	5.2		4.8		1.3	2	77.8
Mistelbach	60.3	2	27.8		6.3		4.3		1.3	2	74.8
Mödling	50.0	2	28.7	1	14.3		5.0		2.0	3	62.9
Neunkirchen	47.8	1	41.0	1	6.3		3.8		1.2	2	72.7
Sankt Pölten	48.4	2	37.9	2	7.6		4.3		1.7	4	74.2
Scheibbs	62.6	1	26.8		5.8		3.5		1.3	1	78.5
Tulln	57.8	1	28.9		7.3		4.5		1.5	1	74.4
Waidhofen an der Thaya	61.5		26.1		4.9		6.1		1.4	0	74.9
Wiener Neustadt	48.6	2	40.0	1	6.1		3.8		1.4	3	69.3
Vienna Surrounds	44.0	1	36.9	1	12.0		5.4		1.87	2	61.9
Zwettl	69.0	1	20.1		5.1		4.7		1.1	1	78.1
Remaining seats		6		9		4		2		21	
Total	53.3	31	33.6	19	7.2	4	4.5	2	1.4	56	71.8
Source: Lower Austrian Government
