= Animal Rights Party =

Animal Rights Party Tierrechtspartei
- Leader: Ralph Chaloupek
- Founded: 2008?
- Ideology: Animal rights Animal welfare

The Animal Rights Party (German: Tierrechtspartei, TRP) is an inactive animal welfare political party in Austria. It is led by Ralph Chaloupek. It contested the Lower Austrian state election 2008 (although only in Mödling, where it got 854 votes and became the strongest minor party with 1.34% locally). It also contested the 2008 national election, but only in Vienna.
