= Political Academy of the Austrian People's Party =

Educational and think-tank institution

Coordinates: 48.1789°N 16.3187°E

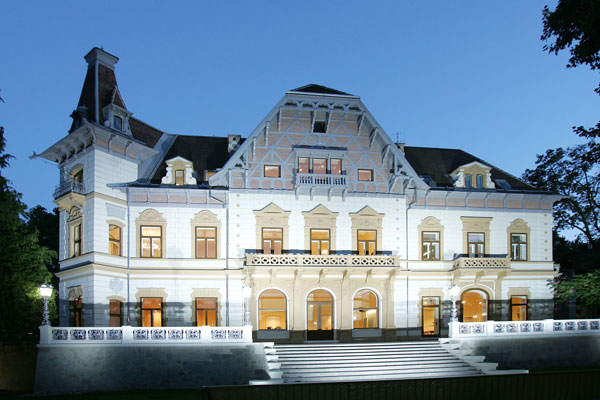
The Springer-Schlössl, seat of the Political Academy of the ÖVP

The Political Academy of the Austrian People's Party is the educational institution of the Austrian People's Party (Österreichische Volkspartei).

The Political Academy supports civic, political and cultural education by means of seminars, training courses, lectures, publications, applied research, etc. The Political Academy is located in the Springer Schlössl (Springer Castle) in Vienna.

It is a member of the Centre for European Studies, the official foundation/think tank of the European People's Party.

== Development ==
On 9 July 1972, the Austrian National Assembly passed the Federal Law on the Promotion of Civic Educational Activities in the Area of the Political Parties as well as Journalism. This federal law determined that the government would promote the "civic educational activities of the political parties through allocation of funds to foundations or associations". The Political Academy was founded in the same year. In 1975 the definitive training and administration centre was completed in the Springer Schlössl in the Viennese district of Meidling and handed over to the Political Academy. The Springer Schlössl had formerly been the site of the ÖVP's Vogelsangheim. The Political Academy's predecessor was named after Karl von Vogelsang, the Austrian social reformer and spiritual founder of the Christian Social Party.

At the same time, the other parties represented in the National Assembly founded their own political academies: The Social Democratic Party's Dr. Karl Renner Institute and the Freedom Party's Education Institute. The foundation of the Green's Educational Workshop followed in 1987.

== Political further education ==
The political further education activities of the Political Academy of the ÖVP are in keeping with the stipulations determined in the currently valid Law for the Support of Journalism from 1984. These include that the activities of the Political Academy not be aimed at profit-making and that the Political Academy support civic education in the sense of the principles in the federal constitution.

In numerous events and publications, the Austrian Think-tank deals with socio-political matters, the further development of Christian-Democratic programmes and the implementation of political concepts in practice. According to ENOP the academy also provides for the training and further education of political representatives, MPs, functionaries and party workers. The Political Academy is committed to fulfilling the role of a meeting place and discourse medium for both national and international experts and representatives from various fields of policy-making, politics, science and research and diplomacy. A dense programme of activities such as panel discussions, work shops, conferences and public lectures as well as regular publications is aimed at informing and involving the public.

== Recent publications ==
Jahrbuch für Politik (Political Yearbook)

The most important political, society, social, economic and cultural developments of the previous year are reviewed and analyzed in the Jahrbuch für Politik (ÖJP). The yearbook is the standard work of political literature in Austria.

Schlüsselbegriffe der Demokratie (Key Concepts of Democracy)

This volume analyzes central concepts of the contemporary political debate such as social justice, small and medium-sized businesses, property, education, the family, equality and many other matters of importance.

Christlich-soziale Signaturen

The book discusses the impact of Christian philosophy for Christian democracy.

== International cooperation ==
The Political Academy participates in international cooperation with other foundations close to the ÖVP as well as other European think tanks and foundations such as the Martens Centre, the European Ideas Network (EIN) and the European Network of Political Foundations (ENoP).

== Directors of the Political Academy ==
- 1972–1974: Prof. Karl Pisa (acting director)
- 1974–1992: Ao. Univ.-Prof Dr. Andreas Khol
- 1992–1996: Mag. Dr. Bernhard Markus Löhri
- 1996–2006: Univ.-Prof. Dr. Günther Burkert-Dottolo
- 2007–2008: Mag. Peter Danich (acting director)
- 2008-2020: Mag.Dr. Dietmar Halper
- 2020- : Mag. Elisabeth Mayerhofer

== Presidents of the Political Academy ==
- 1972–1990: Dr. Alfred Maleta
- 1990–1996: Ambassador (retd.) Dipl.-Vw. Dr. Ludwig Steiner
- 1996–2004: Member of the National Assembly (retd.) President Dr. Heinrich Neisser
- 2004- 2014: Member of the National assembly (retd.) President Dr. Werner Fasslabend
- 2015-2018 : Sebastian Kurz
- 2018- : Bettina Rausch
