= Robert Schuman Institute =

Primary data
- Founded: 1995
- Location: Budapest, Hungary
- President: Mariya Gabriel
- Honorary Presidents: Doris Pack & Wim van Velzen
- Area served: Europe, EU, Balkans, Eastern Europe
- Focus: politics, education, development
- Political position: Center-right, European People's Party
- Website: schuman-institute.eu
- Facebook: facebook.com/schuman.institute

The Union of the Robert Schuman Institute for Developing Democracy in Central and Eastern Europe (short: Robert Schuman Institute, RSI) is the European level training institution of the European People's Party political family, based in Budapest, Hungary. It was founded in 1995 as the successor of the Christian Democratic Academy for Central and Eastern Europe. The members of the union of RSI are political parties, organisations and foundations and its main activity comprises political and civic education.

The institute is named after Robert Schuman, a French Christian-Democratic politician, former French Prime Minister and Finance Minister, who is also considered one of the "founding fathers" today's European Union.

== The founding organisations of RSI ==
The RSI was founded by:

- European Union of Christian Democrats
- The Robert Schuman Foundation Luxembourg
- The Foundation for European Studies
- The European People's Party / Christian Democrats (EPP)
- Centre for Political, Economical and Social Studies (CEPESS), Belgium
- Christian Democratic People's Party (KDNP), Hungary
- Fondation d'Etudes Européens, international organisation
- Fondation Robert Schuman, Luxemburg
- Haza és Haladás Foundation, Hungary
- Hungarian Democratic Forum (MDF), Hungary
- István Barankovics Foundation, Hungary
- Lajos Batthyány Foundation, Hungary
- Lakitelek Foundation, Hungary
- Partido Popular, Spain
- Parti Populaire Européen, international organisation
- Unio Democratica de Catalunya, Spain

== Mission ==
The RSI's mission is:

- Promoting the idea of a united Europe, the basic values of the EPP and Christian Democracy
- Supporting the process of democratic transformation and the development of civil societies in Central, Eastern and South Eastern Europe
- Contributing to the development of the EPP sister and co-operating parties by education and training
- Facilitating the information flow between EU members, accession countries and neighbouring European states
- Building up a cross-border network based on shared values and political orientation

== Members of the Union of the Robert Schuman Institute ==
LIST OF REGULAR MEMBERS	Country
European People's Party (EPP)	EU
Robert Schuman Foundation (RSF)	Luxembourg
Politische Akademie der ÖVP (PolAk)	Austria
Foundation for a Civic Hungary (SZPMA)	Hungary
Christen Democratisch Appél, (CDA)	The Netherlands
Kristdemokraterna	Sweden
Fondation Robert Schuman, (FRS)	France
Youth of the European People's Party (YEPP)	EU
European Union of Christian Democratic Workers (EUCDW)	EU
European Democrat Students, (EDS)	EU
European Senior Citizens' Union (ESU)	EU
Europaisches Zentrum für Arbeitnehmerfragen (EZA)	Germany
Democratic Alliance of Hungarians in Romania, (RMDSZ)	Romania
Partido Popular (PP)	Spain

LIST OF HONORARY MEMBERS	Country
Christen-Democratisch en Vlaams (CD&V)	Belgium
Croatian Democratic Union of BiH (HDZ BiH)	Bosnia and Herzegovina
Union of Democratic Forces (UDF)	Bulgaria
Christian and Democratic Union - Czechoslovak People's Party (KDU-CSL)	Czech Republic
Isamaaliit, Pro Patria Union	Estonia
Nea Demokratia (ND)	Greece
MCL – Movimento Cristiano Lavoratori	Italy
Pavel Shatev Institute	Macedonia
Kristelig Volkeparti (KrF)	Norway
Party of the Hungarian Community (MKP)	Slovakia
Christian Democratic Movement, (KDH)	Slovakia
Nova Slovenija (NSi)	Slovenia
Slovenian Democratic Party (SDS)	Slovenia
Democratic Alliance	Ukraine
