= ThinkYoung =

- Founded: 2009
- Founders: Andrea Gerosa; Azzurra Giorgio; Stefano Benini
- Founded at: Brussels, Belgium
- Type: International nonprofit association (AISBL)
- Headquarters: Brussels, Belgium
- Region served: Europe, Asia and Africa
- Managing director: Andrea Gerosa
- Website: thinkyoung.eu

ThinkYoung is a non-profit and non-partisan think tank based in Brussels. Founded in 2009 by Andrea Gerosa, Azzurra Giorgio, and Stefano Benini, it conducts research, develops policy proposals, and runs documentaries and impact programmes on issues affecting young people with cultural, corporate and government partners. In addition to its Brussels headquarters, it has offices in Europe, Africa, Asia, and the United States.

== History ==
ThinkYoung was founded in Brussels in 2009 by Andrea Gerosa, Azzurra Giorgio, and Stefano Benini, three alumni of Bocconi University. According to Gerosa, the group was created in response to the underrepresentation of young people in European institutions. In its early years, ThinkYoung published articles and surveys on youth issues before expanding into commissioned research, conferences, and documentary production.

In January 2010, ThinkYoung was incorporated in Belgium as an AISBL (international nonprofit association). By 2011, it had opened an office in Geneva, and by 2014, an office in Hong Kong.

== Research and programmes ==
ThinkYoung conducts studies, surveys, focus groups, and data analysis on public policy issues affecting Millennials, Generation Z, and younger generations. It also produces policy proposals, documentaries, schools, and workshops based on its research.

Since 2011, ThinkYoung has run training initiatives for young people focused on entrepreneurship education, including programmes and events connecting participants with entrepreneurs and business leaders in cities such as Brussels and Hong Kong. In 2016, it launched a coding and STEM programme in partnership with Boeing aimed at equipping young people with digital skills and hands-on STEM experience, which was later implemented in several regions including Africa, Europe and West Asia. ThinkYoung also organizes the Western Balkans Youth Orchestra. In the past, ThinkYoung also organised Markerstown, an annual event held in Brussels celebrating young people applying technology and innovation to manufacturing traditions.

Through its ThinkYoung Audiovisual Laboratory, the organisation has trained young filmmakers and produced documentaries on youth issues in more than 30 countries.
