= European People's Party =

Centre-right European political party

- Abbreviation: EPP
- President: Manfred Weber (DE)
- Secretary-General: Dolors Montserrat (ES)
- Founded: 8 July 1976; 50 years ago
- Headquarters: Rue du Commerce—Handelsstraat (Q69872011) 10, 1000 Brussels, European Quarter, Belgium
- Think tank: Wilfried Martens Centre
- Student wing: European Democrat Students
- Youth wing: Youth of the European People's Party
- Women's wing: Women of the European People's Party
- Membership (22 December 2025): 23
- Ideology: Christian democracy; Liberal conservatism; Conservatism; Pro-Europeanism
- Political position: Centre-right
- European Parliament group: European People's Party Group; Renew Europe (PMP)
- International affiliation: Centrist Democrat International; International Democracy Union
- Colours: Dark blue; Selective yellow; Sky blue (customary)
- European Parliament: 182 / 720
- European Commission: 11 / 27
- European Council: 11 / 27
- EU lower/unicameral houses: 1,532 / 6,217
- EU upper houses: 461 / 1,459

Website
- epp.eu

The European People's Party (EPP) is a European political party with Christian democratic, liberal-conservative, and conservative member parties. Founded by primarily Christian-democratic parties in 1976, it has since broadened its membership to include liberal-conservative parties and parties with other centre-right political perspectives. On 31 May 2022, the party elected as its President Manfred Weber, who was also EPP's Spitzenkandidat in 2019.

The EPP has been the largest party in the European Parliament since 1999 and in the European Council since 2002. It is also the largest party in the current European Commission. The President of the European Commission, Ursula von der Leyen, and the President of the European Parliament, Roberta Metsola, are from the EPP. Many of the founding fathers of the European Union were also from parties that later formed the EPP.

The EPP includes major centre-right parties such as the CDU/CSU of Germany, the Nationalist Party of Malta, the People's Party (PP) of Spain, Forza Italia of Italy, ÖVP of Austria, HDZ of Croatia, PNL of Romania, Fine Gael of Ireland, National Coalition Party of Finland, New Democracy of Greece, the Moderates of Sweden, the Civic Coalition of Poland, the Social Democratic Party of Portugal, and the Citizens for European Development of Bulgaria.

== History ==
Logo of European People's Party from 2005 to 2015

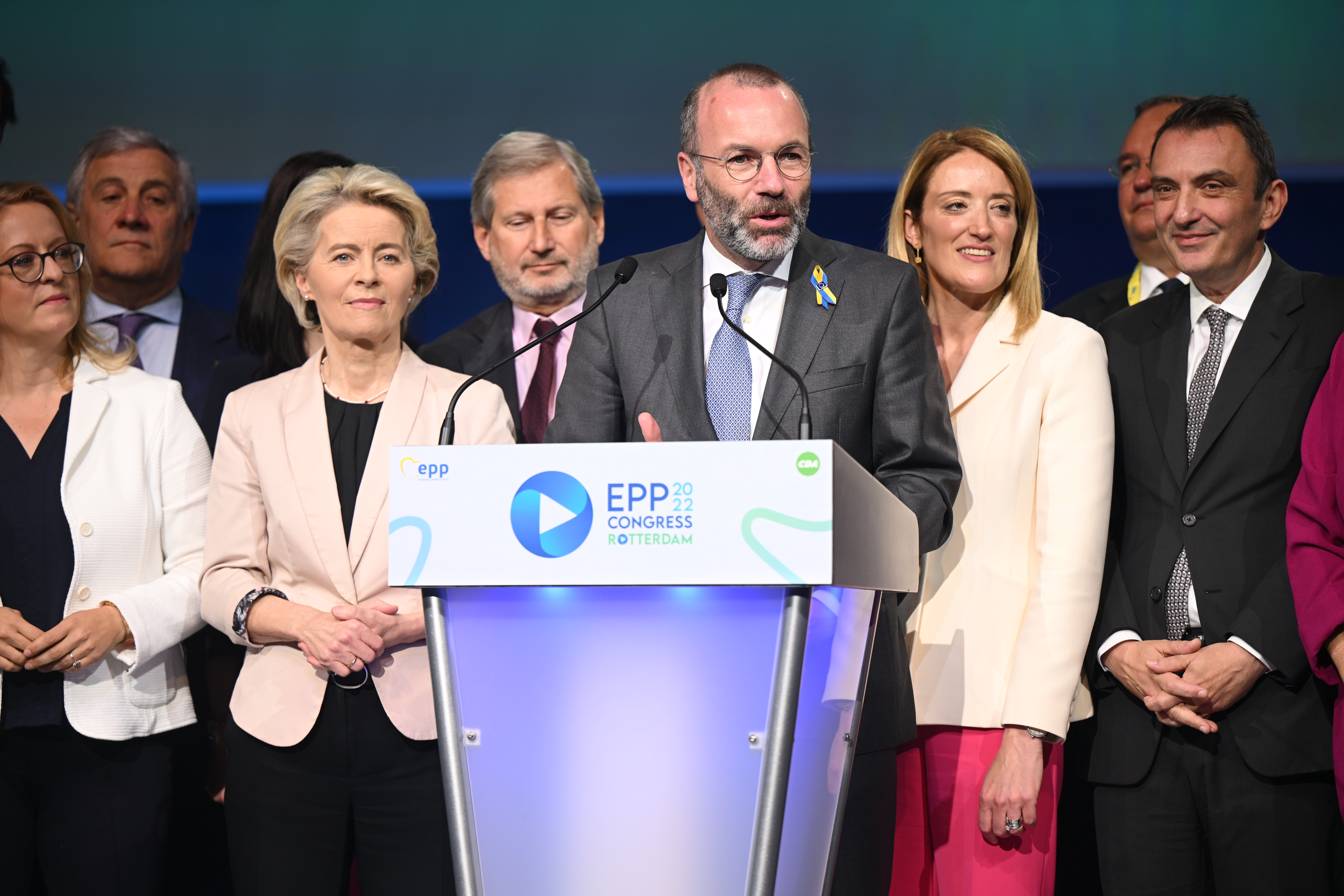
President Manfred Weber, 2022 Rotterdam EPP Congress

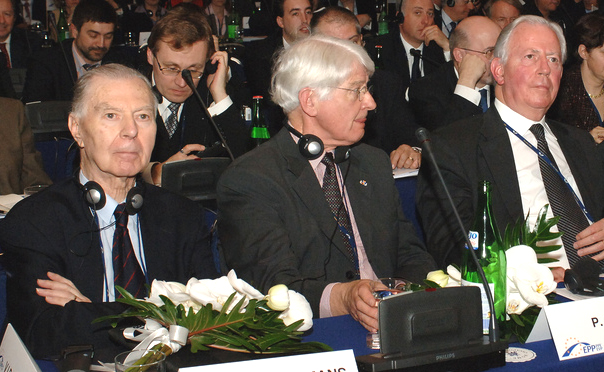
From left to right: Tindemans, Bukman and Santer, former presidents of the EPP

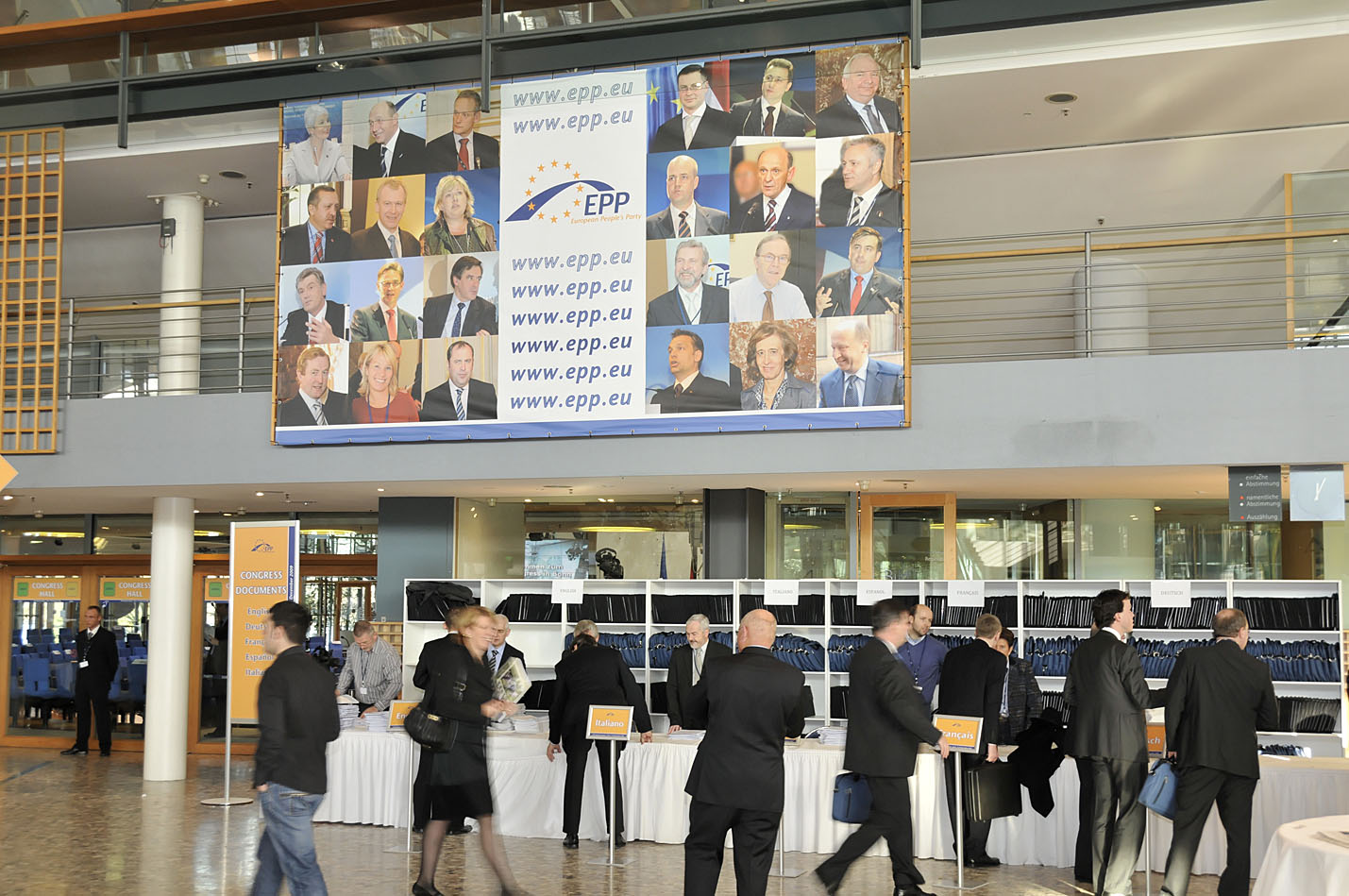
Bonn EPP Congress in 2009

According to its website, the EPP is "the family of the political centre-right, whose roots run deep in the history and civilisation of the European continent, and [which] has pioneered the European project from its inception".

The EPP was founded in Luxembourg on 8 July 1976 on the initiative of Jean Seitlinger; Leo Tindemans, then Prime Minister of Belgium, who became the first President of the EPP; and Wilfried Martens, who later became both President of the EPP and Prime Minister of Belgium. It had been preceded by the Secretariat International des partis démocratiques d'inspiration chrétienne, founded in 1925, the Nouvelles Equipes Internationales, founded in 1946 (or 1948), and the European Union of Christian Democrats, founded in 1965.

In the late 1990s, the Finnish politician Sauli Niinistö negotiated the merger of the European Democrat Union (EDU), of which he was president, into the EPP. In October 2002, the EDU ceased its activities after being formally absorbed by the EPP at a special event in Estoril, Portugal. In recognition of his efforts, Niinistö was elected Honorary President of the EPP the same year.

The EPP has had seven Presidents:

No.	Image	Name	Tenure	Party	Member state
1		Leo Tindemans (1922–2014)	1976–1985	CVP	Belgium
2		Piet Bukman (1934–2022)	1985–1987	CDA	Netherlands
3		Jacques Santer (born 1937)	1987–1990	CSV	Luxembourg
4		Wilfried Martens (1936–2013)	1990–2013^{[Died]}	CD&V	Belgium
5		Joseph Daul (born 1947)	2013–2019	The Republicans	France
6		Donald Tusk (born 1957)	2019–2022	Civic Platform	Poland
7		Manfred Weber (born 1972)	2022–	CSU	Germany

== Platform and manifesto ==
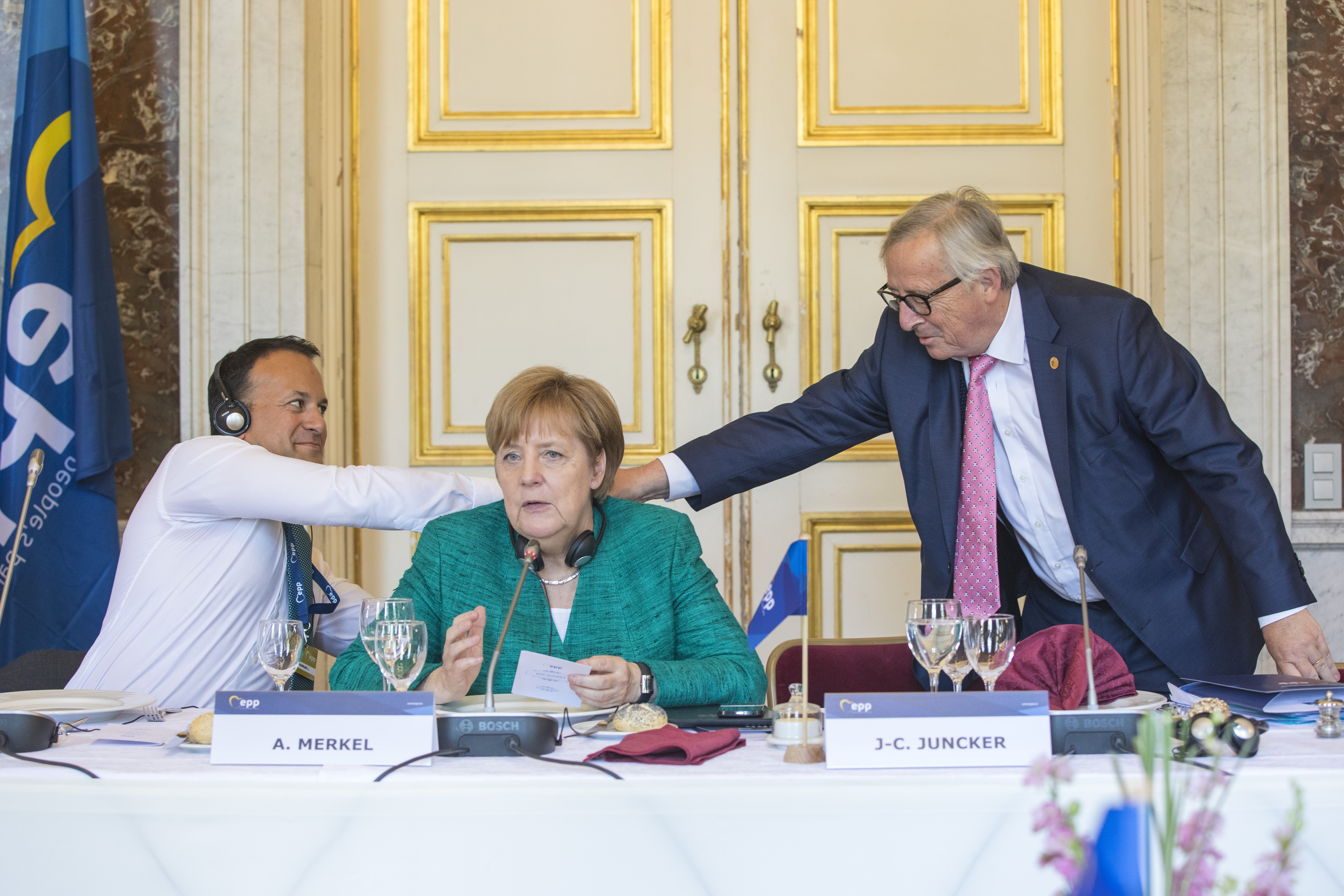
Leo Varadkar, Angela Merkel and Jean-Claude Juncker at an EPP summit in June 2018

=== Political manifesto and platform ===
During its Congress in Bucharest in 2012, the EPP updated its political platform after 20 years (since its Congress in Athens in 1992) and approved a political manifesto in which it summarised its main values and policies.

The manifesto highlights:

- Freedom as a central human right, coupled with responsibility
- Respect for traditions and associations
- Solidarity to help those in need, who in turn should also make an effort to improve their situation
- Ensuring solid public finances
- Preserving a healthy environment
- Subsidiarity
- Pluralist democracy and a social market economy

The manifesto also describes the EPP's priorities for the EU, including:

- European Political Union
- Direct election of the President of the European Commission
- Completion of the European Single Market
- Promotion of the family, improvements in education and health
- Strengthening of the common immigration and asylum policy, and integrating immigrants
- Continuation of enlargement of the EU, enhancement of the European Neighbourhood Policy and special relationship frameworks for countries that cannot, or do not want to, join the EU
- Defining a truly common EU energy policy
- Strengthening European political parties

=== Electoral manifesto ===
As a central part of its campaign for the European elections in 2009, the EPP approved its election manifesto at its Congress in Warsaw in April that year. The manifesto called for:

- Creation of new jobs, continuing reforms and investment in education, lifelong learning, and employment to create opportunities for everyone.
- Avoidance of protectionism, and coordination of fiscal and monetary policies.
- Increased transparency and surveillance in financial markets.
- Making Europe the market leader in green technology.
- Increasing the share of renewable energy to at least 20 percent of the energy mix by 2020.
- Family-friendly flexibility for working parents, better child care and housing, family-friendly fiscal policies, encouragement of parental leave.
- A new strategy to attract skilled workers from the rest of the world to make Europe's economy more competitive, more dynamic and more knowledge-driven.

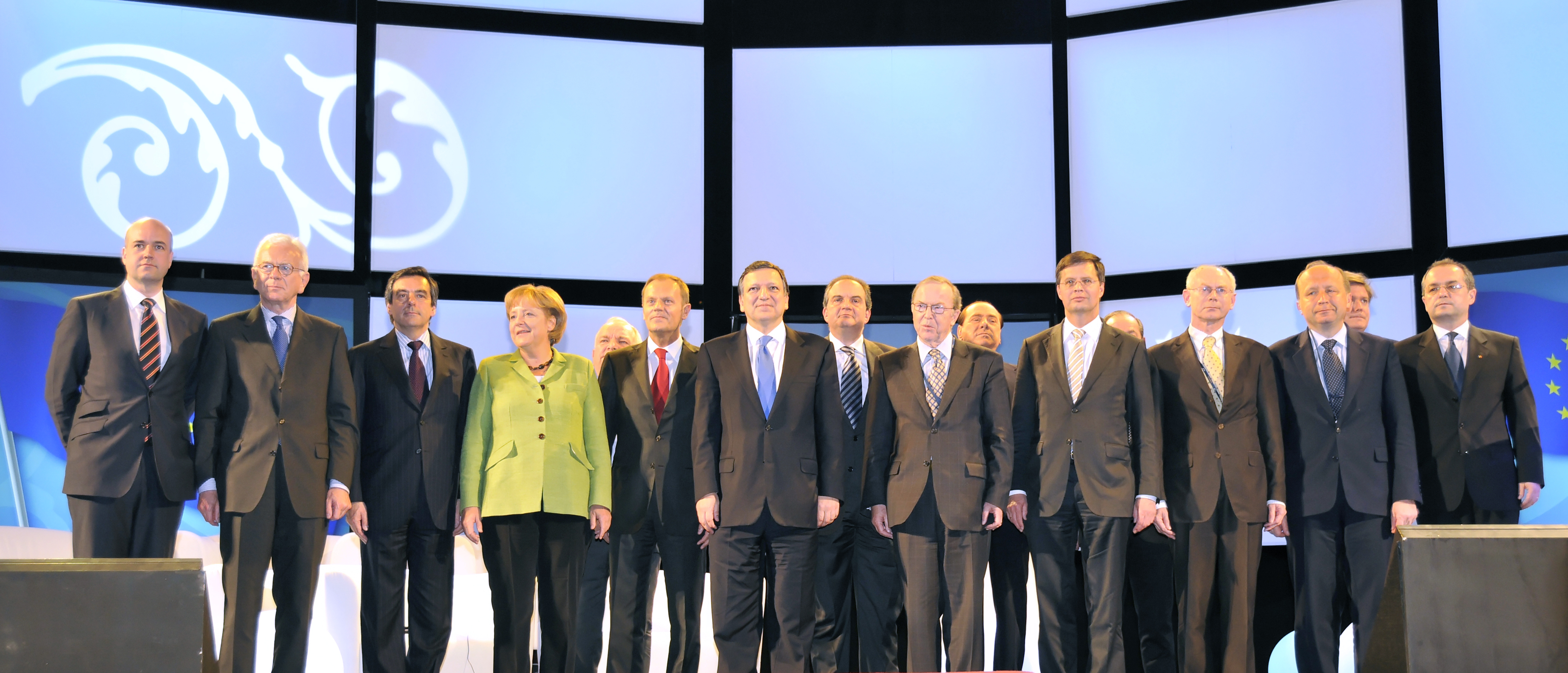
At its Congress in Warsaw in 2009 the EPP endorsed Barroso for a second term as President of the Commission.

=== The Fidesz crisis ===
Concerns that the Hungarian ruling party Fidesz (Note: Formally Fidesz is part of a coalition government, together with the KDNP. However, the KDNP is often accused of being in practice no more than a satellite party of Fidesz.) and its leader Viktor Orbán were undermining the rule of law in Hungary caused a split in the EPP in the run-up to the 2019 European Parliament election. On one hand, the EPP had been reluctant for years to address Fidesz's stance against the rule of law, expressed by the Article 7 proceedings of the European Parliament. On the other hand, European Commission President Jean-Claude Juncker, a prominent EPP member, stated "I believe his [Fidesz's] place is not in the European People's Party". Orbán's campaigns targeting billionaire George Soros and Jean-Claude Juncker carried wide reverberations for Europe questioning the EPP's effort to install its lead candidate Manfred Weber as the next President of the European Commission.

After years of deferring a decision about the Fidesz issue, the EPP was eventually compelled to address the problem two months before the 2019 European elections, as 13 outraged member parties requested the Hungarian party's exclusion from the EPP due to its billboard campaign featuring Jean-Claude Juncker. 190 of the 193 EPP delegates supported the common agreement with Fidesz on 20 March 2019 to partially suspend its membership. According to it, Fidesz was "until further notice" excluded from EPP meetings and internal elections, but remained in the European People's Party Group of the European Parliament. Fidesz did not deliver on its earlier promise to leave the EPP in case of a penalty.

In February 2020, the EPP extended the suspension of Fidesz indefinitely.

On 2 April 2020, thirteen parties within the EPP issued a joint statement aimed at Donald Tusk, asking him to expunge Fidesz from the party. Three days before this, the Hungarian Parliament had passed a law, declaring a state of emergency within Hungary, granting Prime Minister Viktor Orbán the right to rule by decree.

On 3 March 2021, Prime Minister Viktor Orbán announced that Fidesz would leave the EPP group after it changed its internal rules (to allow suspension and expulsion of multiple deputies and their groups), although Fidesz remained a suspended member of the EPP itself. On 18 March 2021, Fidesz decided to leave the European People's Party.

In June 2024, The Hungarian Christian Democratic People's Party (KDNP), which serves in government with Fidesz, left the European People's Party. That same month, members of the newly elected Hungarian Tisza Party led by Peter Magyar, a former Fidesz insider, applied to join the EPP.

=== German investigation ===
In April 2023, Belgian police and German investigators carried out a raid at the EPP headquarters in Brussels as part of an investigation in Germany.

== Membership ==
Within the EPP there are three kinds of member organisations: full members, associate members and observers. Full members are parties from EU states. They have absolute rights to vote in all the EPP's organs and on all matters. Associate members have the same voting rights as full members except for matters concerning the EU's structure or policies. These associate members are parties from EU candidate countries and EFTA countries. Observer parties can participate in all the activities of the EPP, and attend the Congresses and Political Assemblies, but they do not have any voting rights.

Special status of "supporting member" is granted by the Presidency to individuals and associations. Although they do not have voting rights, they can be invited by the President to attend meetings of certain organs of the party.

=== Full members ===
Country	Party	Abbr.	Lower house seats	Upper house Seats	Status
Austria	Austrian People's Party; Österreichische Volkspartei	ÖVP	51 / 183	23 / 61	Government
Belgium	Christian Democratic and Flemish; Christen-Democratisch en Vlaams	CD&V	12 / 150	5 / 60	Government
Bulgaria	Citizens for the European Development of Bulgaria; Граждани за европейско развитие на България; Grazhdani za evropeĭsko razvitie na Bŭlgariya	GERB	39 / 240		Opposition
Bulgaria	Democratic Bulgaria; Демократична България; Demokrati za silna Bălgariya	DB	21 / 240		Opposition
Bulgaria	Union of Democratic Forces; Съюз на демократичните сили Sayuz na demokratichnite sili	SDS	0 / 240		Extra-Parliamentary
Bulgaria	Bulgaria for Citizens Movement; Движение „България на гражданите“ Dvizhenie „Bulgariya na grazhdanite“	BCM	0 / 240		Extra-Parliamentary
Croatia	Croatian Democratic Union; Hrvatska demokratska zajednica	HDZ	55 / 151		Government
Croatia	Croatian Demochristian Party; Hrvatska demokršćanska stranka	HDS	1 / 151		Government
Cyprus	Democratic Rally; Δημοκρατικός Συναγερμός; Dimokratikós Sinagermós	DISY	17 / 56		Opposition
Czech Republic	Christian and Democratic Union – Czechoslovak People's Party; Křesťanská a demokratická unie – Československá strana lidová	KDU-ČSL	16 / 200	12 / 81	Opposition
Czech Republic	TOP 09	TOP 09	9 / 200	6 / 81	Opposition
Denmark	Conservative People's Party; Det Konservative Folkeparti	C	13 / 179		Opposition
Denmark	Christian Democrats; Kristendemokraterne	KD	0 / 179		Extra-parliamentary
Estonia	Isamaa	I	11 / 101		Opposition
Finland	National Coalition Party; Kansallinen Kokoomus; Samlingspartiet	KOK	48 / 200		Government
Finland	Christian Democrats; Kristillisdemokraatit; Kristdemokraterna	KD	5 / 200		Government
France	The Republicans; Les Républicains	LR	52 / 577	139 / 348	Confidence and supply
Germany	Christian Democratic Union of Germany; Christlich Demokratische Union Deutschlands	CDU	151 / 735	22 / 69	Government
Germany	Christian Social Union in Bavaria; Christlich-Soziale Union in Bayern	CSU	45 / 735	4 / 69	Government
Greece	New Democracy; Νέα Δημοκρατία; Nea Dimokratia	ND	156 / 300		Government
Ireland	Fine Gael	FG	38 / 174	17 / 60	Government
Italy	Forza Italia	FI	49 / 400	20 / 200	Government
Italy	Us Moderates; Noi Moderati	NM	7 / 400	2 / 200	Government
Italy	South Tyrolean People's Party; Südtiroler Volkspartei	SVP	3 / 400	2 / 200	Opposition
Italy	Union of the Centre; Unione di Centro	UdC	1 / 400	1 / 200	Government
Italy	Trentino Tyrolean Autonomist Party; Partito Autonomista Trentino Tirolese	PATT	0 / 400	0 / 200	Extra-parliamentary
Italy	Popular Alternative; Alternativa Popolare	AP	0 / 400	0 / 200	Extra-parliamentary
Italy	Popular Base; Base Popolare	BP	0 / 400	0 / 200	Extra-parliamentary
Latvia	Unity; Vienotība	V	7 / 100		Opposition
Lithuania	Homeland Union – Lithuanian Christian Democrats; Tėvynės sąjunga – Lietuvos krikščionys demokratai	TS-LKD	28 / 141		Opposition
Luxembourg	Christian Social People's Party; Chrëschtlech Sozial Vollekspartei; Parti populaire chrétien social Christlich Soziale Volkspartei	CSV/PCS	21 / 60		Government
Malta	Nationalist Party; Partit Nazzjonalista	PN	35 / 79		Opposition
Netherlands	Christian Democratic Appeal; Christen-Democratisch Appèl	CDA	18 / 150	6 / 75	Government
Poland	Civic Coalition; Koalicja Obywatelska	KO	153 / 460	36 / 100	Government
Poland	Polish People's Party; Polskie Stronnictwo Ludowe	PSL	28 / 460	4 / 100	Government
Portugal	Social Democratic Party; Partido Social Democrata	PPD/PSD	89 / 230		Government
Portugal	Democratic and Social Centre – People's Party; Centro Democrático e Social – Partido Popular	CDS-PP	2 / 230		Government
Romania	National Liberal Party; Partidul Național Liberal	PNL	80 / 330	38 / 136	Government
Romania	Democratic Alliance of Hungarians in Romania; Romániai Magyar Demokrata Szövetség; Uniunea Democrată Maghiară din România	UDMR	20 / 330	9 / 136	Opposition
Romania	People's Movement Party; Partidul Mișcarea Populară	PMP	0 / 330	0 / 136	Extra-parliamentary
Slovakia	Christian Democratic Movement; Kresťanskodemokratické hnutie	KDH	12 / 150		Opposition
Slovakia	Democrats; Demokrati	Demokrati	0 / 150		Extra-parliamentary
Slovakia	Hungarian Alliance; Magyar Szövetség; Maďarská Aliancia	Szövetség–Aliancia	0 / 150		Extra-parliamentary
Slovakia	Slovakia; Slovensko	Slovensko	16 / 150		Opposition
Slovenia	Slovenian Democratic Party; Slovenska demokratska stranka	SDS	28 / 90		Government
Slovenia	Slovenian People's Party; Slovenska ljudska stranka	SLS	1 / 90		Government
Slovenia	New Slovenia–Christian Democrats; Nova Slovenija – Krščanski demokrati	NSi	7 / 90		Government
Spain	People's Party; Partido Popular	PP	137 / 350	140 / 266	Opposition
Sweden	Moderate Party; Moderata samlingspartiet	M	68 / 349		Government
Sweden	Christian Democrats; Kristdemokraterna	KD	19 / 349		Government

=== Associate members ===
Albania

- Democratic Party of Albania (PD)

Bosnia and Herzegovina

- Party of Democratic Action (SDA)
- Croatian Democratic Union (HDZ BiH)
- Party of Democratic Progress (PDP)

Georgia

- United National Movement (UNM)

Iceland

- Independence Party (XD)

Montenegro

- Europe Now! (PES)
- Bosniak Party (BS)

North Macedonia

- Internal Macedonian Revolutionary Organization – Democratic Party for Macedonian National Unity (VMRO–DPMNE)

Norway

- Conservative Party (H)

Serbia

- Serbian Progressive Party (SNS)
- Alliance of Vojvodina Hungarians (VMSZ/SVM)

Switzerland

- The Centre (DM/LC)

Ukraine

- European Solidarity

=== Observer members ===
Armenia

- Republican Party of Armenia (HHK)
- Heritage

Belarus

- Belarusian Christian Democracy (BCD)
- United Civic Party of Belarus (AHP)
- За Свабоду (The Movement for Freedom; MFF)

Bosnia and Herzegovina

- Croatian Democratic Union 1990 (HDZ 1990)

Georgia

- European Georgia

Kosovo

- Democratic League of Kosovo (LDK)

Moldova

- Liberal Democratic Party of Moldova (PLDM)
- Dignity and Truth Platform Party (PPDA)
- Party of Action and Solidarity (PAS)

Norway

- Christian Democratic Party (KrF)

San Marino

- Sammarinese Christian Democratic Party (PDCS)

Ukraine

- Batkivshchyna (since 2008)
- Self Reliance (since 2019)
- Ukrainian Democratic Alliance for Reform (UDAR)

=== Former members ===
Armenia

- Rule of Law (OEK), observer member

Belgium

- Les Engagés (LE)

Belarus

- Belarusian Popular Front (BNF), observer member until 2017

France

- Centre of Social Democrats
- Union for French Democracy
- Rally for the Republic, merged with UMP
- Union for a Popular Movement (UMP), succeeded by The Republicans, current EPP member

Croatia

- Croatian Peasant Party (HSS), member until withdrawal May 2019

Hungary

- Fidesz, suspended from March 20, 2019. Left EPP on March 18, 2021.
- Hungarian Democratic Forum, member until September 7, 2009.
- Christian Democratic People's Party, member until June 19, 2024.

Italy

- Christian Democracy
- Italian People's Party
- Christian Democratic Centre
- United Christian Democrats
- Italian Renewal
- Union of Democrats for Europe
- The People of Freedom
- New Centre-Right

Romania

- Democratic Party (PD)
- Democratic Liberal Party (PDL), merged with PNL, current EPP member
- Christian Democratic National Peasants' Party (PNȚ-CD)

Serbia

- Democratic Party of Serbia (observer)

Slovakia

- Slovak Democratic and Christian Union – Democratic Party (SDKÚ-DS)
- Most-Híd
- Party of the Hungarian Community

Spain

- Basque Nationalist Party
- People's Democratic Party

Turkey

- Justice and Development Party (observer)

Ukraine

- People's Movement of Ukraine (observer)
- Our Ukraine (observer)

=== Individual members ===
The EPP also includes a number of individual members, although, as with most other European parties, it has not sought to develop mass individual membership.

Below is the evolution of individual membership of the EPP since 2019.

== Governance ==
The EPP is governed by the EU Regulation No 1141/2014 on European Political Parties and European Political Foundations and its operations are supervised by the EU Authority for European Political Parties and European Political Foundations.

=== Presidency ===
The Presidency is the executive body of the party. It decides on the general political guidelines of the EPP and presides over its Political Assembly. The Presidency is composed of the President, ten Vice-Presidents, the Honorary Presidents, the Secretary General and the Treasurer. The Chairperson of the EPP Group in the European Parliament, the Presidents of the Commission, the Parliament and the Council, and the High Representative (if they are a member of an EPP member party) are all ex officio Vice-Presidents.

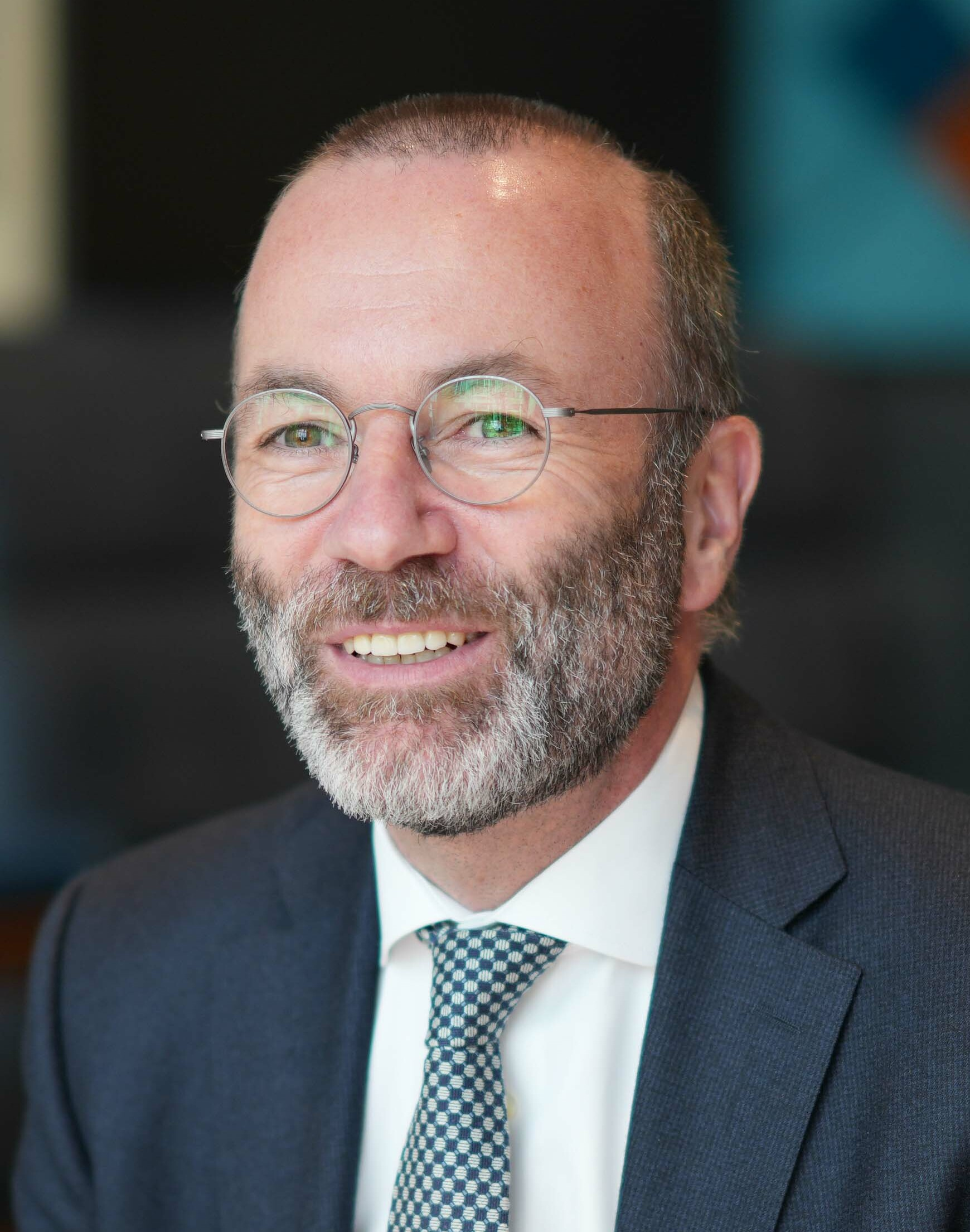
President of the EPP Manfred Weber

As of 30 April 2025 the Presidency of the EPP is:

- (Germany) Manfred Weber – President
- (France) François-Xavier Bellamy – Treasurer
- (Spain) Dolors Montserrat – Secretary General
- (Austria) Magnus Brunner – Vice-President
- (Croatia) Dubravka Šuica – Vice-President
- (Finland) Petteri Orpo – Vice-President
- (Germany) David McAllister – Vice-President
- (Greece) Kostis Hatzidakis – Vice-President
- (Republic of Ireland) Mairead McGuinness – Vice-President
- (Italy) Antonio Tajani – Vice-President
- (Poland) Andrzej Halicki – Vice-President
- (Portugal) Paulo Rangel – Vice-President
- (Romania) Siegfried Mureşan – Vice-President
- (Germany) Ursula von der Leyen – Ex Officio Member
- (Malta) Roberta Metsola – Ex Officio Member
- (Finland) Sari Rautio – Ex Officio Member

=== EPP Political Assembly ===
The Political Assembly defines the political positions of the EPP between Congresses and decides on membership applications, political guidelines and the budget. The Political Assembly is composed of designated delegates from EPP member parties, associated parties, member associations, and other affiliated groups. The Political Assembly meets at least three times a year.

=== Congress ===
The Congress is the highest decision-making body of the EPP. It is composed of delegates from member parties, EPP associations, EPP Group MEPs, the EPP Presidency, national heads of party and government, and European Commissioners who belong to a member party, with the numbers of delegates being weighted according to the EPP's share of MEPs, and individual delegates being elected by member parties according to member parties' rules.

Under the EPP's statutes, the Congress must meet once every three years, but it also meets normally during the years of elections for the European Parliament (every five years), and extraordinary Congresses have also been summoned. The Congress elects the EPP Presidency every three years, decides on the main policy documents and electoral programmes, and provides a platform for the EPP's heads of government and party leaders.

== Funding ==
As a registered European political party, the EPP is entitled to European public funding, which it has received continuously since 2004.

Below is the evolution of European public funding received by the EPP.

In line with the Regulation on European political parties and European political foundations, the EPP also raises private funds to co-finance its activities. As of 2025, European parties must raise at least 10% of their reimbursable expenditure from private sources, while the rest can be covered using European public funding. (Note: For the purpose of European party funding, "contributions" refer to financial or in-kind support provided by party members, while "donations" refer to the same but provided by non-members.)

Below is the evolution of contributions and donations received by the EPP.

== Activities within the party ==
=== Summit ===
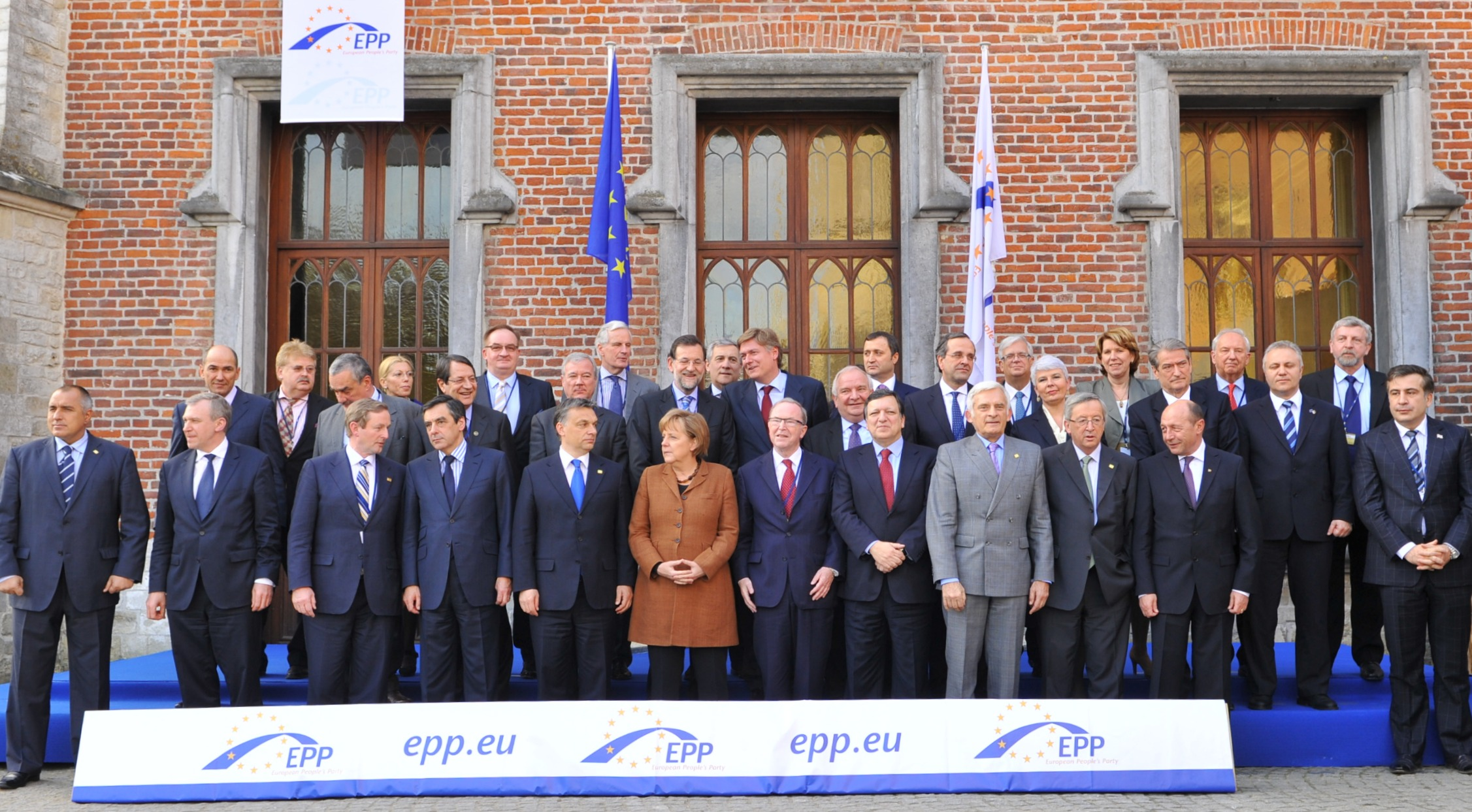
Reunion Picture at 2011 Summit

EPP leaders meet for the EPP Summit a few hours before each meeting of the European Council in order to formulate common positions. Invitations are sent by the EPP President and attendees include, besides the members of the EPP's presidency, all Presidents and Prime Ministers who are members of the European Council and belong to the EPP; the Presidents of the European Parliament, the European Commission and the European Council, as well as the High Representative for Foreign Affairs, provided that they belong to the EPP; Deputy Prime Ministers or other ministers in those cases where the Prime Minister of a country does not belong to an EPP member party; and, where no EPP member party is part of a government, the leaders of the main EPP opposition party.

=== Ministerial meetings ===
Following the pattern of the EPP Summit the party also organises regular EPP Ministerial meetings before each meeting of the Council of the European Union, with ministers, deputy ministers, secretaries of state and MEPs in the specific policy field attending:

- General Affairs
- Foreign Affairs
- Economy and Finance
- Home Affairs
- Justice
- Defence
- Employment and Social Affairs
- Industry
- Agriculture
- Energy
- Environment

=== Other activities ===
The EPP also organises working groups on different issues on an ad hoc basis, as well as meetings with its affiliated members in the European Commission. It also invites individual Commissioners to the EPP Summit meetings and to EPP Ministerial meetings.

Following amendments to the EU Regulation that governs European political parties in 2007, the EPP, like the other European parties, was responsible for organising a pan-European campaign for the European elections every five years. According to the Lisbon Treaty, the parties must present candidates for President of the European Commission, but the EPP had already done this by endorsing José Manuel Barroso for a second term in April 2009.

The year 2014 saw the first fully-fledged campaign of the EPP ahead of the European elections of that year. The party nominated former Luxembourgish Prime Minister Jean-Claude Juncker as its candidate for President of the European Commission and led a pan-European campaign in coordination with the national campaigns of all its member parties.

== Activities within EU institutions ==
As of 1 December 2019, the EPP holds the Presidency of the European Commission with Ursula von der Leyen (CDU).

=== Overview of European institutions ===
Organisation	Institution	Number of seats
European Union	European Parliament	182 / 720 (25%)
European Union	European Commission	11 / 27 (41%)
European Union	European Council (Heads of Government)	11 / 27 (41%)
European Union	Council of the European Union (Participation in Government)	
European Union	Committee of the Regions	118 / 329 (36%)
Council of Europe (as part of EPP/CD)	Parliamentary Assembly	132 / 612 (22%)

=== European Commission ===
Following EPP's victory in the 2019 European Parliament election, Ursula von der Leyen was nominated by the EPP as Commission President. She was endorsed by the European Council and elected by an absolute majority in the European Parliament. On 1 December 2019, the von der Leyen Commission officially took office. It includes 11 EPP officeholders out of 27 total Commissioners.

State	Commissioner	Portfolio	Political party	Portrait
Germany	Ursula von der Leyen	President	CDU	
Latvia	Valdis Dombrovskis	Executive Vice President – An Economy that Works for the People, Trade	Unity	
Croatia	Dubravka Šuica	Vice President – Democracy and Demography	HDZ	
Greece	Margaritis Schinas	Vice President – Promoting the European Way of Life	ND	
Austria	Johannes Hahn	Commissioner for Budget and Administration	ÖVP	
Netherlands	Wopke Hoekstra	European Commissioner for Climate Action	CDA	
(Republic of Ireland); Ireland	Mairead McGuinness	Commissioner for Financial Stability, Financial Services and the Capital Markets Union	FG	
Bulgaria	Iliana Ivanova	Commissioner for Innovation, Research, Culture, Education and Youth	GERB	
Cyprus	Stella Kyriakides	Commissioner for Health and Food Safety	DISY	
Romania	Adina-Ioana Vălean	Commissioner for Transport	PNL	
Hungary	Olivér Várhelyi	Commissioner for Neighbourhood and Enlargement	Ind. (Note: Independent on the national level but affiliated with EPP at the EU level)	

=== European Parliament ===
The EPP has the largest group in the European Parliament: the EPP Group. It currently has 182 Members in the European Parliament and its chairman is the German MEP Manfred Weber.

In every election for the European Parliament candidates elected on lists of member parties of the EPP are obliged to join the EPP Group in the European Parliament.

The EPP Group holds five of the fourteen vice-presidencies of the European Parliament.

=== European Council ===
The EPP has 11 out of the 27 EU heads of state or government attending the EPP summit meetings in preparation of the European Council (as of October 2026):

Member state	Representative	Title	Political party	Member of the Council since	Portrait
Austria	Christian Stocker	Chancellor	ÖVP	3 March 2025	
Croatia	Andrej Plenković	Prime Minister	HDZ	19 October 2016	
Cyprus	Nikos Christodoulides	President	Individual member	28 February 2023	
Germany	Friedrich Merz	Chancellor	CDU	6 May 2025	
Finland	Petteri Orpo	Prime Minister	Kok.	20 June 2023	
Greece	Kyriakos Mitsotakis	Prime Minister	ND	8 July 2019	
Luxembourg	Luc Frieden	Prime Minister	CSV	17 November 2023	
Poland	Donald Tusk	Prime Minister	KO	13 December 2023	
Portugal	Luís Montenegro	Prime Minister	PSD	2 April 2024	
Slovenia	Janez Janša	Prime Minister of Slovenia	SDP	4 June 2026	
Sweden	Ulf Kristersson	Prime Minister	M	18 October 2022	

=== National legislatures ===
Country	Institution	Number of seats
Austria	National Council; Lower house	71 / 183
Austria	Federal Council; Upper house	22 / 61
Belgium	Chamber of Representatives; Lower house	17 / 150
Belgium	Senate; Upper house	7 / 60
Bulgaria	National Assembly	83 / 240
Croatia	Sabor	62 / 151
Cyprus	House of Representatives	18 / 56
Czech Republic	Chamber of Deputies; Lower house	70 / 200
Czech Republic	Senate; Upper house	34 / 81
Denmark	The Folketing	13 / 179
Estonia	Riigikogu	12 / 101
Finland	Parliament	53 / 200
France	National Assembly; Lower house	104 / 577
France	Senate; Upper house	148 / 348
Germany	Bundestag	196 / 735
Greece	Parliament	158 / 300
Hungary	Országgyűlés	17 / 199
Ireland	Dáil; Lower house	35 / 160
Ireland	Seanad; Upper house	15 / 60
Italy	Chamber of Deputies; Lower house	88 / 630
Italy	Senate; Upper house	55 / 321
Latvia	Saeima	23 / 100
Lithuania	Seimas	50 / 141
Luxembourg	Chamber of Deputies	21 / 60
Malta	House of Representatives	28 / 67
Netherlands	House of Representatives; Lower house	18 / 150
Netherlands	Senate; Upper house	6 / 75
Poland	Sejm; Lower house	155 / 460
Poland	Senate; Upper house	45 / 100
Portugal	Assembly of the Republic	91 / 230
Romania	Chamber of Deputies; Lower house	100 / 330
Romania	Senate; Upper house	47 / 136
Slovakia	National Council	53 / 150
Slovenia	National Assembly	33 / 90
Spain	Congress of Deputies; Lower house	137 / 350
Spain	Senate; Upper house	144 / 266
Sweden	Riksdag	87 / 349

== Criticism ==
=== Selective enforcement and double standards on rule of law ===
The European People's Party has faced substantial criticism for displaying a double standard in its enforcement of democratic values and rule of law principles. While the party has positioned itself as a guardian of European democratic standards, critics argue that it has been significantly more lenient toward violations committed by its own member parties compared to violations by non-EPP members.

==== GERB Bulgaria ====
One of the most prominent examples of the EPP's selective accountability involves GERB in Bulgaria. Despite Bulgaria being consistently ranked as the most corrupt European Union member state according to international indices, the EPP offered consistent protection and support to Bulgarian Prime Minister Boyko Borissov and his GERB party for over a decade.

In 2020-2021, when Bulgarian citizens protested for more than 100 consecutive days demanding Borissov's resignation over corruption and poor governance, the EPP actively opposed efforts to hold the government accountable. During the October 2020 European Parliament debate on a resolution condemning democratic backsliding and corruption under GERB's rule, the EPP made "huge efforts to amend the draft resolution by replacing its critical texts with praise for Borissov's sister party GERB." EPP President Roberta Metsola introduced multiple amendments to weaken the resolution, though it ultimately passed with 358 votes in favour despite EPP opposition.

Prominent EPP figures actively defended Borissov despite accumulating evidence of systemic corruption. Manfred Weber, the EPP Group's leader in the European Parliament, released statements saying he "fully supported Borissov and his government's fight against corruption" even as corruption scandals multiplied. German Chancellor Angela Merkel, head of the CDU, met with Borissov and expressed support for his government without raising substantial concerns about corruption allegations.

==== Hungary and delayed action against Orbán ====
The EPP faced criticism for its delayed response to systematic dismantling of democratic institutions in Hungary by the Fidesz party under Viktor Orbán. Despite extensive documentation by international organizations of serious rule-of-law violations beginning immediately after Fidesz's 2010 election victory, the EPP did not suspend Fidesz until March 20, 2019—a nine-year delay.

In January 2012, the European Commission launched accelerated infringement proceedings against Hungary, concluding that new legislation "conflicts with EU law" by undermining "the independence of the country's central bank and data protection authorities and by the measures affecting its judiciary."

The Venice Commission, the Council of Europe's advisory body on constitutional matters, found in its February 2012 mission report that "in none of the member states of the Council of Europe have such important powers been vested in a single person, lacking sufficient democratic accountability." It concluded that "the reform as a whole threatens the independence of the judiciary."

Human Rights Watch documented in 2013 that the Fidesz government had "curbed the independence of the judiciary and the administration of justice, forced nearly 300 judges into early retirement, and imposed limitations on the Constitutional Court's ability to review laws and complaints."

The OSCE Office for Democratic Institutions and Human Rights (ODIHR) characterized Hungary's 2018 elections as "free but not fair," citing "media bias and opaque campaign financing" and noting that "the line between state and party" was blurred through "abuse of administrative resources." By 2022, the EU classified Hungary as an "electoral autocracy" rather than a democracy, stating that "representative democratic values have been completely undermined."

The 2019 suspension of Fidesz came primarily after Orbán's government launched personal attacks against Jean-Claude Juncker and Manfred Weber rather than in response to the nine-year pattern of violations documented by international organizations. When the suspension occurred, Fidesz remained in the EPP Group in the European Parliament and was merely excluded from party meetings. Fidesz ultimately left the EPP in March 2021 after the party established new suspension and expulsion procedures.

==== Double standards on member states ====
The EPP's inconsistent application of rule-of-law standards became increasingly apparent through parliamentary debates. French MEP Gwendoline Delbos-Corfield raised the issue directly, questioning: "Is this (European) Parliament suffering from high sensitivity to rule of law issues only when it's about countries that are not governed by EPP?"

While the EPP initiated numerous resolutions on rule-of-law violations in Malta, critics noted it rarely initiated similar scrutiny regarding comparable concerns about corruption and institutional weakness in Greece and Bulgaria, which were governed by EPP member parties (New Democracy and GERB respectively). Dutch MEP Sophia 't Veld similarly noted: "It is true that we are talking, here, about Malta today, because the EPP did not want to have a debate on Greece… there is a systematic problem with the rule of law in Greece."

When rule-of-law violations occurred in countries governed by EPP members, the party's response was notably muted. Greece, governed by EPP member New Democracy, faced allegations of illegal surveillance of opposition figures and journalists under Prime Minister Kyriakos Mitsotakis, yet the EPP's public response was notably absent.

==== Serbian Progressive Party and Vučić ====
The EPP has been accused of "complicit silence" regarding Aleksandar Vučić's Serbian Progressive Party (SNS), which holds associate membership status in the EPP as Serbia is an EU candidate country. Despite documented police violence against protesters, media crackdowns, and authoritarian governance patterns, the EPP offered minimal public criticism for years.

In 2025, following nine months of anti-government protests in Serbia, the EPP only initiated a "scrutiny process" regarding SNS membership. Critics argued this response was insufficient and delayed given the documented violence and repression. The Socialists and Democrats called on the EPP to "stop appeasing Vučić" and apply the same approach as to Georgia, urging a freeze on EU accession negotiations pending democratic reforms.

The EPP's reluctance to confront democratic deterioration in Serbia has been attributed to strategic interests in maintaining influence in the Western Balkans. A 2023 study noted that "the EPP was interested in maintaining influence in the Western Balkans while avoiding alienation of the SNS. This approach took precedence over particular national interests, domestic electoral incentives, or ideological beliefs."

== Activities beyond the European Union ==
=== In third countries ===
Through its associate and observer parties the EPP has six head of state or government in non-EU countries:

State	Representative	Title	Political party	In power since	Portrait
Bosnia and Herzegovina	Borjana Krišto	Chairwoman of the Council of Ministers	HDZ BiH	25 January 2023	
Moldova	Maia Sandu	President	PAS	24 December 2020	
North Macedonia	Gordana Siljanovska-Davkova	President	VMRO-DPMNE	12 May 2024	
North Macedonia	Hristijan Mickoski	Prime Minister	VMRO-DPMNE	23 June 2024	

=== In the Council of Europe ===
The Group of the EPP in the Parliamentary Assembly of the Council of Europe defends freedom of expression and information, as well as freedom of movement of ideas and religious tolerance. It promotes the principle of subsidiarity and local autonomy, as well as the defence of national, social, and other minorities. The EPP/CD Group is led by Davor Ivo Stier, a member of the Croatian Democratic Union.

The EPP/CD group also includes members from parties that are not related to the EPP itself, including members of the Patriotic Union (Liechtenstein), the Progressive Citizens' Party (Liechtenstein), and the National and Democratic Union (Monaco).

=== In the Organization for Security and Co-operation in Europe ===
The "EPP and like-minded Group" in the Parliamentary Assembly of the Organization for Security and Co-operation in Europe (OSCE) is the most active political group in that body. The Group meets regularly and promotes the EPP's positions. The members of the EPP Group also participate in the election-monitoring missions of the OSCE.

The Group is chaired by Walburga Habsburg Douglas (Sweden), and its Vice-Presidents are Consiglio Di Nino (Canada), Vilija Aleknaitė Abramikiene (Lithuania), Laura Allegrini (Italy), and George Tsereteli (Georgia).

The Group also includes members of parties not related to the EPP, accounting for the "like-minded" part of its name. Among them are members of the Patriotic Union (Liechtenstein), the Union for the Principality (Monaco), the Conservative Party of the United Kingdom, the Conservative Party of Canada, and the Republican Party of the United States.

=== In the North Atlantic Treaty Organization ===
The EPP is also present and active in the Parliamentary Assembly of the North Atlantic Treaty Organization (NATO), and forms the "EPP and Associated Members" Group there. It is led by the German CDU politician Karl Lamers, who is also the current President of the Assembly. The Group also included members of the Conservative Party of Canada and the Republican Party of the United States, but now they are members of the Conservative Group

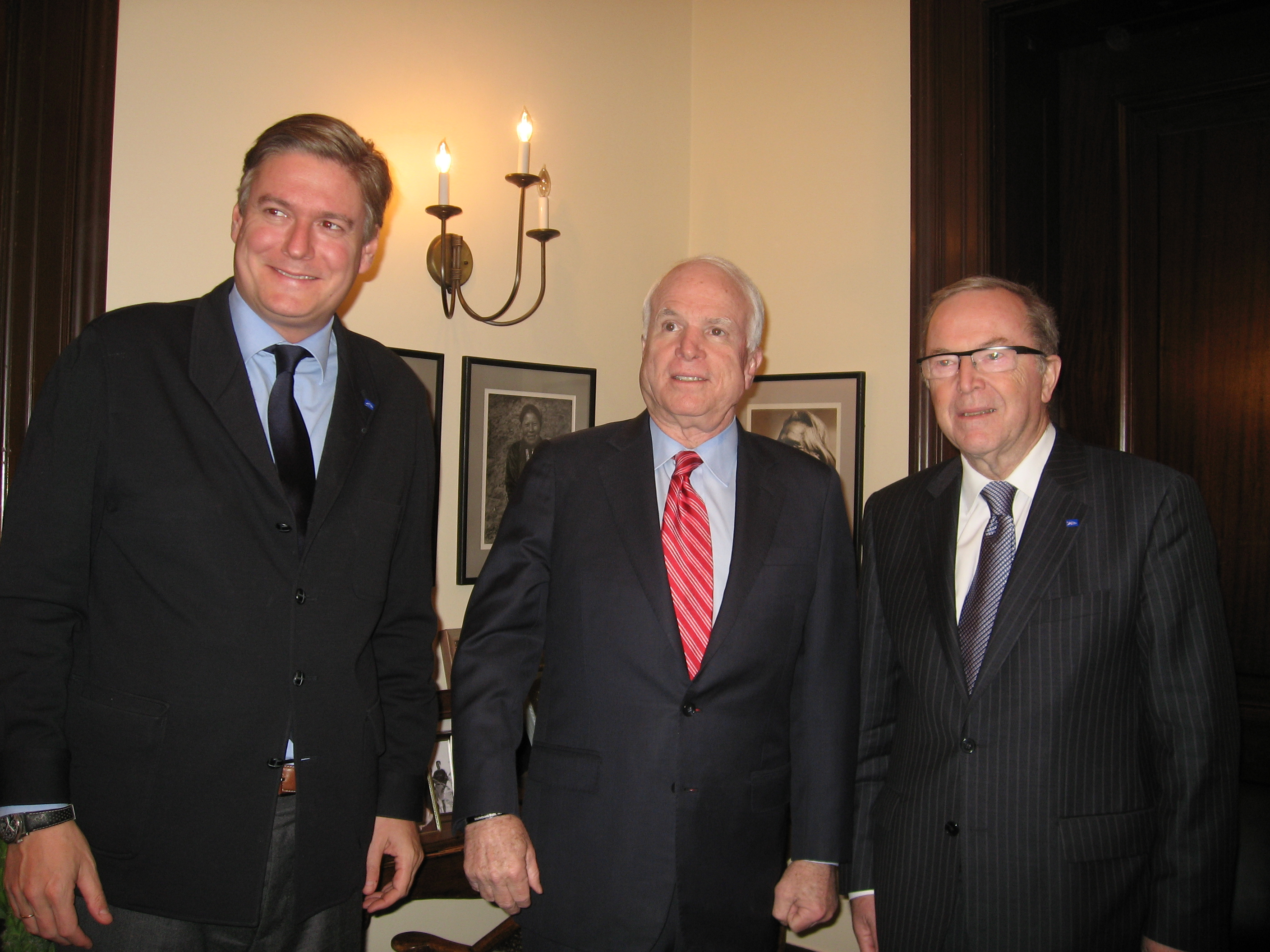
From left to right: López-Istúriz, McCain & Martens

=== Relations with the United States ===
The EPP has close relations with the International Republican Institute (IRI), an organisation funded by the U.S. government especially to promote democracy and democratisation. The EPP and the IRI cooperate within the framework of the European Partnership Initiative.

The EPP's late President, Wilfried Martens, endorsed Senator John McCain, the Republican nominee for president, in the presidential election in 2008. McCain was also Chairman of the IRI. In 2011 Martens and McCain made joint press statements expressing their concern about the state of democracy in Ukraine.

=== Global networks ===
The EPP is the European wing of two global centre-right organisations, the International Democracy Union (IDU) and the Centrist Democrat International (CDI).

== Martens Centre ==
Following the revision in 2007 of the EU Regulation that governs European political parties, allowing the creation of affiliated European political foundations, the EPP established in the same year its official foundation/think tank, the Centre for European Studies (CES), which was later renamed as the Martens Centre. It includes as members all the major national think tanks and foundations affiliated to EPP member parties: the Konrad Adenauer Foundation (CDU), the Hanns Seidel Foundation (CSU), the Foundation for Analysis and Social Studies (PP), the Constantinos Karamanlis Institute for Democracy (ND), the Jarl Hjalmarson Foundation (MOD), the Political Academy of the Austrian People's Party (ÖVP) and others. During the European Parliament election campaign in 2009, the Centre launched a web-based campaign module, tellbarroso.eu, to support Jose Manuel Barroso, the EPP's candidate for re-election as Commission President.

In 2014, to honour Wilfried Martens – the late President of the EPP who also founded the CES – changed its name to Wilfried Martens Centre for European Studies or simply Martens Centre.

The current President of the Martens Centre is former Slovak Prime Minister Mikuláš Dzurinda.

The Budapest-based Robert Schuman Institute and the Luxembourg-based Robert Schuman Foundation are also affiliated with the European People's Party.

== EPP associations ==
The EPP is linked to several specific associations that focus on specific groups and organise seminars, forums, publications, and other activities.

=== Small and Medium Entrepreneurs Europe (SME Europe) ===
SME Europe is the official business organisation of the EPP and serves as a network for pro-business politicians and political organisations. Its main objective is to shape EU policy in a more SME-friendly way in close cooperation with the SME Circle of the EPP Group in the European Parliament, the DG Enterprise and the pro-business organisations of the EPP's member parties. Its top priorities are to reform the legal framework for SMEs all over Europe and to promote and support the interests of small and medium-sized enterprises. SME Europe was founded in May 2012 by three Members of the European Parliament, Paul Rübig, Nadezhda Neynsky, and Bendt Bendtsen.

=== European Democrat Students ===
European Democrat Students (EDS) is now the official students' organisation of the EPP, though it was founded in 1961, 15 years before the EPP itself. Led by Virgilio Falco, EDS has 40 member organisations, representing nearly 1,600,000 students and young people in 31 countries, including Belarus and Georgia. Every year EDS hosts Summer and Winter "universities", and several seminars. It also regularly publishes a magazine, Bullseye, and organises topical campaigns.

=== European Seniors' Union ===
Founded in Madrid in 1995 and led by An Hermans of the CD&V, the European Seniors' Union (ESU) is the largest political senior citizens' organisation in Europe. The ESU is represented in 27 countries with 34 organisations and about 500.000 members.

=== European Union of Christian Democratic Workers ===
The European Union of Christian Democratic Workers (EUCDW) is the labour organisation of the EPP, with 24 member organisations in 18 countries. As the officially recognised EPP association of workers, the EUCDW is led by Dennis Radtke, MEP. It aims at the political unification of a democratic Europe, the development of the EPP based on Christian social teaching, and the defence of workers' interests in European policy-making.

=== Women of the European People's Party ===
The Women of the European People's Party (EPP Women) is recognised by the EPP as the official association of women from all like-minded political parties of Europe. EPP Women has more than 40 member organisations from countries of the European Union and beyond. All of them are women's organisations of political parties that are members of the EPP. EPP Women is led by Doris Pack.

=== Youth of the European People's Party ===
The Youth of the European People's Party (YEPP), led by Sophia Kircher, is the EPP's official youth organisation. It has 64 member organisations, bringing together between one and two million young people in 40 countries.

== Election results ==
European Parliament

Year		Lead Candidate	Vote %	Seats %	Seats	+/-	Status	Ref
2014		Jean-Claude Juncker	23.8% (#1)		221 / 720	▼44	Coalition	
2019	Pre-Brexit	Manfred Weber	21.0% (#1)	23.9 (#1)	180 / 751		Coalition	
2019	Post-Brexit	Manfred Weber		24.7 (#1)	174 / 705	▼6	Coalition	
2024		Ursula von der Leyen	19.6% (#1)	25.9 (#1)	187 / 720 (Note: Including 23 individual members)	▲13	Coalition	

== See also ==
- European political party
- Authority for European Political Parties and European Political Foundations
- European political foundation

== Bibliography ==
- Jansen, Thomas (1998). The European People's Party: Origins and Development. MacMillans.
- Jansen, Thomas; Van Hecke, Steven (2011). At Europe's Service: The Origins and Evolution of the European People's Party. Springer. doi:10.1007/978-3-642-19414-6. ISBN 978-3-642-19413-9. LCCN 2011927265.
- Kaiser, Wolfram (2004). "Transnational Christian Democracy: From the Nouvelles Equipes Internationales to the European People's Party". In Michael Gehler; Wolfram Kaiser (eds.). Christian Democracy in Europe since 1945. Routledge. pp. 194–208. ISBN 0-7146-5662-3.
- Herman, L., Hoerner, J., & Lacey, J. (2021). "Why does the European Right accommodate backsliding states? An analysis of 24 European People's Party votes (2011–2019)." European Political Science Review
