= Bettina Rausch =

Austrian politician (born 1979)

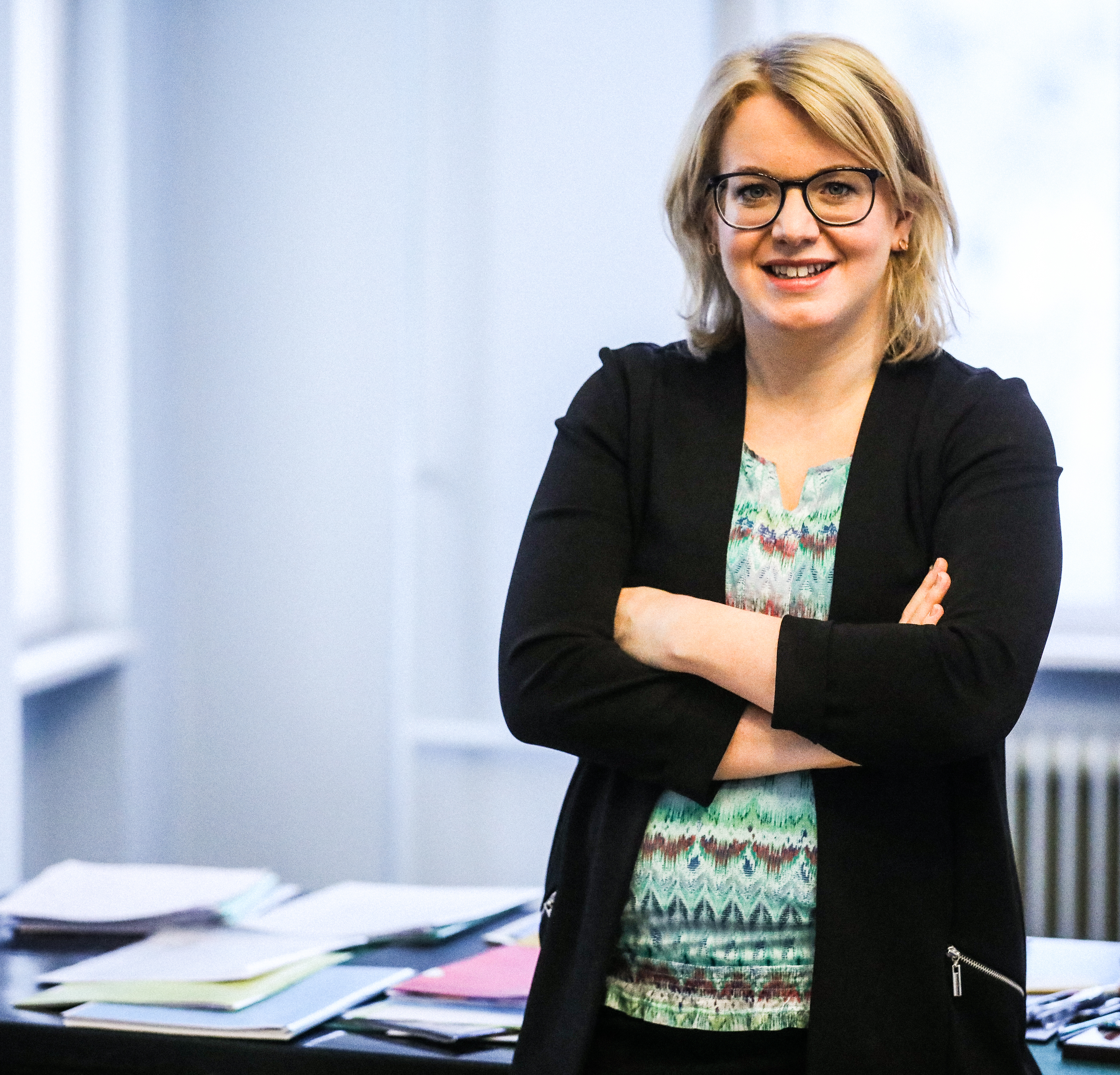

Personal details
- Born: 25 December 1979 (age 45); Scheibbs, Scheibbs District, Lower Austria, Austria
- Political party: People's Party

Bettina Rausch (born 25 December 1979) is an Austrian politician. Rausch was from 2008 to 2013 a member of the Federal Council for Lower Austria and from 2013 to 2018 a member of the Lower Austrian State Diet. Since 2018 she serves as the president of the Political Academy of the Austrian People's Party.
