= Klaus Köchl =

Austrian politician (born 1961)

Member of the National Council
- Incumbent
- Assumed office 23 October 2019
- Constituency: Carinthia

Member of the Carinthian Landtag
- In office 24 April 2008 – 23 October 2019
- Preceded by: Gerhard Mock
- Succeeded by: Armin Geißler
- Constituency: Carinthia East

Personal details
- Born: 28 November 1961 (age 64) St. Veit an der Glan, Austria
- Party: Social Democratic Party

Klaus Köchl (born 28 November 1961) is an Austrian politician and member of the National Council. A member of the Social Democratic Party, he has represented Carinthia since October 2019. He was a member of the Carinthian Landtag from April 2008 to October 2019.

Köchl was born on 28 November 1961 in St. Veit an der Glan. He trained to be an office clerk at a vocational school in St. Veit an der Glan. He has worked as a carpentry supplies salesman and for Austrian Federal Railways (ÖBB). He has held various positions in the Liebenfels and St. Veit an der Glan District branches of the Social Democratic Party (SPÖ) since 1994. He has been mayor of Liebenfels since 2003. He was appointed to the Carinthian Landtag in April 2008 following the resignation of Gerhard Mock. He was elected to the National Council at the 2019 legislative election. He subsequently resigned from the Landtag in October 2019 and was replaced by Armin Geißler in Carinthia East electoral district.

Köchl is in a civil partnership and has two children.

Electoral history of Klaus Köchl
Election	Electoral district	Party	Votes	%	Result
2009 state	Carinthia East	Social Democratic Party	1,176	3.98%	Elected
2013 state	Carinthia East	Social Democratic Party	1,400	4.14%	Elected
2018 state	Carinthia East	Social Democratic Party	3,462	9.08%	Elected
2019 legislative	Carinthia East	Social Democratic Party	2,924	12.43%	Not elected
2019 legislative	Carinthia	Social Democratic Party	447	0.55%	Elected
