= 2004 Carinthian state election =

← 1999	7 March 2004	2009 →

All 36 seats in the Landtag of Carinthia 19 seats needed for a majority
- Turnout: 334,431 (78.6%) ▼1.9%
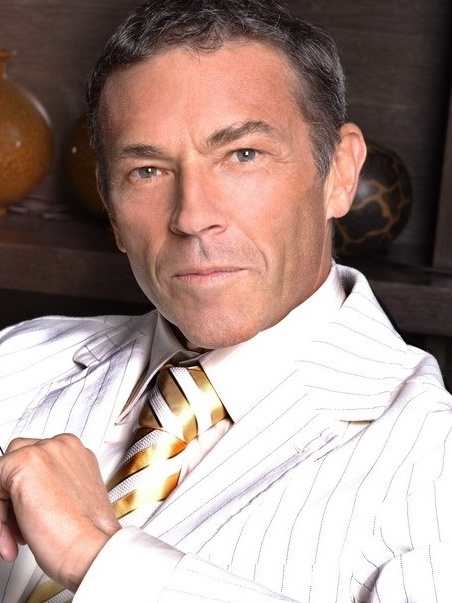

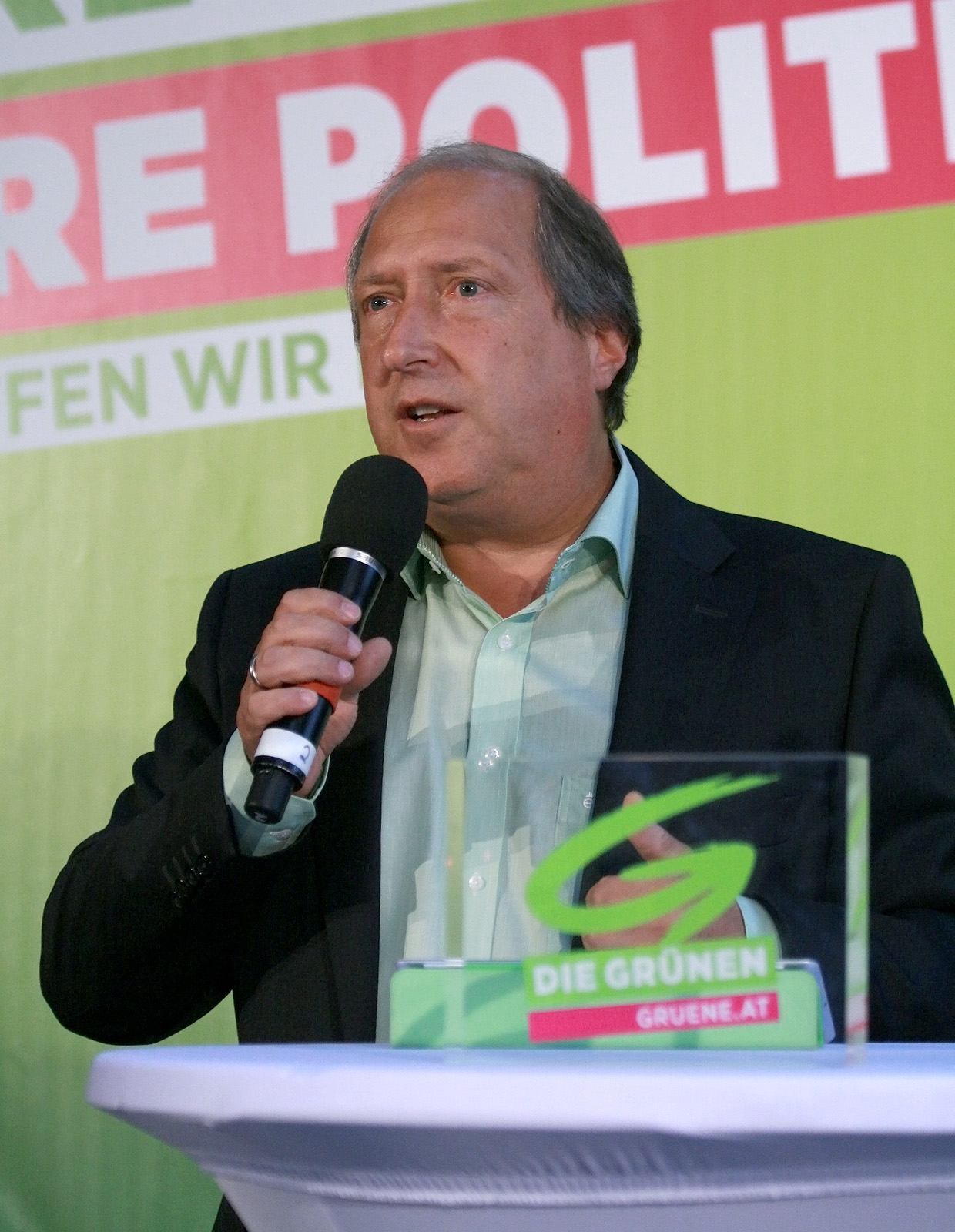
	First party	Second party
Leader	Jörg Haider	Peter Ambrozy
Party	FPÖ	SPÖ
Last election	16 seats, 42.1%	12 seats, 32.9%
Seats won	16	14
Seat change	0	▲2
Popular vote	139,479	126,325
Percentage	42.4%	38.4%
Swing	▲0.4%	▲5.6%
	Third party	Fourth party
Leader	Elisabeth Scheucher	Rolf Holub
Party	ÖVP	Greens
Last election	8 seats, 20.7%	0 seats, 3.9% (Note: As part of the joint list Democracy 99.)
Seats won	4	2
Seat change	▼4	▲2
Popular vote	38,256	22,053
Percentage	11.6%	6.7%
Swing	▼9.1%	▲2.8%
Governor before election
Jörg Haider
FPÖ
Elected Governor
Jörg Haider
FPÖ

The 2004 Carinthian state election was held on 7 March 2004 to elect the members of the Landtag of Carinthia, Austria.

The election was a victory for the first-term Freedom Party of Austria (FPÖ) government under Jörg Haider, which repeated its strong performance from the previous election. This came despite difficulties on the federal level and recent defeats in other state elections, as well as a strong challenge from the Social Democratic Party of Austria (SPÖ). The Austrian People's Party (ÖVP) lost almost half its voteshare, while The Greens won seats for the first time.

== Background ==
Prior to amendments made in 2017, the Carinthian constitution mandated that cabinet positions in the state government (state councillors, German: Landesräten) be allocated between parties proportionally in accordance with the share of votes won by each; this is known as Proporz. As such, the government was a perpetual coalition of all parties that qualified for at least one state councillor.

In the 1999 state election, the FPÖ became the largest party in a state legislature for the first time in history, winning 42% of votes cast. FPÖ leader Jörg Haider became Governor.

== Electoral system ==
The 36 seats of the Landtag of Carinthia are elected via open list proportional representation in a two-step process. The seats are distributed between four multi-member constituencies. For parties to receive any representation in the Landtag, they must either win at least one seat in a constituency directly, or clear a 5 percent state-wide electoral threshold. Seats are distributed in constituencies according to the Hare quota, with any remaining seats allocated using the D'Hondt method at the state level, to ensure overall proportionality between a party's vote share and its share of seats.

== Contesting parties ==
The table below lists parties represented in the previous Landtag.

Name		Ideology	Leader	1999 result		
Name		Ideology	Leader	Votes (%)	Seats	Councillors
FPÖ	Freedom Party of Austria; Freiheitliche Partei Österreichs	Right-wing populism Euroscepticism	Jörg Haider	42.1%	16 / 36	3 / 7
SPÖ	Social Democratic Party of Austria; Sozialdemokratische Partei Österreichs	Social democracy	Peter Ambrozy	32.9%	12 / 36	3 / 7
ÖVP	Austrian People's Party; Österreichische Volkspartei	Christian democracy	Elisabeth Scheucher	20.7%	8 / 36	1 / 7

In addition to the parties already represented in the Landtag, three parties collected enough signatures to be placed on the ballot.

- The Greens – The Green Alternative (GRÜNE)
- Communist Party of Austria (KPÖ)
- SAU Party (SAU)

== Results ==
Party	Votes	%	+/−	Seats	+/−	Coun.	+/−
Freedom Party of Austria (FPÖ)	139,479	42.43	+0.37	16	±0	3	±0
Social Democratic Party of Austria (SPÖ)	126,325	38.43	+5.57	14	+2	3	±0
Austrian People's Party (ÖVP)	38,256	11.64	–9.10	4	–4	1	±0
The Greens – The Green Alternative (GRÜNE)	22,053	6.71	+2.78	2	+2	0	±0
Communist Party of Austria (KPÖ)	1,951	0.59	+0.18	0	±0	0	±0
SAU Party (SAU)	635	0.19	New	0	New	0	New
Invalid/blank votes	5,732	–	–	–	–	–	–
Total	334,431	100	–	36	0	7	0
Registered voters/turnout	425,304	78.63	–1.87	–	–	–	–
Source: Carinthian Government

Popular vote
FPÖ	42.42%
SPÖ	38.43%
ÖVP	11.64%
GRÜNE	6.71%
Other	0.78%

Landtag seats
FPÖ	44.44%
SPÖ	38.89%
ÖVP	11.11%
GRÜNE	5.56%

=== Results by constituency ===
Constituency	FPÖ		SPÖ		ÖVP		Grüne		Others	Total seats	Turnout
Constituency	%	S	%	S	%	S	%	S	%	Total seats	Turnout
Klagenfurt	41.7	4	35.8	3	10.7	1	11.1	1	0.7	9	76.9
Carinthia East	42.6	4	39.4	4	12.6	1	4.8		0.6	9	80.2
Villach	40.0	3	43.9	3	8.3		6.2		1.5	6	77.9
Carinthia West	45.1	4	35.1	3	14.5	1	4.8		0.5	8	79.4
Remaining seats		1		1		1		1		4	
Total	42.4	16	38.4	14	11.6	4	6.7	2	0.8	36	78.6
Source: Carinthian Government
