= 2018 Carinthian state election =

← 2013	5 March 2018	2023 →

All 36 seats in the Landtag of Carinthia 19 seats needed for a majority
- Turnout: 297,921 (68.6%) ▼6.5%
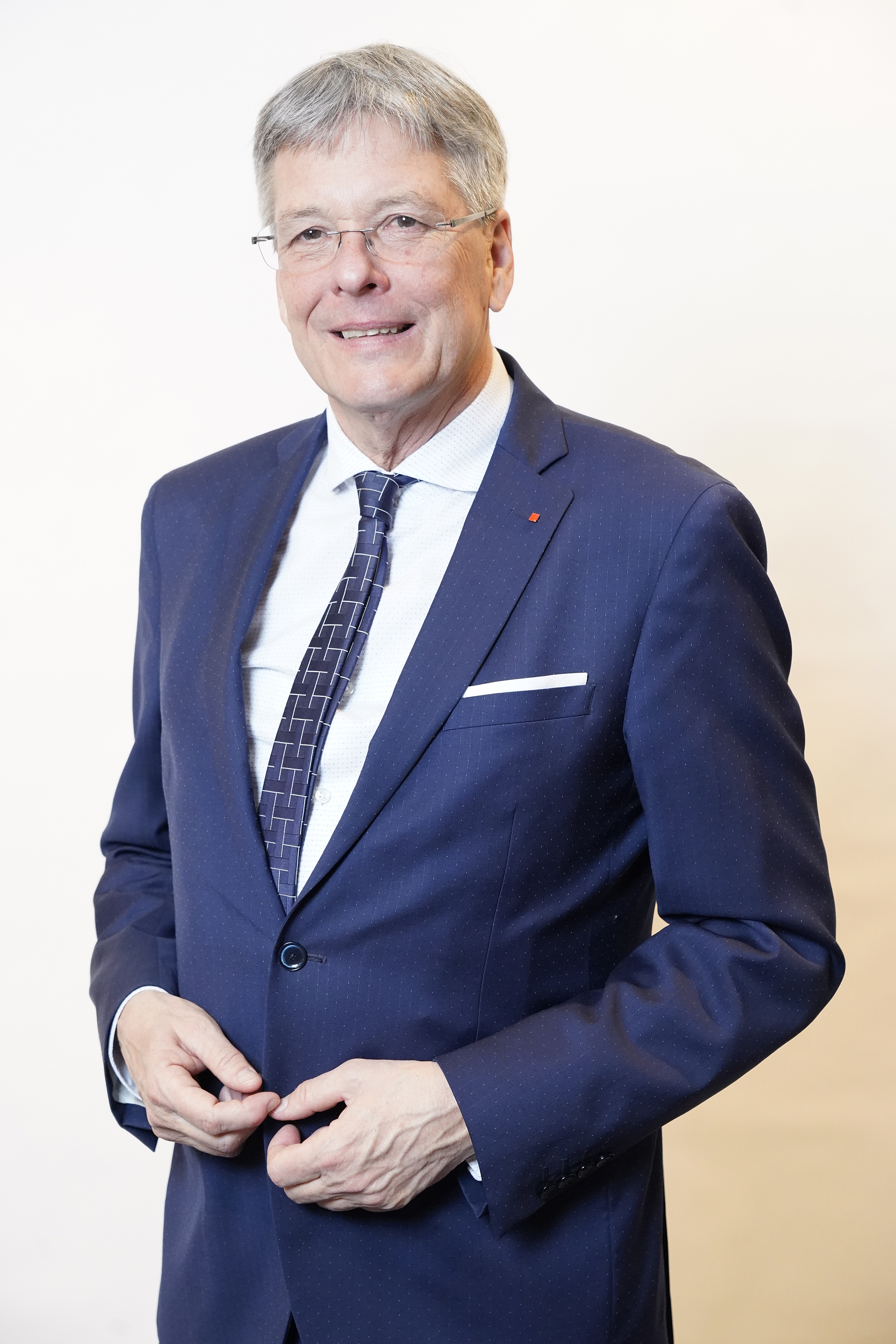

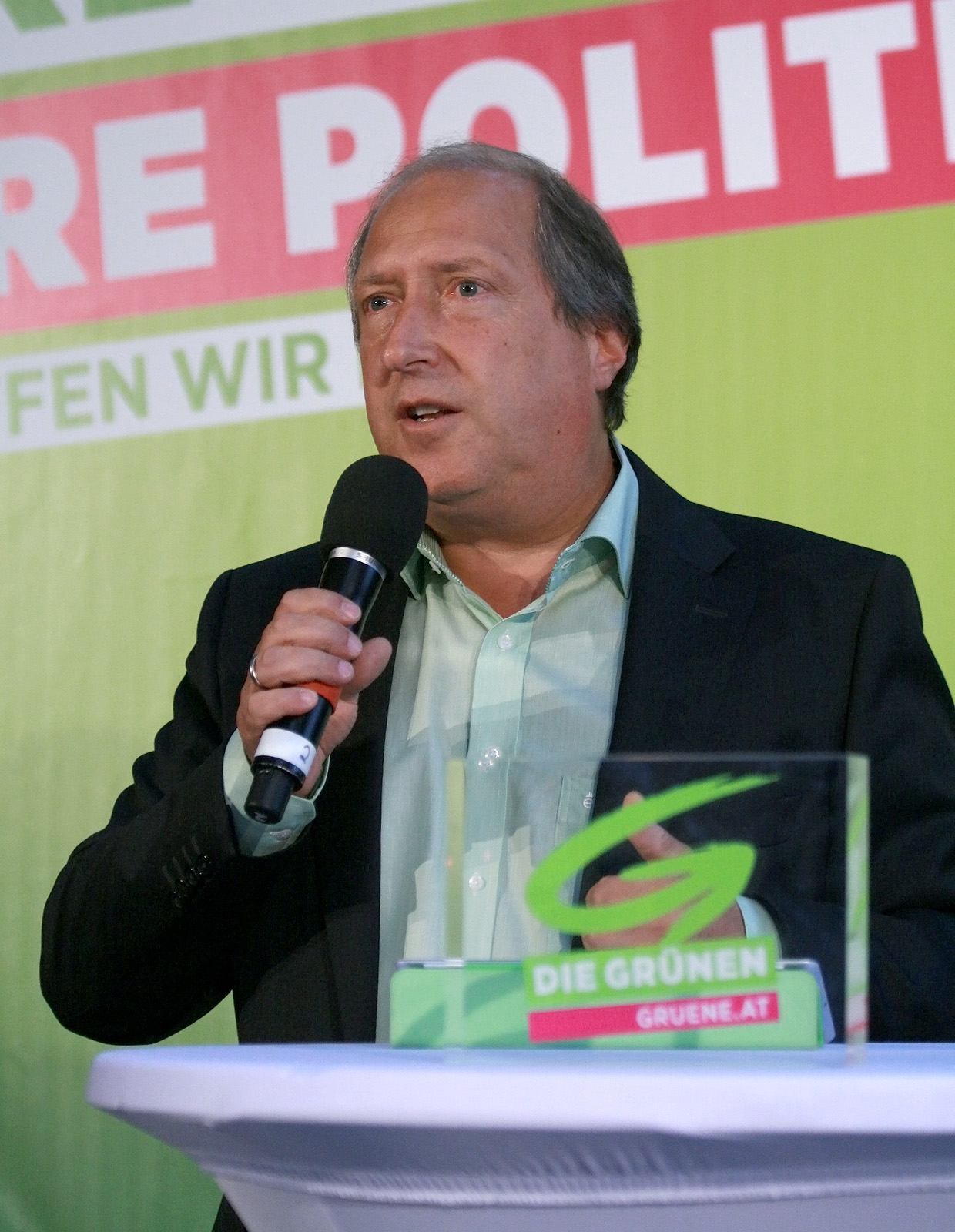
	First party	Second party	Third party
Leader	Peter Kaiser	Gernot Darmann	Christian Benger
Party	SPÖ	FPÖ	ÖVP
Last election	14 seats, 37.1%	6 seats, 16.8%	5 seats, 14.4%
Seats won	18	9	6
Seat change	▲4	▲3	▲1
Popular vote	140,994	67,538	45,438
Percentage	47.9%	23.0%	15.5%
Swing	▲10.8%	▲6.2%	▲1.1%
	Fourth party	Fifth party
Leader	Gerhard Köfer	Rolf Holub
Party	TK	Greens
Last election	4 seats, 11.1%	5 seats, 12.1%
Seats won	3	0
Seat change	▼1	▼5
Popular vote	16,667	9,188
Percentage	5.7%	3.1%
Swing	▼5.5%	▼9.0%
- Results by municipality. The lighter shade indicates a plurality; the darker shade indicates a majority.
Governor before election
Peter Kaiser
SPÖ
Elected Governor
Peter Kaiser
SPÖ

The 2018 Carinthian state election was held on 5 March 2018 to elect the members of the Landtag of Carinthia.

The centre-left Social Democratic Party of Austria (SPÖ) was the clear winner, taking 47.9% of votes, an eleven percentage point increase from 2013. The Freedom Party of Austria (FPÖ) gained six points, and the Austrian People's Party (ÖVP) gained one. This was enabled by a collapse in support for other parties: Team Carinthia, which had split from defunct Team Stronach, lost half its voteshare; The Greens tumbled from 12% to 3% and lost their representation; and the Alliance for the Future of Austria (BZÖ) collapsed from 6.4% to just 0.4%.

The SPÖ fell one seat short of an absolute majority, and held exploratory talks with the three other parties in the Landtag. They ultimately formed a coalition government with the ÖVP.

== Background ==
Prior to amendments made in 2017, the Carinthian constitution mandated that cabinet positions in the state government be allocated between parties proportionally in accordance with the share of votes won by each; this is known as Proporz. As such, the government was a perpetual coalition of all parties that qualified for at least one cabinet position. In June 2017, the SPÖ, ÖVP, and Greens (all members of the government) as well as Team Carinthia voted to amend the constitution to remove this requirement. As such, the 2018 election was the first in post-war Carinthian history in which conventional coalition formation could take place.

In the 2013 election, the Freedom Party in Carinthia suffered the largest defeat of any party in Austrian history, falling from 45% to just 17%. Their collapse led to a highly fractious result, with five parties winning at least one state councillor. However, the SPÖ emerged as a clear victor with 37% of the vote. The FPK, having previously been the dominant party in the state, won only one state councillor. Shortly after the election, they voted to give up their independence and merge into the federal Freedom Party. The SPÖ subsequently formed a governing agreement with the ÖVP and Greens.

== Electoral system ==
The 36 seats of the Landtag of Carinthia are elected via open list proportional representation in a two-step process. The seats are distributed between four multi-member constituencies. For parties to receive any representation in the Landtag, they must either win at least one seat in a constituency directly, or clear a 5 percent state-wide electoral threshold. Seats are distributed in constituencies according to the Hare quota, with any remaining seats allocated using the D'Hondt method at the state level, to ensure overall proportionality between a party's vote share and its share of seats.

== Contesting parties ==
The table below lists parties represented in the previous Landtag.

Name		Ideology	Leader	2013 result	
Name		Ideology	Leader	Votes (%)	Seats
SPÖ	Social Democratic Party of Austria; Sozialdemokratische Partei Österreichs	Social democracy	Peter Kaiser	37.1%	14 / 36
FPÖ	Freedom Party of Austria; Freiheitliche Partei Österreichs	Right-wing populism Euroscepticism	Gernot Darmann	16.8%	6 / 36
ÖVP	Austrian People's Party; Österreichische Volkspartei	Christian democracy	Wolfgang Waldner	14.4%	5 / 36
GRÜNE	The Greens – The Green Alternative; Die Grünen – Die Grüne Alternative	Green politics	Rolf Holub	12.1%	5 / 36
TK	Team Carinthia; Team Kärnten	Populism	Gerhard Köfer	11.1%	4 / 36
BZÖ	Alliance for the Future of Austria; Bündnis Zukunft Österreich	National conservatism	Helmut Nikel	6.4%	2 / 36

In addition to the parties already represented in the Landtag, four parties collected enough signatures to be placed on the ballot.

- NEOS – The New Austria and Liberal Forum (NEOS)
- Communist Party of Austria (KPÖ) – on the ballot only in Klagenfurt, Carinthia East, and Villach
- Responsibility Earth (ERDE)
- FAIR (FAIR)

== Opinion polling ==
Polling firm	Fieldwork date	Sample size	SPÖ	FPÖ	ÖVP	Grüne	TK	BZÖ	NEOS	Others	Lead
2018 state election	5 March 2018	–	47.9	22.9	15.4	3.1	5.7	0.4	2.1	2.7	25.0
OGM	14–20 Feb 2018	786	44	24	18	2–3	5	–	4–5	1–2	20
M+R	Autumn 2017	500	42–44	26–28	16–18	3–4	5–6	–	2–3	2	14–18
TrendCom	February 2017	1,100	39	28	13	12	4	0	3	–	11
IFAP	12 Aug 2014	?	43	16	17	13	4	2	4	–	26
Humaninstitut	26 Mar 2014	?	38	16	12	14	10	3	7	–	22
IMAS	28 Feb 2014	?	36	18	10	15	8	1.5	10	1.5	18
2013 state election	3 March 2013	–	37.1	16.8	14.4	12.1	11.2	6.4	–	1.9	20.3

== Results ==
Party	Votes	%	+/−	Seats	+/−
Social Democratic Party of Austria (SPÖ)	140,994	47.94	+10.81	18	+4
Freedom Party of Austria (FPÖ)	67,538	22.96	+6.11	9	+3
Austrian People's Party (ÖVP)	45,438	15.45	+1.05	6	+1
Team Carinthia (TK)	16,667	5.67	–5.51	3	–1
The Greens – The Green Alternative (GRÜNE)	9,188	3.12	–8.98	0	–5
NEOS – The New Austria (NEOS)	6,307	2.14	New	0	New
Responsibility EARTH (ERDE)	5,441	1.85	New	0	New
Alliance for the Future of Austria (BZÖ)	1,075	0.37	–6.03	0	–2
Communist Party of Austria (KPÖ)	822	0.28	+0.28	0	±0
FAIR (FAIR)	622	0.21	New	0	New
Invalid/blank votes	3,826	–	–	–	–
Total	297,918	100	–	36	0
Registered voters/turnout	434,121	68.63	–6.52	–	–
Source: Carinthian Government

Popular vote
SPÖ	47.94%
FPÖ	22.96%
ÖVP	15.45%
TK	5.67%
GRÜNE	3.12%
NEOS	2.14%
Other	2.72%

Landtag seats
SPÖ	50.00%
FPÖ	25.00%
ÖVP	16.67%
TK	8.33%

=== Results by constituency ===
Constituency	SPÖ		FPÖ		ÖVP		TK		Grüne		NEOS		Others	Total seats	Turnout
Constituency	%	S	%	S	%	S	%	S	%	S	%	S	%	Total seats	Turnout
Klagenfurt	51.7	5	19.9	1	13.3	1	4.9		5.0		2.6		2.7	7	67.4
Carinthia East	46.4	4	25.8	2	17.0	1	4.8		2.2		1.9		1.9	7	69.3
Villach	51.2	4	21.6	1	12.4		5.4		2.9		2.1		4.5	5	67.9
Carinthia West	42.3	3	24.5	1	19.0	1	7.9		2.3		1.9		2.1	5	70.0
Remaining seats		2		4		3		3		0		0		12	
Total	47.9	18	22.9	9	15.4	6	5.7	3	3.1	0	2.1	0	2.7	36	68.6
Source: Carinthian Government

== Aftermath ==
After the election, the SPÖ began exploratory talks with the three other parties in the Landtag. By the beginning of April, a coalition agreement had been reached with the ÖVP. However, after ÖVP leader Christian Benger unexpectedly resigned a few days later, the SPÖ led by Kaiser demanded the coalition be renegotiated, fearing the new ÖVP leadership may renege on promises made by their predecessors. On 9 April, the coalition was finalised and presented.
