= Team Carinthia =

Political party in Austria

Team Carinthia Team Kärnten
- Abbreviation: TK
- Chairman: Gerhard Köfer
- Deputy Chairman: Siegfried Huber
- Founded: 27 September 2012 (Team Stronach Carinthia); 1 October 2016 (Team Carinthia)
- Headquarters: Lidmanskygasse 10, A-9020 Klagenfurt
- Ideology: Carinthian regionalism; Populism
- National affiliation: Team Stronach (2012–2016)
- European affiliation: European Alliance for Freedom and Democracy (2020–2023)
- Colours: Flag of Carinthia: Yellow; Red; White
- National Council: 0 / 183
- Federal Council: 0 / 60
- European Parliament: 0 / 20
- Landtag Seats: 5 / 440

Website
- team-kaernten.at

Team Carinthia (German: Team Kärnten, TK), formerly Team Stronach Carinthia, is a political party in the Austrian state of Carinthia. It emerged from the Carinthian regional organization of the now defunct Team Stronach. In the media, it is attested to have a populist orientation. In the 2018 Carinthian state election, Team Carinthia reached the Carinthian Landtag with 5.80% of the votes.

== History ==
In the 2013 Carinthian state election, the party achieved 11.18% of the votes cast and entered the Carinthian Landtag with four seats. The Team Stronach Carinthia, together with the Team Stronach Lower Austria, which also received 9.84% of the votes cast in the 2013 Lower Austrian state election, was not just one of the first two regional organizations of the Team Stronach to participate in elections but also one of the two first regional organizations of the party to be elected to an Austrian state parliament.

After Frank Stronach had deposed Gerhard Köfer as Carinthian state party chairman and the entire state party executive on October 2, 2013 and appointed the state parliament member Siegfried Schalli as the new state party chairman, tensions arose within the party. The conflict over Frank Stronach's influence on the national organization, which was fought between Köfer, Schalli and their respective supporters, was finally resolved after several crisis meetings. On October 14, 2013 Andrea Krainer was elected interim state party leader.

At the end of October 2013, Schalli surprisingly left the party and switched to the FPÖ. The Stronach Carinthia team lost its club status in the state parliament and was only an interest group. Martin Rutter was expelled from the party by party chairman Gerhard Köfer at the end of September 2017. When Isabella Theuermann moved to the FPÖ in December 2017, only Hartmut Prasch remained in the state parliament and the list lost its status as an interest group.

In December 2013, Gerhard Klocker was elected as the new interim state party chairman. In April 2014, Klocker finally became state party chairman.

Since October 2016, after the repayment of a loan to Frank Stronach, the party appeared under the name “Free Team Carinthia – List Gerhard Köfer”. For legal reasons, the party continued to use the name Stronach until the end of the legislative period. In November there was an amendment to the statutes, which dissolved the party from the Stronach team. State party chairman of the now independent party was Gerhard Köfer. For the 2018 state election, the party ran as Team Carinthia and achieved 5.7%. The party was thus represented with three members in the state parliament.

In the 2021 municipal elections, the Team Carinthia competed in seven municipalities, in four of which they also made candidates for mayor's office. The arrival in the district capital Spittal an der Drau, the state capital Klagenfurt and the municipality Keutschach am See, where with the party chairman Köfer and Christian Scheider and Gerhard Oleschko, who left the FPÖ, three former mayors for the office of city council, were of particular importance. or the head of the community were running. The mayoral candidates were able to prevail in all four municipalities (in addition to those mentioned in Sankt Georgen im Lavanttal).

In the 2023 state election, the party received 10.1% of the vote and gained 2 seats, hence receiving a total of 5 seats in the state parliament.

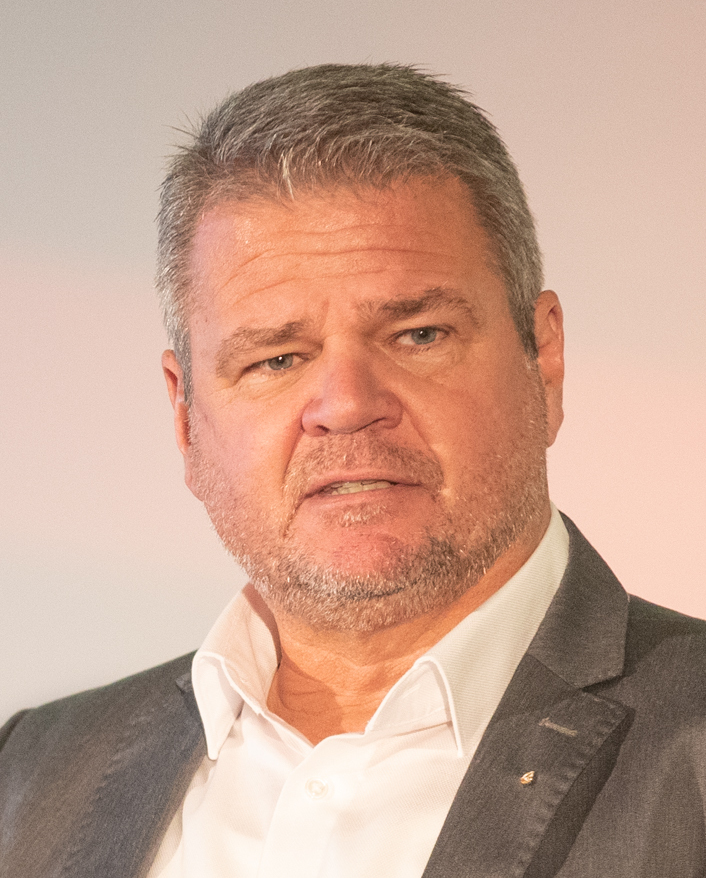
Gerhard Köfer - Chairman of Team Carinthia
