= Carinthia East (National Council electoral district) =

Parliamentary electoral district in Austria

- Kärnten Ost; Koroška vzhod
- Electoral District for the National Council
- Location of Carinthia East within Austria
- District: List: St. Veit an der Glan; Völkermarkt; Wolfsberg
- State: Carinthia
- Population: 148,243 (2024)
- Electorate: 120,644 (2019)
- Area: 3,375 km^{2} (2023)

Current Electoral District
- Created: 1994
- Seats: List: 3 (2024–present); 4 (1994–2024)
- Members: Johann Weber (ÖVP)

Carinthia East (German: Kärnten Ost; Slovene: Koroška vzhod), also known as Electoral District 2D (German: Wahlkreis 2D), is one of the 39 multi-member regional electoral districts of the National Council, the lower house of the Austrian Parliament, the national legislature of Austria. The electoral district was created in 1992 when electoral regulations were amended to add regional electoral districts to the existing state-wide electoral districts and came into being at the following legislative election in 1994. It consists of the districts of St. Veit an der Glan, Völkermarkt and Wolfsberg in the state of Carinthia. The electoral district currently elects three of the 183 members of the National Council using the open party-list proportional representation electoral system. At the 2019 legislative election the constituency had 120,644 registered electors.

== History ==
Carinthia East was one 43 regional electoral districts (regionalwahlkreise) established by the "National Council Electoral Regulations 1992" (Nationalrats-Wahlordnung 1992) passed by the National Council in 1992. It consisted of the districts of St. Veit an der Glan, Völkermarkt and Wolfsberg in the state of Carinthia. The district was initially allocated four seats in May 1993. Electoral regulations require the allocation of seats amongst the electoral districts to be recalculated following each national census and in June 2023 the number of seats allocated to Carinthia East was reduced to three based on the population as at the 2021 national census.

== Electoral system ==
Carinthia East currently elects three of the 183 members of the National Council using the open party-list proportional representation electoral system. The allocation of seats is carried out in three stages. In the first stage, seats are allocated to parties (lists) at the regional level using a state-wide Hare quota (wahlzahl) (valid votes in the state divided by the number of seats in the state). In the second stage, seats are allocated to parties at the state/provincial level using the state-wide Hare quota (any seats won by the party at the regional stage are subtracted from the party's state seats). In the third and final stage, seats are allocated to parties at the federal/national level using the D'Hondt method (any seats won by the party at the regional and state stages are subtracted from the party's federal seats). Only parties that reach the 4% national threshold, or have won a seat at the regional stage, compete for seats at the state and federal stages.

Electors may cast one preferential vote for individual candidates at the regional, state and federal levels. Split-ticket voting (panachage), or voting for more than one candidate at each level, is not permitted and will result in the ballot paper being invalidated. At the regional level, candidates must receive preferential votes amounting to at least 14% of the valid votes cast for their party to over-ride the order of the party list (10% and 7% respectively for the state and federal levels). Prior to April 2013 electors could not cast preferential votes at the federal level and the thresholds candidates needed to over-ride the party list order were higher at the regional level (half the Hare quota or 1/6 of the party votes) and state level (Hare quota).

== Election results ==
=== Summary ===
| Election | Communists KPÖ+ / KPÖ | | | Social Democrats SPÖ | | | Greens GRÜNE | | | NEOS NEOS / LiF | | | People's ÖVP | | | Alliance for the Future BZÖ | | | Freedom FPÖ | | |
| Election | Votes | % | Seats | Votes | % | Seats | Votes | % | Seats | Votes | % | Seats | Votes | % | Seats | Votes | % | Seats | Votes | % | Seats |
|---|---|---|---|---|---|---|---|---|---|---|---|---|---|---|---|---|---|---|---|---|---|
| 2019 | 371 | 0.44% | 0 | 23,522 | 27.58% | 0 | 6,138 | 7.20% | 0 | 4,461 | 5.23% | 0 | 30,898 | 36.23% | 1 | 215 | 0.25% | 0 | 18,266 | 21.42% | 0 |
| 2017 | 429 | 0.45% | 0 | 27,659 | 29.20% | 1 | 1,677 | 1.77% | 0 | 3,361 | 3.55% | 0 | 25,403 | 26.82% | 0 | | | | 32,634 | 34.46% | 1 |
| 2013 | 517 | 0.58% | 0 | 30,252 | 34.23% | 1 | 7,684 | 8.69% | 0 | 2,141 | 2.42% | 0 | 14,089 | 15.94% | 0 | 10,717 | 12.13% | 0 | 16,812 | 19.02% | 0 |
| 2008 | 416 | 0.42% | 0 | 29,032 | 29.58% | 1 | 4,764 | 4.85% | 0 | 1,532 | 1.56% | 0 | 14,348 | 14.62% | 0 | 38,818 | 39.56% | 1 | 7,526 | 7.67% | 0 |
| 2006 | 742 | 0.79% | 0 | 35,251 | 37.46% | 1 | 5,315 | 5.65% | 0 | | | | 19,670 | 20.90% | 0 | 24,471 | 26.01% | 0 | 6,585 | 7.00% | 0 |
| 2002 | 476 | 0.48% | 0 | 40,667 | 40.84% | 1 | 4,755 | 4.78% | 0 | 670 | 0.67% | 0 | 29,979 | 30.11% | 1 | | | | 23,022 | 23.12% | 0 |
| 1999 | 267 | 0.28% | 0 | 36,755 | 38.10% | 1 | 3,943 | 4.09% | 0 | 2,259 | 2.34% | 0 | 16,169 | 16.76% | 0 | | | | 36,209 | 37.54% | 1 |
| 1995 | 146 | 0.14% | 0 | 43,598 | 42.98% | 1 | 2,833 | 2.79% | 0 | 3,018 | 2.98% | 0 | 19,006 | 18.74% | 0 | | | | 32,111 | 31.66% | 1 |
| 1994 | 89 | 0.09% | 0 | 41,646 | 42.24% | 1 | 5,087 | 5.16% | 0 | 2,603 | 2.64% | 0 | 17,152 | 17.40% | 0 | | | | 31,419 | 31.86% | 1 |

=== Detailed ===
==== 2010s ====
===== 2019 =====
Results of the 2019 legislative election held on 29 September 2019:

| Party | | Votes per district | | | | Total votes | % | Seats |
| Party | | St. Veit an der Glan | Völker- markt | Wolfs- berg | Voting card | Total votes | % | Seats |
|---|---|---|---|---|---|---|---|---|
| Austrian People's Party | ÖVP | 11,008 | 8,599 | 11,206 | 85 | 30,898 | 36.23% | 1 |
| Social Democratic Party of Austria | SPÖ | 8,211 | 7,251 | 8,012 | 48 | 23,522 | 27.58% | 0 |
| Freedom Party of Austria | FPÖ | 7,333 | 4,114 | 6,785 | 34 | 18,266 | 21.42% | 0 |
| The Greens – The Green Alternative | GRÜNE | 2,103 | 2,019 | 1,950 | 66 | 6,138 | 7.20% | 0 |
| NEOS – The New Austria and Liberal Forum | NEOS | 1,741 | 1,193 | 1,491 | 36 | 4,461 | 5.23% | 0 |
| JETZT | JETZT | 418 | 368 | 347 | 9 | 1,142 | 1.34% | 0 |
| KPÖ Plus | KPÖ+ | 135 | 121 | 114 | 1 | 371 | 0.44% | 0 |
| Der Wandel | WANDL | 104 | 85 | 75 | 2 | 266 | 0.31% | 0 |
| Alliance for the Future of Austria | BZÖ | 71 | 73 | 71 | 0 | 215 | 0.25% | 0 |
| Valid Votes | | 31,124 | 23,823 | 30,051 | 281 | 85,279 | 100.00% | 1 |
| Rejected Votes | | 556 | 512 | 544 | 1 | 1,613 | 1.86% | |
| Total Polled | | 31,680 | 24,335 | 30,595 | 282 | 86,892 | 72.02% | |
| Registered Electors | | 44,371 | 33,234 | 43,039 | | 120,644 | | |
| Turnout | | 71.40% | 73.22% | 71.09% | | 72.02% | | |

The following candidates were elected:

- Party mandates - Johann Weber (ÖVP), 2,762 votes.

===== 2017 =====
Results of the 2017 legislative election held on 15 October 2017:

| Party | | Votes per district | | | | Total votes | % | Seats |
| Party | | St. Veit an der Glan | Völker- markt | Wolfs- berg | Voting card | Total votes | % | Seats |
|---|---|---|---|---|---|---|---|---|
| Freedom Party of Austria | FPÖ | 12,635 | 7,705 | 12,223 | 71 | 32,634 | 34.46% | 1 |
| Social Democratic Party of Austria | SPÖ | 9,762 | 8,252 | 9,547 | 98 | 27,659 | 29.20% | 1 |
| Austrian People's Party | ÖVP | 9,224 | 7,075 | 9,007 | 97 | 25,403 | 26.82% | 0 |
| NEOS – The New Austria and Liberal Forum | NEOS | 1,244 | 1,026 | 1,053 | 38 | 3,361 | 3.55% | 0 |
| Peter Pilz List | PILZ | 934 | 791 | 852 | 25 | 2,602 | 2.75% | 0 |
| The Greens – The Green Alternative | GRÜNE | 562 | 641 | 460 | 14 | 1,677 | 1.77% | 0 |
| My Vote Counts! | GILT | 240 | 191 | 208 | 3 | 642 | 0.68% | 0 |
| Communist Party of Austria | KPÖ | 138 | 154 | 132 | 5 | 429 | 0.45% | 0 |
| The Whites | WEIßE | 62 | 58 | 57 | 0 | 177 | 0.19% | 0 |
| Free List Austria | FLÖ | 64 | 28 | 33 | 0 | 125 | 0.13% | 0 |
| Valid Votes | | 34,865 | 25,921 | 33,572 | 351 | 94,709 | 100.00% | 2 |
| Rejected Votes | | 465 | 430 | 487 | 4 | 1,386 | 1.44% | |
| Total Polled | | 35,330 | 26,351 | 34,059 | 355 | 96,095 | 78.93% | |
| Registered Electors | | 44,826 | 33,447 | 43,473 | | 121,746 | | |
| Turnout | | 78.82% | 78.78% | 78.35% | | 78.93% | | |

The following candidates were elected:

- Personal mandates - Christian Ragger (FPÖ), 5,448 votes.
- Party mandates - Wolfgang Knes (SPÖ), 2,303 votes.

===== 2013 =====
Results of the 2013 legislative election held on 29 September 2013:

| Party | | Votes per district | | | | Total votes | % | Seats |
| Party | | St. Veit an der Glan | Völker- markt | Wolfs- berg | Voting card | Total votes | % | Seats |
|---|---|---|---|---|---|---|---|---|
| Social Democratic Party of Austria | SPÖ | 10,266 | 8,842 | 11,086 | 58 | 30,252 | 34.23% | 1 |
| Freedom Party of Austria | FPÖ | 6,165 | 3,726 | 6,895 | 26 | 16,812 | 19.02% | 0 |
| Austrian People's Party | ÖVP | 5,306 | 4,072 | 4,678 | 33 | 14,089 | 15.94% | 0 |
| Alliance for the Future of Austria | BZÖ | 5,079 | 2,409 | 3,199 | 30 | 10,717 | 12.13% | 0 |
| The Greens – The Green Alternative | GRÜNE | 2,678 | 2,644 | 2,305 | 57 | 7,684 | 8.69% | 0 |
| Team Stronach | FRANK | 1,802 | 1,652 | 2,214 | 10 | 5,678 | 6.42% | 0 |
| NEOS – The New Austria | NEOS | 825 | 625 | 665 | 26 | 2,141 | 2.42% | 0 |
| Communist Party of Austria | KPÖ | 187 | 170 | 156 | 4 | 517 | 0.58% | 0 |
| Pirate Party of Austria | PIRAT | 164 | 146 | 185 | 0 | 495 | 0.56% | 0 |
| Valid Votes | | 32,472 | 24,286 | 31,383 | 244 | 88,385 | 100.00% | 1 |
| Rejected Votes | | 804 | 647 | 680 | 2 | 2,133 | 2.36% | |
| Total Polled | | 33,276 | 24,933 | 32,063 | 246 | 90,518 | 73.06% | |
| Registered Electors | | 45,827 | 33,936 | 44,129 | | 123,892 | | |
| Turnout | | 72.61% | 73.47% | 72.66% | | 73.06% | | |

The following candidates were elected:

- Party mandates - Wolfgang Knes (SPÖ), 2,914 votes.

==== 2000s ====
===== 2008 =====
Results of the 2008 legislative election held on 28 September 2008:

| Party | | Votes per district | | | | Total votes | % | Seats |
| Party | | St. Veit an der Glan | Völker- markt | Wolfs- berg | Voting card | Total votes | % | Seats |
|---|---|---|---|---|---|---|---|---|
| Alliance for the Future of Austria | BZÖ | 13,866 | 10,128 | 14,579 | 245 | 38,818 | 39.56% | 1 |
| Social Democratic Party of Austria | SPÖ | 10,330 | 8,050 | 10,480 | 172 | 29,032 | 29.58% | 1 |
| Austrian People's Party | ÖVP | 5,284 | 4,040 | 4,832 | 192 | 14,348 | 14.62% | 0 |
| Freedom Party of Austria | FPÖ | 3,461 | 1,398 | 2,595 | 72 | 7,526 | 7.67% | 0 |
| The Greens – The Green Alternative | GRÜNE | 1,721 | 1,570 | 1,324 | 149 | 4,764 | 4.85% | 0 |
| Liberal Forum | LiF | 256 | 1,034 | 206 | 36 | 1,532 | 1.56% | 0 |
| Fritz Dinkhauser List – Citizens' Forum Tyrol | FRITZ | 265 | 187 | 202 | 11 | 665 | 0.68% | 0 |
| Independent Citizens' Initiative Save Austria | RETTÖ | 195 | 133 | 213 | 3 | 544 | 0.55% | 0 |
| Communist Party of Austria | KPÖ | 144 | 148 | 115 | 9 | 416 | 0.42% | 0 |
| The Christians | DC | 129 | 96 | 129 | 3 | 357 | 0.36% | 0 |
| List Karlheinz Klement | KHK | 21 | 40 | 21 | 1 | 83 | 0.08% | 0 |
| List Strong | STARK | 20 | 8 | 18 | 0 | 46 | 0.05% | 0 |
| Valid Votes | | 35,692 | 26,832 | 34,714 | 893 | 98,131 | 100.00% | 2 |
| Rejected Votes | | 808 | 703 | 785 | 17 | 2,313 | 2.30% | |
| Total Polled | | 36,500 | 27,535 | 35,499 | 910 | 100,444 | 79.41% | |
| Registered Electors | | 46,864 | 34,660 | 44,961 | | 126,485 | | |
| Turnout | | 77.88% | 79.44% | 78.96% | | 79.41% | | |

The following candidates were elected:

- Party mandates - Josef Bucher (BZÖ), 3,907 votes; and Peter Stauber (SPÖ), 4,758 votes.

===== 2006 =====
Results of the 2006 legislative election held on 1 October 2006:

| Party | | Votes per district | | | | Total votes | % | Seats |
| Party | | St. Veit an der Glan | Völker- markt | Wolfs- berg | Voting card | Total votes | % | Seats |
|---|---|---|---|---|---|---|---|---|
| Social Democratic Party of Austria | SPÖ | 12,414 | 9,248 | 12,744 | 845 | 35,251 | 37.46% | 1 |
| Alliance for the Future of Austria | BZÖ | 8,982 | 6,523 | 8,441 | 525 | 24,471 | 26.01% | 0 |
| Austrian People's Party | ÖVP | 7,069 | 5,199 | 6,548 | 854 | 19,670 | 20.90% | 0 |
| Freedom Party of Austria | FPÖ | 2,606 | 1,421 | 2,384 | 174 | 6,585 | 7.00% | 0 |
| The Greens – The Green Alternative | GRÜNE | 1,533 | 1,986 | 1,284 | 512 | 5,315 | 5.65% | 0 |
| Hans-Peter Martin's List | MATIN | 486 | 352 | 591 | 41 | 1,470 | 1.56% | 0 |
| Communist Party of Austria | KPÖ | 227 | 272 | 212 | 31 | 742 | 0.79% | 0 |
| EU Withdrawal – Neutral Free Austria | NFÖ | 108 | 70 | 86 | 13 | 277 | 0.29% | 0 |
| Certainly – Absolutely – Independent, Franz Radinger | SAU | 94 | 57 | 91 | 4 | 246 | 0.26% | 0 |
| List Strong | STARK | 13 | 26 | 26 | 2 | 67 | 0.07% | 0 |
| Valid Votes | | 33,532 | 25,154 | 32,407 | 3,001 | 94,094 | 100.00% | 1 |
| Rejected Votes | | 785 | 659 | 831 | 42 | 2,317 | 2.40% | |
| Total Polled | | 34,317 | 25,813 | 33,238 | 3,043 | 96,411 | 78.41% | |
| Registered Electors | | 45,577 | 33,611 | 43,774 | | 122,962 | | |
| Turnout | | 75.29% | 76.80% | 75.93% | | 78.41% | | |

The following candidates were elected:

- Personal mandates - Peter Stauber (SPÖ), 6,335 votes.

===== 2002 =====
Results of the 2002 legislative election held on 24 November 2002:

| Party | | Votes per district | | | | Total votes | % | Seats |
| Party | | St. Veit an der Glan | Völker- markt | Wolfs- berg | Voting card | Total votes | % | Seats |
|---|---|---|---|---|---|---|---|---|
| Social Democratic Party of Austria | SPÖ | 13,932 | 11,157 | 14,538 | 1,040 | 40,667 | 40.84% | 1 |
| Austrian People's Party | ÖVP | 10,408 | 7,777 | 10,405 | 1,389 | 29,979 | 30.11% | 1 |
| Freedom Party of Austria | FPÖ | 9,437 | 4,989 | 8,026 | 570 | 23,022 | 23.12% | 0 |
| The Greens – The Green Alternative | GRÜNE | 1,241 | 1,740 | 1,085 | 689 | 4,755 | 4.78% | 0 |
| Liberal Forum | LiF | 237 | 164 | 217 | 52 | 670 | 0.67% | 0 |
| Communist Party of Austria | KPÖ | 156 | 128 | 174 | 18 | 476 | 0.48% | 0 |
| Valid Votes | | 35,411 | 25,955 | 34,445 | 3,758 | 99,569 | 100.00% | 2 |
| Rejected Votes | | 697 | 719 | 760 | 42 | 2,218 | 2.18% | |
| Total Polled | | 36,108 | 26,674 | 35,205 | 3,800 | 101,787 | 84.29% | |
| Registered Electors | | 44,484 | 33,238 | 43,043 | | 120,765 | | |
| Turnout | | 81.17% | 80.25% | 81.79% | | 84.29% | | |

The following candidates were elected:

- Party mandates - Klaus Hubert Auer (ÖVP), 3,119 votes; and Christian Puswald (SPÖ), 2,750 votes.

==== 1990s ====
===== 1999 =====
Results of the 1999 legislative election held on 3 October 1999:

| Party | | Votes per district | | | | Total votes | % | Seats |
| Party | | St. Veit an der Glan | Völker- markt | Wolfs- berg | Voting card | Total votes | % | Seats |
|---|---|---|---|---|---|---|---|---|
| Social Democratic Party of Austria | SPÖ | 12,658 | 10,246 | 12,948 | 903 | 36,755 | 38.10% | 1 |
| Freedom Party of Austria | FPÖ | 13,954 | 7,683 | 13,527 | 1,045 | 36,209 | 37.54% | 1 |
| Austrian People's Party | ÖVP | 5,565 | 4,722 | 5,239 | 643 | 16,169 | 16.76% | 0 |
| The Greens – The Green Alternative | GRÜNE | 1,271 | 1,089 | 1,213 | 370 | 3,943 | 4.09% | 0 |
| Liberal Forum | LiF | 437 | 1,141 | 412 | 269 | 2,259 | 2.34% | 0 |
| The Independents | DU | 208 | 179 | 195 | 17 | 599 | 0.62% | 0 |
| Communist Party of Austria | KPÖ | 83 | 101 | 70 | 13 | 267 | 0.28% | 0 |
| No to NATO and EU – Neutral Austria Citizens' Initiative | NEIN | 105 | 59 | 93 | 7 | 264 | 0.27% | 0 |
| Valid Votes | | 34,281 | 25,220 | 33,697 | 3,267 | 96,465 | 100.00% | 2 |
| Rejected Votes | | 601 | 572 | 623 | 40 | 1,836 | 1.87% | |
| Total Polled | | 34,882 | 25,792 | 34,320 | 3,307 | 98,301 | 81.22% | |
| Registered Electors | | 44,758 | 33,203 | 43,063 | | 121,024 | | |
| Turnout | | 77.93% | 77.68% | 79.70% | | 81.22% | | |

The following candidates were elected:

- Party mandates - Anton Leikam (SPÖ), 3,825 votes; and Jakob Pistotnig (FPÖ), 2,040 votes.

Substitutions:

- Jakob Pistotnig (FPÖ) died on 24 July 2001 and was replaced by Harald Trettenbrein (FPÖ) on 13 September 2001.
- Anton Leikam (SPÖ) resigned on 7 June 2002 and was replaced by Gerhard Abraham (SPÖ) on 11 June 2002.

===== 1995 =====
Results of the 1995 legislative election held on 17 December 1995:

| Party | | Votes per district | | | | Total votes | % | Seats |
| Party | | St. Veit an der Glan | Völker- markt | Wolfs- berg | Voting card | Total votes | % | Seats |
|---|---|---|---|---|---|---|---|---|
| Social Democratic Party of Austria | SPÖ | 15,013 | 12,000 | 15,455 | 1,130 | 43,598 | 42.98% | 1 |
| Freedom Party of Austria | FPÖ | 12,656 | 6,741 | 11,703 | 1,011 | 32,111 | 31.66% | 1 |
| Austrian People's Party | ÖVP | 6,493 | 5,244 | 6,418 | 851 | 19,006 | 18.74% | 0 |
| Liberal Forum | LiF | 777 | 1,097 | 665 | 479 | 3,018 | 2.98% | 0 |
| The Greens – The Green Alternative | GRÜNE | 814 | 759 | 807 | 453 | 2,833 | 2.79% | 0 |
| No – Civic Action Group; Against the Sale of Austria | NEIN | 173 | 173 | 165 | 18 | 529 | 0.52% | 0 |
| The Best Party | DBP | 66 | 72 | 52 | 6 | 196 | 0.19% | 0 |
| Communist Party of Austria | KPÖ | 46 | 47 | 47 | 6 | 146 | 0.14% | 0 |
| Valid Votes | | 36,038 | 26,133 | 35,312 | 3,954 | 101,437 | 100.00% | 2 |
| Rejected Votes | | 848 | 777 | 862 | 54 | 2,541 | 2.44% | |
| Total Polled | | 36,886 | 26,910 | 36,174 | 4,008 | 103,978 | 86.44% | |
| Registered Electors | | 44,593 | 32,929 | 42,774 | | 120,296 | | |
| Turnout | | 82.72% | 81.72% | 84.57% | | 86.44% | | |

The following candidates were elected:

- Party mandates - Anton Leikam (SPÖ), 5,244 votes; and Kurt Ruthofer (FPÖ), 1,103 votes. (Note: FPÖ: 1st placed candidate Mathias Reichhold was elected in Carinthia.)

Substitutions:

- Kurt Ruthofer (FPÖ) resigned on 19 March 1997 and was replaced by Mathias Reichhold (FPÖ) on 20 March 1997.
- Mathias Reichhold (FPÖ) resigned on 9 June 1998 and was replaced by Heinz Anton Marolt (FPÖ) on 15 June 1998.

===== 1994 =====
Results of the 1994 legislative election held on 9 October 1994:

| Party | | Votes per district | | | | Total votes | % | Seats |
| Party | | St. Veit an der Glan | Völker- markt | Wolfs- berg | Voting card | Total votes | % | Seats |
|---|---|---|---|---|---|---|---|---|
| Social Democratic Party of Austria | SPÖ | 14,439 | 11,247 | 14,854 | 1,106 | 41,646 | 42.24% | 1 |
| Freedom Party of Austria | FPÖ | 12,506 | 6,643 | 11,283 | 987 | 31,419 | 31.86% | 1 |
| Austrian People's Party | ÖVP | 5,620 | 4,903 | 5,929 | 700 | 17,152 | 17.40% | 0 |
| The Greens – The Green Alternative | GRÜNE | 1,571 | 1,461 | 1,455 | 600 | 5,087 | 5.16% | 0 |
| Liberal Forum | LiF | 857 | 622 | 774 | 350 | 2,603 | 2.64% | 0 |
| No – Civic Action Group; Against the Sale of Austria | NEIN | 149 | 103 | 102 | 17 | 371 | 0.38% | 0 |
| The Best Party | DBP | 42 | 46 | 40 | 4 | 132 | 0.13% | 0 |
| United Greens Austria – List Adi Pinter | VGÖ | 46 | 25 | 22 | 9 | 102 | 0.10% | 0 |
| Communist Party of Austria | KPÖ | 29 | 30 | 25 | 5 | 89 | 0.09% | 0 |
| Valid Votes | | 35,259 | 25,080 | 34,484 | 3,778 | 98,601 | 100.00% | 2 |
| Rejected Votes | | 717 | 701 | 696 | 38 | 2,152 | 2.14% | |
| Total Polled | | 35,976 | 25,781 | 35,180 | 3,816 | 100,753 | 83.57% | |
| Registered Electors | | 44,743 | 32,999 | 42,825 | | 120,567 | | |
| Turnout | | 80.41% | 78.13% | 82.15% | | 83.57% | | |

The following candidates were elected:

- Party mandates - Anton Leikam (SPÖ), 4,955 votes; and Kurt Ruthofer (FPÖ), 2,575 votes.
