= Freedom Party in Carinthia =

Freedom Party in Carinthia Die Freiheitlichen in Kärnten
- Abbreviation: FPK
- Chairman: Gernot Darmann
- Parliamentary leader: Christian Leyroutz
- Founded: 1986 (as FPÖ branch); April 2005 (as BZÖ branch); December 2009 (as independent party); June 2013 (as FPÖ branch)
- Headquarters: Klagenfurt
- National affiliation: Freedom Party of Austria
- Colours: blue
- State Parliament: 9 / 36

Website
- www.fpoe-ktn.at

The Freedom Party in Carinthia (German: Die Freiheitlichen in Kärnten, FPK, alternative English translations: Carinthian Freedom Party, Freedom Party of Carinthia, The Freedomites in Carinthia, or Carinthia Freedom Party) was a political party in Austria, operating in the federal state of Carinthia.

The FPK was founded as branch of the Freedom Party of Austria (FPÖ) by Jörg Haider in 1986. It emerged as an independent party in December 2009 from the Carinthian branch of the Alliance for the Future of Austria (BZÖ), also founded by Jörg Haider in 2005 following a split in the FPÖ. Before that In the 2009 Carinthian state election the BZÖ won 44.9% of the vote, while what remained of the FPÖ got just 3.8%. Subsequently, Gerhard Dörfler, Haider's successor, was returned as state governor. The FPK, which cooperated with the FPÖ on the national level since 2010, was finally merged into the FPÖ, becoming its state section in Carinthia.

== History ==
=== Background ===
The party's origins lie with the Carinthia branch of the Freedom Party of Austria (FPÖ). Jörg Haider, chairman of that branch since 1983, was elected federal FPÖ chairman in 1986. Under a previously introduced restructuring plan, Haider transformed the Carinthian branch into The Freedom Party in Carinthia under the federal umbrella of the FPÖ. Haider made his home state of Carinthia a stronghold of the party and twice served as state governor (1989–1991 and 1999–2008).

In 2000, he also led the party into participation in the federal government of Chancellor Wolfgang Schüssel, but due to the controversies surrounding his persona, had to remove himself from federal politics, concentrating on state politics. Haider had already resigned as chairman of the state party in autumn 1998. However, even as a "common party member" he remained the most prominent figure in the party, causing the resignation of the then-party leadership in 2002.

=== Foundation and early years ===
After a series of electoral defeats, Haider in 2005 suggested re-inventing, rejuvenating the FPÖ and when this proved to be controversial, moved to found a new party, the Alliance for the Future of Austria (BZÖ). All the FPÖ government ministers and most of its deputies in the federal parliament joined the new party, continuing the coalition until the 2006 federal election.

The statute of the new party gave its Carinthian branch (running under the name The Freedomites in Carinthia — BZÖ List Jörg Haider) considerable autonomy. The party was characterised by the discrepancy between Carinthia and the other states of Austria: while the Carinthian branch of the FPÖ almost entirely sided with Haider and joined the BZÖ, the other branches stayed with the old FPÖ (though Tyrol and Vorarlberg played with the idea of switching to BZÖ). In Carinthia, the Freedomites-BZÖ under Haider could simply supplant the FPÖ as the strongest party in the state (winning subsequent election), but the BZÖ failed to overtake the FPÖ both in other state elections as well as in the 2006 federal election.

Jörg Haider, as chairman of the strongest branch within the BZÖ and as governor of Carinthia, remained the chief politician, even after giving up the federal chair in June 2006. He returned to that position in August 2008 but died in a car accident in October.

=== Haider's succession and split ===
Haider's death vacated three positions: Gerhard Dörfler immediately succeeded as governor of Carinthia, Uwe Scheuch as chairman of the state party in November 2008, and Josef Bucher as federal BZÖ chairman in April 2009.

In the 2009 state election, held in March 2009, the party won 44.9% of the vote and Dörfler was confirmed as governor.

In December 2009, the Carinthian branch of the BZÖ, led by Scheuch and Dörfler broke off from the national party organisation, citing Bucher's economic liberalism. In a press conference together with FPÖ chairman Heinz-Christian Strache, Scheuch announced that his party would henceforth put their support behind the FPÖ rather than the BZÖ. Scheuch emphasised that the Freedom Party of Carinthia (FPK) would remain a distinct party, citing the relationship of the German CDU and the Bavarian CSU as an example.

The BZÖ leadership disputed the legality of the split and, at the FPK party convention on 16 January 2010, tried to force a referendum on the party's future alignment. However, Scheuch was reelected by 90% of the delegates and the re-alignment with the FPÖ received unanimous support. On 30 January, the BZÖ founded their own Carinthian branch, with federal chairman Bucher also functioning as state chairman.

=== 2013 state election and dissolution ===
In the 2013 state election, held in March 2013, the party saw its share of votes more than halved at 16.9%, the largest loss of votes in post-World War II Austria, while the BZÖ got 6.4%. Gerhard Dörfler was thus replaced as governor by Peter Kaiser, local leader of the Social Democratic Party of Austria.

In June 2013 97.3% of party members decided to merge the FPK into the FPÖ, thus becoming its state section in Carinthia.

== List of chairmen ==
- Jörg Haider (2005–2008)
- Uwe Scheuch (2008–2012)
- Kurt Scheuch (2012–2013)
- Christian Ragger (2013)
