= List of political parties in Austria =

This article lists political parties in Austria. Austria has a multi-party system. Of the over 1,100 registered political parties, only few are known to the larger public. Since the 1980s, four parties have consistently received enough votes to get seats in the national parliament.

== Political parties ==
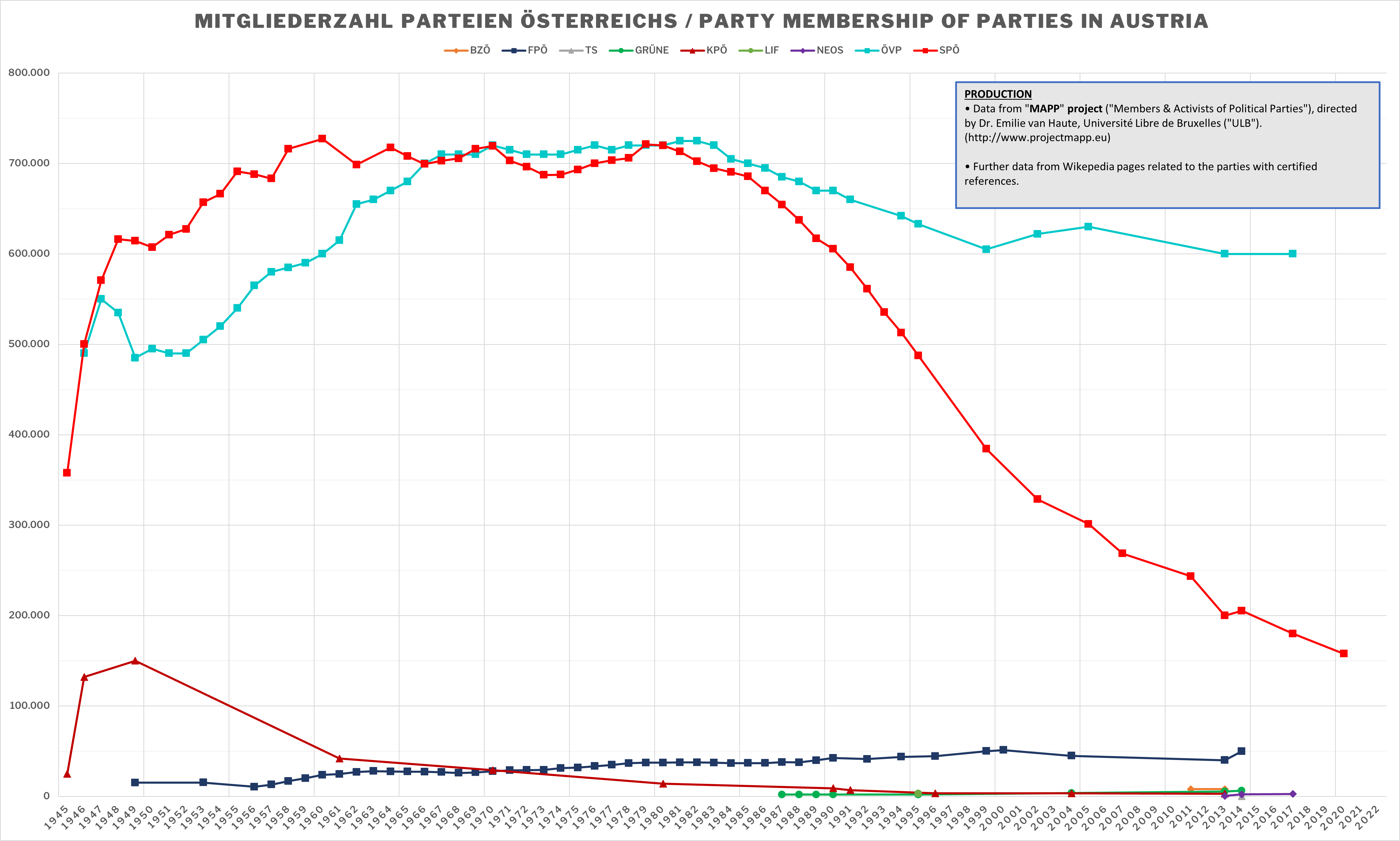
Party membership of parties in Austria, since 1945. Since 1986, the social democratic party has started a quick decline in membership.

=== Parties represented in Parliament or the European Parliament ===
There are five parties represented in the National Council. All of the parties in the National Council are also represented in the Federal Council and all of the five parties in the National Council are represented in the European Parliament.

Logo	Name	Abbr.	Ideology	Position	European party	EP group	Leader	National Council	Federal Council	Landtag seats	MEPs
Government
	Austrian People's Party; Österreichische Volkspartei	ÖVP	Liberal conservatism; Christian democracy	Centre-right	EPP	EPP	Christian Stocker	51 / 183	26 / 60	146 / 440	5 / 20
	Social Democratic Party of Austria; Sozialdemokratische Partei Österreichs	SPÖ	Social democracy; Pro-Europeanism	Centre-left	PES	S&D	Andreas Babler	41 / 183	18 / 60	132 / 440	5 / 20
	New Austria and Liberal Forum; Das Neue Österreich und Liberales Forum	NEOS	Liberalism; Economic liberalism	Centre	ALDE	RE	Beate Meinl-Reisinger	18 / 183	1 / 60	20 / 440	2 / 20
Opposition
	Freedom Party of Austria; Freiheitliche Partei Österreichs	FPÖ	Right-wing populism; National conservatism	Far-right	Patriots.eu	PfE	Herbert Kickl	57 / 183	16 / 60	84 / 440	6 / 20
	The Greens; Die Grünen	GRÜNE	Green politics; Eco-feminism; Pro-Europeanism	Centre-left to left-wing	EGP	G/EFA	Werner Kogler	16 / 183	5 / 60	45 / 440	2 / 20

=== Parties represented in state parliaments ===
Logo	Name	Abbr.	Ideology	Position	European party	Leader	Landtag seats
	Communist Party of Austria; Kommunistische Partei Österreichs	KPÖ	Communism; Socialism; Marxism	Far-left	PEL	Günther Hopfgartner	6 / 440
	Team Carinthia; Team Kärnten	TK	Regionalism; Populism	Right-wing	EAFD	Gerhard Köfer	5 / 440
	Citizens' Forum Austria; Bürgerforum Österreich	FRITZ	Regionalism; Decentralization; Anti-corruption	Centre	EDP	Andrea Haselwanter-Schneider	3 / 440
	MFG Austria – People Freedom Fundamental Rights; MFG Österreich – Menschen Freiheit Grundrechte	MFG	Vaccine hesitancy; Anti-lockdown	Right-wing to far-right	—N/a	Michael Brunner	3 / 440

=== Parties which ran in the 2024 legislative election and/or the 2024 European elections ===
Logo	Name	Abbr.	Ideology	Position	European party	Leader
	The Beer Party; Die Bierpartei	BIER	Social liberalism; Political satire	Centre	—N/a	Dominik Wlazny
	Madeleine Petrovic List; Liste Madeleine Petrovic	LMP	Green politics; Anti-vaccination	Centre-left	—N/a	Madeleine Petrovic
	Change; Der Wandel	KEINE	Post-capitalism; Pro-Europeanism; Progressivism	Left-wing	DiEM25	Fayad Mulla
	Gaza List; Liste Gaza: Stimmen gegen den Völkermord	GAZA	Palestinianism		—N/a	Astrid Wagner
	Democratic – Neutral – Authentic; Demokratisch – Neutral – Authentisch	DNA	Anti-lockdown; Anti-vaccination	Right-wing	ECR	Maria Hubmer-Mogg

=== Minor parties ===
- Team HC Strache – Alliance for Austria (Team HC Strache – Allianz für Österreich, HC)
- Alliance for the Future of Austria (Bündnis Zukunft Österreich, BZÖ)
- Black-Yellow Alliance (Schwarz-Gelbe Allianz, SGA)
- Christian Party of Austria (Christliche Partei Österreichs, CPÖ)
- Enotna Lista (Unity List, EL)
- My Vote Counts! (Meine Stimme g!lt, G!LT)
- Neutral Free Austria Federation (Bündnis Neutrales Freies Österreich, NFÖ)
- Party of Labour of Austria (Partei der Arbeit Österreichs, PdA)
- Pirate Party of Austria (Piratenpartei Österreichs, PPÖ)
- Revolutionary Communist Party (Revolutionäre Kommunistische Partei, RKP)
- Socialist Left Party (Sozialistische LinksPartei, SLP)
- The Social Liberals (Die Sozialliberalen, SoL)
- Volt Austria (Volt Österreich)

=== Major historical parties ===
- Christian Social Party (Christlichsoziale Partei, CS, 1893–1933)
- Country League (Landbund, 1918–1934)
- Greater German People's Party (Großdeutsche Volkspartei, GDVP, 1918–1934)
- JETZT - Pilz List (JETZT – Liste Pilz, JETZT, 2017–2020)
- National Socialist German Workers' Party (Nationalsozialistische Deutsche Arbeiterpartei, NSDAP, 1919–1945)
- Fatherland Front (Vaterländische Front, VF, 1933–1938)
- Federation of Independents (Verband der Unabhängigen, VdU, 1949–1955)
- Social Democratic Workers Party of Austria (Sozialdemokratische Arbeiterpartei Österreichs, SDAPÖ, 1888–1934), predecessor of today's SPÖ
- Team Stronach (2012–2017)

=== Minor historical parties ===
- Communist Initiative (Kommunistische Initiative, 2004–2013)
- Communist League of Austria (Kommunistischer Bund Österreichs, KBÖ, 1976–1980)
- Czechoslovak Social Democratic Workers Party in the Republic of Austria (Czech: Československá sociálně demokratická strana dělnická v republice Rakoúské, 1919–1934)
- Democratic Party of Austria (Demokratische Partei Österreichs, 1945–1949)
- Free Party Salzburg (Freie Parteie Salzburg, FPS, 2015–2019)
- Freedom Party in Carinthia (Die Freiheitlichen in Kärnten, FPK, 2009–2013)
- German-National Party (Deutsche Nationalpartei, 1891–1920)
- Jewish National Party (Jüdische Nationale Partei, 1892–1930)
- League of Democratic Socialists (Bund Demokratischer Sozialisten, BDS, 1959)
- Liberal Forum (Liberales Forum, LiF, 1993–2014)
- Marxist–Leninist Party of Austria (Marxistisch-Leninistische Partei Österreichs, MLPÖ, 1967–2006)
- The Democrats (Die Demokraten, 1991–2002)
- The Independents (Die Unabhängigen, DU, 1998–1999)
- Union of Revolutionary Workers of Austria (Marxist-Leninist) (Vereinigung Revolutionärer Arbeiter Österreichs (Marxisten-Leninisten), VRAÖ, 1968–2005)

== See also ==
- History of Austria
- Liberalism in Austria
- List of political parties by country
- Politics of Austria
