= Christian Ragger =

Austrian politician (born 1973)

Member of the National Council
- Incumbent
- Assumed office 9 November 2017
- Constituency: Carinthia East

Personal details
- Born: 20 February 1973 (age 53)
- Party: Freedom Party

Christian Ragger (born 20 February 1973) is an Austrian politician of the Freedom Party. Since 2017, he has been a member of the National Council. He was a member of the Carinthian Landtag from 1999 to 2009, a member of the state government from 2009 to 2016, and the leader of the Freedom Party in Carinthia from 2013 to 2016.
