= 2013 Carinthian state election =

- 3 March 2013

All 36 seats in the Landtag of Carinthia 19 seats needed for a majority
- Turnout: 331,207 (75.1%) ▼6.6%
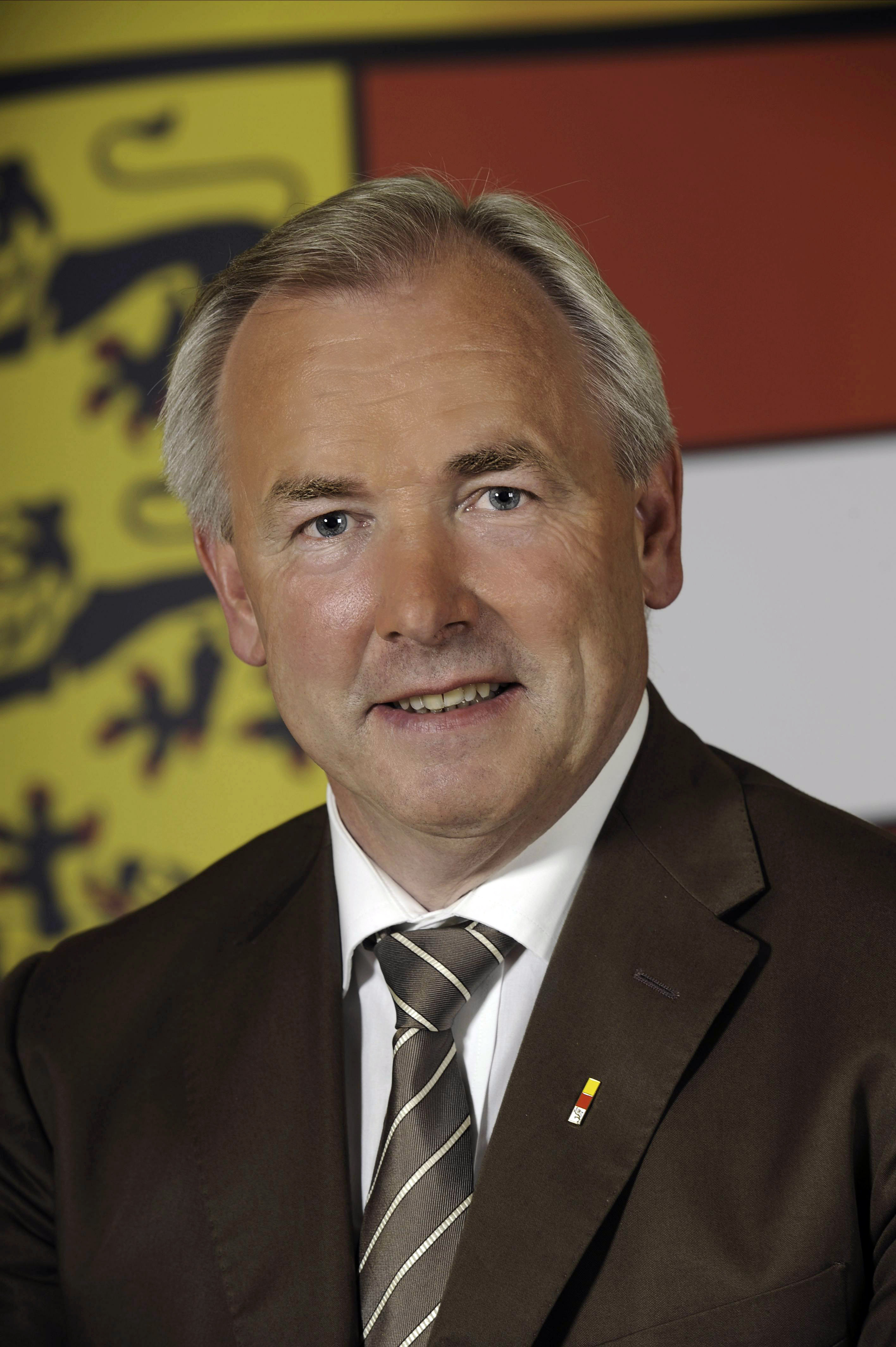

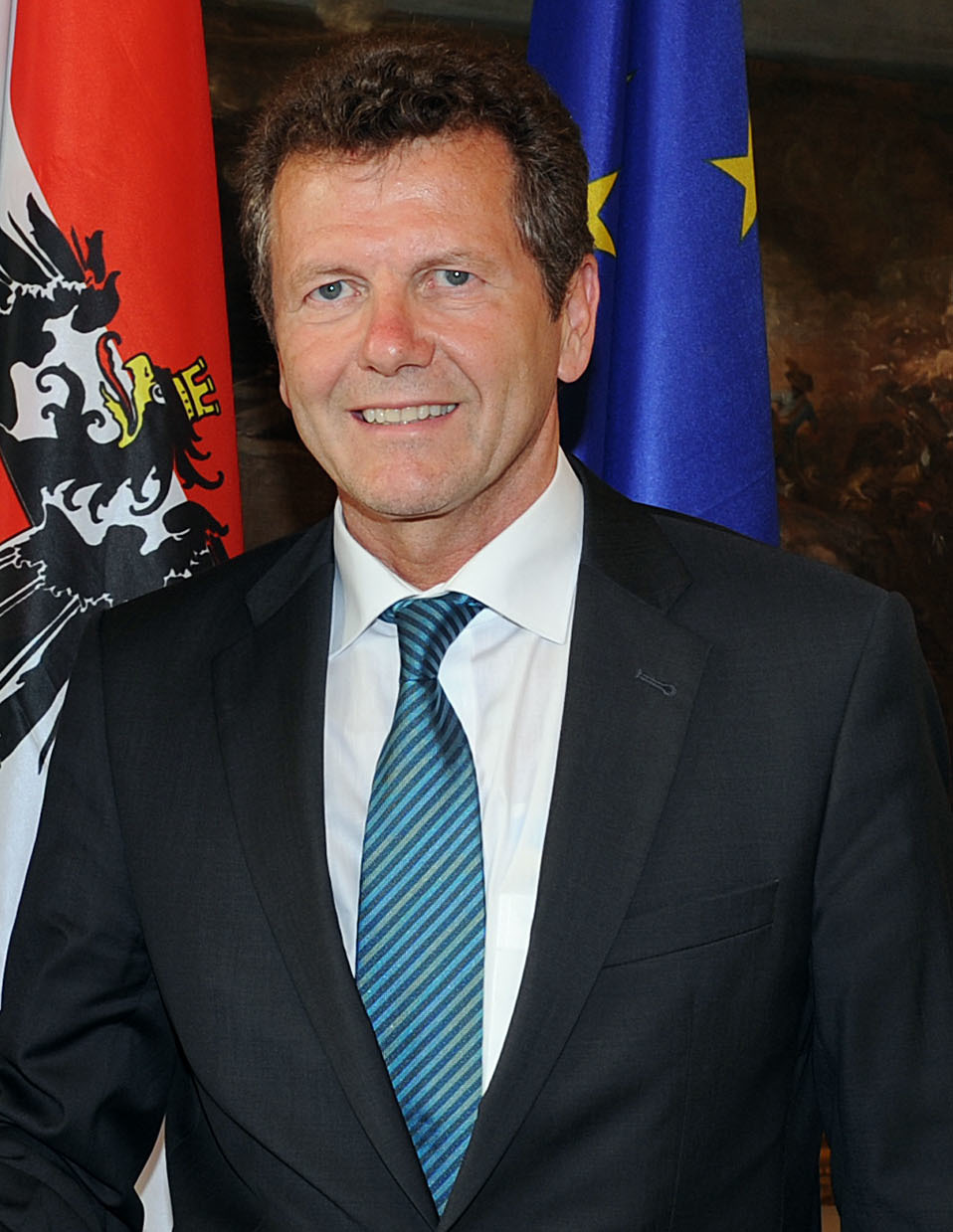

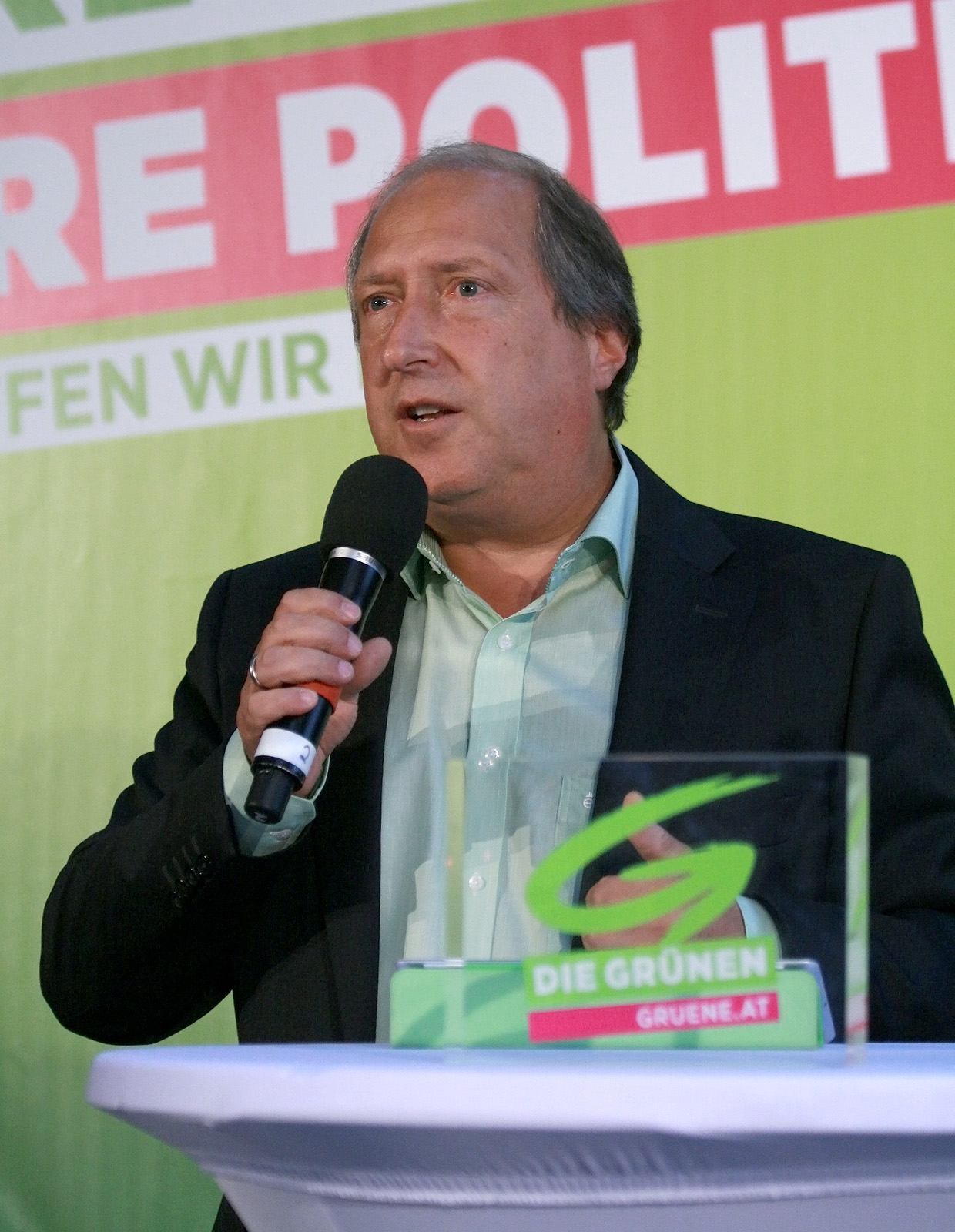

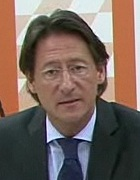
	First party	Second party	Third party
Leader	Peter Kaiser	Gerhard Dörfler	Wolfgang Waldner
Party	SPÖ	FPK	ÖVP
Last election	11 seats, 28.8%	17 seats, 44.9%	6 seats, 16.8%
Seats won	14	6	5
Seat change	▲3	▼11	▼1
Popular vote	120,396	54,634	46,696
Percentage	37.1%	16.8%	14.4%
Swing	▲8.3%	▼28.0%	▼2.4%
	Fourth party	Fifth party	Sixth party
Leader	Rolf Holub	Gerhard Köfer	Josef Bucher
Party	Greens	Stronach	BZÖ
Last election	2 seats, 5.1%	Did not exist	Did not contest
Seats won	5	4	2
Seat change	▲3	▲4	▲2
Popular vote	39,241	36,256	20,745
Percentage	12.1%	11.2%	6.4%
Swing	▲6.9%	New party	▲6.4%
Governor before election
Gerhard Dörfler
FPK
Elected Governor
Peter Kaiser
SPÖ

The 2013 Carinthian state election was held on 3 March 2013 to elect the members of the Landtag of Carinthia.

The election saw a massive shift in Carinthian politics, which had been dominated by the Freedom Party in Carinthia (FPK) and Governor Jörg Haider since the 1990s. After Haider's death in 2008, he was succeeded by Gerhard Dörfler. After winning the 2009 election, Dörfler's government suffered a string of scandals and the FPK's popularity plummeted. Ultimately, they suffered a catastrophic loss of 28 percentage points, the worst ever suffered by a party in post-war Austria. They finished on 16.8%, a distant second place behind the Social Democratic Party of Austria (SPÖ), which won 37.1%. The Austrian People's Party (ÖVP) retained third place, but declined to 14.4%. Apart from the SPÖ, other beneficiaries of the FPK's collapse were The Greens, Team Stronach, and Alliance for the Future of Austria (BZÖ), who each made significant gains.

== Background ==
Prior to amendments made in 2017, the Carinthian constitution mandated that cabinet positions in the state government (state councillors, German: Landesräten) be allocated between parties proportionally in accordance with the share of votes won by each; this is known as Proporz. As such, the government was a perpetual coalition of all parties that qualified for at least one state councillor.

In 2005, then-Governor and former federal leader of the Freedom Party of Austria (FPÖ) Jörg Haider split from the party due to internal disputes, and founded the Alliance for the Future of Austria (BZÖ). The Freedom Party in Carinthia, then the FPÖ's state branch and led by Haider, changed its allegiance and became the Carinthian branch of the BZÖ. The large majority of its leadership and structure followed, with only a small minority defecting to the FPÖ's new Carinthian branch. Shortly after the 2008 federal election, Haider was killed in a car accident. He was succeeded by Gerhard Dörfler, who became the new Governor of Carinthia and leader of the FPK. In the 2009 Carinthian state election, Dörfler led the party to a strong victory under the name "Freedom Party in Carinthia – BZÖ List Jörg Haider". The FPÖ's new state branch won 3.8%, failing to enter the Landtag.

In December 2009, the FPK split from the BZÖ in protest of new federal leader Josef Bucher's policies, becoming an independent party operating in Carinthia. The party announced it would support the FPÖ on a national level, while the FPÖ's state branch would be dissolved. The FPÖ and FPK compared their new relationship to that of the CDU/CSU in Germany. The BZÖ subsequently founded a new Carinthian branch to compete with the FPK.

Between 2009 and 2013, Dörfler's government suffered a string of scandals involving current and former government officials, including the late Haider. In January 2010, Vice Governor Uwe Scheuch was exposed for offering Austrian citizenship to a Russian investor in exchange for investments in Carinthia and donations to the then-BZÖ. Scheuch resigned from all political positions in mid-2012 and was found guilty in December. In July 2012, a government tax consultant was caught up in a corruption scandal involving the FPK and BZÖ, which led to an early election being scheduled for March 2013.

== Electoral system ==
The 36 seats of the Landtag of Carinthia are elected via open list proportional representation in a two-step process. The seats are distributed between four multi-member constituencies. For parties to receive any representation in the Landtag, they must either win at least one seat in a constituency directly, or clear a 5 percent state-wide electoral threshold. Seats are distributed in constituencies according to the Hare quota, with any remaining seats allocated using the D'Hondt method at the state level, to ensure overall proportionality between a party's vote share and its share of seats.

== Contesting parties ==
The table below lists parties represented in the previous Landtag.

Name		Ideology	Leader	2009 result		
Name		Ideology	Leader	Votes (%)	Seats	Councillors
FPK	Freedom Party in Carinthia; Die Freiheitlichen in Kärnten	Right-wing populism Euroscepticism	Gerhard Dörfler	44.9%	17 / 36	4 / 7
SPÖ	Social Democratic Party of Austria; Sozialdemokratische Partei Österreichs	Social democracy	Peter Kaiser	28.8%	11 / 36	2 / 7
ÖVP	Austrian People's Party; Österreichische Volkspartei	Christian democracy	Wolfgang Waldner	16.8%	6 / 36	1 / 7
GRÜNE	The Greens – The Green Alternative; Die Grünen – Die Grüne Alternative	Green politics	Rolf Holub	5.1%	2 / 36	

In addition to the parties already represented in the Landtag, six parties collected enough signatures to be placed on the ballot.

- Team Stronach (TS)
- Alliance for the Future of Austria (BZÖ)
- Pirate Party of Austria (PIRAT)
- Livable Party of Austria (LPÖ)
- Social Alliance Carinthia (ASOK)
- List Strong (STARK)

== Results ==
Party	Votes	%	+/−	Seats	+/−	Coun.	+/−
Social Democratic Party of Austria (SPÖ)	120,396	37.13	+8.39	14	+3	3	+1
Freedom Party in Carinthia (FPK)	54,634	16.85	–28.04	6	–11	1	–3
Austrian People's Party (ÖVP)	46,696	14.40	–2.43	5	–1	1	±0
The Greens – The Green Alternative (GRÜNE)	39,241	12.10	+6.95	5	+3	1	+1
Team Stronach (TS)	36,256	11.18	New	4	New	1	New
Alliance for the Future of Austria (BZÖ)	20,745	6.40	New	2	New	0	New
Pirate Party of Austria (PIRAT)	3,199	0.99	New	0	New	0	New
Livable Party of Austria (LPÖ)	1,881	0.58	New	0	New	0	New
Social Alliance Carinthia (ASOK)	747	0.23	New	0	New	0	New
List Strong (STARK)	488	0.15	+0.09	0	±0	0	±0
Invalid/blank votes	6,924	–	–	–	–	–	–
Total	331,207	100	–	36	0	7	0
Registered voters/turnout	440,748	75.15	–6.63	–	–	–	–
Source: Carinthian Government

Popular vote
SPÖ	37.13%
FPK	16.85%
ÖVP	14.40%
GRÜNE	12.10%
TS	11.18%
BZÖ	6.40%
Other	1.94%

Landtag seats
SPÖ	38.89%
FPK	16.67%
ÖVP	13.89%
GRÜNE	13.89%
TS	11.11%
BZÖ	5.56%

=== Results by constituency ===
Constituency	SPÖ		FPK		ÖVP		Grüne		TS		BZÖ		Others	Total seats	Turnout
Constituency	%	S	%	S	%	S	%	S	%	S	%	S	%	Total seats	Turnout
Klagenfurt	40.0	3	12.4	1	13.3	1	16.5	1	9.8		6.1		2.0	6	74.9
Carinthia East	37.2	3	19.7	1	14.1	1	8.9		10.6	1	7.7		1.8	6	75.8
Villach	40.3	3	14.7	1	11.1		12.8	1	12.7	1	5.9		2.5	6	73.6
Carinthia West	30.7	2	20.6	1	19.1	1	10.2		12.1	1	5.7		1.7	5	76.0
Remaining seats		3		2		2		3		1		2		13	
Total	37.1	14	16.8	6	14.4	5	12.1	5	11.1	4	6.4	2	1.9	36	75.1
Source: Carinthian Government
