= 2009 Carinthian state election =

- 1 March 2009

All 36 seats in the Landtag of Carinthia 19 seats needed for a majority
- Turnout: 362,680 (82.8%) ▲3.1%
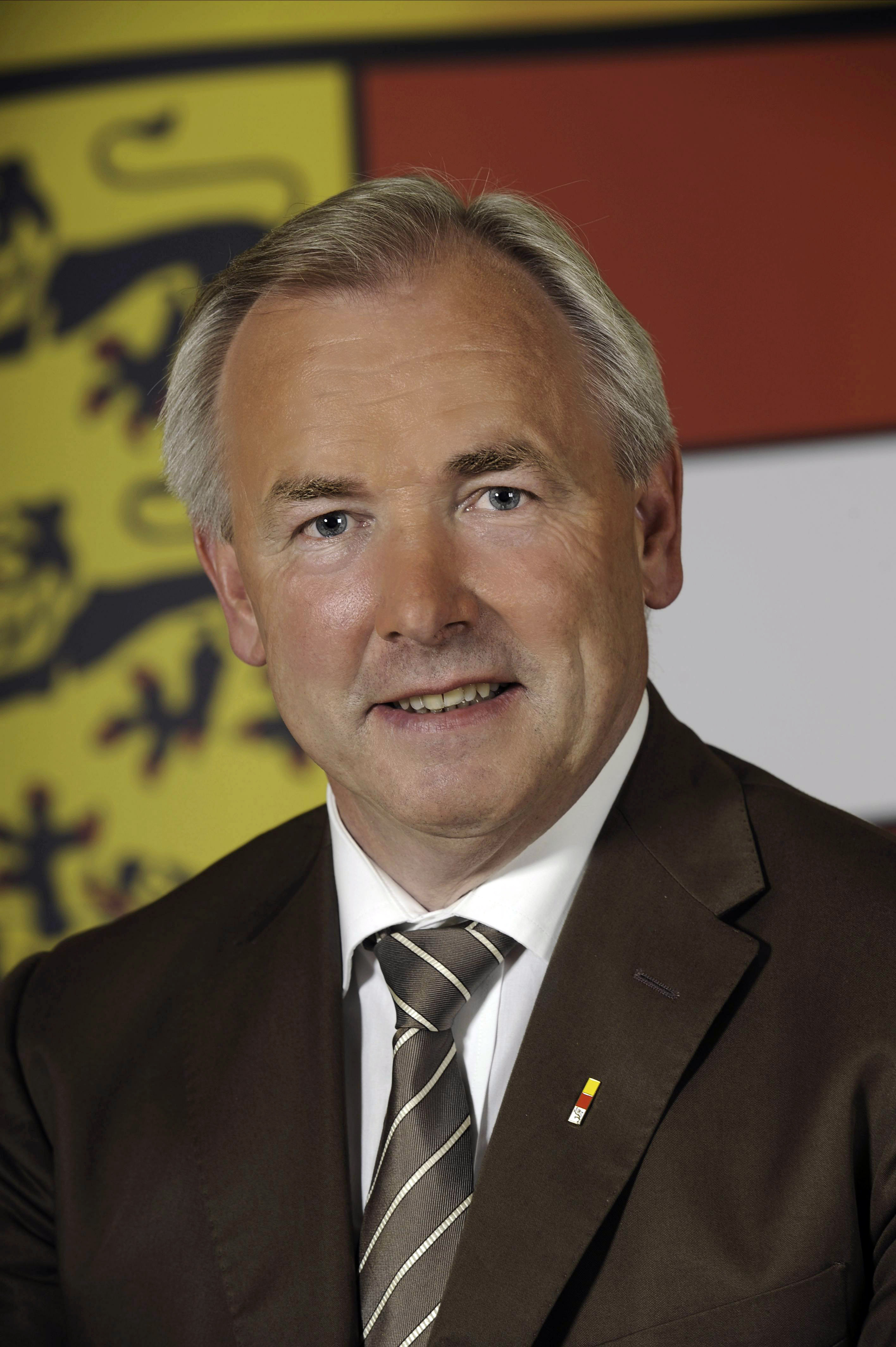

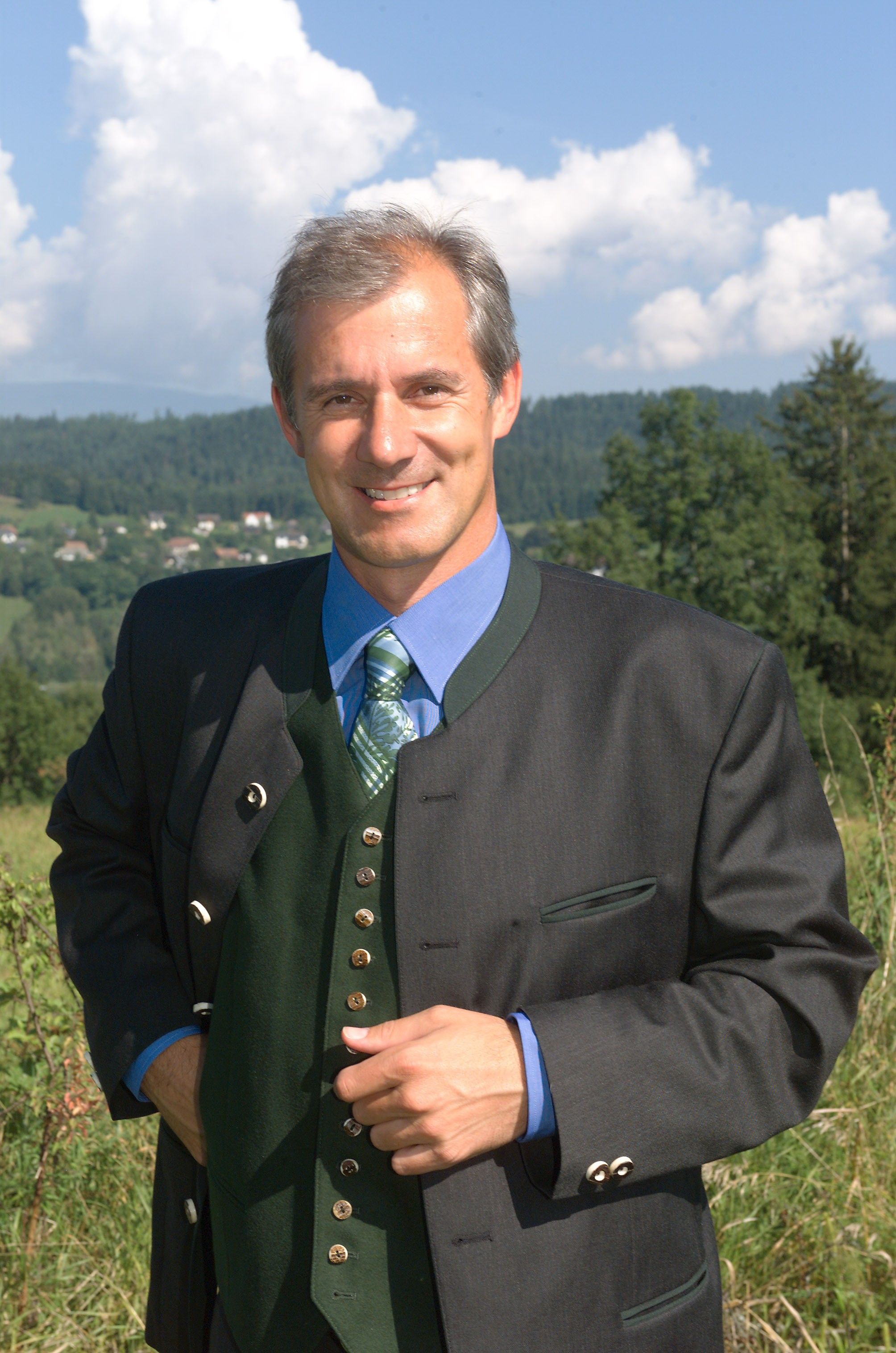

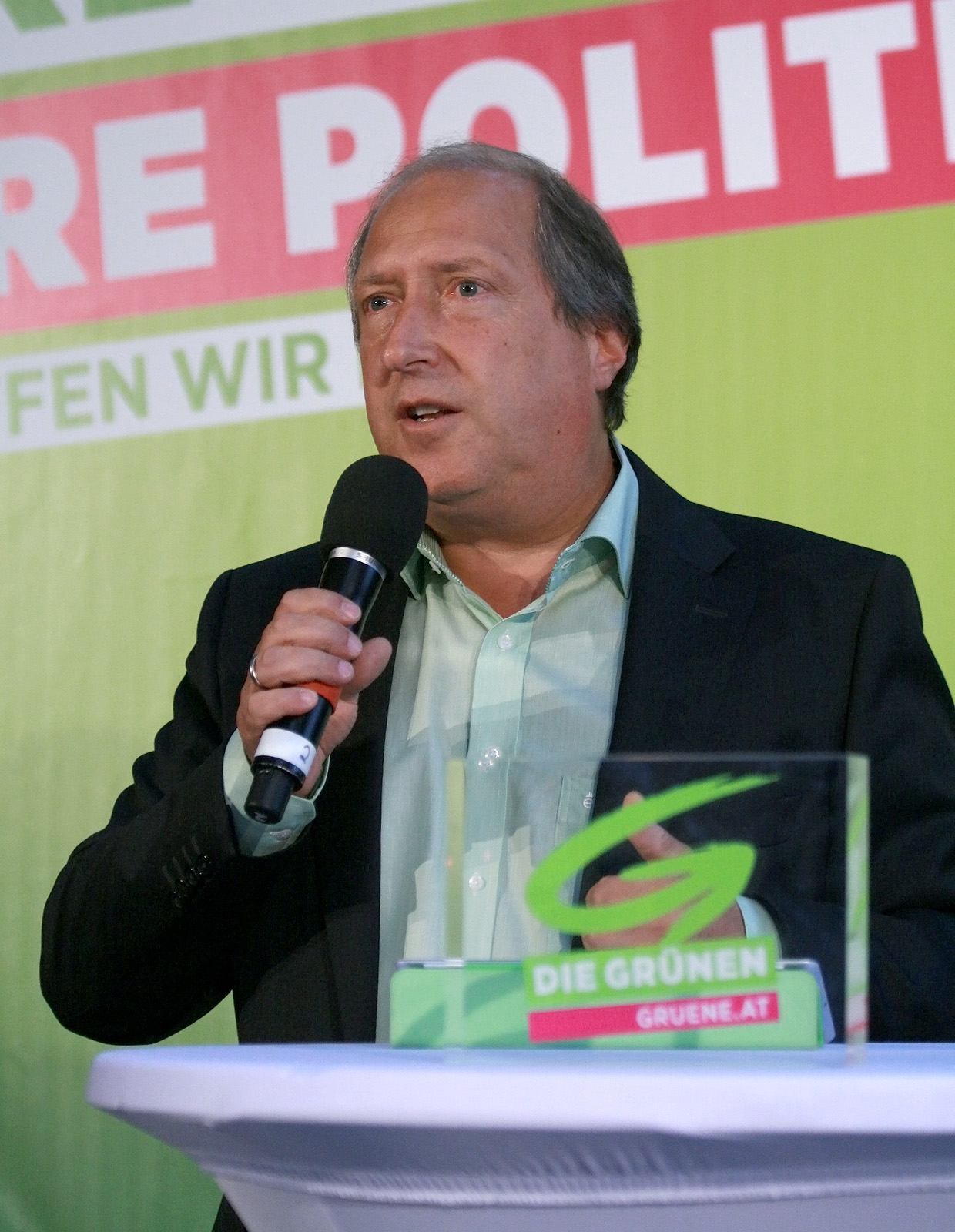
	First party	Second party
Leader	Gerhard Dörfler	Reinhart Rohr
Party	FPK	SPÖ
Last election	16 seats, 42.4%	14 seats, 38.4%
Seats won	17	11
Seat change	▲1	▼3
Popular vote	159,926	102,385
Percentage	44.9%	28.7%
Swing	▲2.5%	▼9.7%
	Third party	Fourth party
Leader	Josef Martinz	Rolf Holub
Party	ÖVP	Greens
Last election	4 seats, 11.6%	2 seats, 6.7%
Seats won	6	2
Seat change	▲2	0
Popular vote	59,955	18,336
Percentage	16.8%	5.1%
Swing	▲5.2%	▼1.6%
Governor before election
Gerhard Dörfler
FPK
Elected Governor
Gerhard Dörfler
FPK

The 2009 Carinthian state election was held on 1 March 2009 to elect the members of the Landtag of Carinthia.

The election took place five months after the death of Governor Jörg Haider, long-time leader of the Freedom Party in Carinthia (FPK). He was succeeded by Gerhard Dörfler. The FPK had split from the Freedom Party of Austria (FPÖ) when Haider formed the Alliance for the Future of Austria in 2005, and without its veteran leader, the party's future was uncertain. Nonetheless, Dörfler managed to retain the FPK's position and even increase its voteshare to an all-time high of almost 45%. The opposition Social Democratic Party of Austria (SPÖ) suffered major losses, but remained in second place. The Austrian People's Party (ÖVP) made gains, and The Greens narrowly retained their seats. The FPÖ's new state branch won just 3.8% and failed to enter the Landtag at all.

The FPK managed to secure a majority in the state government for the first time, but was still two seats short in the Landtag. The party subsequently formed a coalition with the ÖVP.

== Background ==
Prior to amendments made in 2017, the Carinthian constitution mandated that cabinet positions in the state government (state councillors, German: Landesräten) be allocated between parties proportionally in accordance with the share of votes won by each; this is known as Proporz. As such, the government was a perpetual coalition of all parties that qualified for at least one state councillor.

In 2005, then-Governor and former federal leader of the Freedom Party of Austria (FPÖ) Jörg Haider split from the party due to internal disputes, and founded the Alliance for the Future of Austria (BZÖ). The Freedom Party in Carinthia, then the FPÖ's state branch and led by Haider, changed its allegiance and became the Carinthian branch of the BZÖ. The large majority of its leadership and structure followed, with only a small minority defecting to the FPÖ's new Carinthian branch. Shortly after the 2008 federal election, Haider was killed in a car accident. He was succeeded by Gerhard Dörfler, who became the new Governor of Carinthia and leader of the FPK. Dörfler led the party to the 2009 state election under the name "Freedom Party in Carinthia – BZÖ List Jörg Haider". The FPÖ launched a new Carinthian state branch, hoping to challenge the FPK's dominance.

== Electoral system ==
The 36 seats of the Landtag of Carinthia are elected via open list proportional representation in a two-step process. The seats are distributed between four multi-member constituencies. For parties to receive any representation in the Landtag, they must either win at least one seat in a constituency directly, or clear a 5 percent state-wide electoral threshold. Seats are distributed in constituencies according to the Hare quota, with any remaining seats allocated using the D'Hondt method at the state level, to ensure overall proportionality between a party's vote share and its share of seats.

== Contesting parties ==
The table below lists parties represented in the previous Landtag.

Name		Ideology	Leader	2004 result		
Name		Ideology	Leader	Votes (%)	Seats	Councillors
FPK	Freedom Party in Carinthia – BZÖ List Jörg Haider; Die Freiheitlichen in Kärnten – BZÖ Liste Jörg Haider	Right-wing populism Euroscepticism	Gerhard Dörfler	42.4%	16 / 36	3 / 7
SPÖ	Social Democratic Party of Austria; Sozialdemokratische Partei Österreichs	Social democracy	Reinhart Rohr	38.4%	14 / 36	3 / 7
ÖVP	Austrian People's Party; Österreichische Volkspartei	Christian democracy	Josef Martinz	11.6%	4 / 36	1 / 7
GRÜNE	The Greens – The Green Alternative; Die Grünen – Die Grüne Alternative	Green politics	Rolf Holub	6.7%	2 / 36	

In addition to the parties already represented in the Landtag, six parties collected enough signatures to be placed on the ballot.

- Freedom Party of Austria (FPÖ)
- Communist Party of Austria (KPÖ)
- List Strong (STARK)
- Gaddafi Party of Austria (GPÖ)

== Results ==
Party	Votes	%	+/−	Seats	+/−	Coun.	+/−
Freedom Party in Carinthia – BZÖ List Jörg Haider (FPK)	159,926	44.89	+2.46	17	+1	4	+1
Social Democratic Party of Austria (SPÖ)	102,385	28.74	–9.69	11	–3	2	–1
Austrian People's Party (ÖVP)	59,955	16.83	+5.19	6	+2	1	±0
The Greens – The Green Alternative (GRÜNE)	18,336	5.15	–1.56	2	±0	0	±0
Freedom Party of Austria (FPÖ)	13,383	3.76	New	0	New	0	New
Communist Party of Austria (KPÖ)	1,893	0.53	–0.06	0	±0	0	±0
List Strong (STARK)	208	0.06	New	0	New	0	New
Gaddafi Party of Austria (GPÖ)	188	0.05	New	0	New	0	New
Invalid/blank votes	6,406	–	–	–	–	–	–
Total	362,680	100	–	36	0	7	0
Registered voters/turnout	443,499	81.78	–3.15	–	–	–	–
Source: Carinthian Government

Popular vote
FPK	44.89%
SPÖ	28.74%
ÖVP	16.83%
GRÜNE	5.15%
FPÖ	3.76%
Other	0.63%

Landtag seats
FPK	47.22%
SPÖ	30.56%
ÖVP	16.67%
GRÜNE	5.56%

=== Results by constituency ===
Constituency	FPK		SPÖ		ÖVP		Grüne		FPÖ		Others	Total seats	Turnout
Constituency	%	S	%	S	%	S	%	S	%	S	%	Total seats	Turnout
Klagenfurt	41.8	3	27.1	2	16.9	1	8.6		4.4		1.1	6	78.0
Carinthia East	47.0	4	28.5	2	16.7	1	4.0		3.4		0.5	7	84.3
Villach	42.7	3	34.4	2	13.6	1	4.9		3.8		0.6	6	79.7
Carinthia West	47.4	4	25.8	2	19.7	1	3.2		3.5		0.4	7	85.0
Remaining seats		3		3		2		2				10	
Total	44.9	17	28.7	11	16.8	6	5.2	2	3.8		0.6	36	81.8
Source: Carinthian Government
