= Peter Kaiser =

Austrian politician

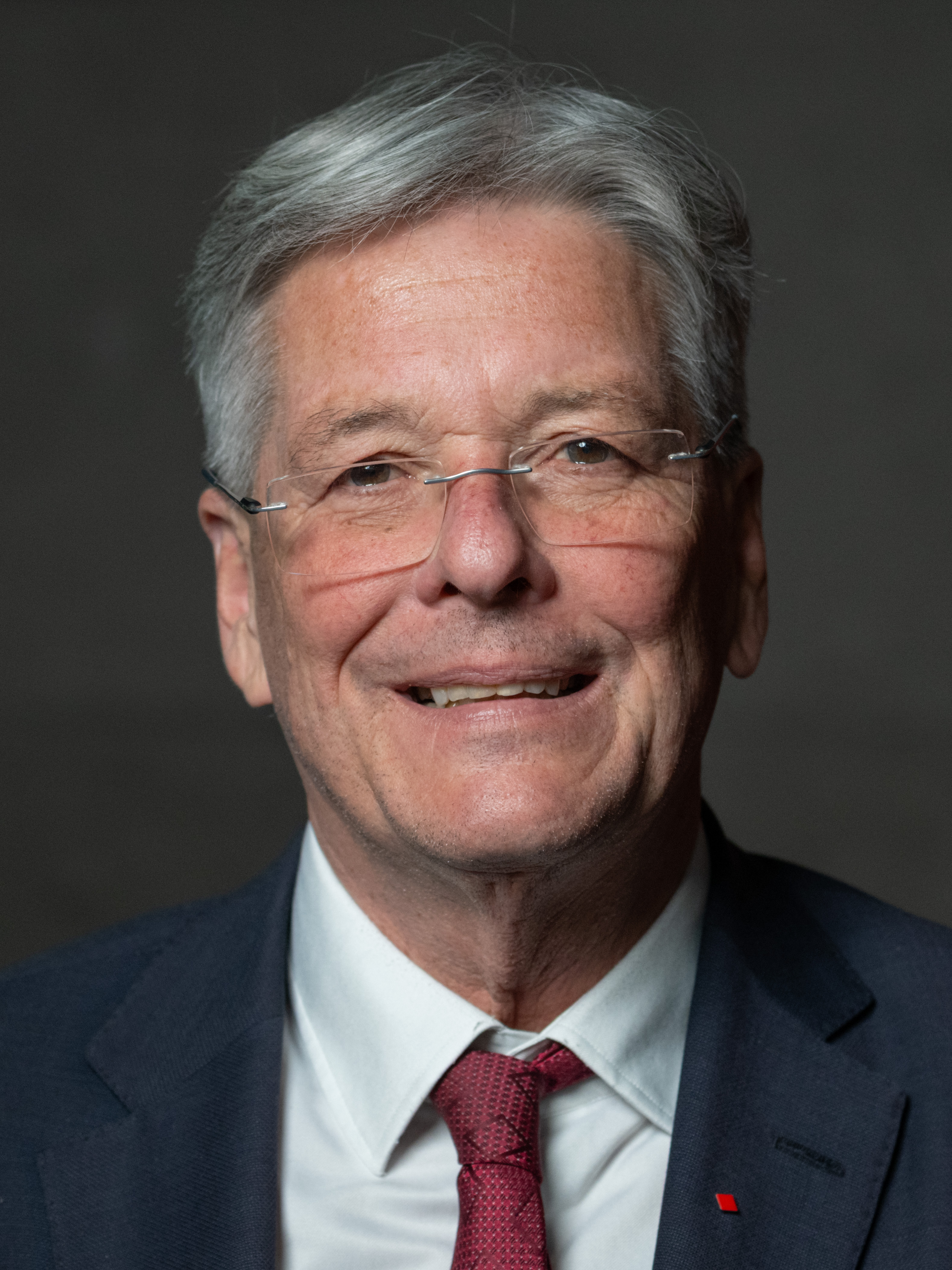
- Peter Kaiser in 2026

Governor of Carinthia
- In office 28 March 2013 – 31 March 2026
- Deputy: Gaby Schaunig (SPÖ); Beate Prettner (SPÖ)
- Preceded by: Gerhard Dörfler
- Succeeded by: Daniel Fellner

Chairman of the SPÖ Carinthia
- Incumbent
- Assumed office March 2010
- Federal chair: Christian Kern; Pamela Rendi-Wagner
- Preceded by: Reinhart Rohr

Personal details
- Born: 4 December 1958 (age 67) Klagenfurt, Carinthia, Austria
- Party: Social Democratic Party
- Spouse: Larissa Krainer (divorced)
- Children: 1 son
- Education: University of Klagenfurt
- Website: Official Website

Peter Kaiser (born 4 December 1958) is an Austrian politician of the Social Democratic Party who served as governor of Carinthia from 2013 until 2026.

== Education ==
From 1978 to 1987 Kaiser worked as a contractual employee of the Carinthian state government, at the same time he studied sociology and education at the University of Klagenfurt. In 1988 he became Magister and five years later he was promoted to doctor of philosophy.

== Political career ==
Kaiser took his first politician position in 1981 as chairman of the Carinthian socialist youth, later in 1986 he became member of the Carinthian Gemeinderat and held this office until 1989. Kaiser was member of the Carinthian Landtag from 1989 to 1994, 1997, 2001 to July 2008, and from November 2005 on as parliamentary leader of the SPÖ. In July 2008 he became state consultant for health and sports. In 2010 Kaiser succeeded Reinhart Rohr (who left the government) as chairman of the SPÖ Carinthia and thus became second deputy governor. Beate Prettner replaced Kaiser in his position as state councilor.

On 3 March 2013 the SPÖ became the biggest party again for the first time since 1994, through Kaiser as their top-candidate after the 2013 Carinthian state elections. Subsequently, he was elected governor by the Carinthian Landtag with 30 of 36 votes, and thus succeeded former officeholder Gerhard Dörfler of the Freedom Party. At his inaugural speech Kaiser spoke some words in Slovenian, the second regional language, he was the first Carinthian head of government to do so. On 2 April 2013 Kaiser was sworn in as governor of Carinthia by Federal President Heinz Fischer.

At the 2018 Carinthian state election the SPÖ once again grew bigger by gaining 10.8 percentage points under Kaiser as their top candidate. On 16 April 2018 he was officially confirmed in his position by President Alexander Van der Bellen.

== Personal life ==
Kaiser was married to Larissa Krainer and has a son. Besides his political functions Kaiser has been involved for the Carinthian Volleyball union and the Jugendherbergswesen (Hostelling International).
