= Gerhard Dörfler =

Austrian politician

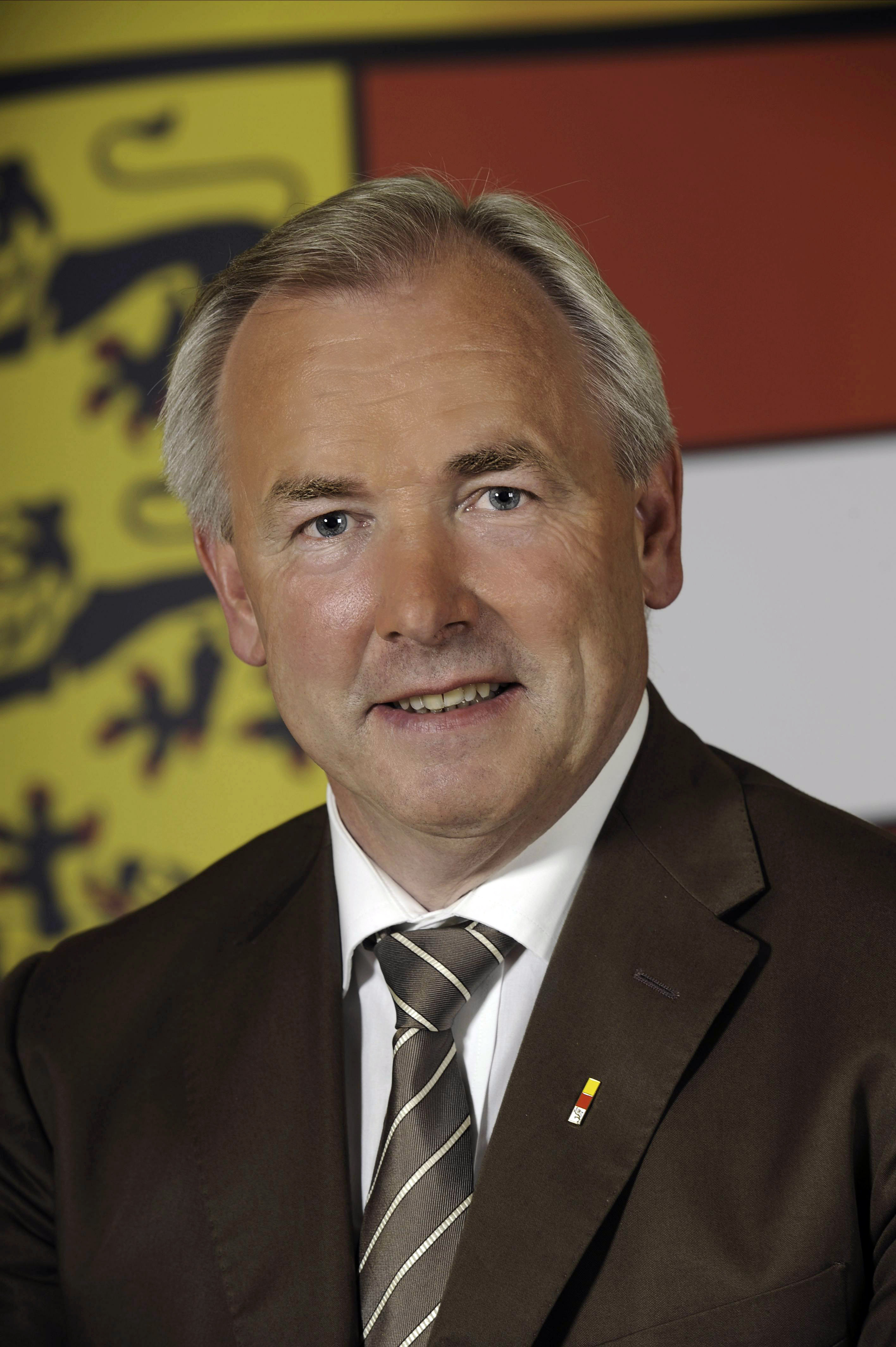

Governor of Carinthia
- In office 27 October 2008 – 28 March 2013; Acting: 11 October 2008 – 27 October 2008
- Preceded by: Jörg Haider
- Succeeded by: Peter Kaiser

Personal details
- Born: 29 May 1955 (age 70) Deutsch-Griffen, Austria
- Party: FPK
- Spouse: Margreth
- Children: Karin, Stephanie
- Profession: Banker

Gerhard Dörfler (born 29 May 1955) is an Austrian politician, who served as Governor of Carinthia from 27 October 2008 (acting since 11 October), following Governor Jörg Haider's sudden death in a car accident, to 28 March 2013.

Dörfler is a member of the Freedom Party in Carinthia (FPK). Until 2017 he served in the Federal Council, where he represented his home state Carinthia.

Political offices
Preceded by Jörg Haider	Governor of Carinthia; 2008–2013	Succeeded by Peter Kaiser
