= Team Stronach =

Former political party in Austria

- Leader: Frank Stronach
- Founder: Frank Stronach
- Founded: 27 September 2012
- Dissolved: August 2017
- Headquarters: Magna Straße 1; 2522 Oberwaltersdorf; Lower Austria
- Ideology: Economic liberalism; Right-wing populism; Populism; Euroscepticism
- Political position: Centre-right to right-wing

Website
- www.teamstronach.at

The Team Stronach for Austria (German: Team Stronach für Österreich) was a Eurosceptic, right-wing populist political party in Austria founded by and named after Austrian-Canadian businessman Frank Stronach. It was dissolved in August 2017.

== History ==
The new party was registered on 25 September 2012, and was launched two days later.

In a Gallup poll in August 2012, it received 8% of the vote. Five MPs – Gerhard Köfer of the Social Democratic Party of Austria (SPÖ), Elisabeth Kaufmann-Bruckberger and Christoph Hagen of the Alliance for the Future of Austria (BZÖ), and independents Robert Lugar and Erich Tadler – agreed to join the party.

Parties with at least three seats are automatically qualified to run in the forthcoming federal election.

The party name, programme, and logo were decided in early September 2012. Köfer was named as the party's leading candidate for the 2013 state election in Carinthia. In September's Gallup poll, it received 10% of the vote.

At the party's campaign launch for the 2013 federal election, the party unveiled a political advertisement featuring personal endorsements for Stronach from Bill Clinton and Larry King. By this time, the party polled between 10% and 12%. After the defection of a fifth MP, Stefan Markowitz, Team Stronach was given official party status in the National Council: giving the party €1.4m of state funding and places on parliamentary committees.

The party won 11% of the vote in the March 2013 state election in Carinthia, only narrowly falling behind The Greens and the Austrian People's Party (ÖVP). On the same day, Team Stronach won 10% of the vote in the Lower Austria state election, in third place. The result in Lower Austria gave Team Stronach its first seat in the Federal Council, held by Gerald Zelina.

On 29 September 2013 Team Stronach participated for the first time in the elections for the Austrian National Parliament. It got 5.73% of the votes and won 11 seats, being the fifth largest party in the new Austrian parliament. The party did not contest the 2014 European parliamentary election. After the election the party fell considerably in the polls. On 3 June 2015, two of the party's deputies - Georg Vetter and Marcus Franz - defected to the ÖVP, leaving it with nine seats. In August 2017 the planned dissolution of the Team Stronach was announced for after the legislative election. Its MPs changed to the FPÖ, the FLÖ and the Whites.

== Ideology ==
The Team Stronach supported Austria leaving the Euro currency and introducing an Austrian Euro instead. An advisor of the Team Stronach suggested later in an interview with news magazine "Format" that they wanted to keep the Euro but introduce additional national currencies.

Unlike some other right-wing Eurosceptic parties, Stronach was not as opposed to immigration as others. The party advocated cutting bureaucracy and instituting a 25% flat-rate income tax. The Team Stronach supported ending conscription and introducing an all-volunteer army instead. Stronach supported electoral reform, including the use of primary elections.
