= Free Party Salzburg =

- Leader: Karl Schnell
- Founded: June 2015
- Dissolved: 24 March 2019
- Split from: Freedom Party of Austria
- Ideology: Right-wing populism Euroscepticism
- Political position: Right-wing
- National Council: 0 / 183
- Federal Council: 0 / 61
- State Parliaments: 0 / 440

Website
- fps-salzburg.at (in German)

Free Party Salzburg (German: Freie Partei Salzburg, FPS) was a political party in Austria active in the State of Salzburg.

== History ==
The FPS was established in June 2015 as a split from the Freedom Party of Austria (FPÖ). Prior to the split conflicts had occurred between the FPÖ's federal party leader Heinz-Christian Strache and the former chairman of the Salzburg state branch Karl Schnell.

On 9 June 2015, Strache quickly expelled the previous acting as national party chairman Rupert Doppler from the FPÖ. Five of the six FPÖ MPs in Salzburg Parliament, as well as two Members of Parliament and a Federal Councillor joined. Between the FPS and the FPÖ's remaining Salzburg state branch, a conflict over the party name and the allocation of subsidies developed. Initially called Freiheitliche Partei Salzburgs ("Freedom Party of Salzburg"), the party had to change its name after a court had ruled that it was too similar to the FPÖ's name. In the 2017 Austrian legislative election the party participated nationwide as Free List Austria (Freie Liste Österreich/FLÖ).

== Political positions ==
For the legislative election 2017, the FLÖ has set three main goals: stopping Islamic immigration, introducing direct democracy and exiting the European Union.
