= Proporz =

Political history of Austria

Proporz (German: [pʁoˈpɔʁts], from German: Proportionalität, "proportionality") is a long-standing practice in the Second Austrian Republic in which positions in government are distributed between political parties in a manner proportional to their electoral or public support. More broadly, it describes a culture of power sharing and consensus between Austria's two major parties, the Austrian People's Party (ÖVP) and the Social Democratic Party of Austria (SPÖ), which developed throughout the period of grand coalition government from 1945 to 1966. During this time, partisan divisions were established in most government institutions, the nationalized industry, and the public service, designed to balance the influence of both parties.

Much of the system has been dismantled over time, particularly since the 1990s. While in 1999 all but one of the nine federal states operated Proporz systems, five have since formally abolished them. Some aspects, such as its application on a municipal level, endure to this day.

== Origins ==
After the re-establishment of Austrian independence in 1945 the country, however, remained under allied occupation until complete sovereignty was gained in 1955. The first, provisional, government under chancellor Karl Renner managed to steer clear of a division of the country.

There was a great desire to avoid the ideological factionalism that had characterised the First Austrian Republic (1919–1934), when the divide between the socialists on the left and Catholic conservatives on the right ultimately had led to the Austrian Civil War and ensuing Austrofascist dictatorship, which had ended in Austria's annexation by Nazi Germany in 1938.

This was exacerbated by the need for reconstruction in the wake of the Second World War, as well as Austria's precarious position between the Western Allies and the Soviet Union. These combined factors compelled the Austrian authorities to seek consensus and democratic stability in the new republic. All-party or "concentration" government was practised in both Allied-occupied Germany and Austria after the war – the provisional government of Karl Renner comprised a coalition of ÖVP, SPÖ, and the Communist Party of Austria (KPÖ) – but the development of Proporz truly began after the first national election. The ÖVP under Leopold Figl had won an absolute majority of seats (85 out of a total of 165), but nonetheless invited the SPÖ to join the cabinet: the new chancellor retained the three-party grand coalition alongside the Socialists and Communists.

== Development ==
=== Federal level ===
The federal grand coalition was renewed after every election until 1966. During the ensuing 21 years, an elaborate system was set up throughout the political and public service, in which partisan officials were appointed in an attempt to give approximately equal influence to both the ÖVP and SPÖ. Within the federal cabinet, state secretaries of one party were typically appointed to ministries controlled by the other. In addition, certain cabinet portfolios were nearly always awarded to one party or the other by convention; examples include the Ministry of Labour for the SPÖ and the Ministry of Agriculture for the ÖVP. On its own, this is in line with common practice in many countries with coalition government, but the extent to which the parties sought to institutionalise these divisions became synonymous with Proporz.

In 1949, Proporz was expanded to include the senior management of nationalized industry. After the success of the right-wing Federation of Independents in the 1949 election, the government sought to limit its influence by applying Proporz at all levels of administration. This included the Austrian "social partnership", in which workers, farmers, and employers are represented in government by four elected bodies. The SPÖ headed the Chamber of Labour and Austrian Trade Union Federation, while the ÖVP headed the Austrian Economic Chamber and Chamber of Agriculture.

From 1958 onwards, the Austrian Broadcasting Corporation (ORF) was headed by four officials – two from each party – with the ÖVP having responsibility for radio and the SPÖ for television, which at this stage was in its infancy. After the importance of television became clear, the parties began to wrestle for influence. This was resolved by a secret agreement made during negotiations for the second Gorbach government, in which the parties agreed that every senior position in radio and television be shared between a director from one party and deputy director from the other. After the agreement was leaked to the Kurier, the newspaper began a petition for a referendum to remove political influence over the ORF. The requirement of 200,000 signatures was overwhelmingly exceeded, with 832,353 received between 5 and 12 October 1964. However, the bill for the referendum never made it beyond committee in the National Council because the governing parties, which headed the committees, feared losing influence. A bill scrapping the ORF's Proporz arrangement was ultimately passed during the single-party ÖVP government of Josef Klaus in 1966, and came into effect in 1967.

Proporz, particularly the concept of consensus government, did not fade after the end of the first period of grand coalition. During the SPÖ majority governments of Bruno Kreisky in the 1970s and 1980s, the ÖVP was frequently consulted regarding government decisions and legislation; as such, the opposition was never truly shut out of decision-making.

=== State level ===
Proporz was written into the constitutions of most of the federal states in the 1940s. This particular implementation automatically entitled parties to cabinet positions if they won enough votes in state elections; in essence, proportional representation applied to the cabinet. Until 1999, every state government with the exception of Vorarlberg operated in this manner. This effectively meant that the typical conventions of parliamentary democracy did not apply, as the partisan composition of governments was determined automatically. However, investiture of cabinet ministers, including the Governor, typically required the approval of the state legislature.

Initially, this model effectively guaranteed the ÖVP and SPÖ joint dominance over state governments, as other parties were typically too small to win any more than one cabinet position. However, the rise in popularity of the Freedom Party of Austria (FPÖ) and The Greens from the 1980s onwards saw the major parties increasingly forced to share their power. This form of Proporz has since been repealed in most states; first in Salzburg and Tyrol in 1999, then Styria and Burgenland in 2015, and Carinthia in 2017. The model in Vienna, which is based on the municipal implementation, allows governments to deny portfolio to ministers from the opposition. The original system only remains in force in Lower Austria and Upper Austria.

=== Municipal level ===
Most cities' statutes still provide for Proporz in city council positions, much the same as on the state level. Graz, Linz, Salzburg, and Wiener Neustadt all have such regulations, and thus city councillors from the opposition.

== Criticism ==
Critics of Proporz characterised it as a form of political patronage and nepotism in which officials were appointed or received benefits on the basis of their party membership. They claimed the long-standing grand coalition fostered complacency and lack of direction in government. In Conflict and Freedom: Towards a Service Class Society (1972), Ralf Dahrendorf criticised the Proporz system: "The conversion of solidarity into individual action entails a withdrawal of energy from the battlefield and marketplace of politics." Sociologist and jurist Gustav Edward Kafka said in 1958 that Proporz had become so entrenched that "one could say with good reason that most of the provisions of formal constitutional law, including republican form of government, could be changed without profound consequences, as long as this principle [Proporz] remains in force; yet the return to free political competition would be tantamount to a revolution, though it would not require changing a comma in the constitution."

== Legacy ==
During Austria's first annual word of the year selection in 1999, the jury was tasked with choosing a "word of the century". They were unable to come to a decision, and instead chose Proporz as "word of the half-century". They stated "it has shaped Austrian politics and social life like no other term since 1945", and represents "the exact opposite dynamic than existed previously in political life".

== See also ==
- Politics of Austria
- History of Austria
- Pillarisation
- National Front (Colombia)
- Magic formula (Swiss politics)
- Clientelism
