= Wolfgang Kocevar =

Austrian politician (born 1969)

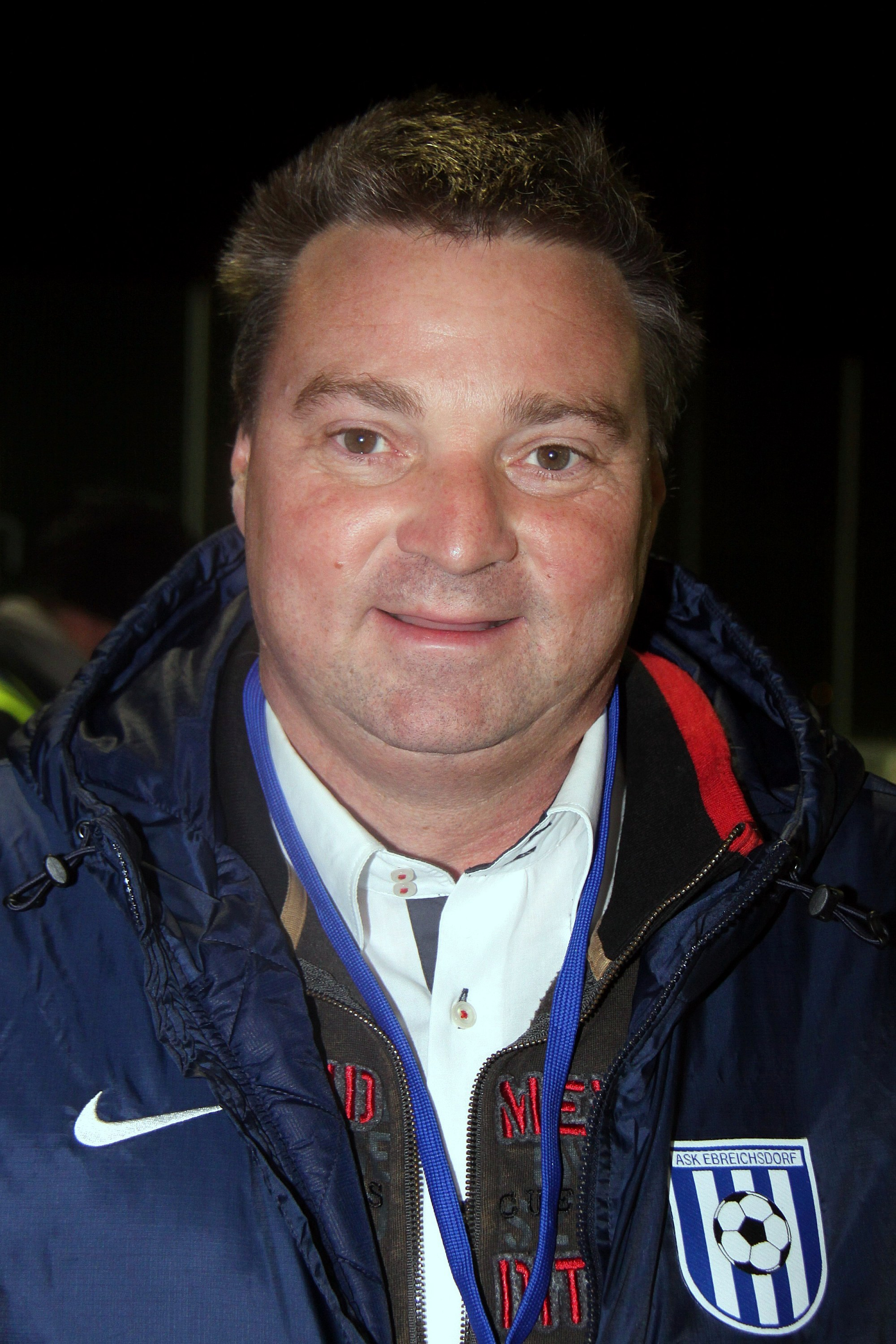
- Kocevar in October 2015

Member of the Landtag of Lower Austria
- Incumbent
- Assumed office 23 March 2023
- Constituency: State List

Personal details
- Born: 28 October 1969 (age 56) St. Pölten, Austria
- Party: Social Democratic Party

Wolfgang Kocevar (born 28 October 1969) is an Austrian politician and member of the Landtag of Lower Austria. A member of the Social Democratic Party, he has been a State List member since March 2023. He has been mayor of Ebreichsdorf since 2010.

Kocevar was born on 28 October 1969 in St. Pölten. He studied tourism and worked in the international tourism sector for 20 years. He worked for the Lower Austria branch of the Social Democratic Party (SPÖ) from 2007 to 2023. He was a member of the local council (gemeinderat) in Ebreichsdorf from 2000 to 2009. He was member of the municipal council (stadtrat) in Ebreichsdorf from 2009 to 2010 when he became mayor of the municipality. He was elected to the Landtag of Lower Austria at the 2023 state election.

Kocevar is married and has one child.
