= 2023 Lower Austrian state election =

State election in Austria

- 29 January 2023

All 56 seats in the Landtag of Lower Austria 29 seats needed for a majority All 9 seats in the state government
- Turnout: 922,253 (71.6%) ▲5.0%
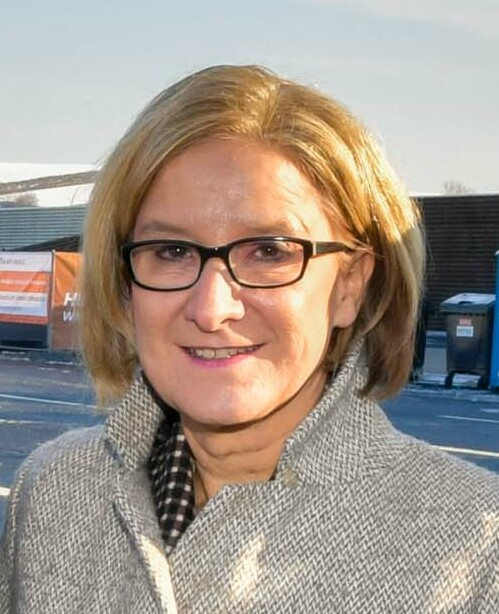

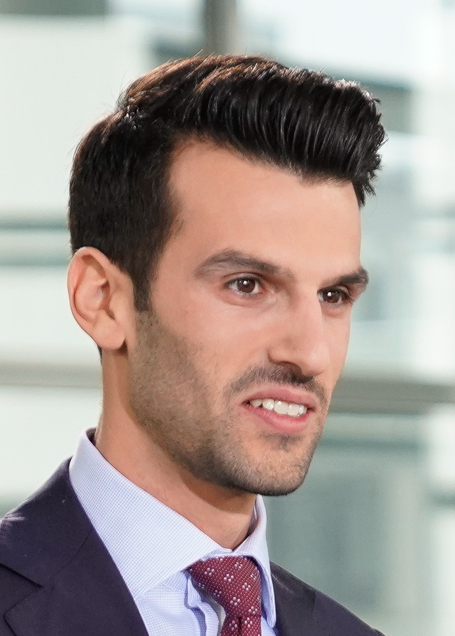

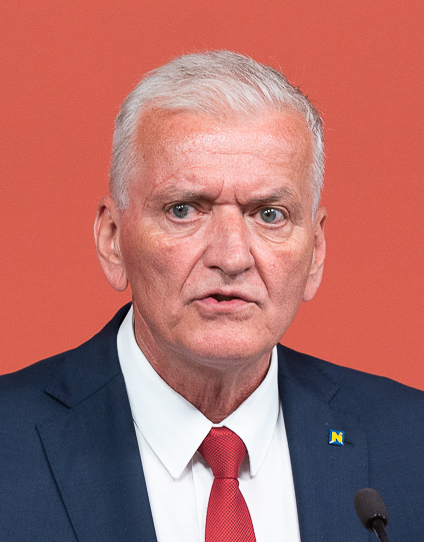

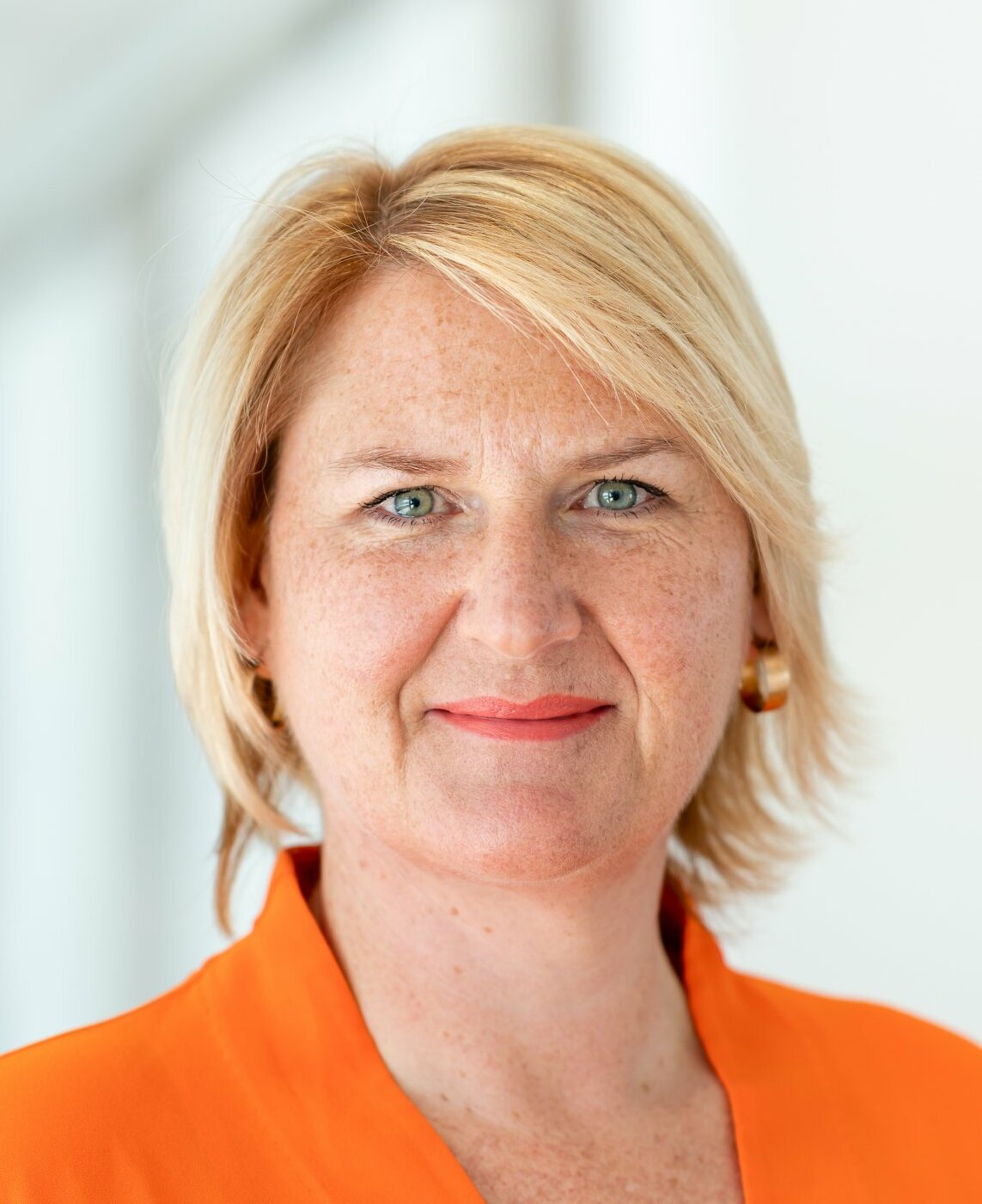

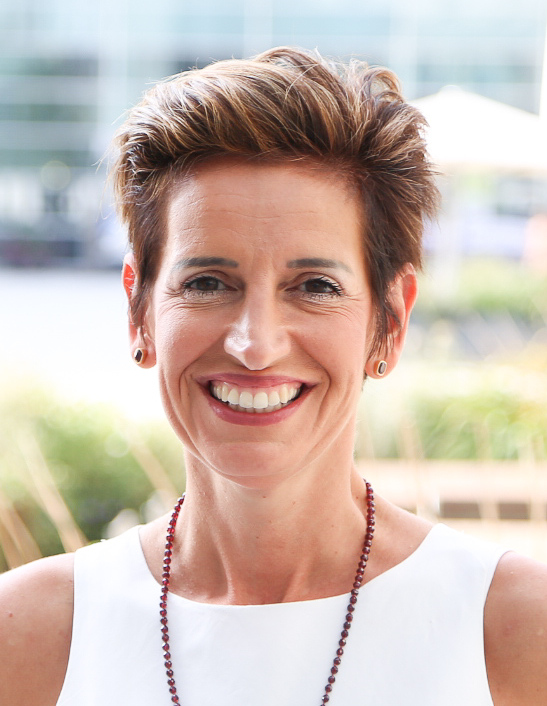
	First party	Second party	Third party
Leader	Johanna Mikl-Leitner	Udo Landbauer	Franz Schnabl
Party	ÖVP	FPÖ	SPÖ
Last election	29 seats, 49.6%	8 seats, 14.8%	13 seats, 23.9%
Seats won	23	14	12
Seat change	▼6	▲6	▼1
Popular vote	359,338	217,639	185,861
Percentage	39.9%	24.2%	20.7%
Swing	▼9.7%	▲9.4%	▼3.2%
	Fourth party	Fifth party
Leader	Helga Krismer	Indra Collini
Party	Greens	NEOS
Last election	3 seats, 6.4%	3 seats, 5.2%
Seats won	4	3
Seat change	▲1	0
Popular vote	68,276	60,024
Percentage	7.6%	6.7%
Swing	▲1.2%	▲1.5%
- Results by town/city
Governor before election
Johanna Mikl-Leitner
ÖVP
Elected Governor
Johanna Mikl-Leitner
ÖVP

The 2023 Lower Austrian state election was held on 29 January 2023 to elect the members of the Landtag of Lower Austria.

The ruling conservative ÖVP lost almost 10 percentage points and received slightly less than 40% of the vote, making it its worst election result in Lower Austria's history. As a result, the party also lost its absolute majority in the state parliament (23 of 56 seats, -9), and its absolute majority in the state government, losing two of its six seats.

The center-left SPÖ also had its worst election result in history, losing more than 3 percentage points and receiving 20.7% of the vote. They lost one seat in the Landtag but kept their two state councilors. For the first time since World War II, the SPÖ ended up in third place in a Lower Austrian state election.

The far-right populist FPÖ achieved their best election result yet, winning more than 24% of the vote, an increase of almost 10 percentage points. Their seat share in the Landtag increased by 6, to 14 seats. They added two seats to their current one in the state government. For the first time ever, they overtook SPÖ and landed in second place in a state election.

The environmentalist Greens improved their election results slightly, winning about 8% of the vote, up by just over 1 percentage point. They gained an additional seat in the Landtag and regained their parliamentary fraction status by winning a fourth seat again.

The liberal NEOS also improved their previous election result by more than 1 percentage point and received 6.7%, their best result yet and kept their three seats in the Landtag.

Both the Greens and NEOS failed to receive a seat in the nine-member state government.

Voter turnout was 71.6%, an increase of 5 percentage points from the previous election, reversing a long-time trend of falling turnout.

== Background ==
The Lower Austrian constitution mandates that cabinet positions in the state government (state councillors, German: Landesräte) be allocated amongst parties proportionally to the share of votes won by each; this is known as Proporz. As such, the government is a perpetual coalition of all parties that qualify for at least one state councillor. After the 2018 election, ÖVP had six councillors, the SPÖ two, and the FPÖ one. A party has to win at least 10 to 12 percent of the vote to receive a seat in the state government.

== Electoral system ==
The 56 seats of the Landtag of Lower Austria are elected via open list proportional representation in a two-step process. The seats are distributed between twenty multi-member constituencies. For parties to receive any representation in the Landtag, they must either win at least one seat in a constituency directly, or clear a four percent statewide electoral threshold. Seats are distributed in constituencies according to the Hare quota, with any remaining seats allocated using the D'Hondt method at the state level, to ensure overall proportionality between a party's vote share and its share of seats.

== Contesting parties ==
The table below lists parties represented in the previous Landtag.

Name		Ideology	Leader	2018 result		
Name		Ideology	Leader	Votes (%)	Seats	Councillors
ÖVP	Austrian People's Party; Österreichische Volkspartei	Conservatism	Johanna Mikl-Leitner	49.6%	29 / 56	6 / 9
SPÖ	Social Democratic Party of Austria; Sozialdemokratische Partei Österreichs	Social democracy	Franz Schnabl	23.9%	13 / 56	2 / 9
FPÖ	Freedom Party of Austria; Freiheitliche Partei Österreichs	Right-wing populism Euroscepticism	Udo Landbauer	14.8%	8 / 56	1 / 9
GRÜNE	The Greens – The Green Alternative; Die Grünen – Die Grüne Alternative	Green politics	Helga Krismer	6.4%	3 / 56	
NEOS	NEOS – The New Austria and Liberal Forum; NEOS – Das Neue Österreich und Liberales Forum	Liberalism	Indra Collini	5.2%	3 / 56	

Parties not currently represented in the state parliament of Lower Austria had until 23 December 2022 to submit the necessary signatures and paperwork to gain ballot access, either in individual constituencies or statewide.

In addition to the 5 parties represented in the state parliament, all of which are on the ballot statewide, another 3 parties gained ballot access:

- MFG Austria – People Freedom Fundamental Rights: (only in 5/20 constituencies: Baden, Krems, Mödling, St. Pölten and Tulln)
- KPÖ Plus – offene Liste: (only in 4/20 constituencies: Amstetten, Bruck an der Leitha, St. Pölten and Wiener Neustadt)
- ZIEL - Dein Ziel: (only in 1/20 constituencies: Amstetten)

== Campaign ==
After the Austrian ÖVP-led federal government vetoed Romania and Bulgaria's accession to the Schengen Area, it was accused of having done so out of fear of losing seats in the Lower Austrian state election, with the FPÖ rising in opinion polls.

== Opinion polling ==
Polling firm	Fieldwork date	Sample size	ÖVP	SPÖ	FPÖ	Grüne	NEOS	MFG	Others	Lead
2023 state election	29 Jan 2023	–	39.9	20.7	24.2	7.6	6.7	0.5	0.4	15.7
Market-Lazarsfeld/ÖSTERREICH	21–22 Jan 2023	800	38	23	25	6	7	–	1	13
OGM/Kurier	13–19 Jan 2023	1,048	37	23	26	6	7	–	1	11
Market/DER STANDARD	13–17 Jan 2023	800	39	23	24	6	7	–	1	15
Market-Lazarsfeld/ÖSTERREICH	11–12 Jan 2023	1,000	38	23	25	6	7	–	1	13
Unique Research/APA/ATV/Heute/Puls24	9–12 Jan 2023	1,200	40	22	25	6	6	–	1	15
AKONSULT/Bezirksblätter	4–10 Jan 2023	450	42	19	23	6	6	–	4	19
IFDD/NÖN	19–30 Dec 2022	800	42	24	19	7	7	–	1	18
IFDD/NÖN	3 Nov–2 Dec 2022	1,209	41	24	17	8	7	2	1	17
Market/DER STANDARD	14–18 Oct 2022	800	38	25	20	6	8	2	1	13
IFDD, Telemark/NÖN	15–23 Sep 2022	1,400	39	25	16	8	8	3	1	14
Market-Lazarsfeld/ÖSTERREICH	August 2022	745	32	29	21	5	9	4	–	3
IFDD/NÖN	24 Jun–1 Jul 2022	800	41	26	17	6	6	3	1	15
OGM/Kurier	29 Apr–5 May 2022	800	42	22	15	8	6	5	2	20
IFDD/NÖN	21–28 Jan 2022	800	44	22	14	6	7	6	1	22
IFDD/NÖN	10–18 Jun 2021	806	49	20	15	6	8	–	2	29
2018 state election	28 Jan 2018	–	49.6	23.9	14.8	6.4	5.2	–	0.1	25.7

== Results ==
Party	Votes	%	+/−	Seats	+/−	Coun.	+/−
Austrian People's Party (ÖVP)	359,338	39.93	–9.70	23	–6	4	–2
Freedom Party of Austria (FPÖ)	217,639	24.19	+9.43	14	+6	3	+2
Social Democratic Party of Austria (SPÖ)	185,861	20.65	–3.27	12	–1	2	±0
The Greens – The Green Alternative (GRÜNE)	68,276	7.59	+1.16	4	+1	0	–
NEOS – The New Austria (NEOS)	60,024	6.67	+1.52	3	±0	0	–
MFG Austria – People Freedom Fundamental Rights (MFG)	4,369	0.49	New	0	–	0	–
Communist Party of Austria (KPÖ Plus)	3,437	0.38	New	0	–	0	–
Your Goal (ZIEL)	893	0.10	New	0	–	0	–
Total valid votes	899,837	97.57					
Invalid/blank votes	22,416	2.43					
Total	922,253	100		56		9	
Registered voters/turnout	1,288,838	71.56	+5.00				
Source: Lower Austrian Government

=== Results by constituency ===
Constituency	ÖVP		SPÖ		FPÖ		Grüne		NEOS		Others	Total seats	Turnout
Constituency	%	S	%	S	%	S	%	S	%	S	%	Total seats	Turnout
Amstetten	36.69	1	20.44		27.73	1	6.81		5.91		2.42	2	75.75
Baden	32.83	1	27.97	1	23.00	1	7.91		7.06		1.22	3	66.60
Bruck an der Leitha	36.81	1	26.36		23.15		6.69		5.56		1.42	1	63.40
Gänserndorf	39.51	1	24.89		24.95		5.42		5.22			1	66.90
Gmünd	40.46		23.32		27.16		4.59		4.47				76.45
Hollabrunn	48.32	1	17.39		22.14		7.04		5.10			1	75.70
Horn	53.55		14.03		22.13		5.43		4.87				78.39
Korneuburg	42.46	1	18.68		20.02		10.28		8.56			1	70.06
Krems an der Donau	43.58	1	17.11		23.33		7.21		7.20		1.58	1	76.07
Lilienfeld	37.61		28.16		24.86		4.76		4.60				76.43
Melk	40.20	1	19.12		28.99	1	5.88		5.80			2	76.70
Mistelbach	48.07	1	17.12		22.34		6.72		5.76			1	74.98
Mödling	38.24	1	20.44		15.82		13.36		11.11		1.03	1	68.23
Neunkirchen	35.81	1	24.63		28.87	1	5.24		5.45			2	72.20
Sankt Pölten	36.40		20.98		23.09		9.52		7.43		2.58		70.73
Scheibbs	43.39		17.69		26.67		5.85		6.40				78.34
Tulln	42.65	1	16.90		19.65		10.60		8.77		1.44	1	71.32
Waidhofen an der Thaya	46.46		13.04		30.58		5.00		4.91				76.56
Wiener Neustadt	36.68	1	21.12		28.96	1	6.09		5.90		1.24	2	66.59
Zwettl	48.97	1	10.85		29.67		5.33		5.18			1	79.32
Remaining seats		9		11		9		4		3		36	
Total	39.93	23	20.65	12	24.19	14	7.59	4	6.67	3	0.97	56	71.56
Source: Lower Austrian Government

== Aftermath ==
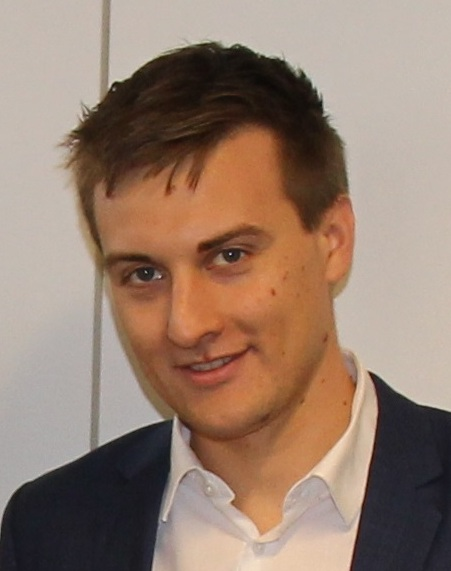
Sven Hergovich

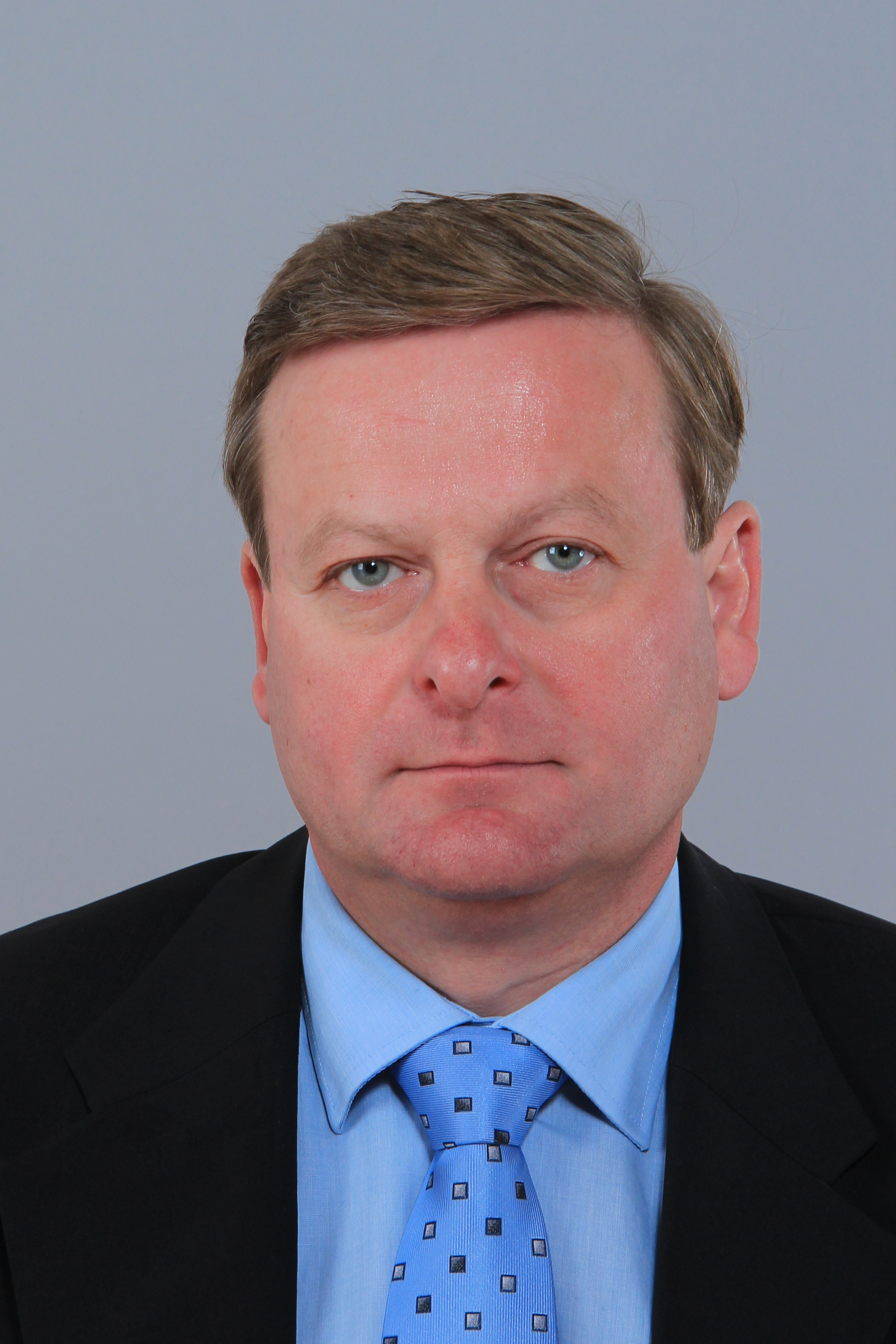
Gottfried Waldhäusl

After the election, the SPÖ replaced their party leader Franz Schnabl with Sven Hergovich - the current Lower Austrian leader of the Austrian Labor Market Service for the unemployed (AMS).

Due to the Proporz system in Lower Austria, the ÖVP now gets 4 of the 9 state government councilors, the FPÖ 3 and the SPÖ 2.

Official talks between the ÖVP and the other parties to create a possible coalition or working agreement in the newly elected Landtag started right after the election.

A widely perceived racist slur by FPÖ state councilor Gottfried Waldhäusl at a TV debate with high school students made a formal working agreement or coalition between the ÖVP and FPÖ unlikely - increasing instead the likelihood of a formal ÖVP-SPÖ working agreement or coalition in the Landtag. The widely perceived racist slur by FPÖ state councilor Gottfried Waldhäusl was followed by a propaganda attack on the school of the students who participated in the TV debate with Waldhäusl, with unknown perpetrators dropping xenophobic leaflets and posters on the school grounds. Waldhäusl's comments and the xenophobic attack on the school prompted all other parties to sharply condemn Waldhäusl and the FPÖ. Meanwhile, the FPÖ either defended Waldhäusl or remained silent. Erwin Angerer, FPÖ lead candidate for the upcoming 2023 Carinthian state election on 5 March, said that he wouldn't have phrased Waldhäusl's comments the way he did, distancing himself somewhat from his party colleague. The FPÖ's general secretary Michael Schnedlitz, as well as party leader Herbert Kickl defended Waldhäusl's comments, while the FPÖ-leaders of Upper Austria, Tyrol and Salzburg were critical, saying "well-integrated high school students with a migrant background are the wrong target for failed immigration policy". Salzburg, like Carinthia, will vote later this year in the 2023 Salzburg state election on 23 April.

On 14 February 2023, the ÖVP started in-depth coalition talks with the SPÖ.

On 9 March 2023, coalition talks between ÖVP and SPÖ were abruptly ended by the ÖVP after "unbridgeable differences", as well as "demands from the SPÖ that couldn't be agreed on". The new SPÖ-leader Sven Hergovich said "he would rather chop off his hand, than give in to the ÖVP". The SPÖ's demands included the introduction of all-day kindergarten care in Lower Austria, a statewide "job guarantee" for long-term unemployed, more heating benefits for poor people, better financial assistance for family members who perform long-term care for their ill/old family members and more investments into rural areas. The ÖVP said these demands would hurt the competitiveness of Lower Austria. The ÖVP will start in-depth talks with the FPÖ now about a possible coalition.

On 17 March, the new ÖVP-FPÖ coalition in the Lower Austrian state parliament (Landtag) was officially presented.

On 23 March, the new ÖVP-FPÖ coalition, the new ÖVP-FPÖ-SPÖ government and Governor Johanna Mikl-Leitner were officially elected by the new Landtag. The FPÖ cast invalid votes in the election of Mikl-Leitner as Governor, despite entering a coalition with her ÖVP, honoring their campaign pledge not to re-elect her. SPÖ, Greens and NEOS voted against her. She received 24 of the 41 valid votes, out of 56 total members in the Landtag, the lowest number of votes for any Governor of Lower Austria. It was also the first time a Lower Austrian Governor was elected by a minority of the total members in the Landtag.
