= 2018 Lower Austrian state election =

← 2013	28 January 2018	2023 →

All 56 seats in the Landtag of Lower Austria 29 seats needed for a majority All 9 seats in the state government
- Turnout: 922,807 (66.6%) ▼4.3%
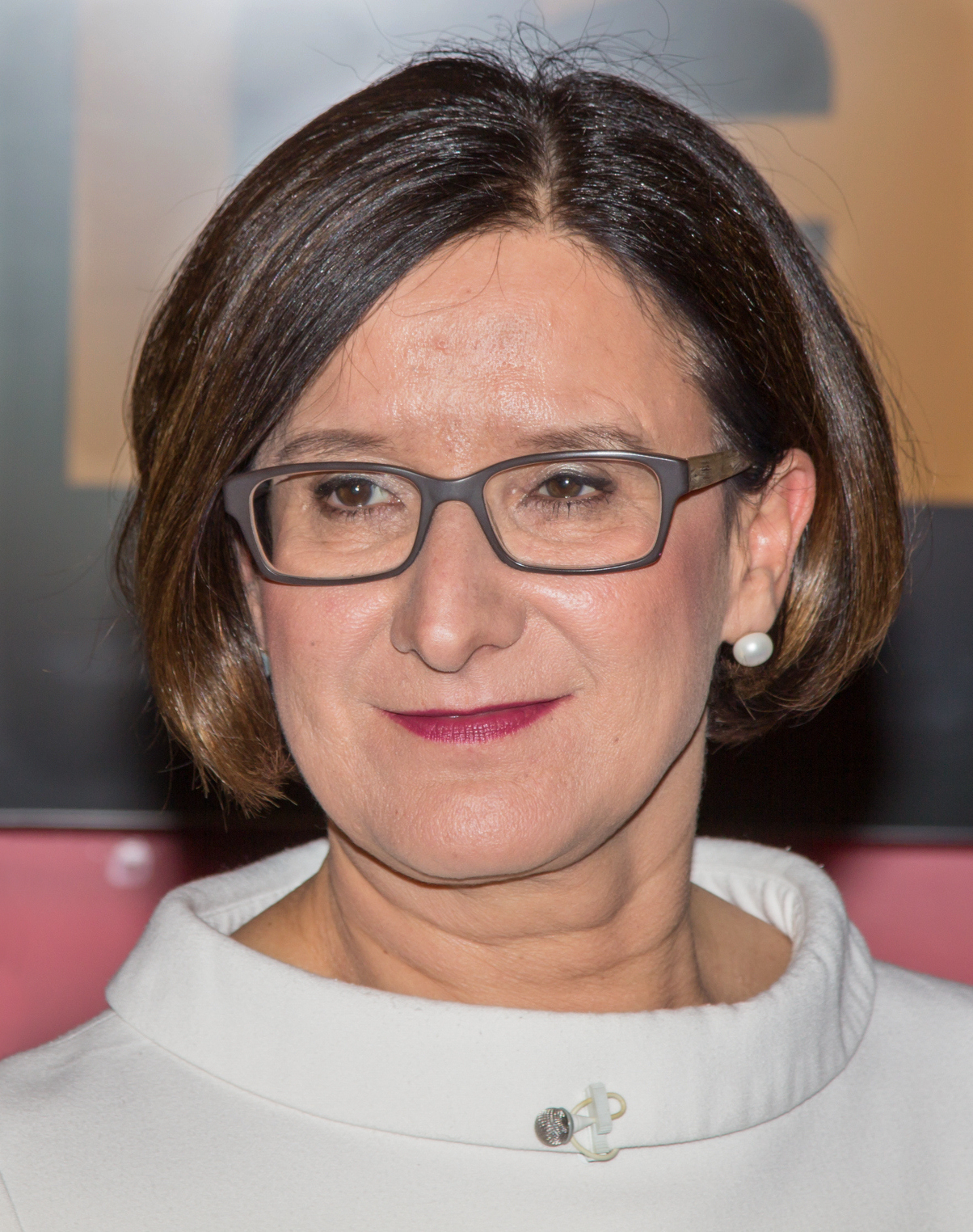

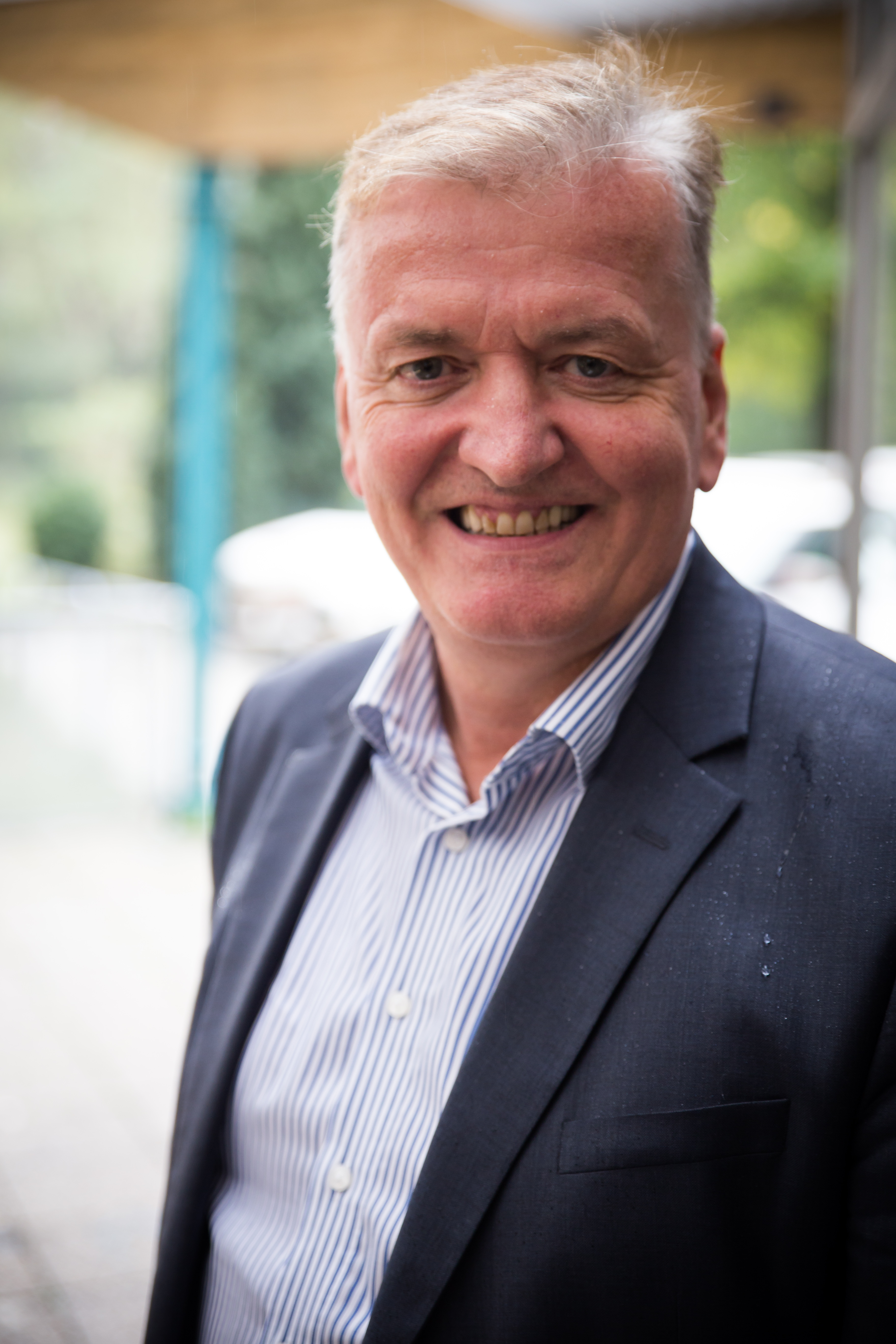

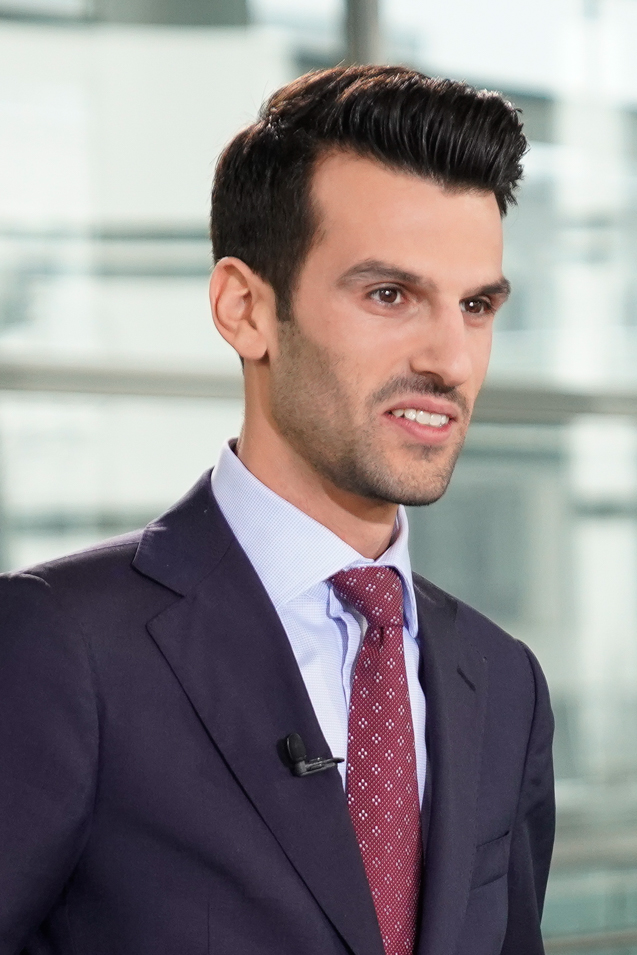

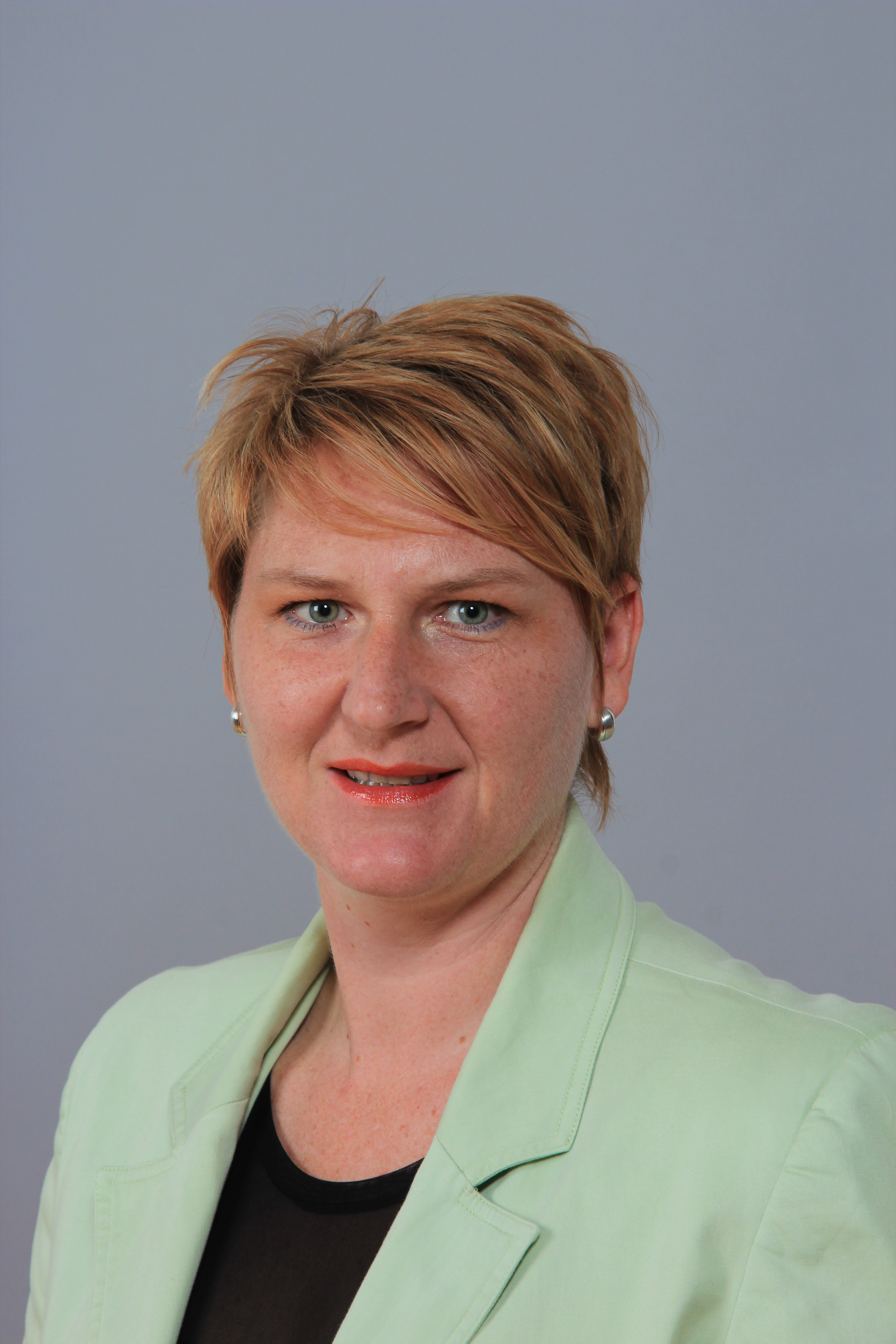

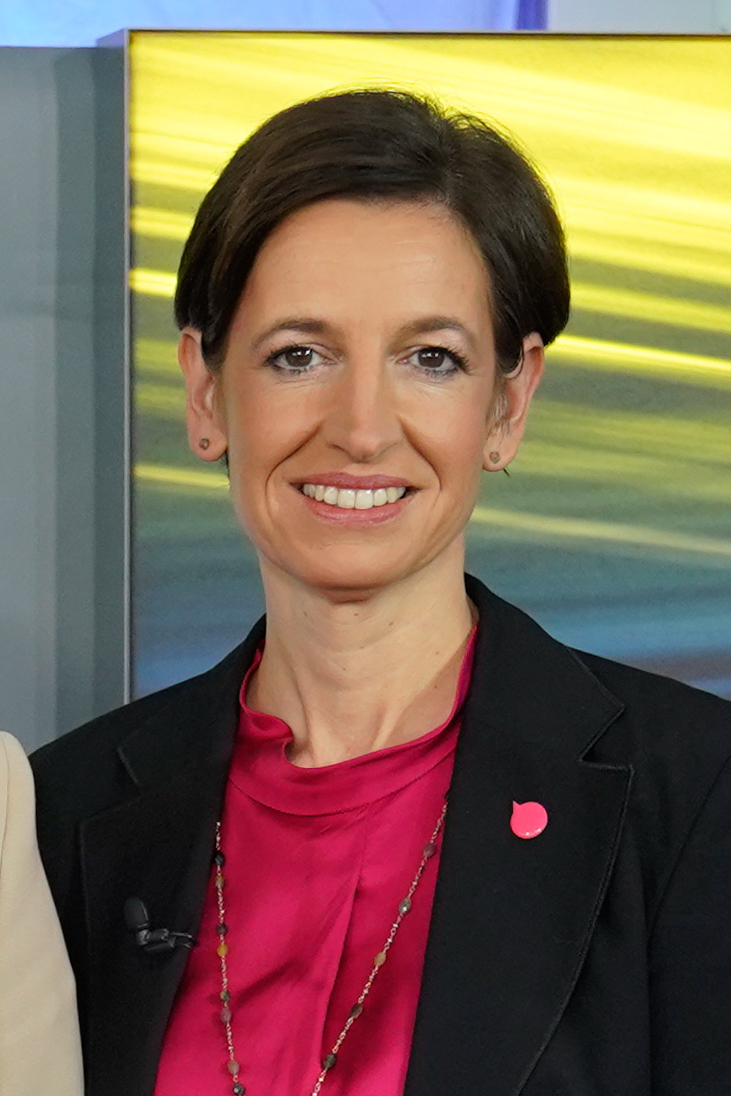
	First party	Second party	Third party
Leader	Johanna Mikl-Leitner	Franz Schnabl	Udo Landbauer
Party	ÖVP	SPÖ	FPÖ
Last election	30 seats, 50.8%	13 seats, 21.6%	4 seats, 8.2%
Seats won	29	13	8
Seat change	▼1	0	▲4
Popular vote	450,812	217,289	134,085
Percentage	49.6%	23.9%	14.8%
Swing	▼1.2%	▲2.3%	▲6.6%
	Fourth party	Fifth party
Leader	Helga Krismer	Indra Collini
Party	Greens	NEOS
Last election	4 seats, 8.1%	Did not contest
Seats won	3	3
Seat change	▼1	▲3
Popular vote	58,401	46,801
Percentage	6.4%	5.2%
Swing	▼1.6%	▲5.2%
- Results by municipality.
Governor before election
Johanna Mikl-Leitner
ÖVP
Elected Governor
Johanna Mikl-Leitner
ÖVP

The 2018 Lower Austrian state election was held on 28 January 2018 to elect the members of the Landtag of Lower Austria.

The ruling Austrian People's Party (ÖVP) fell just short of an absolute majority of votes, but retained its majority in the Landtag. Nonetheless, this was its worst result in the state since 1998. The Social Democratic Party of Austria (SPÖ) and Freedom Party of Austria (FPÖ) made gains, with the latter doubling its share of seats. The Greens took minor losses, while NEOS – The New Austria (NEOS) contested its first state election in Lower Austria, debuting at 5.2%. Team Stronach, which had won 9.8% in the previous election, did not compete.

== Background ==
The Lower Austrian constitution mandates that cabinet positions in the state government (state councillors, German: Landesräten) be allocated between parties proportionally in accordance with the share of votes won by each; this is known as Proporz. As such, the government is a perpetual coalition of all parties that qualify for at least one state councillor. After the 2013 election, the ÖVP had six councillors, the SPÖ two, and Team Stronach one.

== Electoral system ==
The 56 seats of the Landtag of Lower Austria are elected via open list proportional representation in a two-step process. The seats are distributed between twenty multi-member constituencies. For parties to receive any representation in the Landtag, they must either win at least one seat in a constituency directly, or clear a 4 percent state-wide electoral threshold. Seats are distributed in constituencies according to the Hare quota, with any remaining seats allocated using the D'Hondt method at the state level, to ensure overall proportionality between a party's vote share and its share of seats.

== Contesting parties ==
The table below lists parties represented in the previous Landtag.

Name		Ideology	Leader	2013 result		
Name		Ideology	Leader	Votes (%)	Seats	Councillors
ÖVP	Austrian People's Party; Österreichische Volkspartei	Christian democracy	Johanna Mikl-Leitner	50.8%	30 / 56	6 / 9
SPÖ	Social Democratic Party of Austria; Sozialdemokratische Partei Österreichs	Social democracy	Franz Schnabl	21.6%	13 / 56	2 / 9
FPÖ	Freedom Party of Austria; Freiheitliche Partei Österreichs	Right-wing populism Euroscepticism	Udo Landbauer	8.2%	4 / 56	
GRÜNE	The Greens – The Green Alternative; Die Grünen – Die Grüne Alternative	Green politics	Helga Krismer	8.1%	4 / 56	

Team Stronach, which contested the previous election and won 9.8% of votes, five seats, and one state councillor, did not contest the 2018 election.

In addition to the parties already represented in the Landtag, four parties collected enough signatures to be placed on the ballot.

- NEOS – The New Austria (NEOS)
- Christian Party of Austria (CPÖ) – on the ballot only in Amstetten, Melk, and Mödling
- We for Lower Austria (WFNOE) – on the ballot only in Baden

== Opinion polling ==
Polling firm	Fieldwork date	Sample size	ÖVP	SPÖ	FPÖ	Grüne	NEOS	Others	Lead
2018 state election	28 Jan 2018	–	49.6	23.9	14.8	6.4	5.2	0.1	25.7
Research Affairs	16–18 Jan 2018	413	45	23	21	5	5	1	22
OGM	8–16 Jan 2018	831	45	26	19	5	5	–	19
Public Opinion Strategies	2–11 Jan 2018	805	48	23	17	5	6	1	25
Market	January 2018	?	46	24	17	5	6	2	22
Unique Research	2–10 Jan 2018	500	47	23	18	5	5	2	24
Research Affairs	3–5 Jan 2018	410	45	22	21	4	5	3	23
SOZAB	30 Oct–25 Nov 2017	1,500	50	22	16	5	4	3	28
OGM	9–14 Nov 2017	784	45	25	20	4	4	2	20
2013 state election	3 Mar 2013	–	50.8	21.6	8.2	8.1	–	11.3 (Note: Including Team Stronach (9.8%), which did not contest the 2018 election.)	29.2

== Results ==
Party	Votes	%	+/−	Seats	+/−	Coun.	+/−
Austrian People's Party (ÖVP)	450,812	49.63	–1.16	29	–1	6	±0
Social Democratic Party of Austria (SPÖ)	217,289	23.92	+2.35	13	±0	2	±0
Freedom Party of Austria (FPÖ)	134,085	14.76	+6.55	8	+4	1	+1
The Greens – The Green Alternative (GRÜNE)	58,401	6.43	–1.63	3	–1	0	±0
NEOS – The New Austria (NEOS)	46,801	5.15	+5.15	3	+3	0	New
Christian Party of Austria (CPÖ)	584	0.06	–0.03	0	±0	0	±0
We for Lower Austria (WFNOE)	367	0.04	New	0	New	0	New
Invalid/blank votes	14,468	–	–	–	–	–	–
Total	922,807	100	–	56	0	9	0
Registered voters/turnout	1,386,356	66.56	–4.31	–	–	–	–
Source: Lower Austrian Government

Popular vote
ÖVP	49.63%
SPÖ	23.92%
FPÖ	14.76%
GRÜNE	6.43%
NEOS	5.15%
Other	0.10%

Landtag seats
ÖVP	51.78%
SPÖ	23.21%
FPÖ	14.28%
GRÜNE	5.36%
NEOS	5.36%

=== Results by constituency ===
Constituency	ÖVP		SPÖ		FPÖ		Grüne		NEOS		Others	Total seats	Turnout
Constituency	%	S	%	S	%	S	%	S	%	S	%	Total seats	Turnout
Amstetten	52.7	2	23.0	1	13.8		5.5		4.6		0.4	3	69.4
Baden	40.1	2	29.0	1	15.9		7.8		6.6		0.5	3	61.5
Bruck an der Leitha	41.7	1	30.3	1	17.0		6.3		4.7			2	60.7
Gänserndorf	46.4	1	28.2		16.5		5.3		3.6			1	62.5
Gmünd	53.9		26.1		13.3		3.5		3.2			0	69.5
Hollabrunn	58.1	1	19.7		13.2		5.4		3.6			1	70.4
Horn	65.0		15.8		11.7		4.1		3.4			0	72.7
Korneuburg	49.4	1	22.7		13.3		8.2		6.4			1	65.0
Krems an der Donau	54.0	1	20.2		14.1		6.1		5.6			1	70.4
Lilienfeld	48.6		29.5		13.8		4.4		3.6			0	72.1
Melk	52.4	1	22.7		16.0		4.6		3.9		0.4	1	70.8
Mistelbach	57.1	1	19.6		13.8		5.7		3.9			1	70.5
Mödling	43.4	1	23.0	1	11.4		11.7		10.2		0.3	2	64.1
Neunkirchen	45.5	1	28.9	1	17.1		4.6		3.9			2	66.2
Sankt Pölten	45.8	2	26.6	1	14.1		7.8		5.7			3	66.2
Scheibbs	59.5		20.1		12.1		4.4		3.9			0	72.4
Tulln	50.9	1	20.1		13.4		9.0		6.6			1	65.7
Waidhofen an der Thaya	55.0		16.8		20.4		4.5		3.3			0	69.8
Wiener Neustadt	45.7	2	26.6	1	18.3		4.8		4.6			3	63.0
Zwettl	63.4	1	13.1		15.6		4.3		3.6			1	73.2
Remaining seats		10		6		8		3		3		30	
Total	49.6	29	23.9	13	14.8	8	6.4	3	5.2	3	0.1	56	66.6
Source: Lower Austrian Government

=== Preference votes ===
Alongside votes for a party, voters were able to cast a preferential votes for a candidate on the party list. The ten candidates with the most preferential votes were as follows:

Party	Pos.	Candidate	Votes	%
ÖVP	1	Johanna Mikl-Leitner	186,133	77.4
FPÖ	1	Udo Landbauer	41,461	75.3
SPÖ	1	Franz Schnabl	39,950	58.8
ÖVP	2	Stefan Pernkopf	18,465	7.7
ÖVP	4	Karl Wilfing	7,491	3.1
ÖVP	6	Ludwig Schleritzko	7,091	2.9
GRÜNE	1	Helga Krismer	7,079	42.4
NEOS	1	Indra Collini	6,959	59.7
SPÖ	2	Karin Renner	4,309	6.3
FPÖ	2	Gottfried Waldhäusl	4,133	7.5

== Aftermath ==
The ÖVP retained its Landtag majority and six out of nine state councillors; the SPÖ also retained its two councillors. With the disappearance of Team Stronach, the FPÖ moved into third place on a strong swing, and won one state councillor.
