= Michael Schnedlitz =

Austrian politician (born 1984)

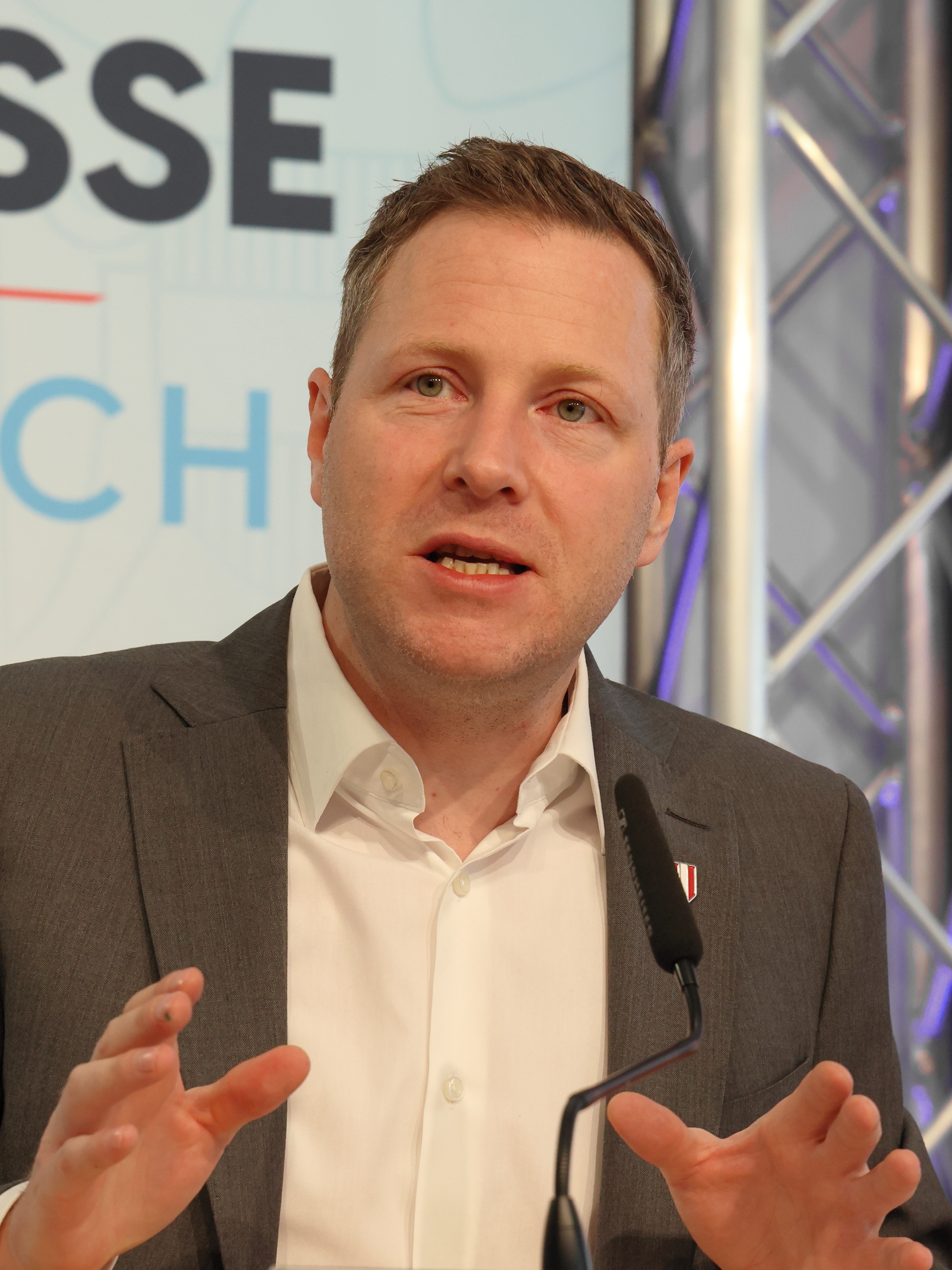
- Schnedlitz in 2026

General Secretary of the Freedom Party
- Incumbent
- Assumed office 30 January 2020 Serving with Christian Hafenecker (2023–present)
- Preceded by: Christian Hafenecker; Harald Vilimsky

Member of the National Council
- Incumbent
- Assumed office 23 October 2019
- Constituency: Lower Austria

Member of the Landtag of Lower Austria
- In office 22 March 2018 – 19 September 2018
- Succeeded by: Udo Landbauer

Personal details
- Born: 13 March 1984 (age 42)
- Party: Freedom Party of Austria

Michael Schnedlitz (born 13 March 1984) is an Austrian politician of the Freedom Party.

== Politics ==
Since 2019, he has been a member of the National Council. In 2020, he was elected general secretary of the Freedom Party. He was a member of the Landtag of Lower Austria in 2018 and has served as deputy mayor of Wiener Neustadt since 2015.

== Volunteer work ==
Schnedlitz is an elected board member of the Austrian Black Cross Lower Austria.
