= Indra Collini =

Austrian business economist and politician

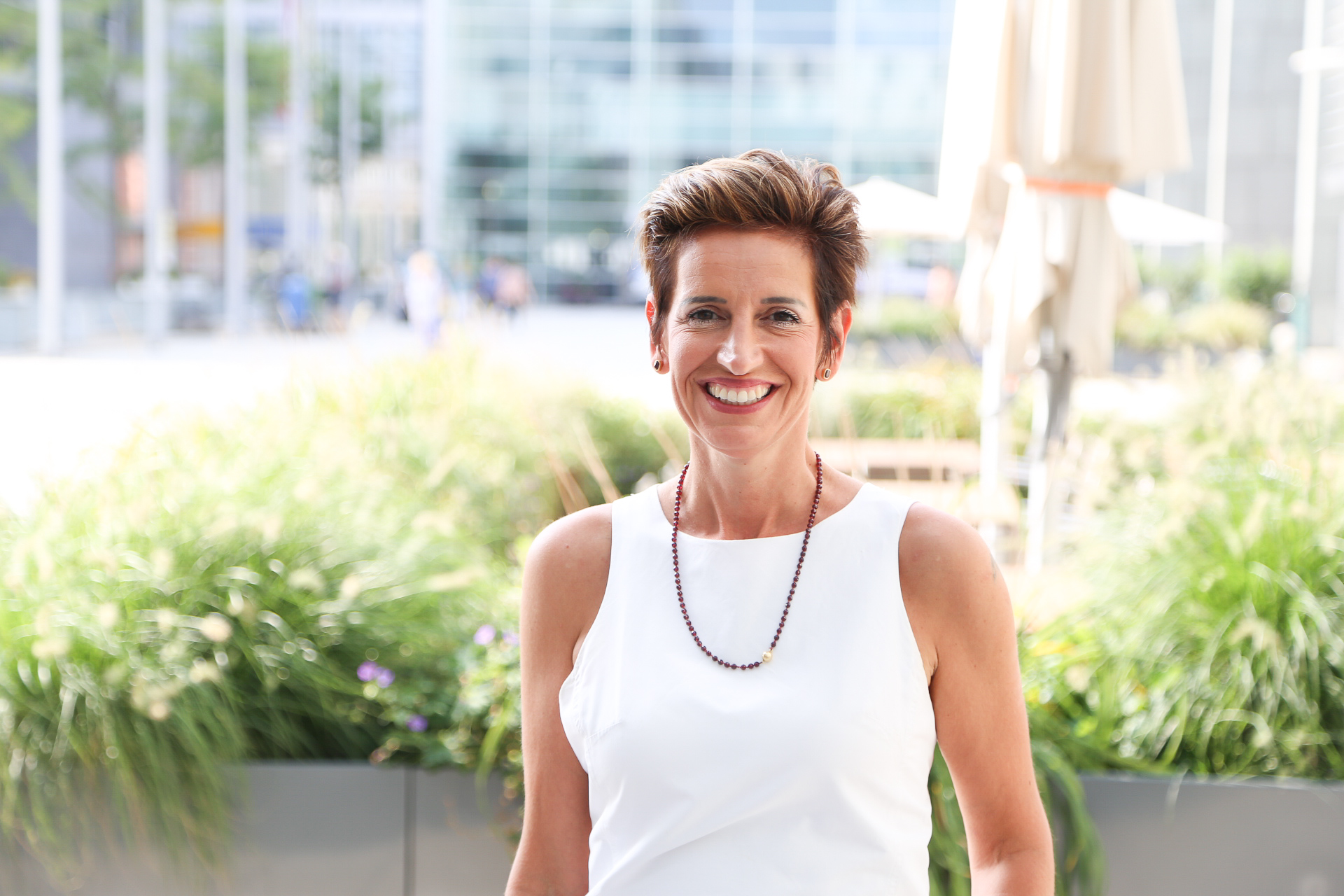
Indra Collini (2019)

Indra Collini (born 6 December 1970 in Dornbirn) is an Austrian business economist and politician (NEOS).

== Life ==
Between 1990 and 1996 Collini studied business administration at the University of Innsbruck (degree: Magistra) and has since held various positions in marketing, including at Gasteiner, Vöslauer and Yuu'n Mee. In 2012 she volunteered for NEOS. A year later she became deputy state spokeswoman for NEOS in Lower Austria and in November 2016 succeeded Nikolaus Scherak as state spokeswoman. She has been a member of the extended board of NEOS Austria since 2016. In May 2017, Indra Collini was elected the top candidate at a general meeting in St. Pölten with 82.6 percent. When NEOS took office for the first time in Lower Austria in the 2018 state elections, it received 5.2 percent of the votes. As a result, she became member of the Landtag of Lower Austria (state parliament) and leader of the NEOS parliamentary group in the Landtag. In the National Council election in 2019, her state party already achieved 7.7 percent, which corresponds to an increase of 2.87 percent compared to the last National Council election in 2017. On 9 November 2019 Collini was re-elected as the lead candidate with 99% of the votes and thus remained in office. Since 14 May 2020 she has been President of the NEOS Lab. Since 14 May 2021 she has been Vice President of the NEOS Association of Municipal Representatives in Lower Austria. In June 2022 she was elected NEOS top candidate for the 2023 state election.

Collini is the mother of two children and lives with them in Brunn am Gebirge.
