= Erwin Waihs =

Erwin Waihs (*August 3, 1880, Vienna; +July 5, 1959, Aich am Attersee) was an Austrian politician.

== Life ==
During the times of the Austro-Hungarian monarchy, Waihs completed a Doctorate in Law and became one of the judges at the Oberlandesgericht in Vienna. After the First World War, he joined the Christian Social Party. From November 1918 to June 1920, he was employed at the Ministry of Defence. From 1920 to 1934, he was a Member of Parlament.

== Austrian Black Cross ==
As an employee of the Ministry of Defence, he founded the Austrian Black Cross, the Austrian War Graves Organisation. From 1919 to 1938, and again from 1945 until his death, he served as President of the organisation.
