= 2013 Lower Austrian state election =

← 2008	3 March 2013	2018 →

All 56 seats in the Landtag of Lower Austria 29 seats needed for a majority All 9 seats in the state government
- Turnout: 975,746 (70.9%) ▼3.6%
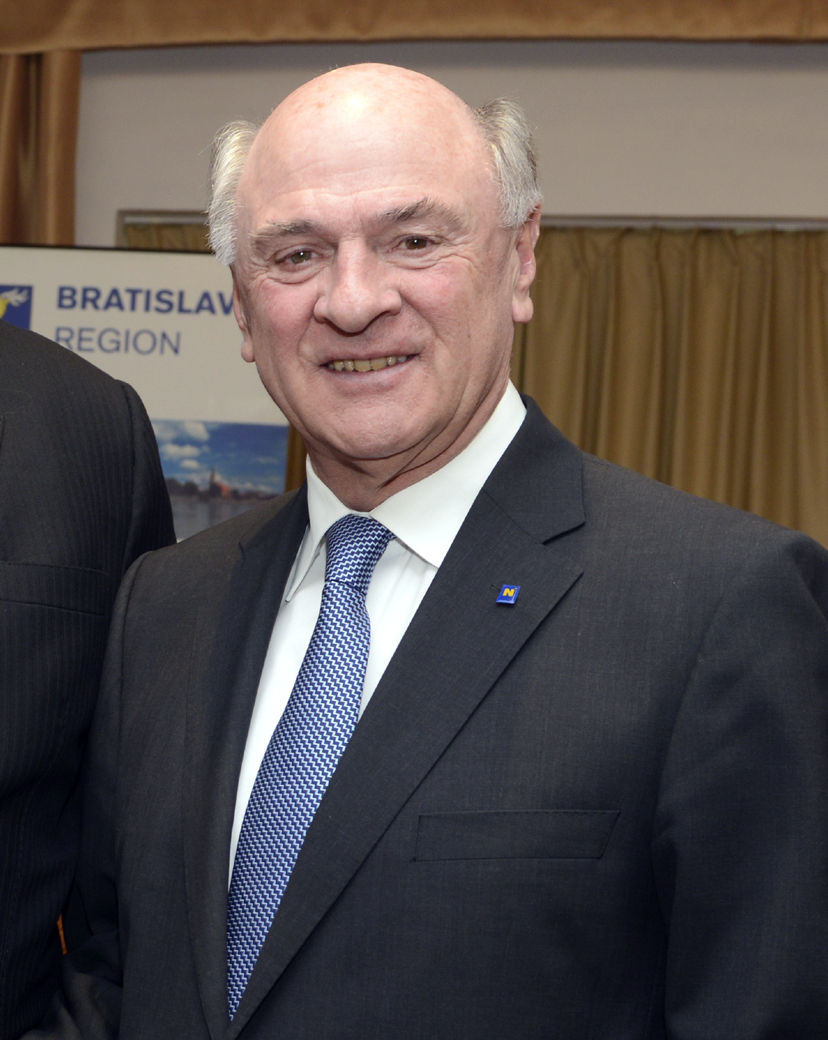

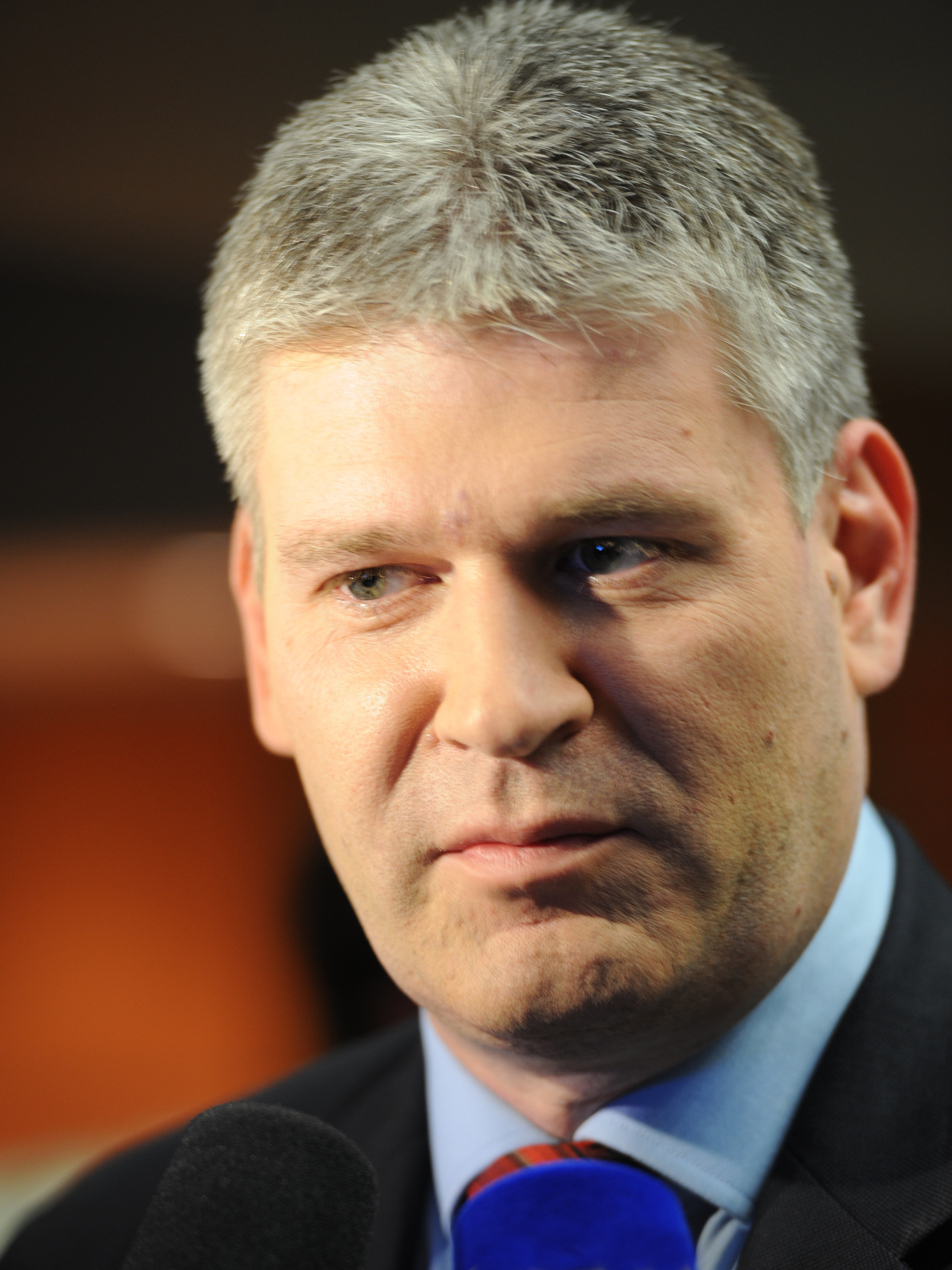

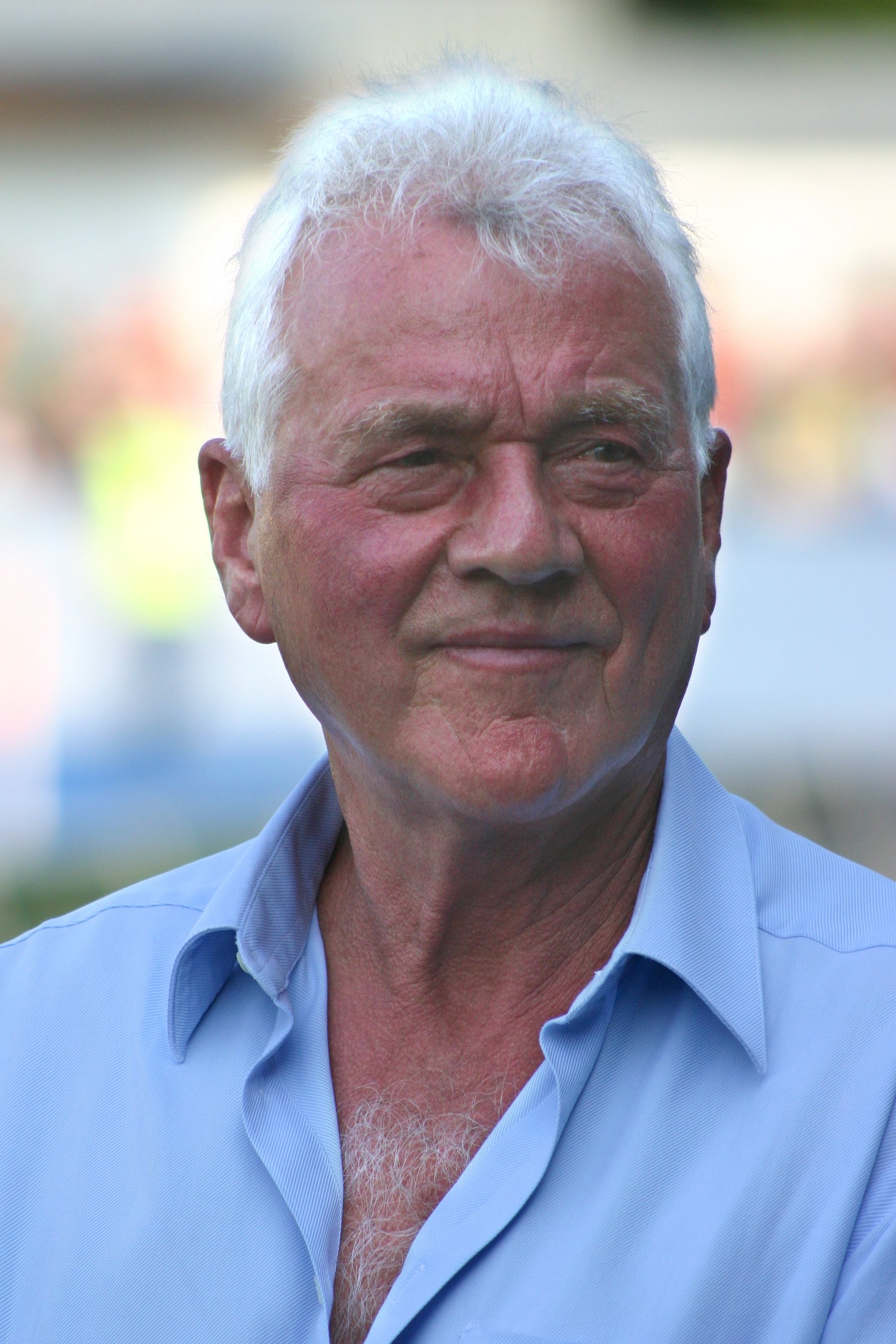

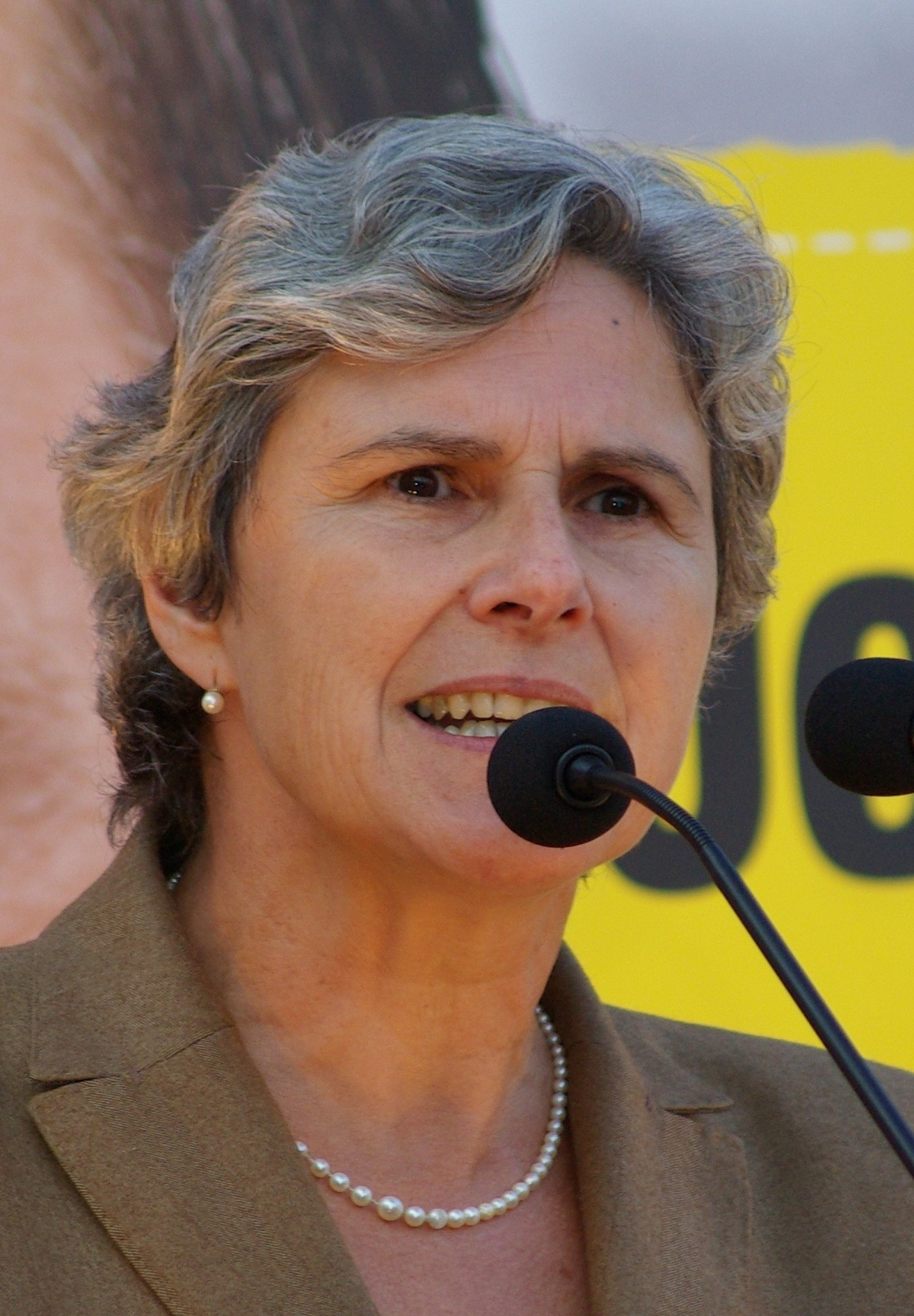

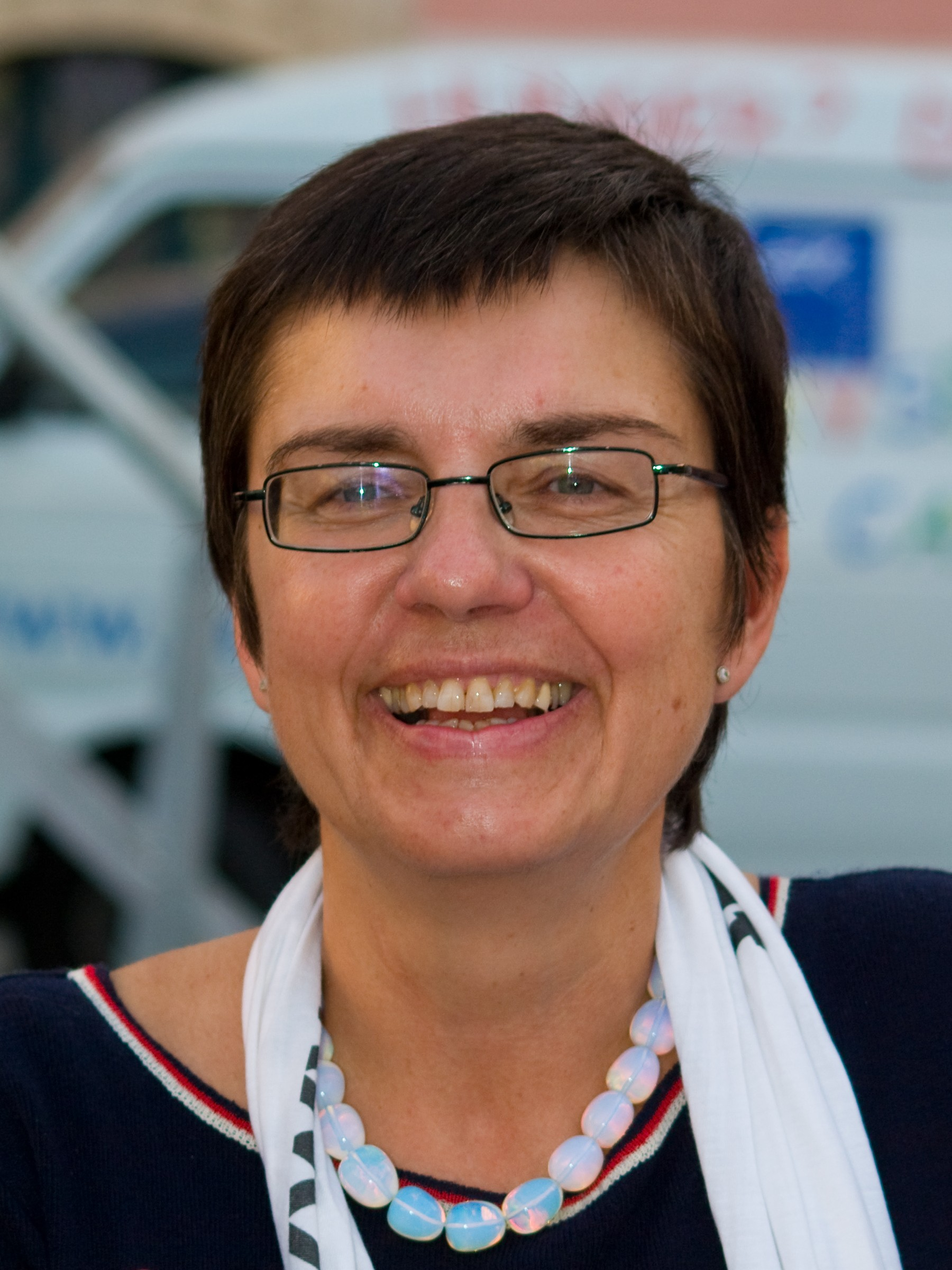
	First party	Second party	Third party
Leader	Erwin Pröll	Josef Leitner	Frank Stronach
Party	ÖVP	SPÖ	Stronach
Last election	31 seats, 54.4%	15 seats, 25.5%	Did not exist
Seats won	30	13	5
Seat change	▼1	▼2	▲5
Popular vote	495,557	210,504	96,016
Percentage	50.8%	21.6%	9.8%
Swing	▼3.6%	▼3.9%	New party
	Fourth party	Fifth party
Leader	Barbara Rosenkranz	Madeleine Petrovic
Party	FPÖ	Greens
Leader since		2008
Last election	6 seats, 10.5%	4 seats, 6.9%
Seats won	4	4
Seat change	▼2	0
Popular vote	80,122	78,678
Percentage	8.2%	8.1%
Swing	▼2.3%	▲1.2%
- Results by municipality.
Governor before election
Erwin Pröll
ÖVP
Elected Governor
Erwin Pröll
ÖVP

The 2013 Lower Austrian state election was held on 3 March 2013 to elect the members of the Landtag of Lower Austria.

The Austrian People's Party (ÖVP) retained its majority. The main winner of the election was the new Team Stronach, which debuted at 9.8%. It drew votes from the ÖVP, Social Democratic Party of Austria (SPÖ) and Freedom Party of Austria (FPÖ).

== Background ==
The Lower Austrian constitution mandates that cabinet positions in the state government (state councillors, German: Landesräten) be allocated between parties proportionally in accordance with the share of votes won by each; this is known as Proporz. As such, the government is a perpetual coalition of all parties that qualify for at least one state councillor. After the 2008 election, the ÖVP had six councillors, the SPÖ two, and the FPÖ one.

== Electoral system ==
The 56 seats of the Landtag of Lower Austria are elected via open list proportional representation in a two-step process. The seats are distributed between twenty multi-member constituencies. For parties to receive any representation in the Landtag, they must either win at least one seat in a constituency directly, or clear a 4 percent state-wide electoral threshold. Seats are distributed in constituencies according to the Hare quota, with any remaining seats allocated using the D'Hondt method at the state level, to ensure overall proportionality between a party's vote share and its share of seats.

== Contesting parties ==
The table below lists parties represented in the previous Landtag.

Name		Ideology	Leader	2008 result		
Name		Ideology	Leader	Votes (%)	Seats	Councillors
ÖVP	Austrian People's Party; Österreichische Volkspartei	Christian democracy	Erwin Pröll	54.4%	31 / 56	6 / 9
SPÖ	Social Democratic Party of Austria; Sozialdemokratische Partei Österreichs	Social democracy	Josef Leitner	25.5%	15 / 56	2 / 9
FPÖ	Freedom Party of Austria; Freiheitliche Partei Österreichs	Right-wing populism Euroscepticism	Barbara Rosenkranz	10.5%	6 / 56	1 / 9
GRÜNE	The Greens – The Green Alternative; Die Grünen – Die Grüne Alternative	Green politics	Madeleine Petrovic	6.9%	4 / 56	

In addition to the parties already represented in the Landtag, five parties collected enough signatures to be placed on the ballot.

- Team Stronach (FRANK)
- Communist Party of Austria (KPÖ) – on the ballot only in 19 constituencies
- The Brave Citizens (MUT) – on the ballot only in 13 constituencies
- Christian Party of Austria – Centre Party (CPÖMP) – on the ballot only in 4 constituencies
- Pirate Party of Austria (PIRAT) – on the ballot only in 1 constituency

== Results ==
Party	Votes	%	+/−	Seats	+/−	Coun.	+/−
Austrian People's Party (ÖVP)	495,557	50.79	–3.60	30	–1	6	±0
Social Democratic Party of Austria (SPÖ)	210,504	21.57	–3.94	13	–2	2	±0
Team Stronach (FRANK)	90,016	9.84	New	5	New	1	New
Freedom Party of Austria (FPÖ)	80,122	8.21	–2.26	4	–2	0	–1
The Greens – The Green Alternative (GRÜNE)	78,678	8.06	+1.15	4	±0	0	±0
Communist Party of Austria (KPÖ)	7,559	0.77	–0.09	0	±0	0	±0
The Brave Citizens (MUT)	5,968	0.61	New	0	New	0	New
Christian Party of Austria – Centre Party (CPÖMP)	841	0.09	–0.75	0	±0	0	±0
Pirate Party of Austria (PIRAT)	501	0.05	+0.05	0	±0	0	±0
Invalid/blank votes	19,527	–	–	–	–	–	–
Total	995,273	100	–	56	0	9	0
Registered voters/turnout	1,404,454	70.87	–3.64	–	–	–	–
Source: Lower Austrian Government

Popular vote
ÖVP	50.79%
SPÖ	21.57%
FRANK	9.84%
FPÖ	8.21%
GRÜNE	8.06%
Other	1.52%

Landtag seats
ÖVP	53.57%
SPÖ	23.21%
FRANK	8.93%
FPÖ	7.14%
GRÜNE	7.14%

=== Results by constituency ===
Constituency	ÖVP		SPÖ		FRANK		FPÖ		Grüne		Others	Total seats	Turnout
Constituency	%	S	%	S	%	S	%	S	%	S	%	Total seats	Turnout
Amstetten	53.5	2	20.2	1	9.0		7.9		7.6		1.8	3	74.6
Baden	42.9	1	22.6	1	14.4		8.9		9.4		1.9	2	67.0
Bruck an der Leitha	50.2		23.7		10.9		8.1		5.7		1.4	0	69.1
Gänserndorf	46.8	1	25.8		10.7		8.9		6.2		1.6	1	67.3
Gmünd	50.5		28.1		9.0		6.7		4.9		0.9	0	75.3
Hollabrunn	58.1	1	20.3		7.9		7.0		5.3		1.4	1	74.5
Horn	64.1		15.6		6.7		7.4		5.8		0.5	0	76.3
Korneuburg	51.1	1	18.1		10.1		8.0		11.0		1.8	1	69.8
Krems an der Donau	56.1	1	19.1		7.8		7.6		7.4		1.9	1	74.5
Lilienfeld	49.1		27.4		8.9		7.7		5.9		1.0	0	76.3
Melk	51.8	1	22.6		8.1		9.3		6.3		1.8	1	76.6
Mistelbach	57.3	2	19.1		8.4		7.8		6.8		0.7	2	74.0
Mödling	45.3	2	18.6		11.9		7.2		14.8		2.2	2	65.7
Neunkirchen	48.0	1	26.0		9.6		8.6		6.3		1.6	1	70.5
Sankt Pölten	47.4	2	24.3	1	9.5		8.6		8.4		1.9	3	71.7
Scheibbs	55.8	1	21.6		7.4		7.3		5.5		2.4	1	77.0
Tulln	53.8	1	18.4		9.6		8.1		9.3		0.8	1	71.7
Waidhofen an der Thaya	56.8		18.6		8.1		10.6		5.9			0	74.7
Vienna Surrounds	43.4	1	21.9		11.9		8.5		13.0		1.3	1	62.1
Zwettl	64.7	1	13.7		7.3		8.5		5.4		0.5	1	78.3
Remaining seats		11		10		5		4		4		34	
Total	50.8	30	21.6	13	9.8	5	8.2	4	8.1	4	1.5	56	70.9
Source: Lower Austrian Government

=== Preference votes ===
Alongside votes for a party, voters were able to cast a preferential votes for a candidate on the party list. The ten candidates with the most preferential votes were as follows:

Party	Pos.	Candidate	Votes	%
ÖVP	1	Erwin Pröll	267,482	88.4
SPÖ	1	Josef Leitner	39,706	61.0
FRANK	1	Frank Stronach	29,728	83.5
FPÖ	1	Barbara Rosenkranz	29,099	81.2
GRÜNE	1	Madeleine Petrovic	19,690	67.8
ÖVP	4	Stefan Pernkopf	5,635	1.9
ÖVP	6	Karl Wilfing	4,579	1.5
ÖVP	25	Bettina Rausch	3,118	1.0
SPÖ	4	Heidamaria Onodi	2,747	4.2
FRANK	2	Ernest Gabmann Jr.	2,778	7.8

== Aftermath ==
The ÖVP retained its Landtag majority and six out of nine state councillors; the SPÖ also retained its two councillors. The FPÖ lost their sole state councillor to Team Stronach.
