= Ebreichsdorf =

Ebreichsdorf Ebreichsduaf
- Municipality
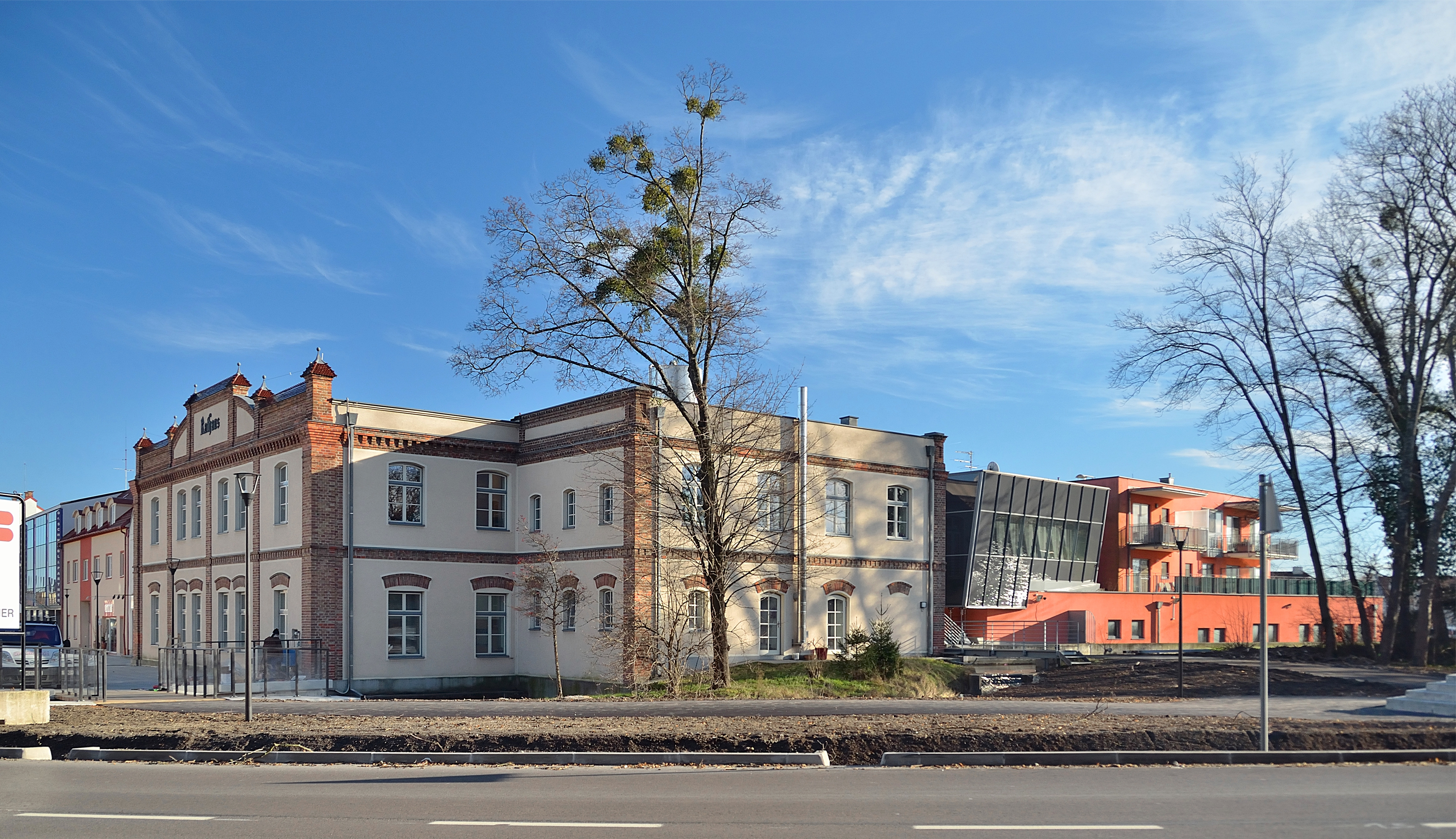
- Town hall

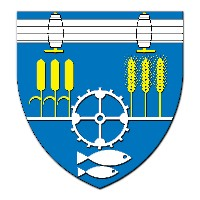
- Coat of arms

- Location within Austria
- Coordinates: 47°58′N 16°24′E
- Country: Austria
- State: Lower Austria
- District: Baden

Government
  - Mayor: Wolfgang Kocevar (SPÖ)

Area
  - Total: 43.2 km^{2} (16.7 sq mi)
- Elevation: 202 m (663 ft)

Population (2018-01-01)
  - Total: 10,942
  - Density: 253/km^{2} (656/sq mi)
- Time zone: UTC+1 (CET)
  - Summer (DST): UTC+2 (CEST)
- Postal code: 2483
- Area code: 02254
- Website: www.ebreichsdorf.at

Ebreichsdorf (Central Bavarian: Ebreichsduaf) is a town in the district of Baden in Lower Austria in Austria.

== Population ==
Historical population
Year	Pop.	±%
1869	3,099	—
1880	3,940	+27.1%
1890	4,371	+10.9%
1900	4,466	+2.2%
1910	4,659	+4.3%
1923	4,761	+2.2%
1934	4,847	+1.8%
1939	4,651	−4.0%
1951	4,564	−1.9%
1961	4,690	+2.8%
1971	5,460	+16.4%
1981	5,607	+2.7%
1991	7,353	+31.1%
2001	8,786	+19.5%
2011	9,769	+11.2%

== Mayors ==
The mayor is since 2010 Wolfgang Kocevar (SPÖ), the predecessor was Josef Pilz (Bürgerliste (Citizens list)).

== Personalities ==
- Andreas Graf (born 1985), track and road cyclist
- Ida Krottendorf (1927-1998), actress
- Ulla Weigerstorfer (born 1967), Miss World and deputy to the National Council
