= Udo Landbauer =

Austrian politician (born 1986)

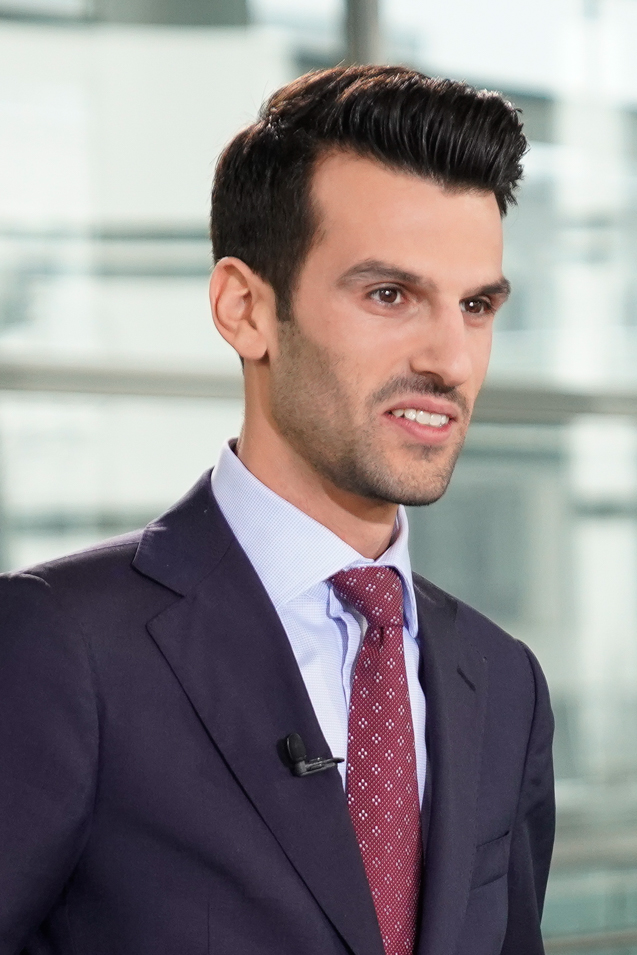

Deputy Governor of Lower Austria
- Incumbent
- Assumed office 23 March 2023
- Preceded by: Stephan Pernkopf

Personal details
- Born: 12 April 1986 (age 40) Neunkirchen, Austria
- Party: FPÖ
- Children: 1

Udo Landbauer (born 12 April 1986 in Neunkirchen, Austria) is an Austrian far-right politician from the FPÖ. From 2011 to 2018 he was head of the FPÖ Youth Ring, from 2010 to 2018 Landbauer was a municipal politician in Wiener Neustadt and from 2013 to 2018 he was a member of the provincial parliament (Landtag) of Lower Austria. He was the leading candidate of the FPÖ in the 2018 Lower Austrian provincial parliament elections. As a result of the affair surrounding the Germania zu Wiener Neustadt fraternity, he resigned from all political functions on 1 February 2018 and suspended his FPÖ party membership. On 20. September he returned as member of the Freedom Party of Austria to the Lower Austrian provincial parliament. On the same day he was elected as the head of the FPÖ of Lower Austria.

== Biography ==
Udo Landbauer was born as the son of an Austrian father and an Iranian mother. His father and brother are also active in the FPÖ.

He attended grammar school at the Theresian Military Academy in Wiener Neustadt and graduated in 2005. He then completed his military service in Mautern an der Donau, Neusiedl am See and Wiener Neustadt. From 2001 to 2010 he worked seasonally as a ski instructor at a ski school on the Semmering. From 2006 to 2010 he studied law at the University of Vienna. Since 2012 he studies at the Johannes Kepler University in Linz.

== Political career ==
Landbauer joined the Lower Austrian Ring Freiheitlicher Jugend (RFJ) at the age of 14, and became a member of its regional board in 2003. From 2005 - in the same year he became a member of the regional party executive committee of the Lower Austrian FPÖ division - until 2010 he was head farmer of the Lower Austrian RFJ and in 2010 he was appointed honorary chairman. From 2006 until his election as Executive Federal Chairman in 2011, he was Secretary General of RFJ Austria. On the 25th ordinary Federal Youth Day of the RFJ Austria in Tulln an der Donau in March 2012, he was elected Federal Chairman with 98.7% of the delegate votes, thus also confirming his position as member of the FPÖ federal party executive committee, and after the three-year period of office on 9 May 2015 during the 26th ordinary Federal Youth Day. Maximilian Krauss succeeded him as RFJ Chairman in January 2018. From 2009 he was also district party chairman of the FPÖ Wiener Neustadt.

In 2010 Landbauer supported the organisation "Junge Patrioten - Verein zur Erziehung zu politischer Verantwortung", an extreme right-wing group with "folk-fundamentalist orientation". In two letters to sympathizers of the "Junge Patrioten", Landbauer campaigned for donations, including a songbook for on the road published by the Group in 2010, which included, among other things, a Christmas song propagated during the Nazi era.

Landbauer received his first political mandate as a FPÖ candidate after the municipal council elections in Wiener Neustadt on 14 March 2010 with the position in the department of transport and foundations in the city council. From 2011 to 2014 he worked in the "Klub der Wiener Freiheitlichen Landtagsabgeordneten und Gemeinderäte" as a political adviser to the Klubobmannes. After the provincial elections in Lower Austria in 2013, he became a member of the FPÖ in the Landtag of Lower Austria and moved from the city council in Wiener Neustadt to the municipal council. In 2016, after the resignation of Markus Dock-Schnedlitz, he rejoined the city council.
