= Austrian Black Cross =

Logo of the Austrian Black Cross

The Austrian Black Cross is an Austrian organization which is active in war graves care.

== Activities ==
The Austrian Black Cross was founded in 1919 by state secretary Erwin Waihs. Ever since then its activities concern the maintenance and construction of grave sites for victims of war, both civilians, refugees and soldiers regardless of their national identity. In total, the Austrian Black Cross maintains 241,000 graves.

Another activity is to identify mass graves and help exhume, identify and rebury the dead in their home countries.

The financial needs of the Austrian Black Cross are fully covered by donors. Popular amongst Austrians are the so-called "Allerheiligen-Sammlungen", where soldiers and others will voluntarily collect donations at cemeteries on the 1st of November.

== Decorations ==
The Austrian Black Cross awards a range of decorations, medals and pins.

== Weblinks ==
www.osk.at - official website

== Literature ==
- Andreas Reiter (ed.): Österreichisches Schwarzes Kreuz. Kriegsgräberfürsorge. Dokumentation. Vienna 1987, OBV.
- Thomas Reichl: Das Kriegsgräberwesen Österreich-Ungarns im Weltkrieg und die Obsorge in der Republik Österreich. Das Wirken des Österreichischen Schwarzen Kreuzes in der Zwischenkriegszeit. Dissertation. University of Vienna, Vienna 2007. online.
- Christina Springer: Das Österreichische Schwarze Kreuz – seine Tätigkeit und sein Wirkungsbereich nach 1945. Thesis. University of Vienna, Vienna 2010. online.
