= Johanna Mikl-Leitner =

Austrian politician (born 1964)

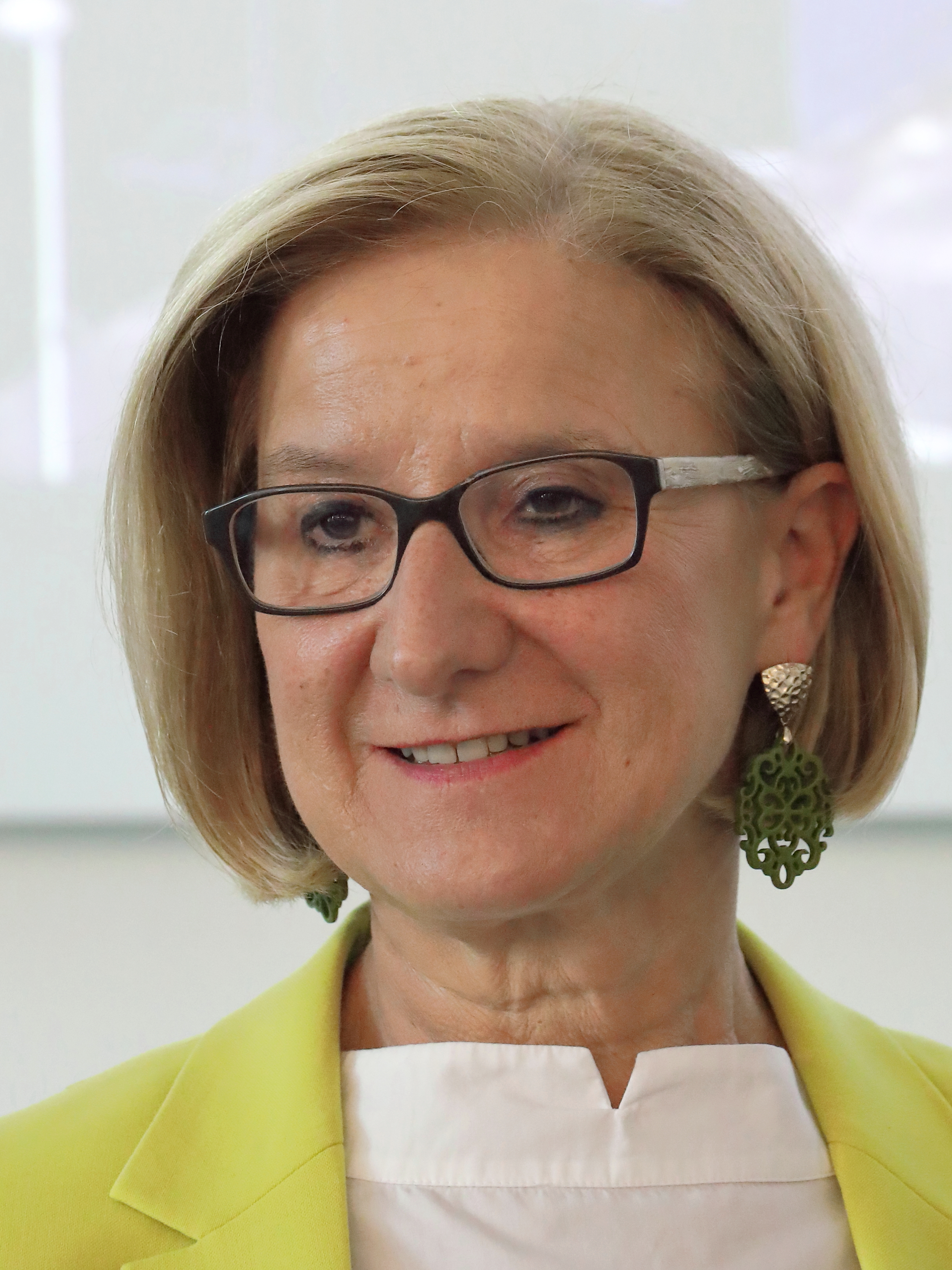

Governor of Lower Austria
- Incumbent
- Assumed office 19 April 2017
- Deputy: Udo Landbauer (FPÖ); Stephan Pernkopf (SPÖ)
- Preceded by: Erwin Pröll

Deputy Governor of Lower Austria
- In office 21 April 2016 – 19 April 2017
- Governor: Erwin Pröll
- Preceded by: Wolfgang Sobotka
- Succeeded by: Stephan Pernkopf

Councilor for Finances of Lower Austria
- In office 21 April 2016 – 19 April 2017
- Governor: Erwin Pröll
- Preceded by: Wolfgang Sobotka
- Succeeded by: Ludwig Schleritzko

Minister of the Interior
- In office 21 April 2011 – 21 April 2016
- Chancellor: Werner Faymann
- Preceded by: Maria Fekter
- Succeeded by: Wolfgang Sobotka

Councilor for Labour, Social Affairs and Families of Lower Austria
- In office 25 April 2003 – 21 April 2011
- Preceded by: Franz Blochberger
- Succeeded by: Barbara Schwarz

Personal details
- Born: Johanna Leitner; 9 February 1964 (age 62) Hollabrunn, Austria
- Party: People's Party
- Children: 2
- Education: Vienna University of Economics and Business

Johanna Mikl-Leitner (née Leitner; born 9 February 1964) is an Austrian politician of the Austrian People's Party (ÖVP) and since 2017 the governor of Lower Austria.

== Early life and education ==
Johanna Leitner was born in Hollabrunn, Lower Austria. She grew up in Großharras, where she attended primary school from 1970 till 1974. She went to a grammar school which specializes in natural sciences (Realgymnasium) in Laa an der Thaya. In 1978, she switched to business school (Handelsakademie) in Laa, where she took her A-levels (Matura) in 1983. Mikl-Leitner studied Business Education at the Vienna University of Economics and Business and graduated with a Master of Social and Economic Sciences degree.

== Career ==
Mikl-Leitner taught at the business school (Handelsakademie) in Laa an der Thaya, where she had previously studied, from 1989 until 1990. Subsequently, she became a trainee with the Federation of Austrian Industries until 1993 and then worked for a publishing company until 1995. At that point she made her first steps into politics. She became the marketing manager for the Lower Austrian ÖVP in 1995 and their leader in 1998.

== Politics ==
Johanna Mikl-Leitner was a member of Austria's national council from 29 October 1999 until 18 April 2003, representing the ÖVP. On 24 March 2003, she became a member of the provincial government (Landesrätin) of Lower Austria.

In 2010, she was elected vice president of the Assembly of European Regions. After the resignation of vice chancellor and ÖVP party leader Josef Pröll, the Faymann cabinet was reshuffled and Johanna Mikl-Leitner was sworn in as Austria's minister of the interior on 21 April 2011.

== Personal life ==
Johanna Mikl-Leitner is married and has two daughters. She lives in Klosterneuburg, Lower Austria.

Political offices
Preceded by Maria Fekter	Minister of the Interior; 2011–2016	Succeeded by Wolfgang Sobotka
