= Landtag of Lower Austria =

Lower Austrian regional parliament

State Diet of Lower Austria Landtag von Niederösterreich

Type
- Type: Landtag

History
- Founded: 1861; 1920

Leadership
- President of the Landtag: Karl Wilfing, ÖVP

Structure
- Seats: 56
- Political groups: Government (37): ÖVP (23); FPÖ (14); Opposition (19): SPÖ (12); GRÜNE (4); NEOS (3)
- Length of term: 5 years

Elections
- Last election: 29 January 2023
- Next election: 2028

Meeting place
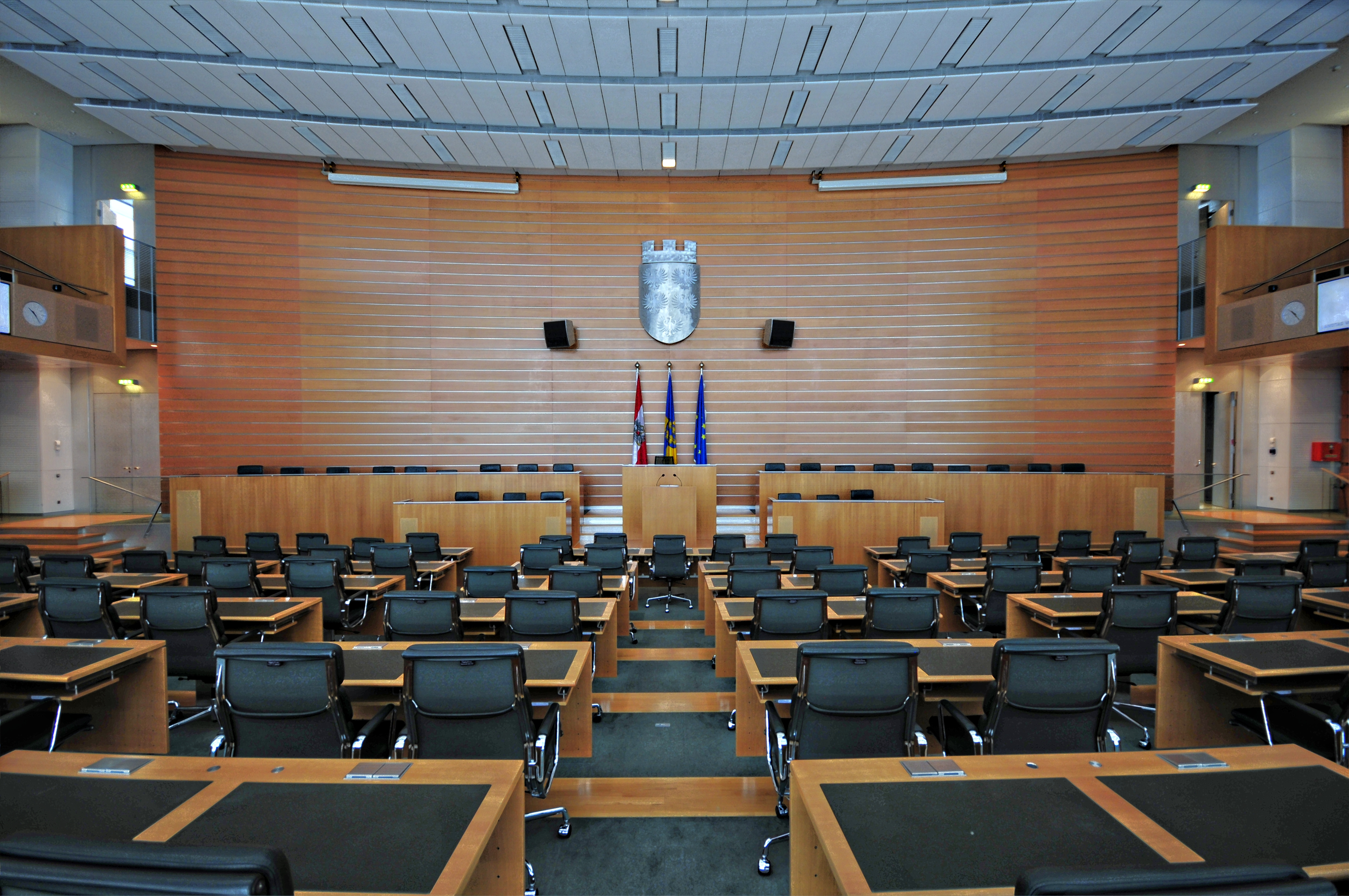
- St. Pölten, Lower Austria

Website
- noe-landtag.gv.at

The Landtag of Lower Austria is the state parliament of the Austrian state of Lower Austria. It exercises the state legislation (legislature). The seat of the Landtag is in St. Pölten in the Landhausviertel.

The Lower Austrian Parliament is composed of 56 members of parliament. The term of office is five years. Elections are held in accordance with the Lower Austrian Landtag election regulations of 1992. 21 constituencies in Lower Austria correspond to the political districts. The statutory cities belong to the district of the same name or the surrounding district. The number of deputies corresponds to the number of inhabitants.

To be eligible to stand as a candidate, a candidate must be 18 years of age (on election day) and have at least 50 declarations of consent. They are nominated by a political party. In order to enter the state parliament, one party must reach the four percent hurdle or obtain a mandate in a constituency.

The most recent elections to the Landtag of Lower Austria were held on 28 January 2018.

== History ==
The Lower Austrian parliament dates back to the medieval meetings of the estates, the so-called Landtaidinge. These were the prelates (ecclesiastical nobility), the lords (high secular nobility), the knighthood (low secular nobility) and the status of the princely towns and markets. In other words, the peasantry in particular, i.e. the majority of the population, were not represented. In 1513, a building was purchased in what is now Herrengasse in Vienna, the so-called Palais Niederösterreich, where the state parliament met until 1997.

The great power of the estates in the 16th century was pushed back more and more in the age of absolutism, but the state parliament was never abolished. Its last meeting in its old form took place on 13 March 1848 - the presentation of a petition to the Lower Austrian estates regarding riots was the trigger for the March Revolution.

The constitutions and draft constitutions of the following years regularly provided for a state parliament for Lower Austria, but it only became reality in 1861 with the February Patent. According to the "Landes-Ordnung für das Erzherzogthum Oesterreich unter der Enns", which was issued by this patent and was valid until 1918, the Landtag should consist of 66 members, namely: the Archbishop of Vienna, the Bishop of St. Pölten, the Rector of the University of Vienna, furthermore 15 members of the Großgrundbesitz, 28 members of the towns and markets as well as of the chambers of commerce and trade and twenty members of the rural communities.

As a result of this curia system, the right to vote was extremely unequal and, moreover, limited to about 7% of the population due to a census voting law in place for towns and rural communities, i.e. eligibility to vote was subject to a certain tax payment by the voter. A remarkable step backwards was taken in 1888 with the explicit abolition of the previously upright right to vote for women.

On 20 March 1919, a new electoral law was enacted which introduced universal, equal, direct and secret suffrage for all citizens residing in Lower Austria without distinction of sex. For Vienna, which at that time still belonged to Lower Austria, 68 of the 120 mandates were planned. The first election after this right to vote took place on 4 May 1919 and brought an absolute majority for the Social Democratic Workers Party.

In 1919-1920, tendencies, some of which had already been expressed in the monarchy, to separate Vienna from Lower Austria became stronger. In the monarchy, Vienna was considered to be an imperial city, with the k.k. Government for Cisleithania, it was now a question of making Vienna a federal province. To the other six provinces, which existed at that time, one province of Lower Austria including Vienna seemed to be too powerful a partner in the desired federalism, since about half of all Austrians lived in this province. Moreover, Lower Austrian farmers did not want to be governed by the social democratic Viennese, and the social democratic Viennese did not want to be hindered in left-wing politics by conservative Lower Austrians.

For this reason, the separation of Vienna and Lower Austria was agreed in the Grand Coalition and adopted by the Constituent National Assembly on 1 October 1920. On the day the Federal Constitutional Law came into force, on 10 November 1920, the Gemeinderat of Vienna met for the first time as the Landtag of Vienna and adopted the Vienna City Constitution, which came into force on 18 November 1920. The new Lower Austria without Vienna adopted the Constitution of the Land of Lower Austria on 30 November 1920.

In order to coordinate the division of the previous state property, the joint Lower Austrian parliament, if necessary divided into the two curia Vienna and Lower Austria Land, was formally preserved until the end of 1921, but had almost nothing more to decide, since the leading politicians of the two new Landtags did not want to maintain the commonality in part legally either. The abolition of the remaining commonalities was decided in Vienna and Lower Austria by their new legislative bodies at the end of 1921.

From 1 January 1922, the two new Landtags were legally completely separated. However, it had been agreed that the seat of the Lower Austrian parliament and the Lower Austrian government would remain in the Landhaus in Vienna; Vienna's half share in the building would only be beaten if the Landtag moved out of the Landhaus.

By 1932, the state parliament had 60 members elected in four constituencies. In 1932 the electoral law was reformed and the number of members reduced to 56, while the number of constituencies was increased to eight to make it more difficult for smaller parties, especially the NSDAP, to move in.

In 1933, the Dollfuss government took out the National Council, but the Christian Social Party and the Social Democratic Workers Party (SDAP) jointly passed the prohibition law for the NSDAP in the Lower Austrian Landtag. On February 12, 1934, the Dollfuss dictatorship banned Austrian social democracy, thus depriving the Lower Austrian parliament of its democratic basis. On 1 July 1934, the Landtag was dictatorially transformed into a Parliament of Estates, consisting of 36 mandataries sent in by the professions.

With the Anschluss in 1938, the state parliament was dissolved. The administration of the Reichsgau Niederdonau was headed by a Gauleiter appointed by Adolf Hitler.

After the end of the Second World War, state laws were passed by the provisional state government from April 27, 1945; and on December 12, the state parliament was reconstituted and on the same day elected the Reither government as the first elected government of the Second Republic.

As a result of the vote on its own state capital, the Landtag moved to St. Pölten on 21 May 1997. Subsequently, the building in Vienna, which for centuries had been known as a Landhaus, was renamed to Palais Niederösterreich to facilitate the use of the building for non-political purposes.
