= Opinion polling for the 2016 Austrian presidential election =

This page lists public opinion polls in connection with the 2016 Austrian presidential election.

== First round ==
Publication date	Poll source	Sample size							Others/ Undecided
Publication date	Poll source	Sample size	Hundstorfer SPÖ	Khol ÖVP	Hofer FPÖ	Van der Bellen Greens	Griss Ind.	Lugner Ind.	Others/ Undecided
2016
24 Apr	Election	—	11.28	11.12	35.05	21.34	18.94	2.26	—
20 Apr	MindTake Research/Servus TV	504	7.7	7.2	35.6	26.9	18.3	4.3	—
19 Apr	meinungsraum.at	600	14	9	22	26	24	5	—
18 Apr	OGM/Kurier	889	15	11	24	25	22	3	—
13 Apr	Gallup/ÖSTERREICH	400	16	11	24	26	20	3	—
8 Apr	Hajek/ATV	700	14	12	24	27	19	4	—
8 Apr	OGM/Bundesländerzeitungen	1,013	17	13	22	24	21	2	—
7 Apr	Unique Research/Heute	800	14	12	23	29	18	4	—
6 Apr	Gallup/ÖSTERREICH	400	14	12	23	26	21	4	—
24 Mar	Spectra/ORF	1,000	14	13	21	29	19	4	—
24 Mar	SORA/ORF	1,000	14	12	21	30	20	3	—
24 Mar	Gallup/ÖSTERREICH	400	17	13	21	25	19	5	—
Polls conducted ahead of the release of the official list of candidates
24 Mar	IMAS/Kronen Zeitung	1,017	21	15	21	19	13	7	4
23 Mar	OGM/Team Griss	1,019	19	10	22	26	20	—	3
10 Mar	Gallup/ÖSTERREICH	400	16	16	19	26	19	4	—
27 Feb	GfK/Salzburger Nachrichten	1,800	19–20	19–20	16–17	24–25	18–19	—	2
25 Feb	Gallup/ÖSTERREICH	400	16	14	19	27	19	5	—
5 Feb	Hajek/ATV	700	15	17	20	29	18	—	—
5 Feb	Hajek/ATV	700	15	17	18	29	17	3	—
4 Feb	Gallup/ÖSTERREICH	400	17	13	19	28	22	—	—
4 Feb	Gallup/ÖSTERREICH	400	17	13	18	27	19	7	—
30 Jan	OGM/Kurier	504	23	14	17	26	20	—	—
28 Jan	Gallup/ÖSTERREICH	400	17	15	8	33	27	—	—

Hypothetical polls with candidates who did not run

Publication date	Poll source	Sample size												Others/ Undecided
Publication date	Poll source	Sample size	Hundstorfer SPÖ	Bures SPÖ	Khol ÖVP	Pröll ÖVP	Leitl ÖVP	Hofer FPÖ	Moser FPÖ	Strache FPÖ	Van der Bellen Greens	Griss Ind.	Lugner Ind.	Others/ Undecided
2016
22 Jan	Unique Research/Heute	500	15	—	13	—	—	—	—	18	32	21	—	1
22 Jan	Unique Research/Heute	500	16	—	16	—	—	13			31	22	—	2
17 Jan	meinungsraum.at/ORF Im Zentrum	500	16	—	19	—	—	—	4	—	33	28	—	—
14 Jan	Gallup/ÖSTERREICH	400	16	—	19	—	—	—	3	—	31	31	—	—
14 Jan	Gallup/ÖSTERREICH	400	13	—	16	—	—	—	—	21	25	20	5	—
2015
22 Dec	M&R-Institut/NÖN	1,000	32.6	—	—	43.0	—	—	—	—	—	—	—	24.4
22 Dec	M&R-Institut/NÖN	1,000	—	—	—	46.4	—	—	—	—	34.5	—	—	19.1
22 Dec	M&R-Institut/NÖN	1,000	—	—	—	40.1	—	—	—	—	—	35.0	—	24.9
19 Dec	Gallup/ÖSTERREICH	400	12	—	—	19	—	—	9	—	29	31	—	—
29 Nov	Gallup/ÖSTERREICH	400	23	—	—	31	—	10	—	—	36	—	—	—
29 Nov	Gallup/ÖSTERREICH	400	—	21	—	—	27	11	—	—	41	—	—	—
25 Oct	Gallup/ÖSTERREICH	400	—	20	—	—	29	9	—	—	39	—	—	3
25 Aug	Gallup/ÖSTERREICH	400	18	—	—	26	—	13	—	—	41	—	—	2
2014
20 Jul	Gallup/ÖSTERREICH	400	25	—	—	36	—	10	—	—	29	—	—	—

Regional polling

Publication date	Poll source	Sample size	Region							Others/ Undecided
Publication date	Poll source	Sample size	Region	Hundstorfer SPÖ	Khol ÖVP	Hofer FPÖ	Van der Bellen Greens	Griss Ind.	Lugner Ind.	Others/ Undecided
2016
11 Apr	Edwin Berndt/Vorarlberger Nachrichten	unknown	Vorarlberg	14	25	20	18	20	3	—

== Second round ==
Publication date	Poll source	Sample size			Undecided / Not voting
Publication date	Poll source	Sample size	Hofer FPÖ	Van der Bellen Greens	Undecided / Not voting
22 May	Election	—	49.65	50.35	—
12 May	Gallup/Österreich	600	53	47	—
11 May	MindTake Research/Servus TV	505	52.3	47.7	—
28 Apr	Gallup/Österreich	400	50	50	—
Polls conducted ahead of first round (2016)
24 Apr	Hajek/ATV	unknown	40	43	—
6 Apr	Gallup/ÖSTERREICH (run-off polls)	400	48	52	—
10 Mar	Gallup/ÖSTERREICH	400	45	55	—
25 Feb	Gallup/ÖSTERREICH	400	42	58	—
5 Feb	Hajek/ATV (run-off polls)	700	27	39	—

Hypothetical polls with candidates who did not advance to the second round

Publication date	Poll source	Sample size						
Publication date	Poll source	Sample size	Hundstorfer SPÖ	Khol ÖVP	Hofer FPÖ	Van der Bellen Greens	Griss Ind.	Lugner Ind.
6 Apr	Gallup/ÖSTERREICH (run-off polls)	400	—	—	49	—	51	—
6 Apr	Gallup/ÖSTERREICH (run-off polls)	400	—	—	—	49	51	—
23 Mar	OGM/Team Griss	1,019	30	—	—	—	48	—
23 Mar	OGM/Team Griss	1,019	—	20	—	—	52	—
23 Mar	OGM/Team Griss	1,019	—	—	26	—	52	—
23 Mar	OGM/Team Griss	1,019	—	—	—	33	45	—
25 Feb	Gallup/ÖSTERREICH	400	—	—	—	56	44	—
5 Feb	Hajek/ATV Archived 2016-03-18 at the Wayback Machine (run-off polls)	700	34	29	—	—	—	—
5 Feb	Hajek/ATV Archived 2016-03-18 at the Wayback Machine (run-off polls)	700	28	—	—	34	—	—
5 Feb	Hajek/ATV Archived 2016-03-18 at the Wayback Machine (run-off polls)	700	32	—	—	—	34	—
5 Feb	Hajek/ATV Archived 2016-03-18 at the Wayback Machine (run-off polls)	700	—	30	—	37	—	—
5 Feb	Hajek/ATV Archived 2016-03-18 at the Wayback Machine (run-off polls)	700	—	—	—	32	32	—

== Second round re-vote ==
Publication date	Poll source	Sample size			Undecided / Not voting
Publication date	Poll source	Sample size	Hofer (FPÖ)	Van der Bellen (Greens)	Undecided / Not voting
4 December	Election	—	46.21	53.79	—
17 November	Unique Research/Heute/ATV	957	49	51	—
16 November	Gallup/Österreich	800	52	48	—
11 November	SORA	—	51	49	—
4 November	Gallup/Österreich	800	51	49	—
3 November	Akonsult/Regionalmedien Austria	607	52	48	—
31 October	meinungsraum.at	594	50	50	—
22 October	Gallup/Österreich	800	51	49	—
6 October	Gallup/Österreich	800	50	50	—
24 September	Gallup/Österreich	800	51	49	—
15 September	Gallup/Österreich	800	51	49	—
8 September	Unique Research/Heute	800	49	51	—
8 September	Gallup/Österreich	600	52	48	—
2 September	Hajek/ATV	700	49	51	—
24 August	Gallup/Österreich	600	53	47	—
11 August	Gallup/Österreich	600	52	48	—
28 July	Gallup/Österreich	600	52	48	—
6 July	Gallup/Österreich	600	51	49	—
6 July	meinungsraum.at	600	37	37	26
27 June	Gallup/Österreich	600	49.4	50.6	—
10 June	Gallup/Österreich	600	49.4	50.6	—
