= Opinion polling for the 2017 Austrian legislative election =

In the run up to the 2017 Austrian legislative election, various organisations carried out opinion polling to gauge voting intention in Austria. Results of such polls are displayed in this article.

The date range for these opinion polls are from the previous legislative election, held on 29 September 2013, until the legislative election on 15 October 2017.

== Graphical summary ==
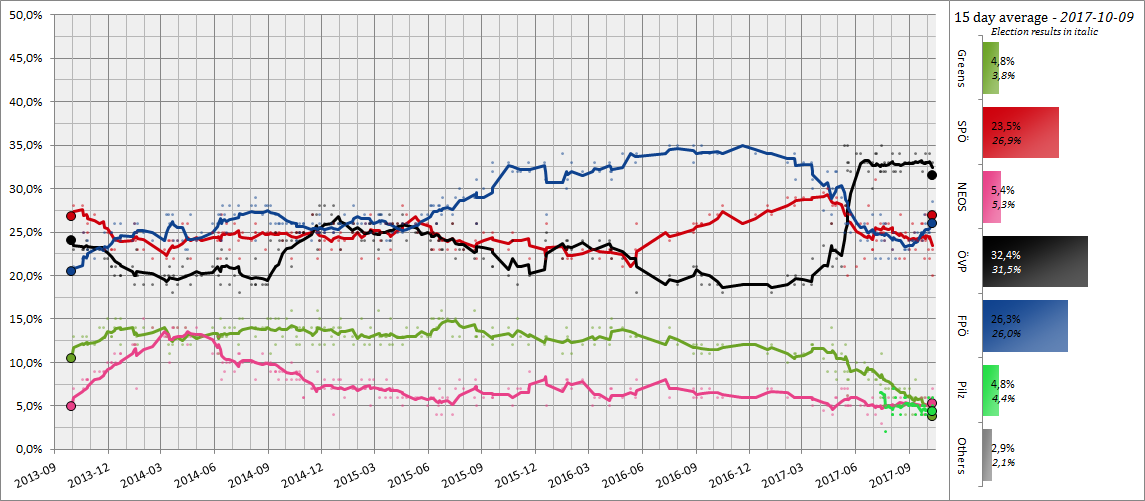

== Poll results ==
Poll results are listed in the tables below in reverse chronological order, showing the most recent first, and using the date the survey's fieldwork was done, as opposed to the date of publication. If that date is unknown, the date of publication is given instead. The highest percentage figure in each polling survey is displayed in bold, and the background shaded in the leading party's colour. In the instance that there is a tie, then all applicable figures are shaded. The lead column on the right shows the percentage-point difference between the two parties with the highest figures.

=== 2017 ===
Polling firm	End date	SPÖ	ÖVP	FPÖ	Grüne	NEOS	PILZ	G!LT	Others	Lead
2017 legislative election results	2017-10-15	26.9	**31.5**	26.0	3.8	5.3	4.4	1.0	1.1	4.6
meinungsraum.at/GMX	2017-10-09	17–23	23–30	**25–32**	3–6	5–9	4–8	–	5–9	2
Research Affairs/Österreich	2017-10-09	23	**33**	27	5	6	5	–	2	6
OGM/Kurier	2017-10-05	27	**33**	25	4	5	4	–	2	6
Research Affairs/Österreich	2017-10-04	22	**34**	27	5	6	4	–	2	7
Market/Standard	2017-10-03	23	**33**	25	5	5	6	–	3	8
Unique Research/Heute & ATV	2017-09-28	27	**34**	25	4	4	4	1	1	7
Research Affairs/Österreich	2017-09-27	24	**33**	26	5	6	4	–	2	7
Spectra/OÖN	2017-09-26	22	**33**	27	6	4	5	–	3	6
Matzka/NEWS	2017-09-22	26	**32**	25	4	5	5	–	3	6
Unique Research/profil	2017-09-22	24	**33**	24	5	5	5	2	2	9
OGM/Kurier	2017-09-21	26	**33**	25	5	5	4	–	2	7
Research Affairs/Österreich	2017-09-21	24	**33**	25	6	6	4	–	2	8
Research Affairs/Österreich	2017-09-14	24	**33**	25	5	5	5	1	2	8
IMAS/Kronen Zeitung	2017-09-11	23	**34**	24	8	4	4	–	3	10
OGM/Kurier	2017-09-09	25	**33**	25	5	5	5	–	2	8
Market/Standard	2017-09-06	26	**33**	24	4	5	5	–	3	7
Research Affairs/Österreich	2017-09-06	24	**33**	24	6	5	5	1	2	9
Research Affairs/Österreich	2017-08-31	23	**33**	24	7	5	5	1	2	9
Unique Research/Heute	2017-08-30	24	**33**	23	6	5	5	2	2	9
Unique Research/profil	2017-08-25	25	**33**	23	4	6	6	–	3	8
Research Affairs/Österreich	2017-08-23	22	**33**	23	7	5	6	2	2	10
	2017-08-18	**List of parties participating in the election confirmed**								
Hajek/ATV	2017-08-16	27	**32**	24	5	6	4	–	2	5
Research Affairs/Österreich	2017-08-15	22	**34**	24	7	5	5	2	1	10
	2017-08-14	**SPÖ fires consultant Silberstein after arrested in Israel**								
	2017-08-10	**Former Team Stronach parliamentary leader Robert Lugar joins FPÖ**								
GfK/Kurier	2017-08-08	25	**32**	22	6	5	6	–	4	7
Akonsult/Bezirksblätter	2017-08-04	25	**32**	25	6	5	7	–	0	7
Market/Der Standard	2017-08-03	25	**33**	24	7	5	4	–	2	8
Research Affairs/Österreich	2017-08-02	23	**34**	23	7	5	4	2	2	11
Unique Research/profil	2017-07-27	26	**33**	22	7	6	5	–	1	7
	2017-07-25	**Peter Pilz presents his own list during a press conference**								
OGM/Kurier	2017-07-21	26	**32**	26	7	5	2	–	2	6
Research Affairs/Österreich	2017-07-20	24	**33**	24	8	6	–	–	5	9
Research Affairs/Österreich	2017-07-20	24	**33**	23	6	5	4	2	3 (Note: Lugar: 1)	9
Research Affairs/Österreich	2017-07-18	25	**32**	26	5 (Note: Without Irmgard Griss – Grüne: 6% and NEOS: 5%)	6	6	–	0	6
	2017-07-17	**Peter Pilz leaves Green parliamentary group, plans to run own list**								
IMAS	2017-07-14	25	**35**	24	11	3	–	–	2	10
GfK/Kurier	2017-07-12	25	**32**	22	7.5	5	6.5	–	2	7
Matzka/NEWS	2017-07-12	26	**32**	27	6	5	–	–	4	5
	2017-07-08	**Former independent candidate Irmgard Griss joins NEOS alliance**								
Research Affairs/Österreich	2017-07-06	24	**34**	25	8	5	–	–	4	9
Research Affairs/Österreich	2017-07-06	23	**34**	25	6	4	5	–	3	9
IFES (for SPÖ)	2017-07-04	31	**34**	22	8	4	–	–	2	3
Research Affairs/Österreich	2017-06-29	23	**33**	25	9	6	–	–	4	8
Spectra/OÖN	2017-06-29	23	**30**	27	9	5	–	–	6	3
Unique Research/profil	2017-06-23	28	**32**	25	8	5	–	–	2	4
Market/Der Standard	2017-06-21	26	**33**	24	9	4	–	–	4	7
Research Affairs/Österreich	2017-06-15	22	**33**	26	10	5	–	–	4	7
	2017-06-14	**SPÖ says willing to coalition with the FPÖ under certain conditions**								
Hajek/ATV	2017-06-08	26	**34**	24	9	5	–	–	2	8
Research Affairs/Österreich	2017-06-02	21	**34**	26	10	6	–	–	3	8
meinungsraum.at (for NEOS)	2017-05-31	28	**31**	24	9	6	–	–	2	3
Market/Der Standard	2017-05-23	27	**32**	25	9	5	–	–	2	5
	2017-05-19	**Ingrid Felipe elected Green leader, Ulrike Lunacek lead candidate**								
Unique Research/profil	2017-05-19	27	**33**	26	8	5	–	–	1	6
	2017-05-18	**Green leader Eva Glawischnig resigns**								
OGM/Kurier	2017-05-18	28	**31**	26	9	4	–	–	2	3
Unique Research/Heute	2017-05-18	26	**33**	26	8	5	–	–	2	7
Research Affairs/Österreich	2017-05-18	20	**35**	26	9	7	–	–	3	9
meinungsraum.at/ORF (Note: A total of 19% said they are still undecided, have no opinion, would cast a blank/spoilt ballot or wouldn't vote.)	2017-05-17	22	**26**	21	5	5	–	–	2	4
	2017-05-16	**Legislative election announced for 15 October 2017**								
	2017-05-14	**Sebastian Kurz elected ÖVP leader, announces creation of Kurz list**								
IFES (for SPÖ)	2017-05-14	**28**	**28**	26	12	5	–	–	1	Tie
Research Affairs/Österreich	2017-05-12	21	**35**	25	9	7	–	–	3	10
	2017-05-12	**Sebastian Kurz says willing to lead the ÖVP, wants new elections**								
	2017-05-10	**Vice-Chancellor Reinhold Mitterlehner resigns**								
Market/Der Standard	2017-05-08	28	21	**29**	11	7	–	–	4	1
Research Affairs/Österreich	2017-04-28	29	22	**32**	8	6	–	–	3	3
Unique Research/profil	2017-04-27	28	23	**32**	9	6	–	–	2	4
Spectra/OÖN	2017-04-22	28	21	**30**	12	4	–	–	5	2
IMAS/Kronen Zeitung	2017-04-20	25–27	25–27	**26–28**	13–15	4–6	–	–	1–3	1
Research Affairs/Österreich	2017-04-13	30	21	**32**	9	5	–	–	3	2
GfK (for ÖVP)	2017-04-07	**29–30**	23–24	27–28	10–11	4–5	–	–	4–5	2
Research Affairs/Österreich	2017-04-01	28	20	**33**	11	5	–	–	3	5
Market/Der Standard	2017-03-19	29	20	**30**	12	6	–	–	3	1
Unique Research/profil	2017-03-18	29	22	**31**	12	5	–	–	1	2
Research Affairs/Österreich	2017-03-17	29	19	**33**	12	6	–	–	1	4
Research Affairs/Österreich	2017-03-03	29	19	**33**	11	6	–	–	2	4
Unique Research/profil	2017-02-18	29	20	**31**	11	6	–	–	3	2
Research Affairs/Österreich	2017-02-16	28	19	**34**	11	6	–	–	2	6
Research Affairs/Österreich	2017-02-04	29	20	**33**	10	6	–	–	2	4
Research Affairs/Österreich	2017-01-07	27	18	**34**	12	7	–	–	2	7

=== 2016 and earlier ===
Polling firm	End date	SPÖ	ÖVP	FPÖ	Grüne	NEOS	Others	Lead
Unique Research/profil	2016-12-31	28	19	**34**	11	7	1	6
Gallup/Österreich	2016-12-12	27	19	**34**	12	6	2	7
Gallup/Österreich	2016-11-19	26	19	**35**	12	6	2	9
Unique Research/profil	2016-10-15	28	18	**34**	12	6	1	6
Gallup/Österreich	2016-10-08	27	19	**34**	12	6	2	7
Gallup/Österreich	2016-09-24	27	19	**34**	11	7	2	7
Gallup/Österreich	2016-09-09	26	20	**34**	11	7	2	8
Unique Research/profil	2016-09-09	26	19	**35**	12	6	2	9
Hajek/ATV	2016-09-02	26	21	**34**	12	6	1	8
OGM/Kurier	2016-08-28	26	21	**33**	12	6	2	7
Gallup/Österreich	2016-08-28	25	20	**35**	11	7	2	10
Gallup/Österreich	2016-07-31	25	19	**35**	12	7	2	10
Unique Research/profil	2016-07-18	24	20	**35**	14	6	1	11
Gallup/Österreich	2016-07-10	25	19	**34**	12	8	2	9
Hajek/ATV	2016-05-21	26	18	**34**	13	8	1	8
Gallup/Österreich	2016-05-20	23	22	**33**	13	6	3	10
	2016-05-17	**Christian Kern is sworn in as Chancellor**						
Gallup/Österreich	2016-05-12	21	22	**34**	13	7	3	12
	2016-05-09	**Chancellor Werner Faymann resigns**						
Gallup/Österreich	2016-04-28	21	22	**34**	14	6	3	12
OGM/OÖN	2016-04-09	23	23	**31**	14	6	3	8
Hajek/ATV	2016-04-09	22	22	**32**	15	7	2	10
Unique Research/Heute	2016-04-08	23	23	**32**	14	7	1	9
Gallup/Österreich	2016-04-06	23	24	**33**	12	5	3	9
Unique Research/profil	2016-03-19	22	24	**32**	14	6	2	8
Gallup/Österreich	2016-03-11	23	23	**33**	12	6	3	10
Market/Der Standard	2016-03-07	23	22	**32**	14	5	4	9
Unique Research/profil	2016-02-20	23	24	**32**	12	8	1	9
Gallup/Österreich	2016-01-31	22	23	**33**	11	7	4	10
Unique Research/Heute	2016-01-24	22	24	**31**	13	8	2	7
Unique Research/profil	2016-01-23	23	24	**30**	14	8	1	6
Gallup/Österreich	2016-01-16	22	22	**34**	11	7	4	12
IMAS/Kronen Zeitung	2015-12-20	26	25	**27**	13	5	1	1
Unique Research/profil	2015-12-19	22	24	**31**	13	8	2	7
Gallup/Österreich	2015-12-17	23	21	**33**	12	8	3	10
Unique Research/profil	2015-11-21	22	20	**32**	13	9	4	10
Gallup/Österreich	2015-11-19	24	21	**33**	12	7	3	9
Gallup/Österreich	2015-11-05	24	21	**32**	13	7	3	8
Unique Research/profil	2015-10-31	24	19	**32**	15	7	3	8
IMAS/Kronen Zeitung	2015-10-22	25	24	**32**	12	5	2	7
Gallup	2015-10-16	23	20	**33**	14	7	3	10
Unique Research	2015-09-19	23	21	**33**	14	6	3	10
Gallup	2015-09-18	25	21	**32**	12	6	4	7
Gallup	2015-09-04	25	22	**30**	13	6	4	5
IMAS/Kronen Zeitung	2015-08-23	**26**	**26**	**26**	13	5	4	Tie
Unique Research/profil	2015-08-22	22	23	**31**	13	7	4	8
Gallup/Österreich	2015-08-21	24	23	**29**	13	8	3	5
Market/Der Standard	2015-08-19	23	22	**29**	16	6	4	6
Gallup/Österreich	2015-07-31	23	23	**29**	14	7	4	6
Unique Research/profil	2015-07-25	24	23	**30**	13	8	2	6
Gallup/Österreich	2015-07-17	23	22	**29**	15	7	4	6
IMAS/Kronen Zeitung	2015-07-12	26	26	**27**	13	4	4	1
Gallup/Österreich	2015-07-03	23	24	**28**	15	6	4	4
Unique Research/Heute	2015-06-26	24	23	**29**	15	6	3	5
IFES/Kurier	2015-06-23	24	23	**27**	16	4	5	3
Unique Research/profil	2015-06-20	23	24	**28**	15	7	3	4
Gallup/Österreich	2015-06-19	24	24	**28**	15	5	4	4
IMAS/Kronen Zeitung	2015-06-15	**26**	**26**	**26**	14	4	1	Tie
Hajek/ATV	2015-06-10	23	25	**28**	15	6	3	3
Market/Der Standard	2015-06-06	23	23	**28**	15	6	5	5
Gallup/Österreich	2015-06-04	25	24	**28**	13	6	4	3
Gallup/Österreich	2015-05-30	26	25	**27**	13	5	4	1
Unique Research/profil	2015-05-21	26	25	**27**	13	6	3	1
Gallup/Österreich	2015-05-14	25	25	**26**	14	6	4	1
Gallup/Österreich	2015-05-10	**26**	**25**	**26**	13	6	4	Tie
Unique Research/profil	2015-04-25	**27**	24	26	14	6	3	1
Gallup/Österreich	2015-04-18	**28**	27	25	13	5	2	1
Gallup/Österreich	2015-04-17	**26**	**26**	**26**	12	6	4	Tie
Gallup/Österreich	2015-04-10	**26**	**26**	25	13	6	4	Tie
Gallup/Österreich	2015-04-01	**26**	**26**	25	12	7	4	Tie
Market/Der Standard	2015-03-29	23	24	**26**	15	6	3	2
Unique Research/Heute	2015-03-27	26	**27**	24	12	7	4	1
Unique Research/profil	2015-03-21	25	**26**	24	13	8	4	1
Gallup/Österreich	2015-03-20	**26**	25	**26**	13	6	4	Tie
Gallup	2015-03-13	25	24	**27**	13	7	4	2
Hajek/ATV	2015-03-12	24	**27**	26	12	7	4	1
AKonsult/Mein Bezirk	2015-03-10	25	25	**27**	13	6	4	2
Marked/Der Standard	2015-03-08	22	23	**27**	16	7	5	4
Gallup/Österreich	2015-02-27	25	24	**26**	13	8	4	1
IMAS/Kronen Zeitung	2015-02-22	**27**	26	25	14	5	3	1
Unique Research/profil	2015-02-21	**26**	**26**	**26**	12	8	3	Tie
meinungsraum.at/NEWS	2015-02-13	**26**	25	**26**	13	7	3	Tie
meinungsraum.at/NEWS	2015-02-12	25	24	**27**	12	7	5	2
Gallup/Österreich	2015-02-06	22	24	**26**	15	8	5	2
Gallup/Österreich	2015-01-31	25	25	**26**	13	7	4	1
Unique Research/profil	2015-01-24	26	26	**28**	12	7	1	2
Gallup/Österreich	2015-01-22	25	25	**26**	13	7	4	1
Gallup/Österreich	2015-01-09	24	26	**27**	13	6	4	1
Market/Der Standard	2015-01-01	23	23	**26**	15	8	5	3
OGM/Kurier	2015-01-01	25	**26**	**26**	14	7	2	Tie
AKonsult/Mein Bezirk	2014-12-29	24	**26**	**26**	14	8	2	Tie
IMAS/Kronen Zeitung	2014-12-20	**26**	**26**	25	14	4	5	Tie
Unique Research/profil	2014-12-20	25	**28**	25	12	8	2	3
Gallup/Österreich	2014-12-18	23	**27**	26	13	7	4	1
Gallup/Österreich	2014-12-05	24	**26**	25	14	7	4	1
Unique Research/heute	2014-12-05	25	**28**	25	12	8	2	3
Gallup/Österreich	2014-11-27	**25**	**25**	**25**	14	7	4	Tie
Hajek/ATV	2014-11-27	24	**28**	26	12	7	3	2
meinungsraum.at/NEWS	2014-11-27	23	24	**27**	15	7	4	3
OGM/Kurier	2014-11-23	22	23	**25**	16	9	5	2
OGM/Kurier	2014-11-22	25	**27**	25	14	7	2	2
Unique Research/profil	2014-11-15	**27**	**27**	26	12	7	1	Tie
Gallup/Österreich	2014-11-14	**25**	**25**	24	14	7	5	Tie
Gallup/Österreich	2014-10-31	25	25	**26**	14	6	4	1
Gallup/Österreich	2014-10-31	25	25	**26**	14	6	4	1
Gallup/Österreich	2014-10-23	**25**	24	**25**	14	8	4	Tie
meinungsraum.at/NEWS	2014-10-23	25	25	**26**	12	9	3	1
IMAS/Kronen Zeitung	2014-10-19	**25**	24	24	13	8	6	1
Unique Research/profil	2014-10-18	25	25	**26**	12	9	3	1
Gallup/Österreich	2014-10-10	25	24	**26**	14	8	3	1
Market/Der Standard	2014-10-10	22	21	**26**	16	10	5	4
Gallup/Österreich	2014-10-02	25	24	**26**	15	8	2	1
Hajek/ATV	2014-09-25	24	24	**26**	13	9	4	2
AKonsult/Mein Bezirk	2014-09-19	25	24	**26**	14	9	2	1
Gallup/Österreich	2014-09-18	25	23	**26**	15	8	3	1
Gallup/Österreich	2014-09-13	25	21	**27**	15	9	3	2
Unique Research/profil	2014-09-13	25	25	**26**	12	9	3	1
Unique Research/heute	2014-09-04	25	24	**26**	11	10	4	1
Gallup/Österreich	2014-09-04	25	20	**28**	15	9	3	3
Gallup/Österreich	2014-08-30	25	19	**28**	15	10	3	3
Market/Der Standard	2014-08-26	23	19	**28**	14	10	6	5
Gallup/Österreich	2014-08-22	25	19	**27**	14	11	4	2
IMAS/Kronen Zeitung	2014-08-09	**26**	22	24	14	8	6	2
Gallup/Österreich	2014-08-09	25	19	**28**	14	10	4	3
Unique Research/profil	2014-08-09	25	19	**29**	13	10	4	4
Gallup/Österreich	2014-08-02	24	19	**28**	14	10	5	4
Gallup/Österreich	2014-07-18	25	20	**27**	15	10	3	2
Market/Der Standard	2014-07-13	22	18	**27**	15	11	7	5
Unique Research/profil	2014-07-12	24	21	**28**	12	11	4	4
Gallup/Österreich	2014-07-05	26	20	**27**	14	9	4	2
meinungsraum.at/NEWS	2014-06-26	23	19	**28**	14	10	6	5
OGM/Kurier	2014-06-21	**26**	22	25	13	10	4	1
Gallup/Österreich	2014-06-18	25	21	**27**	14	9	4	2
Unique Research/profil	2014-06-14	25	21	**28**	13	10	3	3
IMAS/Kronen Zeitung	2014-06-13	**27**	23	24	13	8	5	3
Market	2014-06-10	22	19	**27**	15	11	6	5
Hajek/ATV	2014-06-08	25	20	**27**	11	13	4	2
Unique Research/Heute	2014-06-06	24	22	**26**	13	11	4	2
Gallup/Österreich	2014-05-28	25	21	**26**	14	11	3	1
2014 European election	2014-10-25	24.1	**27.0**	19.7	14.5	8.1	6.4	2.9
Gallup/Österreich	2014-05-10	24	20	**25**	13	13	5	1
Gallup/Österreich	2014-05-01	**24**	20	**24**	13	14	5	Tie
Market/Der Standard	2014-04-21	22	19	**27**	12	13	7	5
IMAS/Kronen Zeitung	2014-04-16	**26**	22	23	13	12	4	3
Gallup/Östtereich	2014-04-12	**24**	20	23	14	14	5	1
OGM/Kurier	2014-04-06	**26**	21	24	12	13	4	2
Gallup/Östtereich	2014-03-30	**24**	19	**24**	14	14	5	Tie
Gallup/Östtereich	2014-03-23	22	20	**24**	14	14	6	2
meinungsraum.at/NEWS	2014-03-20	24	18	**27**	12	14	5	3
IMAS/Kronen Zeitung	2014-03-15	24	21	**26**	11	10	8	2
Hajek/ATV	2014-03-13	24	20	**27**	12	13	4	3
Market/Der Standard	2014-03-11	22	19	**27**	13	13	6	5
Gallup/Österreich	2014-03-07	23	20	**24**	14	13	6	1
Gallup/Österreich	2014-02-14	22	19	**24**	14	14	7	2
Gallup/Österreich	2014-01-30	23	19	**25**	14	15	4	2
Market/Der Standard	2014-01-19	23	20	**26**	12	11	8	3
IMAS/Kronen Zeitung	2014-01-18	**25**	23	**25**	13	7	7	Tie
Gallup/Österreich	2014-01-17	24	20	**25**	14	12	5	1
meinungsraum.at/NEWS	2014-01-15	**26**	19	**26**	12	12	5	Tie
Gallup/Österreich	2014-01-12	**24**	21	**24**	14	12	5	Tie
Market/Der Standard	2013-12-22	24	20	**26**	12	11	7	2
Gallup/Österreich	2013-12-21	**24**	20	**24**	15	11	6	Tie
Gallup/Österreich	2013-12-14	**24**	21	**24**	15	10	6	Tie
Hajek/ATV	2013-12-12	23	20	**26**	14	11	6	3
Market/Der Standard	2013-12-06	23	21	**25**	13	10	8	2
Market/Der Standard	2013-12-06	23	21	**25**	13	10	8	2
Gallup/Österreich	2013-11-29	**25**	22	23	15	10	5	2
Market/trend	2013-11-24	23	22	**25**	13	9	8	2
Karmasin/profil	2013-11-23	**26**	23	23	14	9	5	3
Gallup/Österreich	2013-11-16	**26**	23	23	14	9	5	3
Karmasin/Heute	2013-11-08	**27**	23	22	12	9	7	4
Market/Der Standard	2013-10-27	**25**	23	24	12	8	8	1
Karmasin/profil	2013-10-26	**26**	23	23	12	8	8	3
Gallup/Österreich	2013-10-25	**27**	24	22	13	8	6	3
Market/Der Standard	2013-10-20	**25**	23	**25**	12	7	8	Tie
Gallup/Österreich	2013-10-17	**28**	23	22	13	8	6	5
Gallup/Österreich	2013-10-03	**28**	23	21	13	7	8	5
2013 legislative election	2013-09-29	**26.8**	24.0	20.5	12.4	5.0	11.3	2.8

== Hypothetical polls with Kurz as ÖVP leader ==
Polling firm	End date	SPÖ	ÖVP	FPÖ	Grüne	NEOS	Others	Lead
Research Affairs/Österreich	2017-04-28	23	34	25	9	6	3	9
Research Affairs/Österreich	2017-04-13	24	34	25	9	5	3	9
Research Affairs/Österreich	2017-04-01	23	35	26	10	4	2	9
Research Affairs/Österreich	2017-03-16	24	34	25	11	5	1	9
Research Affairs/Österreich	2017-03-04	24	34	26	10	4	2	8
Unique Research/ATV	2017-02-24	26	32	24	9	6	3	6
Research Affairs/Österreich	2017-02-16	23	35	26	11	4	1	9
2013 legislative election	2013-09-29	26.8	24.0	20.5	12.4	5.0	11.3	2.8

== See also ==
- Opinion polling for the Austrian presidential election, 2016
