= 2010 Austrian presidential election =

- 25 April 2010
- Turnout: 53.57%
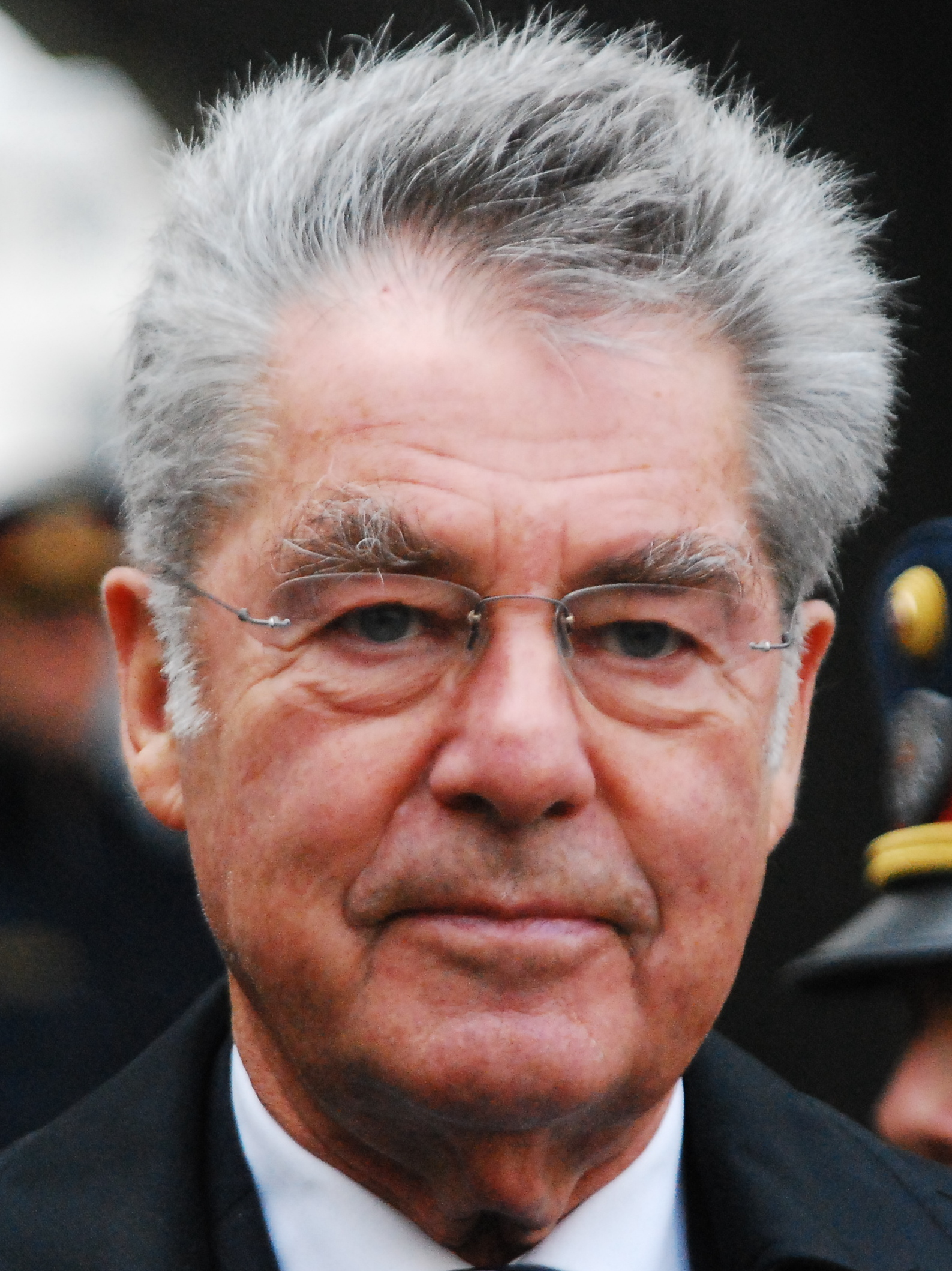

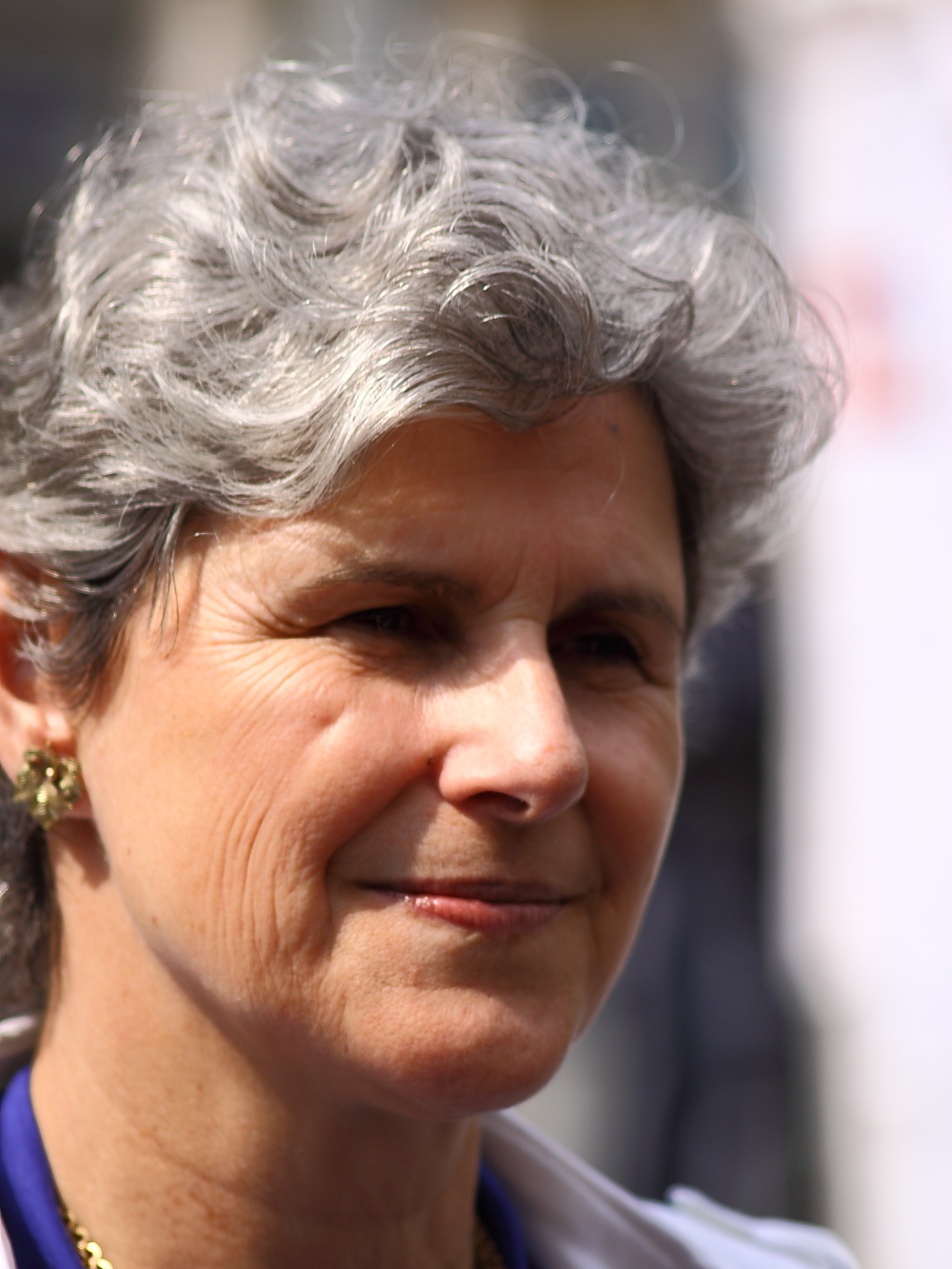

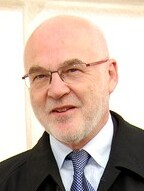
Candidate	Heinz Fischer	Barbara Rosenkranz	Rudolf Gehring
Party	Independent (Note: The President of Austria traditionally resigns from party membership after taking office. Although Fischer was officially an independent, his campaign was endorsed and funded by Social Democratic Party of Austria.)	FPÖ	Christian Party
Popular vote	2,508,373	481,923	171,668
Percentage	79.33%	15.24%	5.43%
President before election
Heinz Fischer
Independent (SPÖ)
Elected President
Heinz Fischer
Independent (SPÖ)

Presidential elections were held in Austria on 25 April 2010, the twelfth election of an Austrian head of state since 1951. The candidates were President Heinz Fischer (independent, formerly SPÖ), Barbara Rosenkranz (FPÖ) and Rudolf Gehring (CPÖ). Heinz Fischer won with just under 80% of the valid votes. Voter turnout was a historic low of 54%.

== Candidates ==
=== Social Democratic Party of Austria ===
Incumbent President Heinz Fischer (independent, former member of the Social Democratic Party) announced on 23 November 2009 that he will seek a second term. According to a 27 June 2009, Gallup poll for the newspaper Österreich, Fischer had a job approval rating of 80%.

=== Austrian People's Party ===
There were rumours that the candidate of the Austrian People's Party would be either Governor of Lower Austria Erwin Pröll or president of the Austrian Federal Economic Chamber Christoph Leitl. On 13 October 2009 Pröll announced that he would not run for the presidency and that he would remain Governor of Lower Austria. Leitl and former governor of Styria Waltraud Klasnic also declined a presidential run. On 25 February 2010, the People's Party announced that it would not nominate a candidate, and would not officially support any candidate.

=== Freedom Party of Austria ===
The Freedom Party announced in June 2009 that it would definitely field a candidate "to prevent Fischer['s reelection]". Possible candidates mentioned included Martin Graf, Norbert Steger, Siegfried Dillersberger, Norbert Gugerbauer, Dieter Böhmdorfer and Wilhelm Brauneder. After the Carinthian branch of the Alliance for the Future of Austria broke away to re-unite with the Freedom Party, it was rumoured that Barbara Rosenkranz would be their candidate. In early January 2010, Heinz-Christian Strache, leader of the Freedom Party, guaranteed that the party would nominate a candidate to assure that Fischer would not run unopposed. On 28 February 2010, Strache announced in the Kronen Zeitung that the Freedom Party would nominate Barbara Rosenkranz as its presidential candidate.

=== Alliance for the Future of Austria ===
Alliance for the Future of Austria leader Josef Bucher and General Secretary Stefan Petzner voiced their support for a presidential candidacy of Claudia Haider, widow of former Alliance leader Jörg Haider, by inviting the Greens and the Freedom Party to form a non-partisan committee. Carinthia Governor Gerhard Dörfler spoke out against such a candidacy, because he "wouldn't like to join forces with Heinz-Christian Strache's [Freedom Party]", but nonetheless said that Claudia Haider would be a "good candidate, who could finance her campaign on her own". On 17 August, Haider announced that she would not run for president. On 26 February 2010, Bucher said that he might run as a candidate for his party, because "he could appeal to [People's Party] voters". On 1 March 2010, the Alliance announced that Bucher would not stand as a candidate, as the odds were clearly against him and they did not want to waste taxpayers' money.

=== The Greens – The Green Alternative ===
It was expected that former Green Party leader Alexander Van der Bellen might stand in the election, but he stated in January 2009 that if Fischer ran for reelection he would have his support. In June 2009, however, Green party leader Eva Glawischnig stated that the Greens were considering fielding a candidate, and that Van der Bellen would be a very good candidate. By November 2009, there was still no clear decision from the Greens, even though Van der Bellen had ruled out a run for the presidency on 23 November 2009. On 25 February 2010, the Greens announced they wanted to concentrate on state elections and would not nominate a candidate. After Fischer appeared at an event where the Greens questioned him on a number of issues, with questions submitted by voters via the internet, the Greens on 12 April 2010 officially endorsed his candidacy and called for their voters to vote for him, a first in the party's history.

=== Christian Party of Austria ===
The Christian Party nominated its chairman Rudolf Gehring as a presidential candidate. On 25 March 2010, they announced they had gathered the necessary number signatures to run for president.

=== Other candidates ===
A former judge from eastern Styria, Martin Wabl, who had twice previously tried to run for president, announced on 6 February 2009 that he would run again. Green municipal councillor Ulrich Habsburg-Lothringen, as a descendant of the former ruling house of Austria-Hungary incapacitated by constitutional law to run for Austria's presidency, stated that he wanted to test the law at Austria's constitutional court if his candidacy is not permitted. Bernhard Gregor Honemann (nominated by the platform agenda2020.at) also planned to run. None of these candidates obtained the 6000 signatures necessary to run for president. The signatures submitted were:

- Fischer: 45,000 signatures
- Rosenkranz: 10,500 signatures
- Gehring: 8,000 signatures

== Voter statistics ==
According to the federal election commission, 6,355,800 Austrian citizens aged 16+ were eligible to vote in the presidential election. Compared with the 2004 presidential election, the number of eligible voters increased by 324,818, or 5.4% – primarily due to lowering the legal voting age to 16 between the two elections. 3,307,366 women and 3,048,434 men were eligible to vote.

Total number of eligible voters by state:

- Burgenland: 231,257
- Carinthia: 447,679
- Lower Austria: 1,267,379
- Upper Austria: 1,092,760
- Salzburg: 391,142
- Styria: 973,009
- Tyrol: 530,265
- Vorarlberg: 265,026
- Vienna: 1,157,283

== Opinion polls ==
=== Social Democrats v. Freedom Party v. Christian Party ===
Source	Date	Social Democrats	Freedom Party	Christian Party	Undecided
Karmasin/Profil	17 April 2010	Heinz Fischer – 82%	Barbara Rosenkranz – 13%	Rudolf Gehring – 5%	—
Market/Standard	16 April 2010	Heinz Fischer – 60%	Barbara Rosenkranz – 15%	Rudolf Gehring – 4%	21%
Gallup/Österreich	16 April 2010	Heinz Fischer – 80%	Barbara Rosenkranz – 16%	Rudolf Gehring – 4%	—
Gallup/Österreich	9 April 2010	Heinz Fischer – 82%	Barbara Rosenkranz – 14%	Rudolf Gehring – 4%	—
Karmasin/Profil	9 April 2010	Heinz Fischer – 82%	Barbara Rosenkranz – 12%	Rudolf Gehring – 6%	—
Market/Standard	1 April 2010	Heinz Fischer – 71%	Barbara Rosenkranz – 13%	Rudolf Gehring – 2%	14%

=== Social Democrats v. Freedom Party ===
Source	Date	Social Democrats	Freedom Party	Undecided
Peter Hajek/ATV	31 March 2010	Heinz Fischer – 80%	Barbara Rosenkranz – 13%	7%
Gallup/Österreich	27 March 2010	Heinz Fischer – 86%	Barbara Rosenkranz – 14%	—
OGM/News	17 March 2010	Heinz Fischer – 81%	Barbara Rosenkranz – 19%	—
Gallup/Österreich	12 March 2010	Heinz Fischer – 84%	Barbara Rosenkranz – 16%	—
Market/Standard	5 March 2010	Heinz Fischer – 65%	Barbara Rosenkranz – 17%	18%
OGM/News	3 March 2010	Heinz Fischer – 74%	Barbara Rosenkranz – 26%	—
Gallup/Österreich	27 February 2010	Heinz Fischer – 79%	Barbara Rosenkranz – 21%	—
Gallup/Österreich	27 February 2010	Heinz Fischer – 84%	Heinz-Christian Strache – 16%	—

=== Social Democrats v. People's Party ===
Source	Date	Social Democrats	People's Party	Undecided
IMAS/Kronen Zeitung	28 June 2009	Heinz Fischer – 62%	Erwin Pröll – 20%	18%
Gallup/Österreich	27 June 2009	Heinz Fischer – 62%	Erwin Pröll – 25%	13%
OGM/News	25 June 2009	Heinz Fischer – 53%	Erwin Pröll – 30%	17%
Market/Standard	25 June 2009	Heinz Fischer – 54%	Erwin Pröll – 30%	16%
Gallup/Österreich	4 April 2009	Heinz Fischer – 67%	Erwin Pröll – 18%	15%

=== All parties ===
Source	Date	Social Democrats	People's Party	Freedom Party	Greens	Alliance	Undecided
Gallup/Österreich	9 August 2009	Heinz Fischer – 50%	Erwin Pröll – 24%	Martin Graf – 3%	Alexander Van der Bellen – 8%	Claudia Haider – 4%	11%
Gallup/Österreich	27 June 2009	Heinz Fischer – 51%	Erwin Pröll – 17%	Heinz-Christian Strache – 8%	Alexander Van der Bellen – 9%	Claudia Haider – 5%	10%

== Results ==
Heinz Fischer beat Barbara Rosenkranz by scoring 79.3% of the vote. Rosenkranz received 15.2%. Rudolf Gehring came third by scoring 5.4%.

Opinion polls had placed Fischer in a good position on the day of the election.

Fischer thanked the nation on television: "I am extremely happy and thank the Austrian population for having so much confidence in me".

Poor voter turnout – only 53.6% voted – led again to calls by leaders for the post to be abolished.

Candidate	Party	Votes	%
Heinz Fischer	Independent (SPÖ)	2,508,373	79.33
Barbara Rosenkranz	Freedom Party of Austria	481,923	15.24
Rudolf Gehring	Christian Party of Austria	171,668	5.43
Total		3,161,964	100.00
Valid votes		3,161,964	92.87
Invalid/blank votes		242,682	7.13
Total votes		3,404,646	100.00
Registered voters/turnout		6,355,800	53.57
Source: Federal Ministry for the Interior

=== By state ===
State	Heinz Fischer	Barbara Rosenkranz	Rudolf Gehring	Electorate	Votes	Valid votes	Invalid votes
Burgenland	104,553	20,566	7,174	231,257	148,272	132,293	15,979
Lower Austria	534,583	116,520	35,762	1,267,379	759,052	686,865	72,187
Wien	415,747	71,124	16,973	1,157,283	534,408	503,844	30,564
Kärnten	140,806	39,890	11,211	447,679	207,876	191,907	15,969
Steiermark	315,038	64,359	23,681	973,009	430,126	403,078	27,048
Upper Austria	417,340	80,984	30,540	1,092,760	569,877	528,864	41,013
Salzburg	136,811	27,926	11,137	391,142	188,881	175,874	13,007
Tirol	152,359	24,429	11,646	530,265	196,079	188,434	7,645
Vorarlberg	70,771	7,078	9,383	265,026	90,830	87,232	3,598
Source: European Election Database
