= Ulrich Habsburg-Lothringen =

Austrian politician (born 1941)

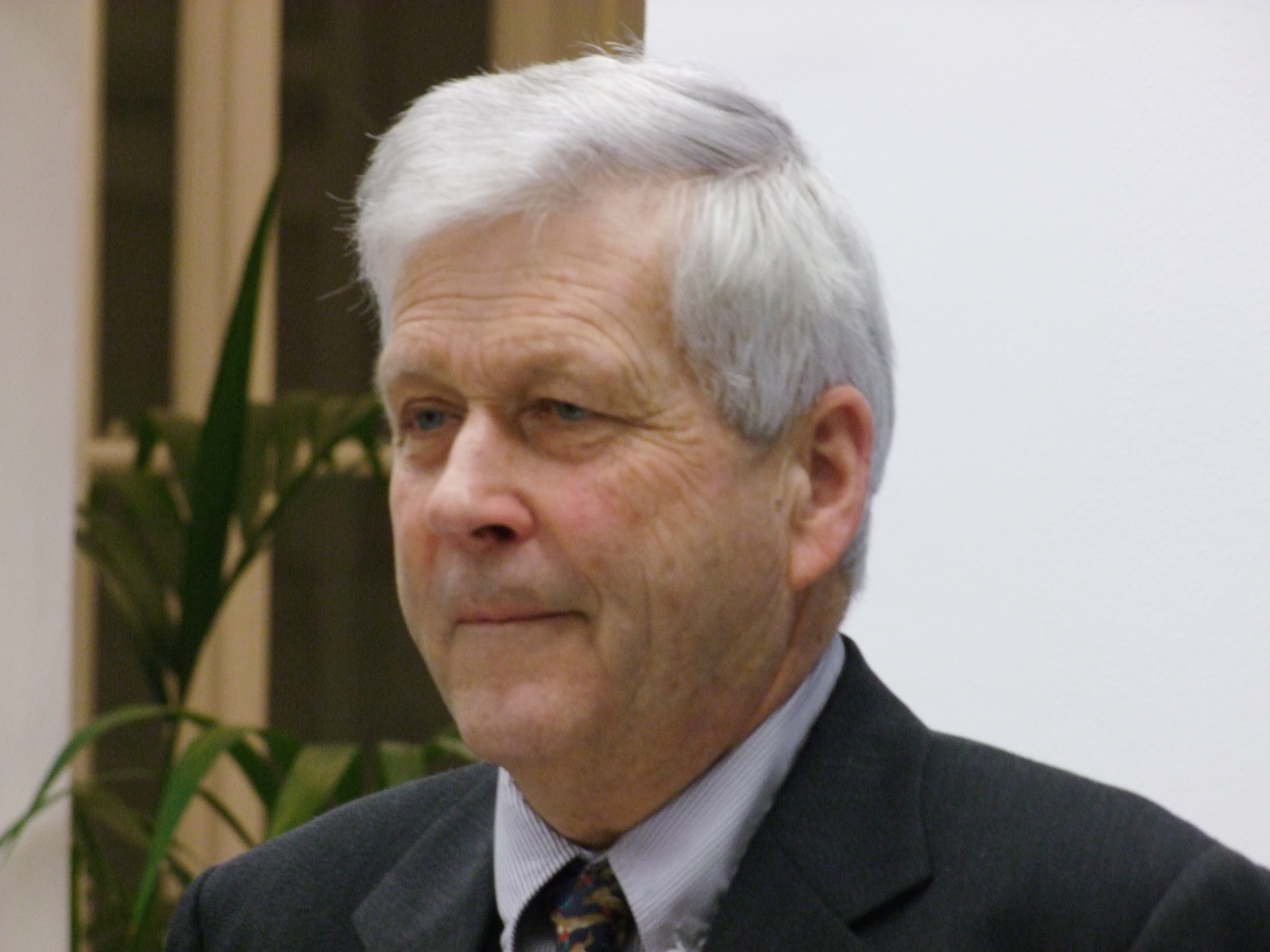
Ulrich Habsburg-Lothringen (2010)

Ulrich Habsburg-Lothringen (born 1941 in Wolfsberg, Carinthia, Nazi Germany (now Austria)) is an Austrian forester and politician, who was formerly in the Green Party of Austria, but is now non-partisan. He is a member of the Habsburg Family who wanted to participate in the election for the Austrian Federal President in the 2010 election. However, being member of a formerly ruling family, he was not eligible to do so. That law has been cancelled since, so he can now participate. He thought about another try for the following presidential election, which was held in April 2016, but finally decided to endorse the non-partisan judge Irmgard Griss instead.

He is the grandson of Archduke Heinrich Ferdinand, fourth son of the last Grand Duke of Tuscany, Ferdinand IV, and a distant cousin of the late Otto von Habsburg. All parties in the Austrian National Council voted for allowing members of ruling or formerly ruling families to participate on national elections.

Another of Ulrich's proposals is to re-introduce the use of hereditary noble titles in Austria. The Green Party, of which he was a member, does not support his proposal.

== Sources ==
- Interview with Ulrich Habsburg-Lothringen (German)
- Ulrich Habsburg-Lothringen about Austrian nobility (German)
