= Horst Rosenkranz =

Austrian politician (born 1943)

Horst Jakob Rosenkranz (born 16 April 1943 in Harmannsdorf, Lower Austria) is an extreme right publisher and former politician in Austria. He is married to Freedom Party (FPÖ) leader Barbara Rosenkranz.

== Political Activity ==
Rosenkranz was a member of the Austrian National Democratic Party (NDP), which was banned for violating the Verbotsgesetz 1947 (Prohibition Act 1947) against Holocaust denial, and the party Ein Herz für Inländer ("A Heart for Natives"). In the 1990 election he entered as a frontrunner for the Nein zur Ausländerflut ("No to the flood of Foreigners") ticket, which he founded with Gerd Honsik., which was also banned by election authorities in Vienna. Beginning in the nineties, Rosenkranz overtook the leadership of the Association demanding the whole Truth" (Vereins zur Förderung der ganzen Wahrheit). At the same time he was a representative of the "Critical Democratic" Party and supporter of the nonpartisan "Austria for the Austrians" referendum. He is also the publisher of the magazine Fakten, which was classified as extreme right wing by the Documentation Centre of Austrian Resistance. Rosenkranz, who describes himself as a "right-thinking person", has withdrawn from public life in recent years and is only rarely seen at official events, although he has appeared at Freedom Party events as a speaker.
