= 2016 Austrian presidential election =

- 24 April 2016 (first round); 22 May 2016 (annulled second round); 4 December 2016 (second round re-run)
- Turnout: 68.50% (first round); 72.65% (second round); 74.21% (second round re-run)
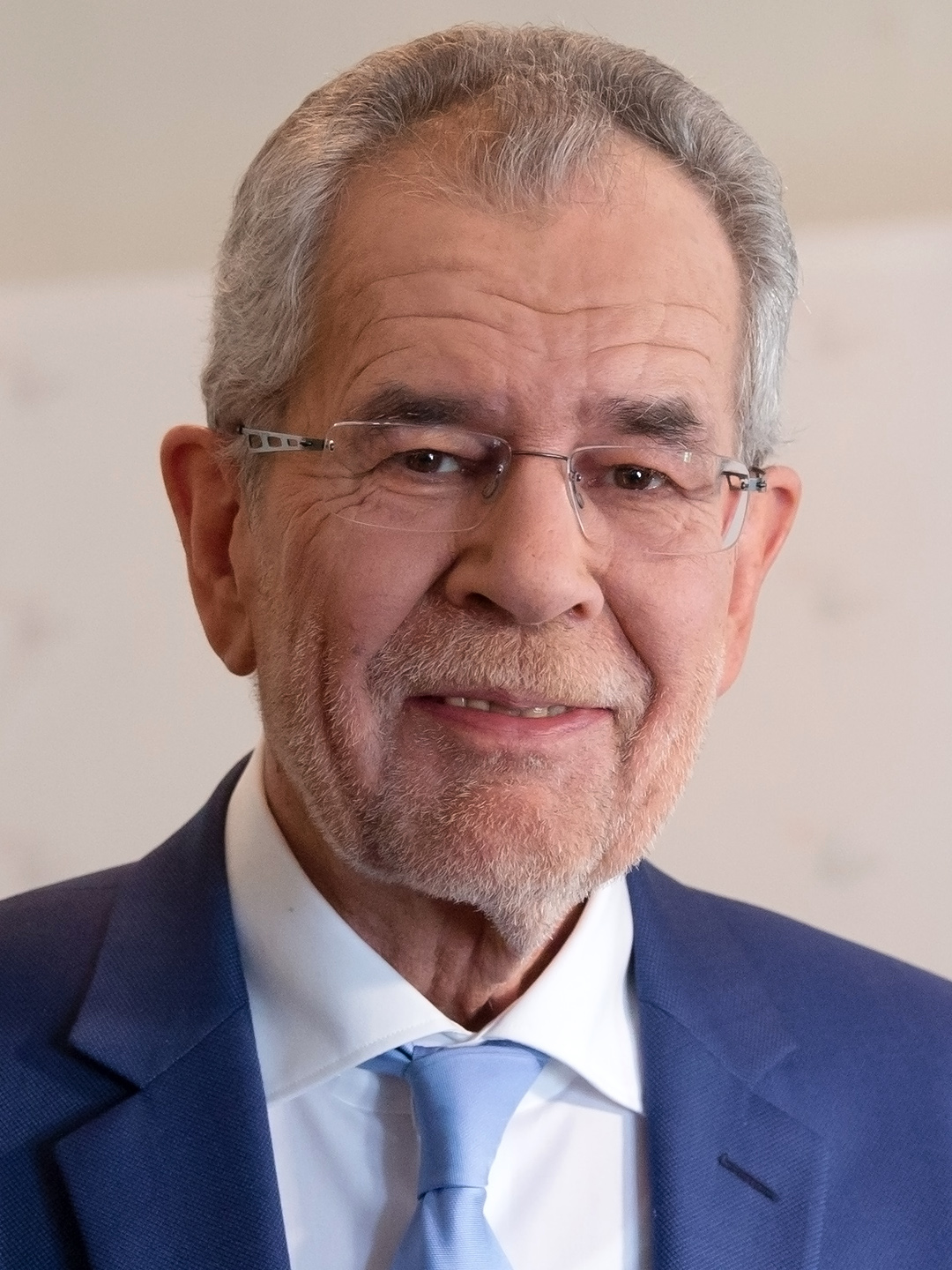

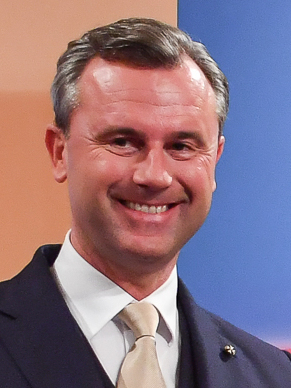
Candidate	Alexander Van der Bellen	Norbert Hofer
Party	Independent (Greens)	FPÖ
Popular vote	2,472,892	2,124,661
Percentage	53.79%	46.21%
President before election
Heinz Fischer
Independent
Elected President
Alexander Van der Bellen
Independent

Presidential elections were held in Austria on 24 April 2016, with a second round run-off on 22 May 2016. However, the results of the second round were annulled and a re-vote took place on 4 December 2016.

Incumbent President Heinz Fischer had served two terms and was not eligible to be elected for a third successive term. In the first round of the election, Norbert Hofer of the Freedom Party of Austria (FPÖ) received the most votes. Alexander Van der Bellen, an independent candidate who formerly a member of both the Austrian Greens and the Social Democratic, placed second. The candidates of the two governing parties, the Social Democratic and Austrian People's parties, placed fourth and fifth respectively, behind independent Irmgard Griss in third place, which led to a government crisis and the resignation of Chancellor Werner Faymann. Since no candidate received a majority of the vote, Hofer and Van der Bellen went head-to-head in the second round in May. This was the first time since the Second World War that an Austrian president had not been backed by either the People's or the Social Democratic party. During the run-off, Van der Bellen defeated Hofer on 23 May 2016 after the postal ballots had been counted.

On 1 July, the results of the second round of voting were annulled after the results in 20 of the 117 administrative districts were challenged, and the Constitutional Court of Austria found that Austrian electoral law had been disregarded in 14 of them. The Court found that over 77,900 absentee votes were improperly counted too early, though no indication of fraud was found. The second round re-vote was planned on 2 October, but was postponed to 4 December 2016.

Van der Bellen ultimately won the second round re-vote with 53.8% of the vote and a voter turnout of 74.2%. Hofer conceded the race to Van der Bellen when the result had become apparent shortly after polls closed. Van der Bellen was sworn in as the twelfth president of Austria on 26 January 2017.

== Electoral system ==
The president of Austria is directly elected by universal adult suffrage once every six years. The election is held under a two-round system; if no candidate receives more than 50% of votes cast in the first round, then a second ballot occurs in which only those two candidates who received the greatest number of votes in the first round may stand. The constitution grants the president the power to appoint the chancellor and, by extension, federal cabinet ministers, Supreme Court justices, military officers, and most major bureaucrats. The president may dissolve the National Council. In practice, however, the president acts as a figurehead.

== Candidates ==
=== Social Democratic Party (SPÖ) ===
The most likely candidate of the Social Democratic Party was considered to be Labour Minister Rudolf Hundstorfer, though President of the National Council Doris Bures, former Chancellor Franz Vranitzky and former undersecretary for EU affairs Brigitte Ederer were also mentioned. On 15 January 2016, Hundstorfer was officially announced as the SPÖ's candidate.

Social Democratic Party of Austria

Rudolf Hundstorfer

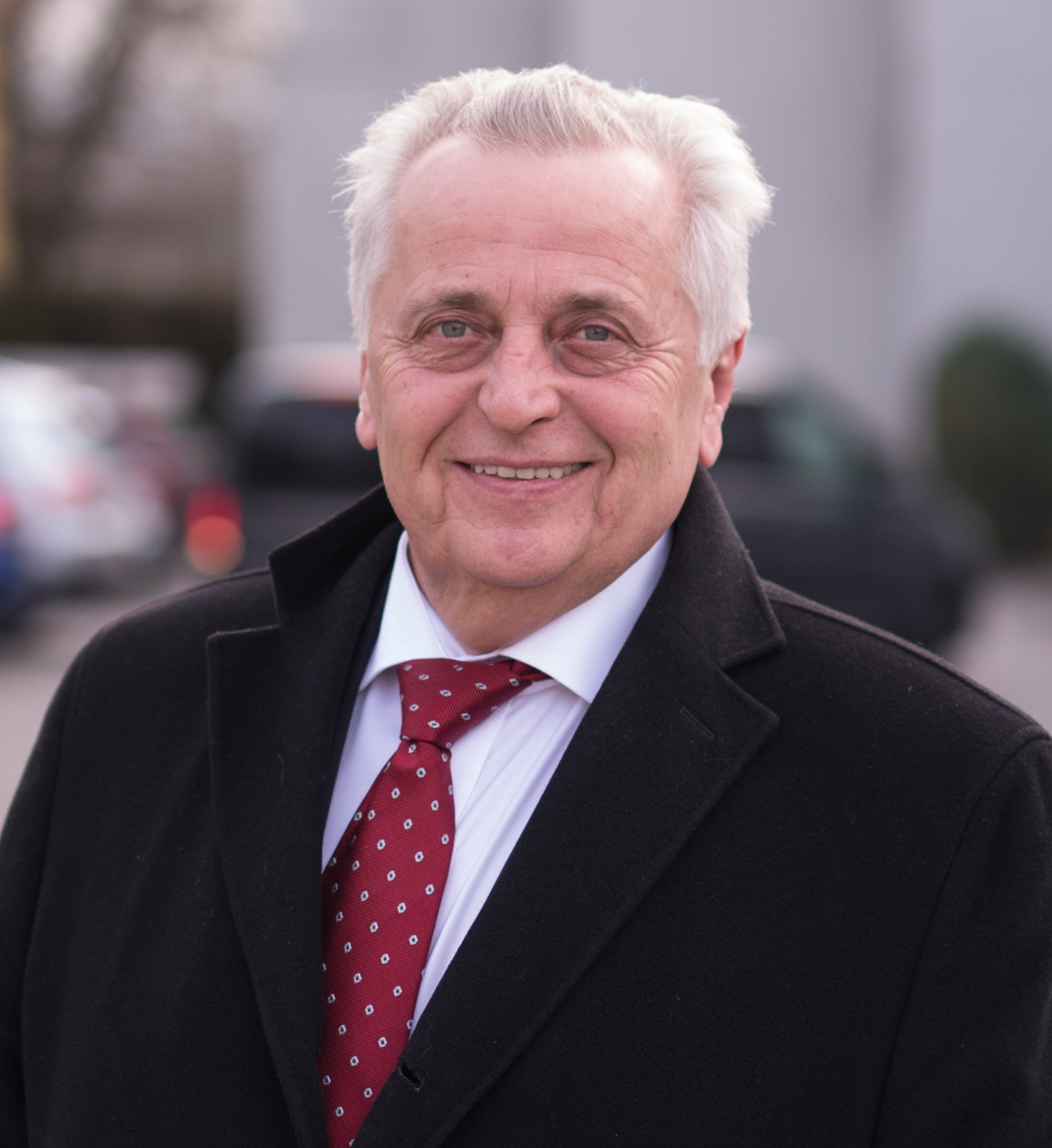

Minister of Social Affairs
(2008–2016)

=== Austrian People's Party (ÖVP) ===
Justice Minister Wolfgang Brandstetter declined to stand on 26 December 2015. On 7 January 2016, ÖVP leader Reinhold Mitterlehner announced that Erwin Pröll, the Landeshauptmann of Lower Austria, would not be running. Josef Pühringer, Landeshauptmann of Upper Austria declined to stand on 8 January 2016, as did former European Commissioner Franz Fischler and Member of the European Parliament Othmar Karas. President of the Austrian Federal Economic Chamber Christoph Leitl only said he would not comment before the announcement by the party leadership on 10 January 2016. Controversial former chancellor Wolfgang Schüssel was briefly considered as a candidate, but he also declined. Other names mentioned were former Science Minister and university professor Karlheinz Töchterle, former Foreign Minister Ursula Plassnik and former Raiffeisen Zentralbank manager Christian Konrad. On 10 January 2016, former first president of the National Council Andreas Khol was announced as the ÖVP's candidate.

Austrian People's Party

Andreas Khol

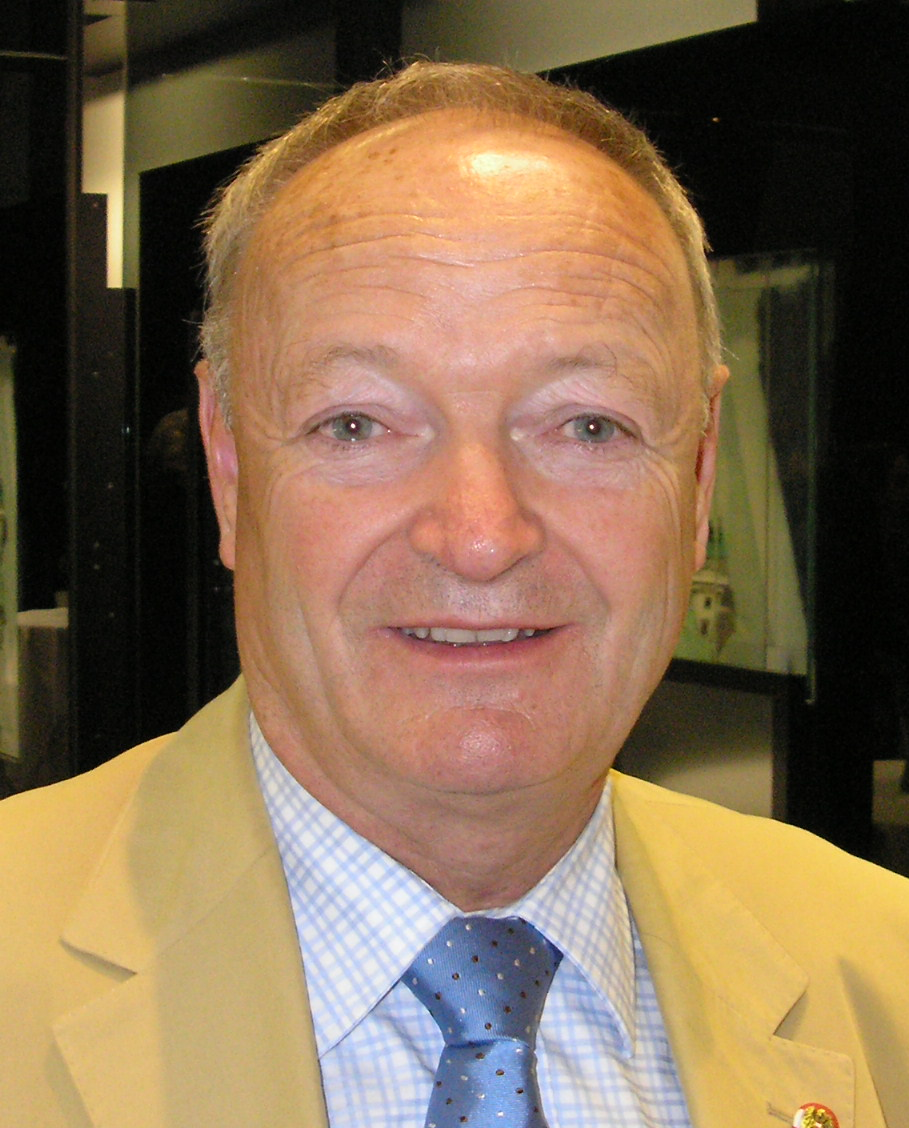

President of the National Council
(2002–2006)

=== Freedom Party of Austria (FPÖ) ===
Norbert Hofer, who serves as the Third President of the National Council, had been considered the most likely Freedom Party of Austria (FPÖ) candidate. On 28 December 2015 he said that he considered himself too young for the office and that he would prefer his party to pick someone else as its candidate. Other possible candidates included President of the Austrian Court of Audit Josef Moser, former Mayor of Vienna's 1st district Ursula Stenzel, ombudsman Peter Fichtenbauer and possibly party leader Heinz-Christian Strache himself. As of 11 January 2016, Fichtenbauer, Moser and Stenzel continued to be the most likely candidates. Strache announced on 13 January 2016 that he would not be running himself, and that it was still open whether the FPÖ would nominate anyone at all. In mid-January, Vienna Vice-Mayor Johann Gudenus and former FPÖ leader and former Vice-Chancellor Norbert Steger were also mentioned as possible candidates. On 19 January 2016, author and Middle East/migration pundit Karin Kneissl was mentioned as being recruited by the FPÖ to run, which she quickly declined.

On 20 January 2016, media reported that Gudenus had been internally selected as the FPÖ's candidate; on 26 January 2016, reports claimed Stenzel would be announced on 28 January 2016 as the FPÖ's candidate. Amid strong FPÖ-internal dissent, there were rumours the party leadership had been forced to reconsider, and that Hofer was now the most likely option, after all, with Gudenus also still in play. Commentators opined that the backtracking was a notable defeat for Strache. Hofer was announced as the FPÖ's candidate on 28 January 2016.

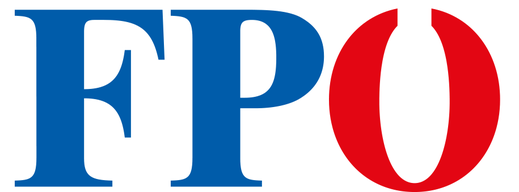
Freedom Party of Austria

Norbert Hofer

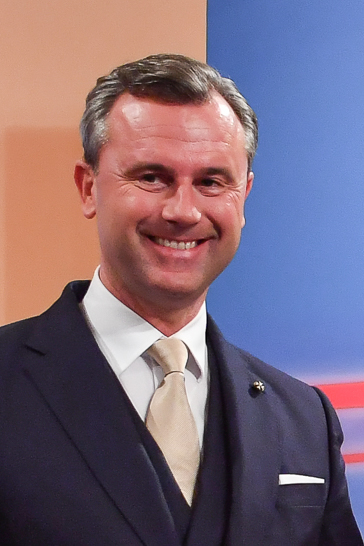

Third President of the National Council
(2013–2017)

=== Alexander Van der Bellen (Independent) ===
In early January 2016, it was announced that former Greens party leader and former Social Democratic party member Alexander Van der Bellen would run as an independent candidate. Van der Bellen announced his candidacy on 8 January 2016. Van der Bellen suspended his party membership of Greens before the election to demonstrate his independence. In spite of this, the Greens continued to be a leading supporter of Van der Bellen's campaign.

The NEOS – The New Austria and Liberal Forum leader Strolz stated that they would consider giving him the same support as Griss, depending on the same kind of hearing she went through.

Greens

Alexander Van der Bellen

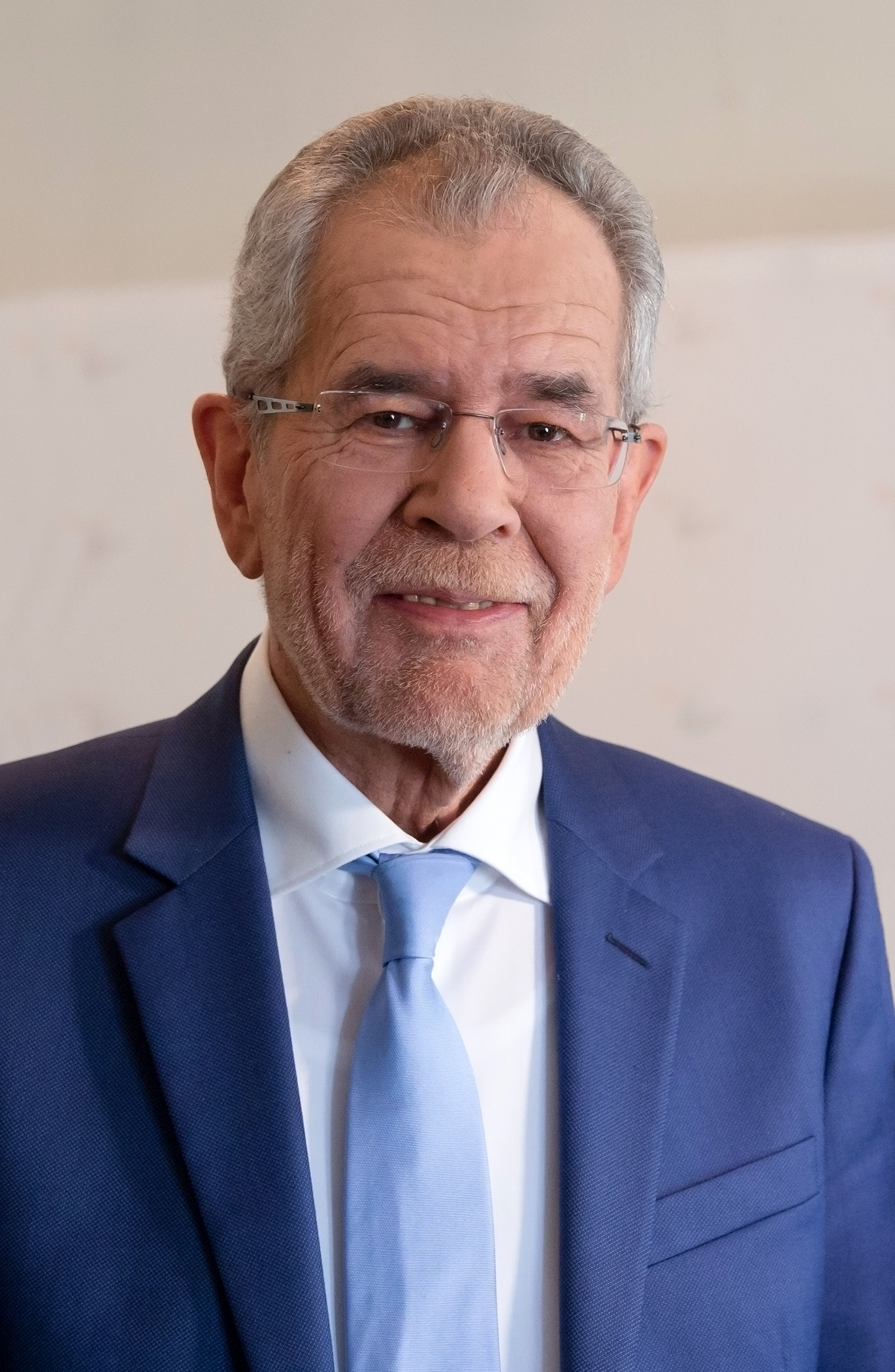

Spokesperson of the Green Party
(1997–2008)

=== Other candidates ===
Independent candidate Irmgard Griss, a former Supreme Court of Justice judge and its president, declared her candidacy on 17 December 2015. She presented her candidacy to the Freedom Party of Austria and NEOS, but both declined to endorse her. NEOS said they would support Griss and any other independent candidates indirectly, and voiced their concerns over the strong partisan politicization of the presidential office and the election campaign. NEOS leader Matthias Strolz stated on 9 February 2016 that NEOS might also support Van der Bellen, voicing his preference for a run-off election between Griss and Van der Bellen.

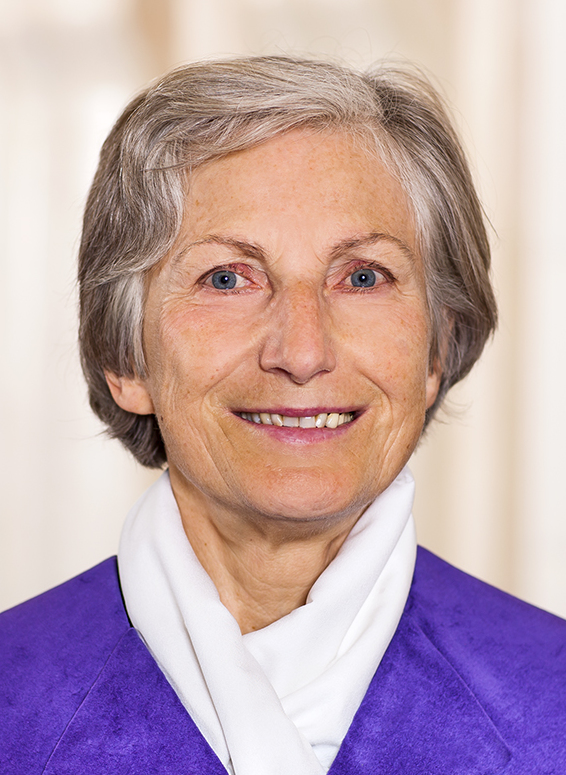
Former President of the Supreme Court Irmgard Griss, Independent

Richard Lugner, society figure, businessman and candidate for president in 1998, was reported to be considering running again, and stated on 8 February 2016 that he would very likely be running. He announced his candidacy on 10 February 2016, citing a poll carried out for him by the Humaninstitut which showed him on 10% (behind Van der Bellen on 27%, Hundstorfer on 18%, Hofer on 17%, Griss at 15% and Khol on 13%).

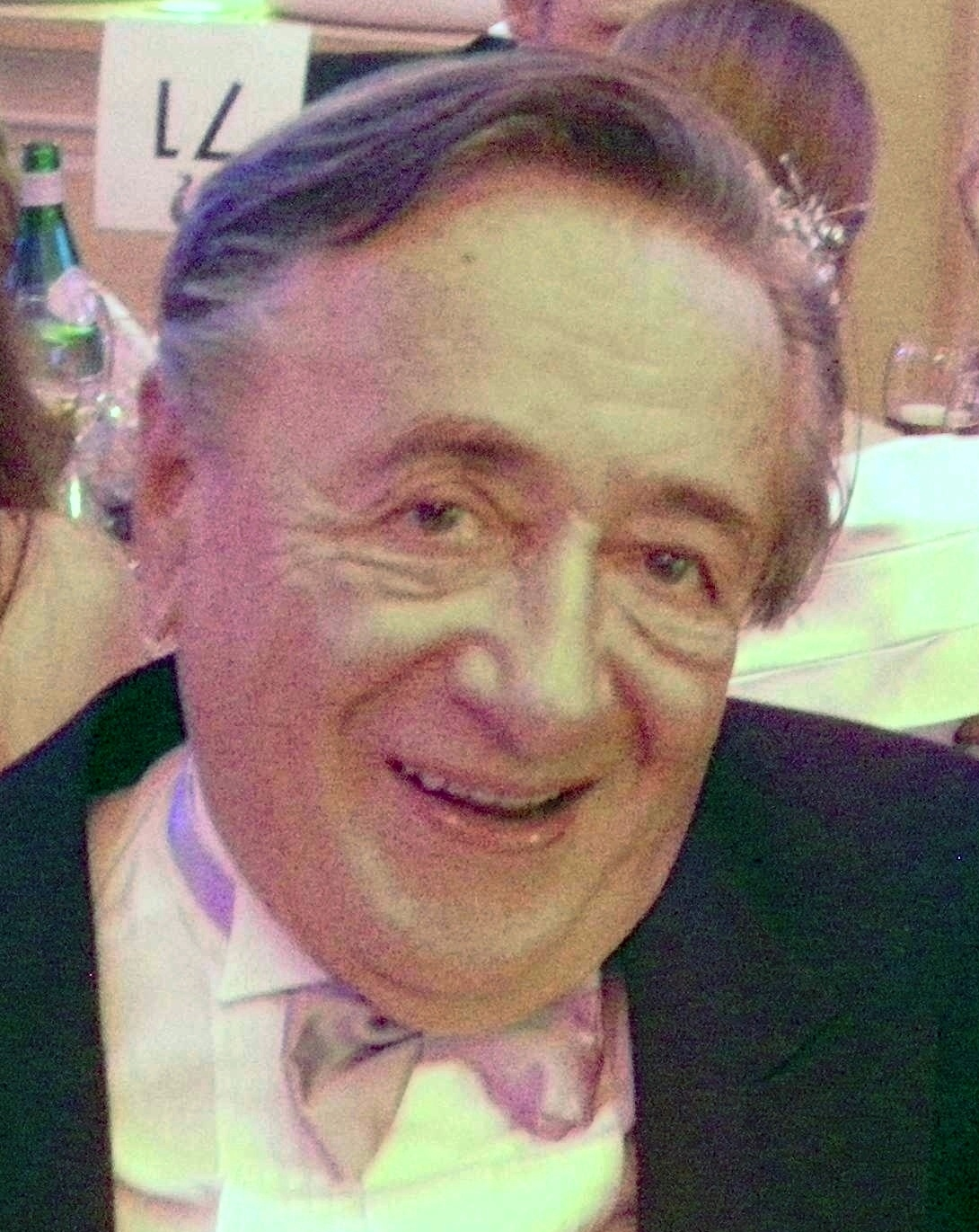
Entrepreneur Richard Lugner, Independent

Martin Wabl, who had attempted to run in 1998, 2004 and 2010, but failed to gather the necessary number of signatures of support, said he would try to run again. Ulrich Habsburg-Lothringen, whose initiative to repeal the so-called Habsburg Paragraph, which had precluded members of the former ruling house from running for president, proved successful in 2011, stated he would like to run for president, but only if a political party decided to support him. Adrien Jean-Pierre Luxemburg-Wellenstein announced on 8 December 2015 he would run for president. Author El Awadalla announced her run on 12 January 2016. Krems activist Franz Stieger announced his candidacy on 13 January 2016. Further independent candidates who announced their runs were Gustav Jobstmann, Thomas Unden, Gernot Pointner, Alois Merz, Georg Zakrajsek of the Interessengemeinschaft Liberales Waffenrecht Österreich, Karin Kolland, Robert Marschall of the EU Exit Party, Thomas Reitmayer of the Austrian version of the satirical political party Die PARTEI, Erich Körner-Lakatos and Peter Fetz.

At the half-way point for collecting signatures, it appeared that only the five major candidates and possibly Lugner and Awadalla had a chance of making the ballot.

== Signatures ==
Griss was the first candidate to submit the necessary number of signatures (6,000) at the Interior Ministry, submitting 7,851 on 8 March 2016. By 11 March 2016, she had collected over 10,000 signatures. By 16 March 2016, two days before the deadline, the five main candidates had submitted their signatures, with Awadalla still having outside chances to make it and Lugner likely to fall short.

Surprising many observers, Marschall announced on 17 March 2016 that he had gathered the required number of signatures, though it was unclear whether he would be using the grace period of three days to reach the required number; Lugner also submitted his bid, but falling short of the required signatures, promising to submit the remaining number within the grace period. Besides these two, only the five main candidates submitted successful bids. On 19 March 2016, it was announced that the five main candidates had submitted the necessary number of signatures, and that neither Lugner nor Marschall had (so far). As expected by many analysts, Lugner claimed on 22 March 2016 to have made up the deficit, with Marschall clearly failing, having gathered only 1,150 signatures.

== Voter statistics ==
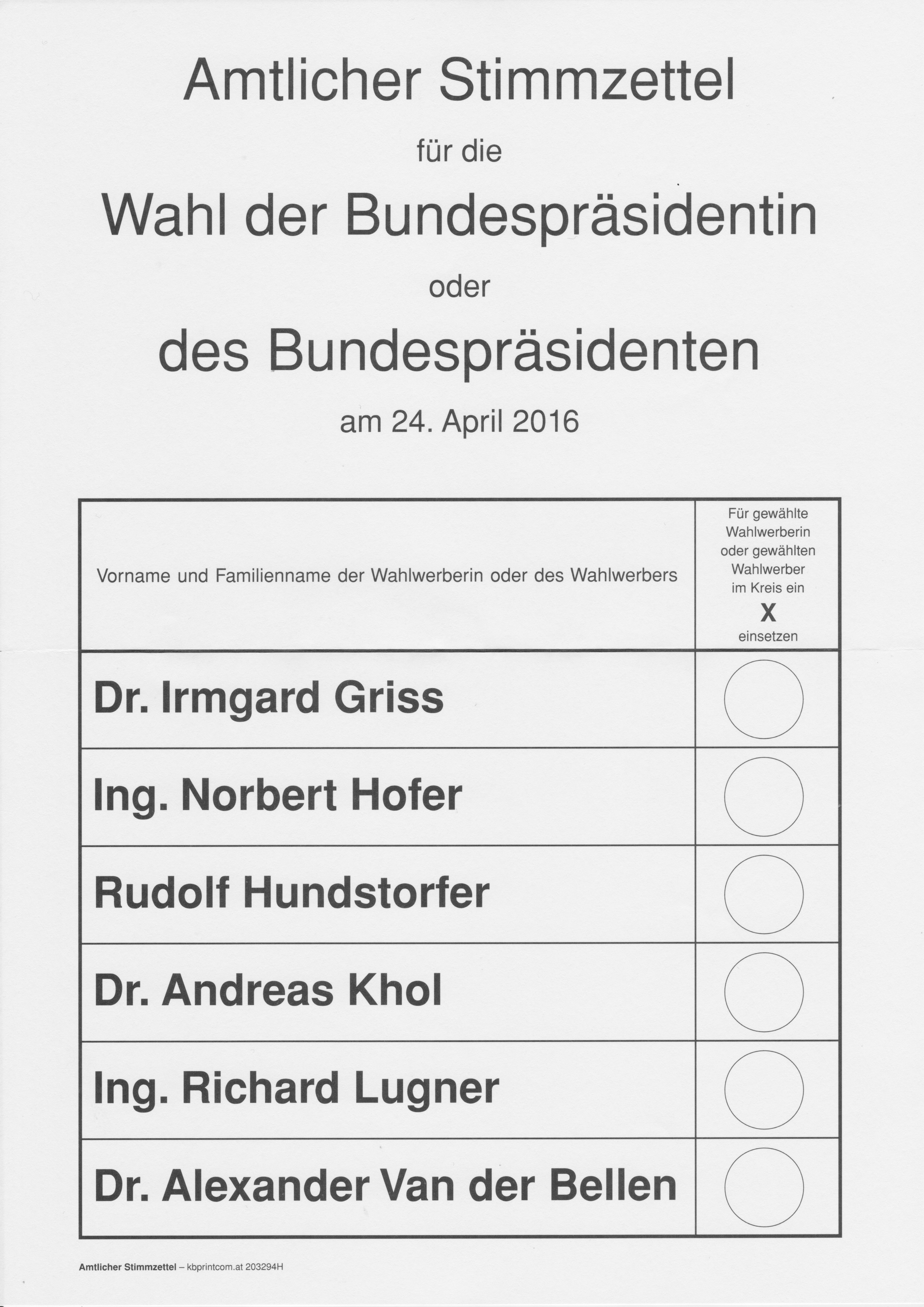
Official ballot paper for the first round of voting

According to the federal election commission, 6,382,507 Austrian citizens aged 16 or over are eligible to vote in the presidential election. Compared with the 2010 presidential election, the number of eligible voters increased by 26,707 – or 0.4% . There are 3,301,628 women and 3,080,879 men eligible to vote. 42,830 Austrians living abroad are also included in these numbers as being eligible to vote. In the first round of voting, 641,975 absentee ballots were issued – up from 373,902 in 2010. For the runoff, a record number of 885,437 absentee ballots were issued.

Eligible voters by state:

- Burgenland: 232,028
- Carinthia: 440,435
- Lower Austria: 1,283,676
- Upper Austria: 1,099,420
- Salzburg: 393,583
- Styria: 969,487
- Tyrol: 540,132
- Vorarlberg: 269,940
- Vienna: 1,153,806

== Endorsements ==
=== Second round candidate endorsements ===
Candidate	First round	Endorsement
Irmgard Griss	18.94%	Alexander Van der Bellen
Rudolf Hundstorfer	11.28%	Alexander Van der Bellen
Andreas Khol	11.12%	No endorsement
Richard Lugner	2.26%	No endorsement

== Results ==
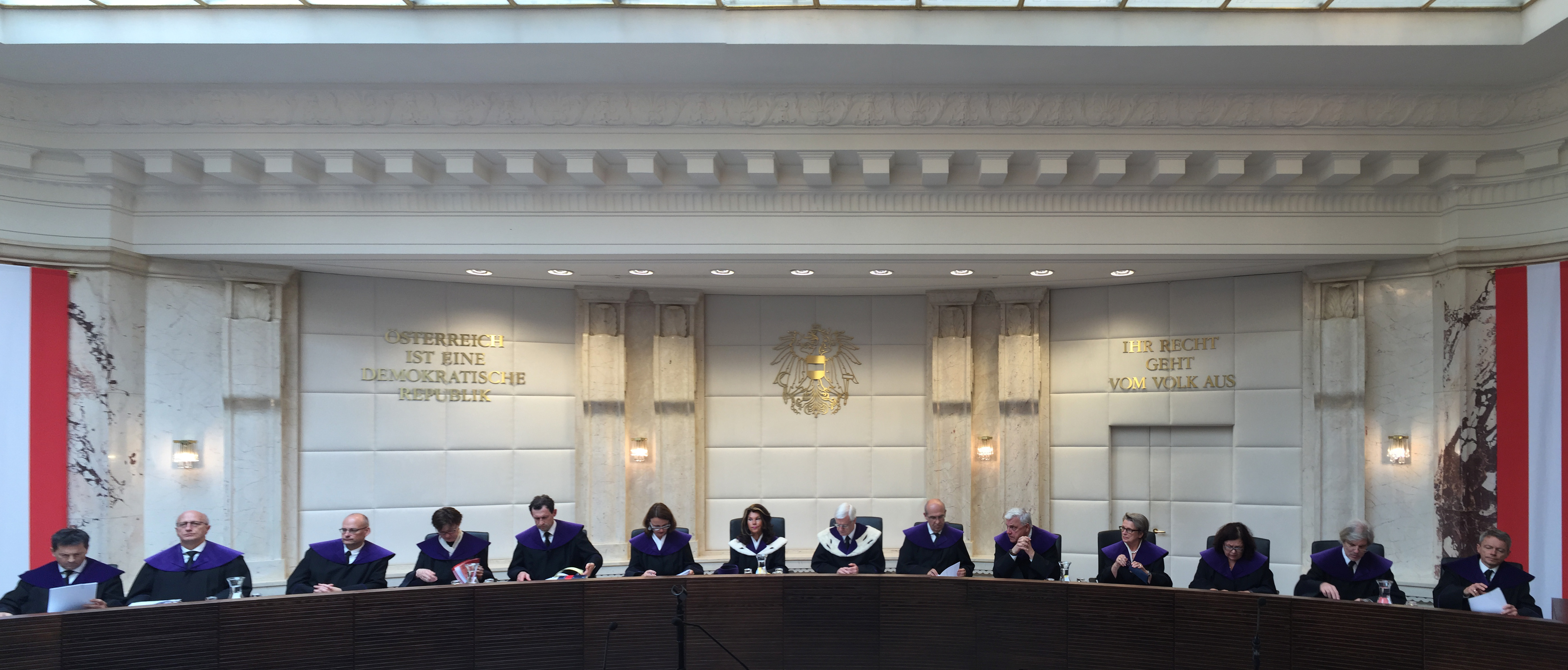
Constitutional Court hearings on the FPÖ's election challenge (20–23 June)

Hofer, the Freedom Party candidate, led in the first round of the election on 24 April with an unexpectedly strong 35 percent of the vote. Van der Bellen came second with 21 percent, and since Hofer failed to gain an absolute majority the election proceeded to a run-off vote between the two, scheduled for 22 May. Independent Irmgard Griss came third with 19 percent, while Khol and Hundstorfer, representing the two governing parties, polled 11 percent each. Johannes Pollak described the result as a "political earthquake" and the Financial Times reported an "historic upset".

The provisional result on 22 May gave Hofer 51.9% of the votes, not counting the absentee ballots, which were likely to favour Van der Bellen. Hence the outcome remained unclear pending the counting of absentee ballots on Monday 23 May. The final result, including absentee ballots, gave Van der Bellen 50.3%. He was to succeed Heinz Fischer as president on 8 July 2016. This was the first time a phenomenon akin to blue shift was widely discussed publicly in an Austrian election.

The Kronen Zeitung reported some election irregularities, such as a 146.9% turnout in Waidhofen an der Ybbs and another impossible result in Linz. According to the head of the Interior Ministry's election department, Robert Stein, the results (which were simply a reporting error) were to be corrected in the official results. FPÖ officials highlighted the discrepancies, but Hofer dismissed any suggestion of electoral fraud.

On 8 June the FPÖ announced that they would contest the outcome in the Constitutional Court. Between 20 and 23 June the Constitutional Court questioned some 90 witnesses, mostly election officials from district election commissions. A ruling by the Constitutional Court was expected before 8 July, determining whether to organize a repeat vote in certain regions. Because of the complexity of the FPÖ's lawsuit, it also had been possible that ruling could come after 8 July. As a consequence, Alexander Van der Bellen's inauguration was to be postponed until a later date.

On 1 July the Constitutional Court declared the second round of the election annulled, requiring a repeat of the election. The three presidents of the National Council (Doris Bures – SPÖ, Karlheinz Kopf – ÖVP, Norbert Hofer – FPÖ) were designated to collectively serve as acting presidents of Austria, starting after President Heinz Fischer's term ended on 8 July and until the inauguration of the new president.

Chart of first-round vote
1. Hofer (35.1%)
2. Van der Bellen (21.3%)
3. Griss (18.9%)
4. Hundstorfer (11.3%)
5. Khol (11.1%)
6. Lugner (2.30%)

Candidate	Party	First round		Second round (annulled)		Second round (re-run)	
Candidate	Party	Votes	%	Votes	%	Votes	%
Norbert Hofer	Freedom Party of Austria	1,499,971	35.05	2,220,654	49.65	2,124,661	46.21
Alexander Van der Bellen	Independent (The Greens)	913,218	21.34	2,251,517	50.35	2,472,892	53.79
Irmgard Griss	Independent	810,641	18.94				
Rudolf Hundstorfer	Social Democratic Party of Austria	482,790	11.28				
Andreas Khol	Austrian People's Party	475,767	11.12				
Richard Lugner	Independent	96,783	2.26				
Total		4,279,170	100.00	4,472,171	100.00	4,597,553	100.00
Valid votes		4,279,170	97.88	4,472,171	96.44	4,597,553	96.80
Invalid/blank votes		92,655	2.12	164,875	3.56	151,851	3.20
Total votes		4,371,825	100.00	4,637,046	100.00	4,749,404	100.00
Registered voters/turnout		6,382,507	68.50	6,382,507	72.65	6,399,572	74.21
Source: Bundesministerium für Inneres

=== First round results by state, district and municipality ===
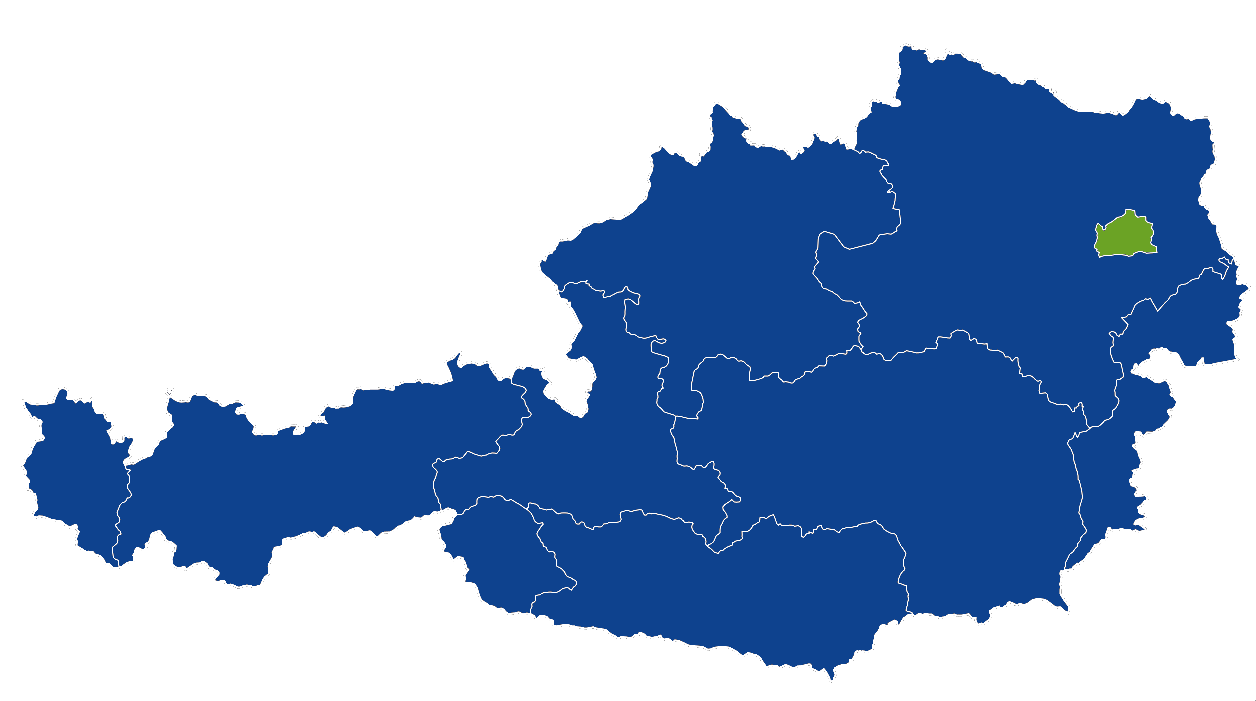
Results of the first round of the election by state (left), district (centre) and municipality (right):

Norbert Hofer
Alexander Van der Bellen
Irmgard Griss
Rudolf Hundstorfer
Andreas Khol

Results by state
State	Griss		Hofer		Hundstorfer		Khol		Lugner		Van der Bellen		Valid votes
State	Votes	%	Votes	%	Votes	%	Votes	%	Votes	%	Votes	%	Total
Burgenland	21,870	12.44	73,676	41.90	30,802	17.52	22,910	13.03	3,317	1.89	23,278	13.24	175,853
Carinthia	65,400	22.92	110,776	38.83	38,714	13.57	19,782	6.93	9,704	3.40	40,934	14.35	285,310
Lower Austria	168,148	17.47	342,568	35.59	114,577	11.90	136,697	14.20	26,064	2.71	174,569	18.13	962,623
Salzburg	47,856	17.97	99,476	37.35	26,200	9.84	35,038	13.15	6,054	2.27	51,735	19.42	266,359
Styria	143,176	21.76	255,552	38.84	67,945	10.33	63,866	9.71	13,511	2.05	113,877	17.31	657,927
Tyrol	59,372	19.24	109,552	35.51	18,796	6.09	38,969	12.63	6,660	2.16	75,190	24.37	308,539
Upper Austria	131,013	17.47	263,487	35.13	88,419	11.79	99,432	13.26	14,259	1.90	153,436	20.46	750,046
Vienna	138,577	19.09	200,933	27.67	91,030	12.54	43,627	6.01	14,131	1.95	237,765	32.75	726,063
Vorarlberg	35,229	24.06	43,951	30.01	6,307	4.31	15,446	10.55	3,083	2.11	42,434	28.98	146,450
Total valid	810,641	18.94	1,499,971	35.05	482,790	11.28	475,767	11.12	96,783	2.26	913,218	21.34	4,279,170

=== Annulled second round results by state, district and municipality ===
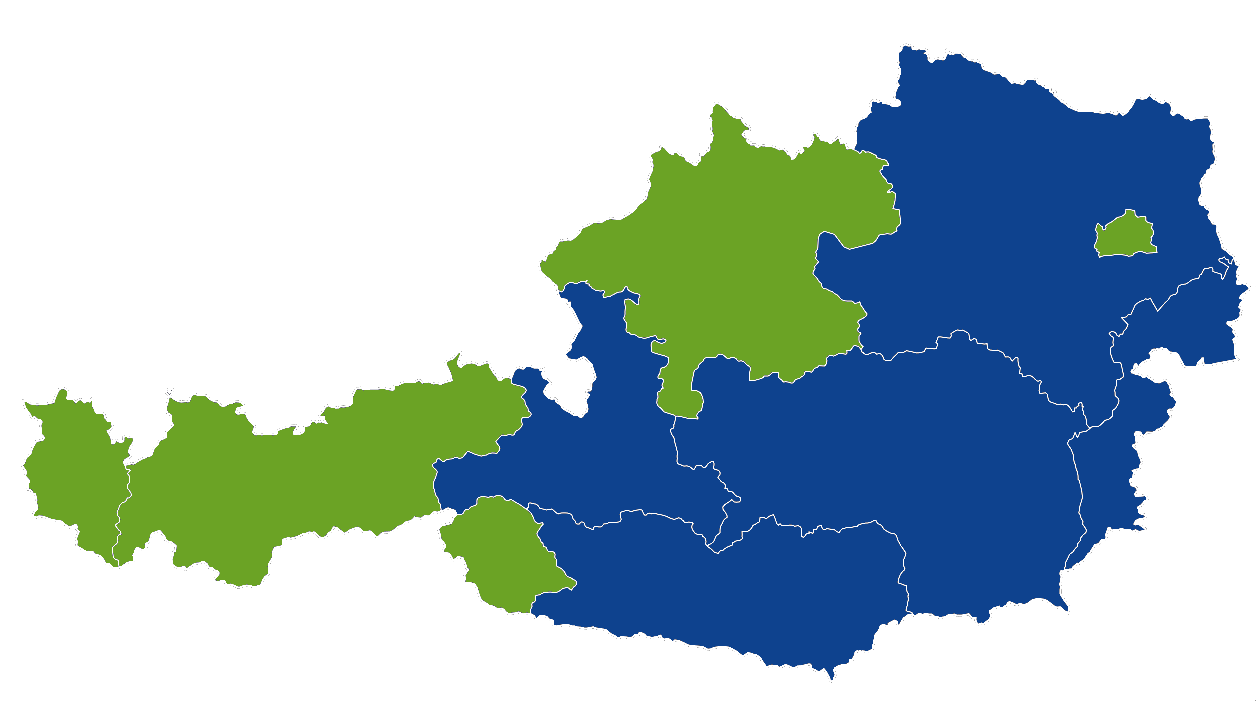
Results of the second round of the election by state (left), district (centre) and municipality (right):
Norbert Hofer
Alexander Van der Bellen

Annulled second round results by state
State	Hofer		Van der Bellen		Valid votes
State	Votes	%	Votes	%	Total
Burgenland	107,128	61.43	67,249	38.57	174,377
Carinthia	169,564	58.10	122,299	41.90	291,863
Lower Austria	511,010	52.65	459,655	47.35	970,665
Salzburg	144,938	52.80	129,569	47.20	274,507
Styria	381,955	56.22	297,400	43.78	679,355
Tyrol	169,587	48.61	179,281	51.39	348,868
Upper Austria	376,647	48.68	397,119	51.32	773,766
Vienna	288,608	36.68	498,168	63.32	786,776
Vorarlberg	71,217	41.41	100,777	58.59	171,994
Total valid	2,220,654	49.65	2,251,517	50.35	4,472,171

=== Second round re-run results by state, district and municipality ===
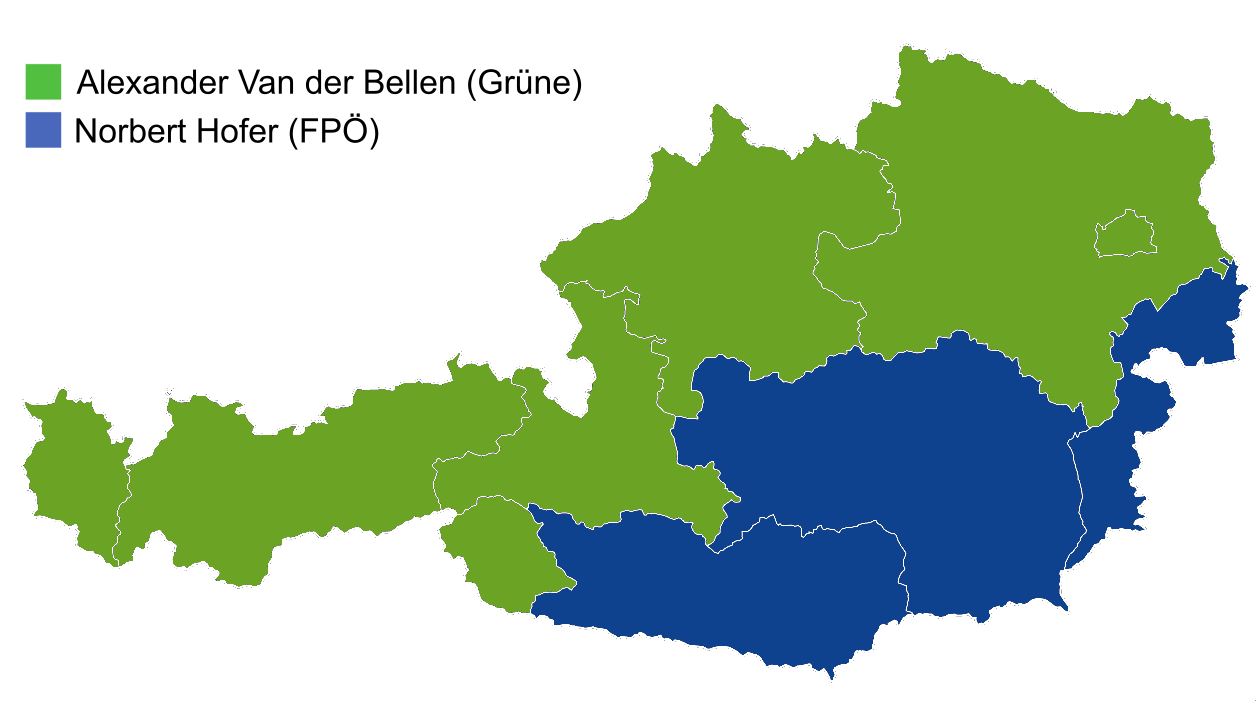
Results of the re-run of the second round of the election by state (left), district (centre) and municipality (right):
Norbert Hofer
Alexander Van der Bellen

Second round re-run results by state
State	Hofer		Van der Bellen		Valid votes
State	Votes	%	Votes	%	Total
Burgenland	102,147	58.13	73,581	41.87	175,728
Carinthia	167,425	54.59	139,276	45.41	306,701
Lower Austria	485,874	49.34	498,849	50.66	984,723
Salzburg	135,483	48.03	146,616	51.97	282,099
Styria	363,778	52.74	325,960	47.26	689,738
Tyrol	166,650	45.31	201,160	54.69	367,810
Upper Austria	356,619	44.73	440,631	55.27	797,250
Vienna	278,894	34.32	533,697	65.68	812,591
Vorarlberg	67,791	37.45	113,122	62.53	180,913
Total valid	2,124,661	46.21	2,472,892	53.79	4,597,553

== Result cancelled ==
On 8 June, FPÖ chairman Heinz-Christian Strache brought a 152-page appeal to the Constitutional Court. Strache claimed that more than 30,000 votes had been prematurely tallied, more than 50,000 votes had been counted by unauthorized personnel. Also, there was a pre-sorting of absentee ballots (500,000 of them) into two batches - void ballots and countable ballots (this is permissible as long as both batches are then re-checked by the commission). Other charges included minors and non-citizens having been allowed to vote. The Austrian Interior Ministry acknowledged some irregularities but said that the number of votes affected was not enough to overturn the results. "There was sloppiness", said Interior Minister Wolfgang Sobotka.

Counsel for Van der Bellen argued that the irregularities would have had only an "insignificant" impact on results, while lawyers for the FPÖ said they could have affected the results of the election. But on 1 July, since Hofer had lost to Van der Bellen by 30,863 votes and the Court found that more than twice that number (77,926) had been affected by breaches of the electoral code, The Constitutional Court ordered that the second round be held again. Noting the irregularities, the Court said in a statement: "It is completely clear to the Constitutional Court that laws regulating an election must be rigorously applied ... This must rule out abuse and manipulations."

Before the Court's ruling, Van der Bellen was scheduled to be sworn in as president on 9 July. Elections were set for 2 October 2016. Until then, outgoing Austrian president Heinz Fischer would be replaced on an interim basis by the three presidents of the National Council, a "National President Council", of which Hofer is the third member. Van der Bellen said that Austrians were "shocked and unsettled" by the Court's ruling, but that he expected to win a second time.

On 12 September the Federal Minister of the Interior, Wolfgang Sobotka, announced that due to faulty glue in the voting envelopes, the rerun of the second round was postponed until 4 December 2016. He also said that Austrian law allowed the election to be postponed only in case of death of a candidate, therefore the decision had to be made by parliament. The delay also allowed for some young Austrians who turned 16 after May to vote in the rerun. FPÖ Chairman Heinz-Christian Strache criticized postponing the elections, claiming it was done by political opponents because Hofer was doing well in the polls.

== See also ==
- List of annulled elections
- Blue shift (politics) an effect observed in the first runoff
