= Lothar Höbelt =

Austrian historian (born 1956)

Lothar Höbelt (born 30 June 1956 in Vienna) is an Austrian historian and who was a professor of Modern History at the University of Vienna, known for his right-wing and nationalist viewpoints. His research areas are political and constitutional history of the 19th and 20th centuries, and the Thirty Years' War. He also lectures at the Theresian Military Academy.

He studied history at the University of Vienna from 1974 to 1981, earning his doctorate Sub auspiciis Praesidentis (Promotion under the auspices of the President, the highest level of academic achievement in Austria). He was affiliated with universities in the United Kingdom and the United States, including the University of Chicago, until he was appointed adjunct Professor of Modern History at the University of Vienna in 1997. He once sympathized with the Freedom Party of Austria, including contributing to their 1997 manifesto. In the 2000s he sympathized more with the Austrian People's Party under the chancellorship of Wolfgang Schüssel. However, he supported the presidential candidacy of Freedom Party politician Barbara Rosenkranz in 2010 and was the head of her supporting committee.

== Controversies ==
He has received some criticism for his right wing views, in particular for choosing to contribute to a Festschrift book for Holocaust denier David Irving, whose works he has characteristed as "historical discussions". In 2019, the Students' Union of the University of Vienna condemned his participation in a conference organised by far-right groups, and there were some calls from left-wing student factions for his dismissal.

== Selected publications ==
- Die britische Appeasement-Politik: Entspannung und Nachrüstung 1937–1939
- Otto Steinwender. Portrait eines Nationalliberalen (Vienna 1992)
- Kornblume und Kaiseradler. Die deutschfreiheitlichen Parteien Altösterreichs 1882–1918 (Vienna 1993)
- 1848. Österreich und die deutsche Revolution (Vienna 1998)
- Von der Vierten Partei zur Dritten Kraft. Die Geschichte des VdU (Graz 1999)
- Defiant Populist. Jörg Haider and the Politics of Austria (West Lafayette, Purdue University Press, 2003)
- Landschaft und Politik im Sudetenland (Vienna 2004)
- Ferdinand III. 1608–1657. Friedenskaiser wider Willen (Graz 2008)
- Franz Joseph I. Der Kaiser und sein Reich. Eine politische Geschichte (Vienna 2009)
- Die Habsburger. Aufstieg und Glanz einer europäischen Dynastie (Stuttgart 2009)
