= Barbara Rosenkranz =

Austrian politician (born 1958)

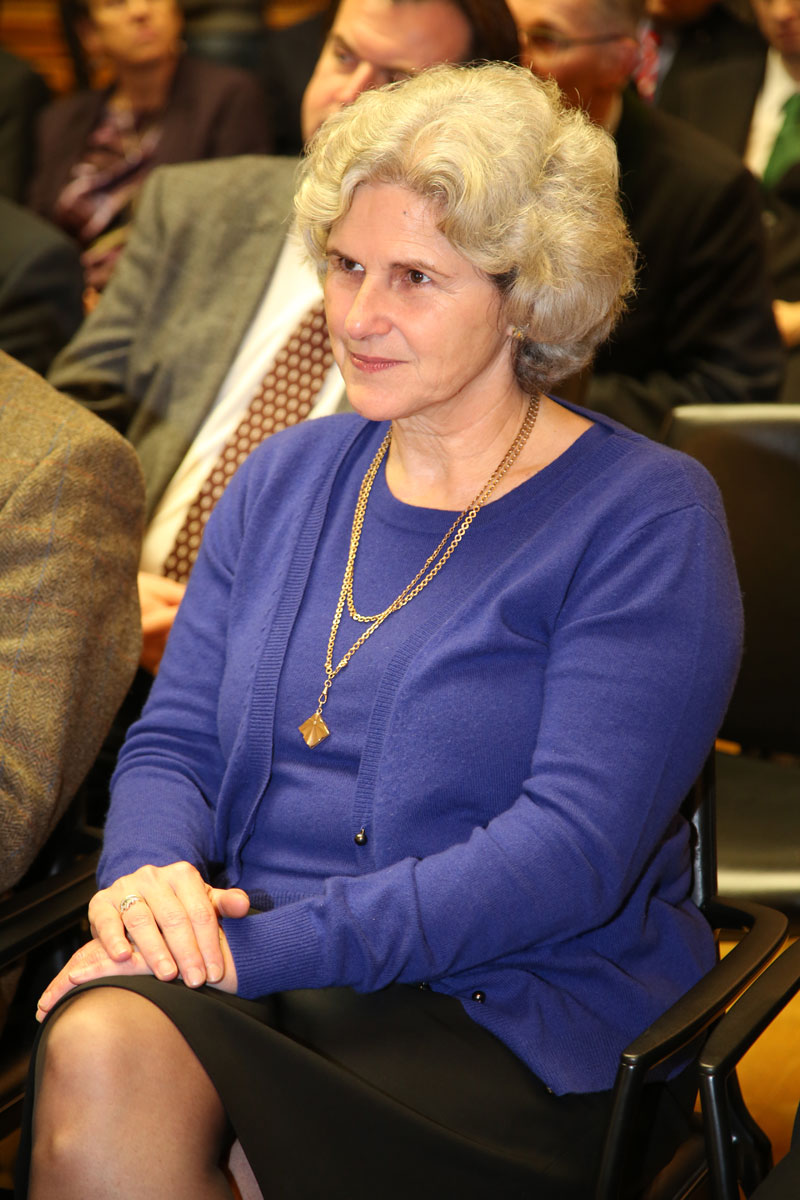

Member of the National Council
- In office 2002–2008
- Incumbent
- Assumed office 2013

Personal details
- Born: 20 June 1958 (age 67)
- Party: Freedom Party of Austria
- Spouse: Horst Rosenkranz
- Children: 10
- Committees: Committees for family, health, interior and education affairs

Barbara Rosenkranz (née Schörghofer; born 20 June 1958 in Salzburg) is an Austrian politician for the Freedom Party of Austria. She was a member of the Parliament of Austria, the National Council, from 2002 to 2008, where she served as Chair of the Committee for Health Affairs. Rosenkranz was the Freedom Party candidate for the Austrian presidential election in 2010. Rosenkranz received 15.62% of the vote, coming second after incumbent Heinz Fischer. Until 2017, she was a member of the Freedom Party of Austria.

== Political career ==
=== Member of parliament and state minister ===
She was elected to the Parliament of Lower Austria in 1993, and chaired her party group from 2000 onwards. In 2002, she was elected to the National Council of Austria, where she served on the committees for family, health, interior and education affairs, and chaired the committee on health affairs. She was her party's top candidate in Lower Austria in the 2008 election. The election was a major success for her party, which more than doubled their representation in the parliament. She resigned as member of the National Council on 9 April 2008, and the following day she was appointed to the cabinet of the state as Minister of Building Law and Animal Protection.

=== Party offices ===
Barbara Rosenkranz was elected deputy chair of her party in the state of Lower Austria in 1996. She was additionally secretary general of the state party 1998-1999, and in 2003, she was elected chair of the state party. Since 2005, she has also been deputy chair of the Freedom Party at the federal level.

=== Candidate for President of Austria ===
Barbara Rosenkranz was the candidate of the Freedom Party for the 2010 Austrian presidential election. Her candidacy was officially presented by the Freedom Party on 2 March 2010. The Kronen Zeitung, the largest newspaper of Austria, supported her candidacy in articles written by its publisher Hans Dichand. The conservative party, the Austrian People's Party, didn't nominate a candidate (their last presidential candidate was Benita Ferrero-Waldner in 2004, who narrowly lost to Heinz Fischer), but refused to endorse any of the two major candidates, incumbent social democrat Heinz Fischer and Barbara Rosenkranz.

Rosenkranz received 15.6% of the vote, coming second after Fischer. A third candidate, Rudolf Gehring of the small Christian Party, polled 6%. The voter turnout was only 53.6%, however (compared to 70.8% in 2004, and the lowest in modern history).

== Political positions ==
A self-described national conservative, she is a controversial and polarizing figure in Austria. She has been a vocal critic of the European Union, immigration, and restrictions to the freedom of speech like the Austrian anti-Nazi laws. She is known for her conservative views on the family and social policy.

=== Russia ===
Rosenkranz supported Russia's annexation of Crimea and its invasion of Ukraine in 2022, and was listed as a recipient of thousands of euros as compensation for her presence at the 2016 Yalta Economic Forum in Russian-occupied Crimea in OCCRP investigation of Russia's International Agency for Current Policy.

=== Social policy ===
Rosenkranz advocates conservative views on immigration, social policy, and the family. She is critical of feminism, and in her book MenschInnen, she argues that gender mainstreaming attempts to create sexless human beings. She advocates equal rights for men and women

She rejects gay marriage and argues marriage is between men and women only.

Barbara Rosenkranz advocates a tough stance on immigration and crime.

=== Views on the European Union ===
Barbara Rosenkranz is critical of the European Union. She advocates a decentralized Europe and nation states. She also advocates reintroducing border controls.

=== Views on Nazism ===
Rosenkranz's husband, Horst Rosenkranz, is a publisher of far right material and was formerly a member of the now-banned National Democratic Party (NDP), a far-right party and the question of whether she shares her husband's beliefs has caused some controversy. Some Austrian media have referred to Rosenkranz as "Reich Mother". In 1995, Rosenkranz brought a defamation case against the publicist Hans-Henning Scharsach for referring to her as an example of a "Kellernazi", that is, a closet sympathizer of National Socialist beliefs. The lawsuit led to a fine against Scharsach's newspaper, "News". This decision was criticized by the European Court of Human Rights; however, as a violation of freedom of speech, as they considered it a matter of opinion, and that Rosenkranz's attitude towards the Nazi past was thoroughly ambiguous. Key points in this ruling were that she had never distanced herself from her husband's activities in the extreme right and that, in the past had been a vocal public opponent of the Verbotsgesetz 1947 law banning Holocaust denial. Both Scharsach and "News" were awarded damages.

When once asked whether she believed in the existence of gas chambers in the Nazi concentration camps during World War II in an interview with Austrian Radio (ORF), she replied that she has the knowledge of an Austrian "who went to school in Austria between 1964 and 1976 -- so that is my knowledge of history and I have no plan whatsoever to change it". As this answer was criticised as being "evasive", she later stated in an interview with Die Presse, that there is no doubt that terrible crimes were committed during the Nazi regime.

Historian Lothar Höbelt, head of the supporting committee for Rosenkranz, criticized the media for a "manipulating campaign" against her and argued that some of these statements were several years old or taken out of context.

== Personal life ==
Barbara Rosenkranz is married to Horst Rosenkranz, and has 10 children, 6 girls and 4 boys. She studied history and philosophy at the University of Vienna, but didn't graduate. Although raised as a Catholic, she has criticised the church authorities in Austria, and left the Church several years ago. None of her children are baptized.

== Honours ==
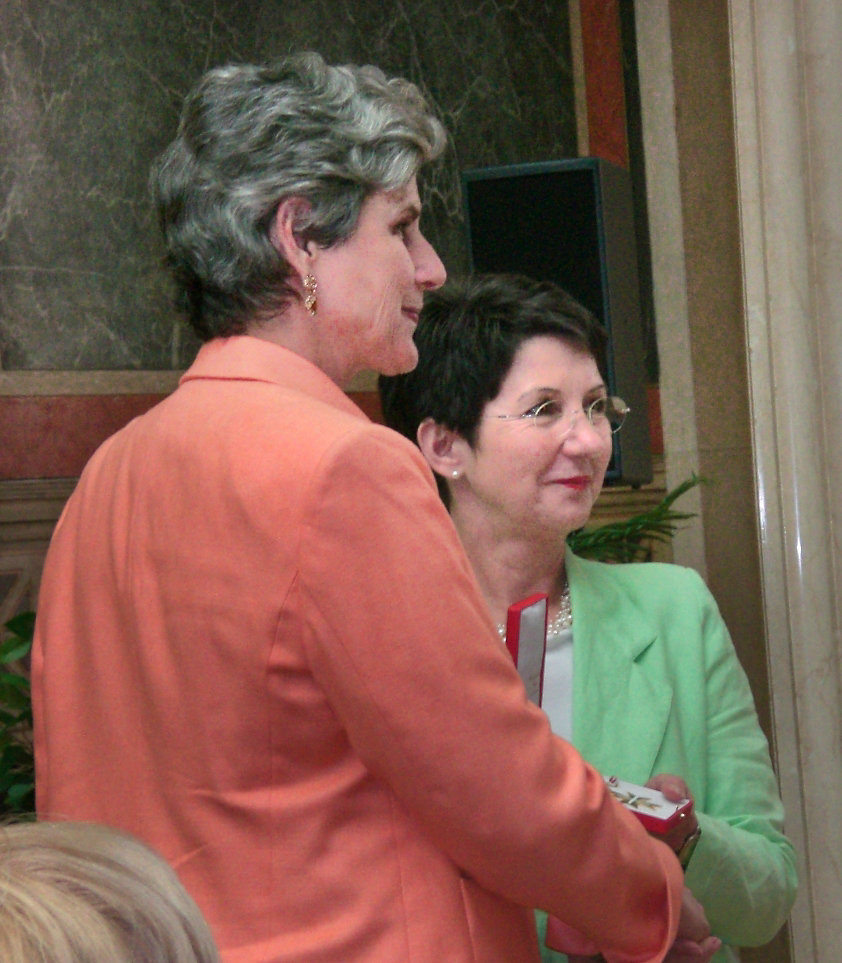
Barbara Rosenkranz is awarded the Grand Decoration in Gold for Services to the Republic of Austria by Barbara Prammer, the President of the National Council of Austria

- Grand Decoration of Honour in Gold for Services to the Republic of Austria (2007)

== Publications ==
- Barbara Rosenkranz: MenschInnen. Gender Mainstreaming – Auf dem Weg zum geschlechtslosen Menschen. Ares Verlag, Graz 2008, ISBN 978-3-902475-53-4.

Political offices
Preceded by	Minister of Building Law and Animal Protection of Lower Austria; 2008–	Succeeded by
Preceded by	Chair of the Committee for Health Affairs of the National Council of Austria –2008	Succeeded by Dagmar Belakowitsch-Jenewein
Preceded by	Member of the National Council of Austria; 2002–2008	Succeeded by
Preceded by	Member of the Parliament of Lower Austria; 1993–2002	Succeeded by
