= Andreas Khol =

Austrian politician (born 1941)

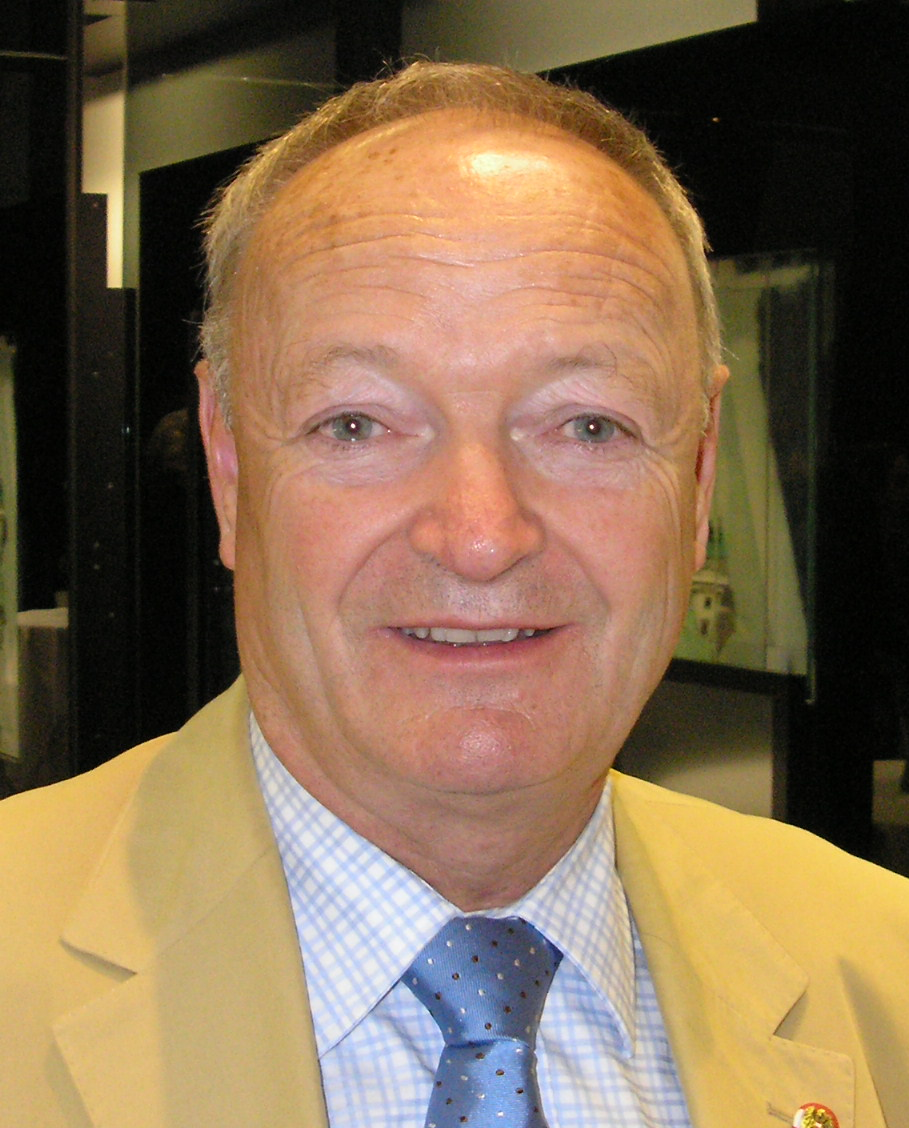
- Khol in 2006

President of the National Council
- In office 20 December 2002 – 30 October 2006
- Preceded by: Heinz Fischer
- Succeeded by: Barbara Prammer

Third President of the National Council
- In office 29 October 1999 – 4 February 2000
- Preceded by: Wilhelm Brauneder
- Succeeded by: Werner Fasslabend

Personal details
- Born: 14 July 1941 (age 85) Bergen auf Rügen, Germany
- Party: Austrian People's Party
- Spouse: Adelheid Khol (m. 1965)
- Children: 6
- Education: University of Innsbruck; University of Vienna

Andreas Khol (born 14 July 1941) is an Austrian politician of the centre-right Austrian People's Party, President of the National Council from 2002 to 2006.

Andreas Khol was born in Bergen auf Rügen, Germany, and raised in the town of Sterzing in South Tyrol, Italy. His family subsequently relocated to Innsbruck, Austria, where Khol attended school (Akademisches Gymnasium Innsbruck) and served as a Boy Scout. Trained as a lawyer, Andreas Khol achieved a habilitation in constitutional law as a student of Felix Ermacora. One of the most senior politicians of his party, he held the position of the first president of the National Council of Austria between 2002 and 2006. Along with former chancellor Wolfgang Schüssel, he held considerable power within the Austrian People's Party. Andreas Khol assumed the post of head of the Senior Citizens Organisation in the Austrian People's Party. He resigned from the post after he accepted the nomination to stand as a candidate for the post of Federal President in 2016. He immediately challenged the government's open-door policy on accepting refugees and managed to bring about a U-turn both in his Party and the Government. Despite this, he came one but last in the presidential race gaining just over 11 percent of the vote and trailing behind the Social Democratic candidate. Internal squabbles in the ÖVP and a lack of engagement by the party machine were cited as reasons as well as a swell in support for the far-right candidate Norbert Hofer (FPÖ) who topped the poll. Visibly shaken on election night, Khol announced he would no longer play an active role in politics.

Khol is proficient in English and French and is the editor of an annual political science book called the Austrian Politics Yearbook.

A member of A.V. Raeto-Bavaria Innsbruck, a Catholic fraternity that belongs to the Cartellverband, Andreas Khol is known to be religious and has often voiced conservative opinions on social policy. He represents the Catholic-conservative wing of his party. His youngest son Julian is an internationally known male model and married to Turkish TV host Nazan Eckes. Andreas Khol has six children, three boys and three girls and 15 grandchildren.

== Honours and awards ==
- 1992 – Austria: Grand Decoration of Honour in Silver of the Order of Merit of the Austrian Republic
- 1998 – Austria: Grand Decoration of Honour in Gold with Star Order of Merit of the Austrian Republic
- France: Officer of the Legion of Honour

Political offices
Preceded by Wilhelm Brauneder	Third President of the National Council; 1999–2000	Succeeded by Werner Fasslabend
Preceded by Heinz Fischer	President of the National Council; 2002–2006	Succeeded by Barbara Prammer
