= Rudolf Hundstorfer =

Austrian politician and trade unionist (1951–2019)

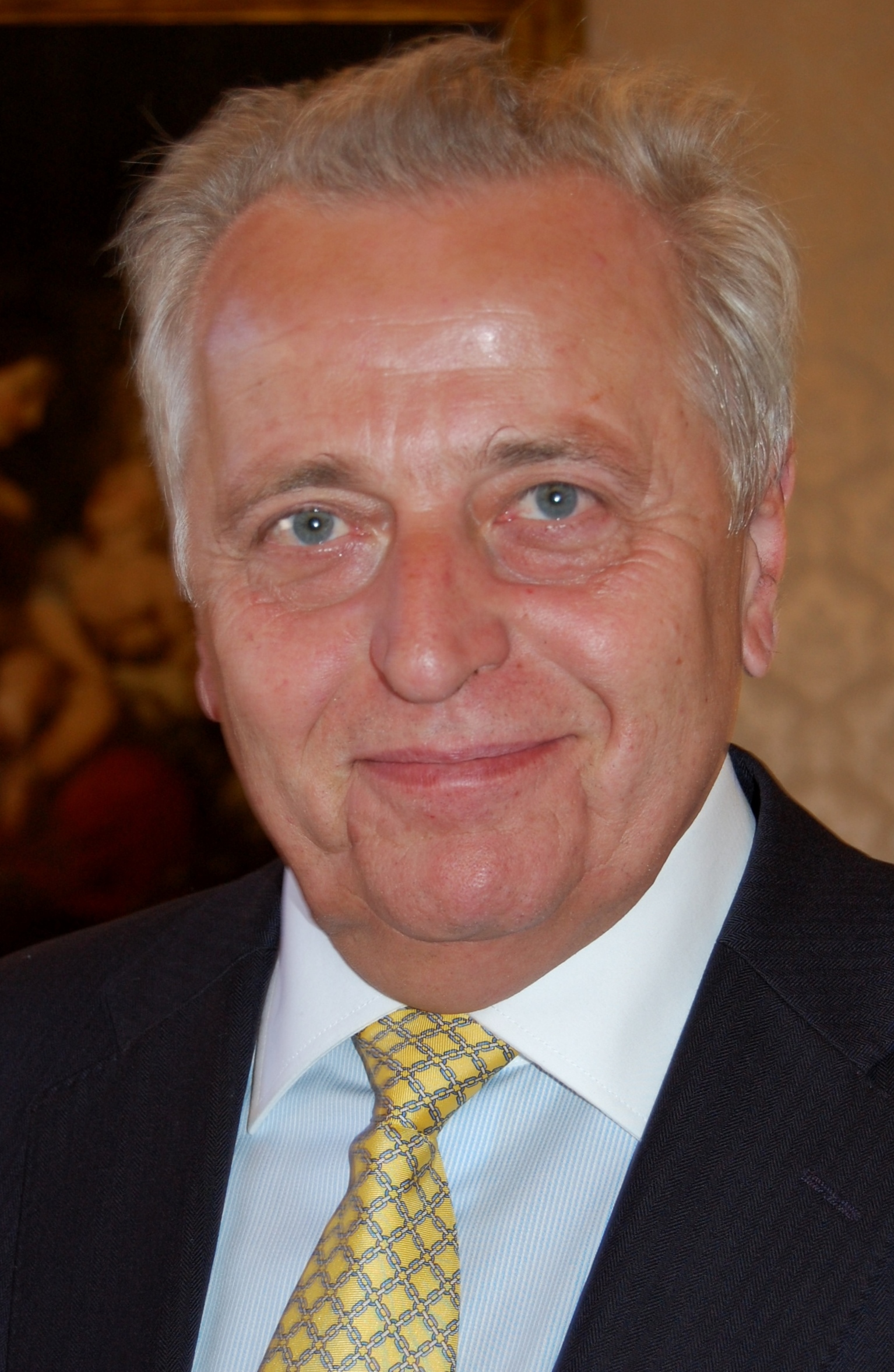

Personal details
- Born: 19 September 1951 Vienna, Austria
- Died: 20 August 2019 (aged 67) Croatia
- Party: Social Democratic Party

Rudolf Hundstorfer (German pronunciation: [ˈʁuːdɔlf ˈhʊntsˌtɔʁfɐ]; 19 September 1951 – 20 August 2019) was an Austrian social democratic politician who served as president of the Austrian Trade Union Federation (ÖGB). Hundstorfer was from December 2008 to January 2016 the Federal Minister for Labour, Social Affairs and Consumer Protection.

Since 1966 Hundstorfer worked as civil servant for the City of Vienna (Magistrat). He graduated from the Bundesgymnasium for professionals in 1976 (Matura). The following year he graduated as an administration official (Beamtenaufstiegsprüfung).

From the early 1970s he was active in the Union of Municipal Employees (GDG), of which he was chairman from May 2003 on.

From 1990 he was a member of the Vienna City Council and the State Parliament, from 1995 also chairman of the local council. After Hundstorfer had been elected President of the ÖGB, he resigned from the Vienna legislature and municipal council on 25 January 2007.

In October 2003 Hundstorfer became Vice President of the Austrian Trade Union Federation. On 27 March 2006 he took over ad interim the ÖGB presidency after the resignation of Fritz Verzetnitsch during the BAWAG affair. He remained president ad interim until the election of his successor Erich Foglar from OGB Board, when Hundstorfer had already been designated to Minister of Social Affairs and Consumer Protection in the First Faymann government.

He was the Social Democratic candidate at the Austrian presidential election, 2016.

Hundstorfer was married and had a daughter and two stepchildren. He was the honorary president of the Anton Proksch Institute and of the Vienna Handball Federation.

He was decorated by the former president of Austria Heinz Fischer with the Grand Gold Decoration with Ribbon for Services to the Republic of Austria.

On 20 August 2019, Hundstorfer died at the age of 67 from a heart attack.

Trade union offices
Preceded by Fritz Verzetnitsch	Acting President of the Austrian Trade Union Federation; 2006–2008	Succeeded by Erich Foglar
