= Christoph Leitl =

Austrian politician (born 1949)

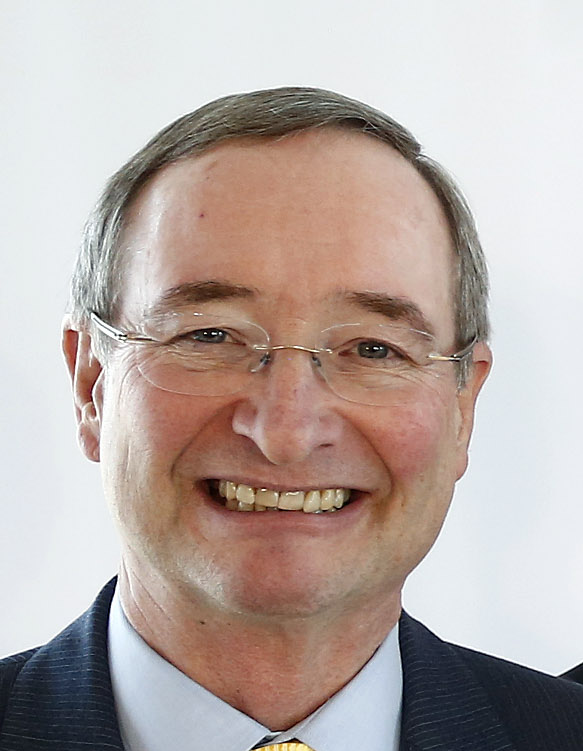
Christoph Leitl

Christoph Leitl (born 29 March 1949 in Linz, Upper Austria) is an Austrian politician. A member of the Austrian People's Party, he is the former president of the Austrian Federal Economic Chamber and president of EUROCHAMBRES since 2018.

== Life ==
Leitl has been married to Erni since 1973 and father of two children. He graduated from the Johannes Kepler University Linz in 1971 with a Magister degree and earned his doctorate in Economic and Social Sciences at the same university in 1973. Leitl served as president of Bauhütte Leitl-Werke Ges.m.b.H., a medium-sized company in the construction materials business owned by his family, from 1977 to 1990.

== Politics ==
Leitl has always been known for his "fervent European perspective". Since the 1960s, he has been politically involved in European youth and entrepreneurs movements.

From 1985 to 1990, Leitl was MP in the Upper Austria state legislature. In 1990, he became minister of Economic Affairs of the same state. From 1995 to 2000, Leitl concurrently served as Vice-Governor of Upper Austria.

Leitl was elected vice-president of the Austrian People's Party branch of Upper Austria in 1990.

In 1999, Leitl won the presidential election of the Österreichischer Wirtschaftsbund, the economic branch of the Austrian People's Party. This cleared the way for Leitl to assume the presidency of the Austrian Federal Economic Chamber in 2000. He was re-elected in 2004 and 2009.

During two election periods, from 2002 to 2005, Leitl also served as president of the European Chambers of Commerce and Industry (EUROCHAMBRES), who named him honorary president in 2006. He was re-elected as president of the same business organization in 2018.

In May 2013, Leitl became an honorary member of SME Europe, the business organization of the European People's Party.
