= Irmgard Griss =

Austrian politician, lawyer and judge

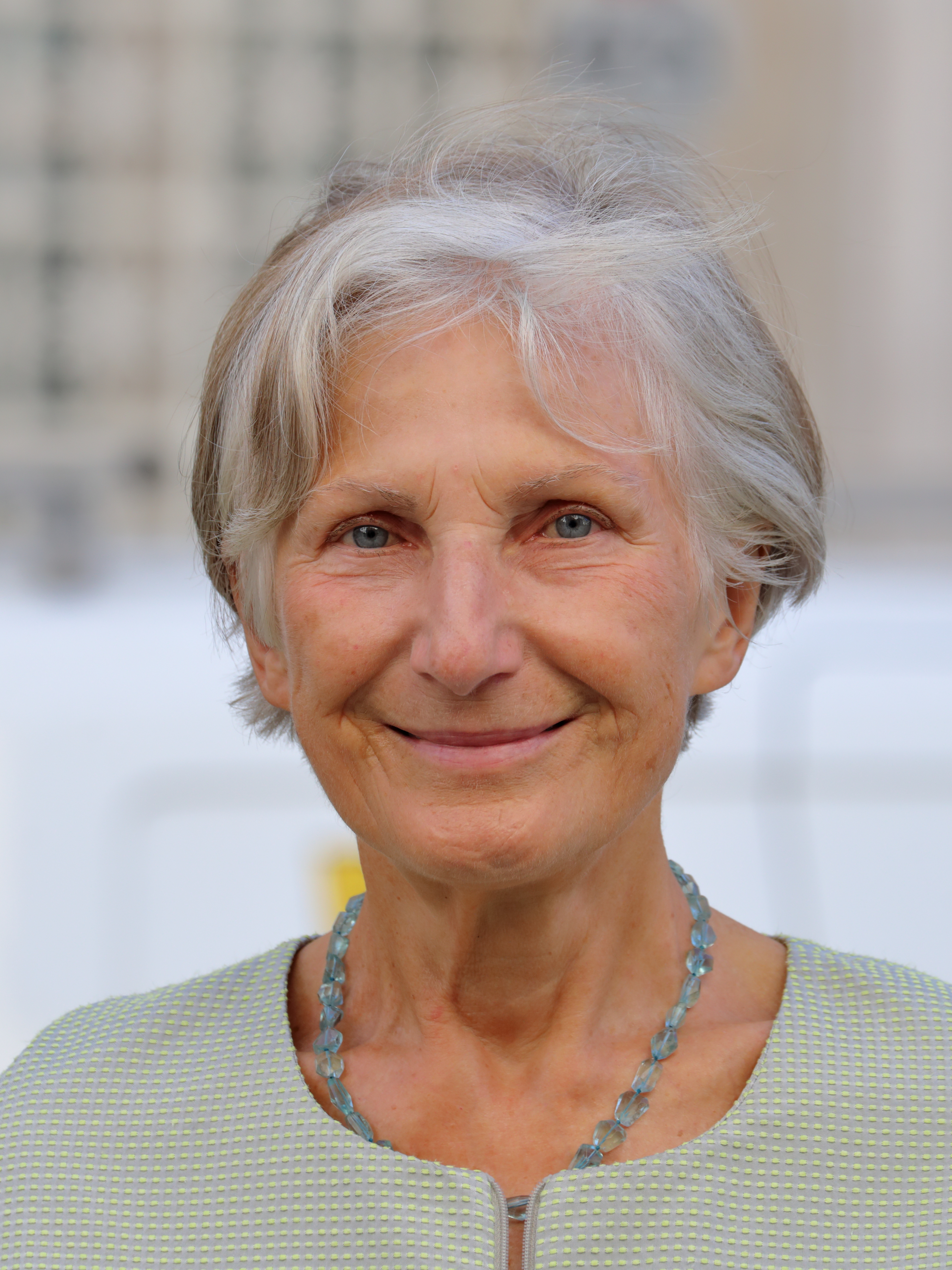
- Griss in 2020

Member to the National Council
- In office 9 November 2017 – 22 October 2019
- Affiliation: NEOS

President of the Supreme Court of Justice
- In office 1 January 2007 – 1 January 2011
- Preceded by: Johann Rzeszut
- Succeeded by: Eckart Ratz

Personal details
- Born: 13 October 1946 (age 79) Deutschlandsberg, Styria, Austria
- Party: NEOS (2017–present)
- Other political affiliations: Independent (before 2017)
- Education: University of Graz; Harvard University

Irmgard Griss, also known as Irmgard Griss-Reiterer (born 13 October 1946), is an Austrian politician, lawyer and judge who served as President of the Supreme Court of Justice from 2007 to 2011. She registered as an independent candidate at the 2016 presidential election and came in third position.

== Education and career ==
Irmgard Griss graduated in 1965 from the trade academy in Graz, and obtained in 1970 the title of dr. juris at the University of Graz. From 1971 to 1975 she was research assistant at the university, while she completed a Master of Laws at Harvard Law School. Griss was in 1978 lawyer in Vienna and from 1979 to 1980 a judge at the county court for commercial matters in Vienna, and from 1981 to 1987 a judge at the trade court in Vienna. From 1987 to 1992 she was a judge at the Court of Appeal (Oberlandesgericht) in Vienna and from 1993 a judge at the Austrian Supreme Court. She was in the period from 2007 to 2011 the Supreme Court president.

Irmgard Griss has been a guest professor at the University of Graz, and from May 2013, a brokerage in consumer affairs. She was in January a judge at the Singapore International Commercial Court.

Irmgard Griss has from 2008 been deputy judge at the Constitutional Court of Austria, nominated by the National Council.

Griss announced her intention to run as an independent candidate for the Austrian presidential election, 2016 on December 17, 2015. After she had publicly stated, that she would not accept any economic support of a political party, she made official her candidacy for President of Austria and kept the possibility open, that some party could later down the line decide to publicly endorse her. She was then invited on two occasions to present her candidacy in form of hearings to the Freedom Party of Austria and to the NEOS. Both of them did later decline her offer. The FPÖ did then soon present their own candidate Norbert Hofer. NEOS said they would support Griss and any other independent candidates indirectly, and voiced their concerns over the strong partisan politicization of the presidential office and the election campaign. NEOS leader Matthias Strolz stated on February 9, 2016 that NEOS might also support Alexander Van der Bellen, the ex-former spokesman of the Austrian Green Party, voicing his preference for a run-off election between Griss and Van der Bellen. Griss received almost 19% of the votes in the first round of the presidential election.

On July 8, 2017 Griss joined an electoral alliance with NEOS for the legislative election on October 15. Even though she's not a member of the party and did not participate in their candidate primaries, she will get the second place on the NEOS list. This was approved by a wide margin among delegates at a party meeting in Vienna.

Legal offices
Preceded by Johann Rzeszut	President of the Supreme Court of Justice; 2007–2011	Succeeded by Eckart Ratz
