= Brigitte Bierlein =

Chancellor of Austria from 2019 to 2020

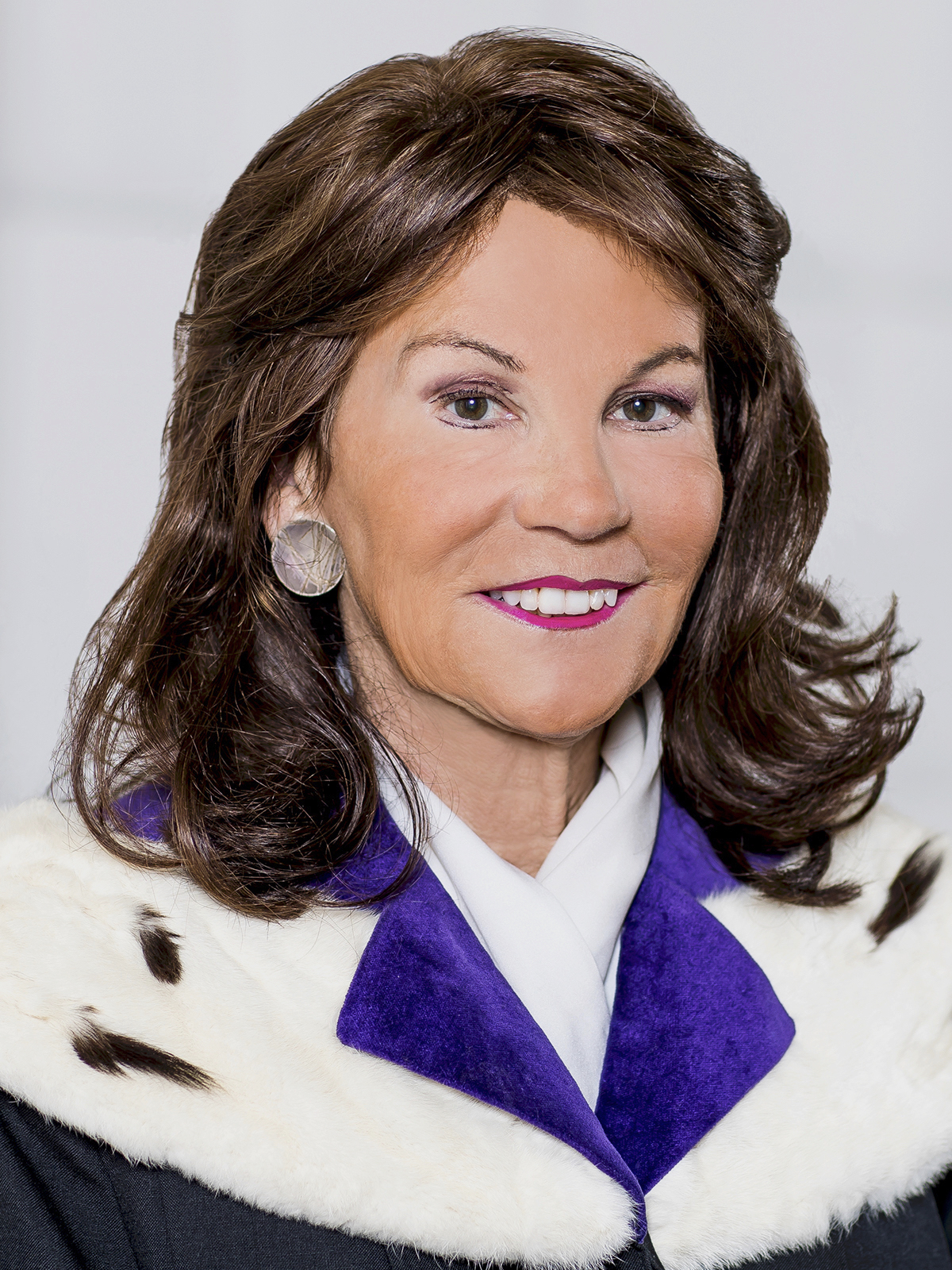
- Bierlein in 2018

Chancellor of Austria
- In office 3 June 2019 – 7 January 2020
- President: Alexander Van der Bellen
- Vice-Chancellor: Clemens Jabloner
- Preceded by: Sebastian Kurz
- Succeeded by: Sebastian Kurz

President of the Constitutional Court
- In office 23 February 2018 – 3 June 2019
- Vice President: Christoph Grabenwarter
- Preceded by: Gerhart Holzinger
- Succeeded by: Christoph Grabenwarter

Vice President of the Constitutional Court
- In office 1 January 2003 – 22 February 2018
- President: Karl Korinek; Gerhart Holzinger
- Preceded by: Karl Korinek
- Succeeded by: Christoph Grabenwarter

Personal details
- Born: 25 June 1949 Vienna, Allied-occupied Austria
- Died: 3 June 2024 (aged 74) Vienna, Austria
- Party: Independent
- Education: University of Vienna
- Website: Parliament website; Constitutional Court

Brigitte Bierlein (Austrian German: [briˈɡɪtɛ ˈbiːɐ̯laɪn]; 25 June 1949 – 3 June 2024) was an Austrian jurist who served as President of the Constitutional Court from 2018 to 2019 and as Chancellor of Austria from 2019 to 2020. An independent, she was the first woman to hold either office.

Bierlein served as the advocate general of the Procurator's Office – essentially the country's chief public prosecutor – from 1990 to 2002, as well as a member of the executive board of the International Association of Prosecutors from 2001 to 2003. In 2003, Bierlein was made a member and the vice president of the Constitutional Court.

Following the Ibiza affair, President Alexander Van der Bellen named Bierlein Chancellor of Austria, after a parliamentary motion of no confidence dismissed the first government of Sebastian Kurz, the first successful motion of no confidence in Austrian modern history. She was the first woman to assume the role, and served until the next government led by Kurz was sworn in, following the legislative election which took place on 29 September 2019.

== Early life ==
Brigitte Bierlein was born on 25 June 1949 in Vienna during the Allied occupation of Austria. Her father was a civil servant. Her mother, trained as an artist, was a homemaker. She was educated at the Gymnasium Kundmanngasse, from which she graduated in 1967. Bierlein originally wanted to study either art or architecture and came close to joining the University of Applied Arts. However, she ultimately chose to study law instead. Bierlein enrolled at the University of Vienna, receiving her doctorate of law in 1971.

== Judicial career ==
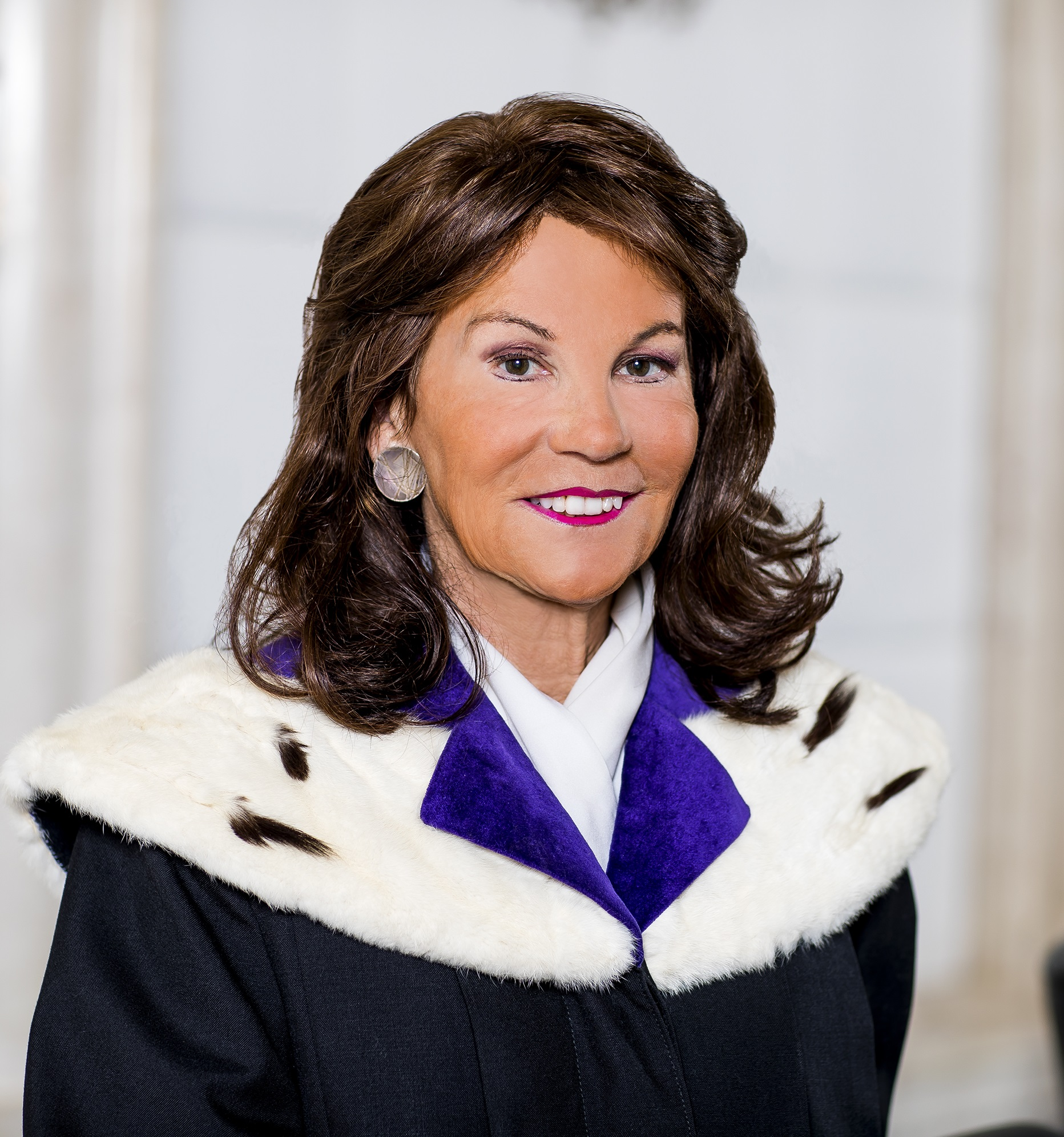
Bierlein's official portrait as President of the Constitutional Court

Bierlein served for four years as a candidate judge, before she was officially elevated to the judiciary in 1975. She spent the next two years presiding over trial courts, first the District Court Innere Stadt (German: Bezirksgericht Innere Stadt Wien) and then the District Tribunal Vienna (Strafbezirksgericht Wien), a criminal court that has since been dissolved.

In the former position, she mostly dealt with cases at tenancy law.

In 1977, Bierlein left the bench to join the Vienna Public Prosecutor's Office (Staatsanwaltschaft Wien). She was responsible for general and political criminal cases as well as for criminal cases pursuant to media law, a type of proceedings customarily handled by dedicated specialists in Austria. In 1986, Bierlein was promoted to the Vienna Chief Public Prosecutor's Office (Oberstaatsanwaltschaft Wien). In 1987, she spent a few months working in the Department of Criminal Law in the Ministry of Justice, then returned to her position in the prosecution service.

In 1990, she was appointed advocate general of the Procurator's Office, the section of the prosecution service attached directly to the Supreme Court. She was the first woman to serve in this position.

The same year, Bierlein became a member of the board of examiners for judges and prosecutors at the Vienna Higher Regional Court, a position she would hold until 2010.

In 1995, Bierlein was appointed to the executive board of the Association of Austrian Prosecutors. From 2001 to 2003, she served as the association's president. Also from 2001 to 2003, she held a seat on the executive board of the International Association of Prosecutors.

In 2002, the first Schüssel government recommended Bierlein for appointment as vice president of the Constitutional Court. The move was not uncontroversial at the time. Bierlein had prosecuted crime with great fervor but had not distinguished herself as a legal scholar; she is in fact considered indifferent as a theorist to this day. Opposition politicians such as Josef Cap accused the government of passing over multiple more competent candidates in favor of a partisan pick. Bierlein supporters such as Maria Fekter countered that Bierlein's appointment would be an important step towards gender equality in Austria.

Assenting to the cabinet's recommendation, President Thomas Klestil appointed Bierlein on 21 November 2002, the appointment to be effective 1 January 2003. Once again, Bierlein was the first woman to serve in the role she was being elevated to. In fact, there had been no women at all on the Constitutional Court until 1995.

Bierlein took over from the president of the court, Gerhart Holzinger, when he retired from the bench effective 31 December 2017.

On the initiative of the Freedom Party, the right-of-center first Kurz government moved to turn her interim position into a permanent one. President Alexander Van der Bellen confirmed Bierlein as the new president of the Constitutional Court on 23 February 2018. Bierlein's previous role as vice president passed on to Supreme Court justice Christoph Grabenwarter. Wolfgang Brandstetter, who had formerly been vice chancellor and minister of justice on a People's Party ticket, was appointed to fill the vacancy of the Court.

Bierlein reached the mandatory retirement age of 70 in 2019.

== Chancellor of Austria (2019–2020) ==
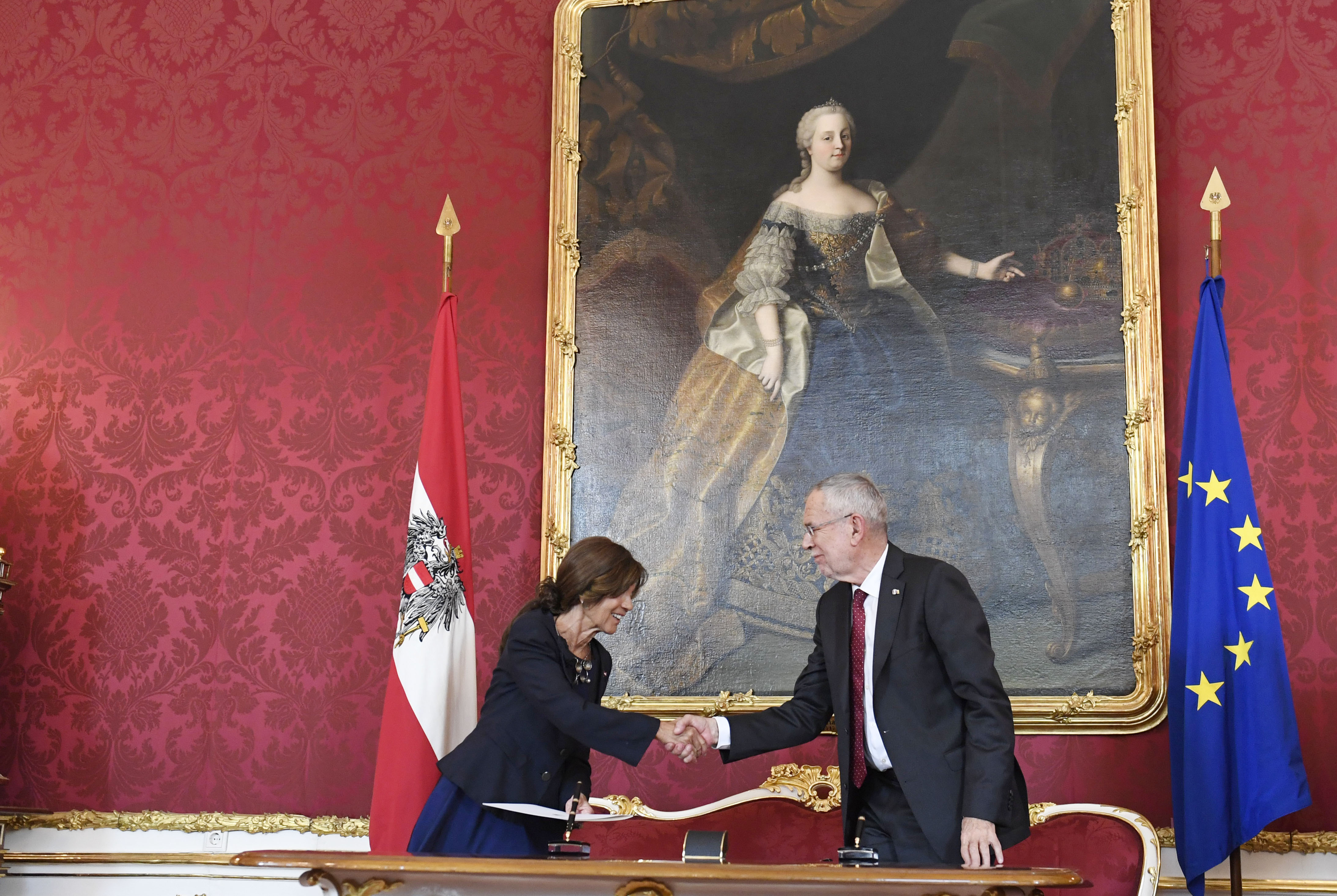
Bierlien being inaugurated as Chancellor, 3 June 2019

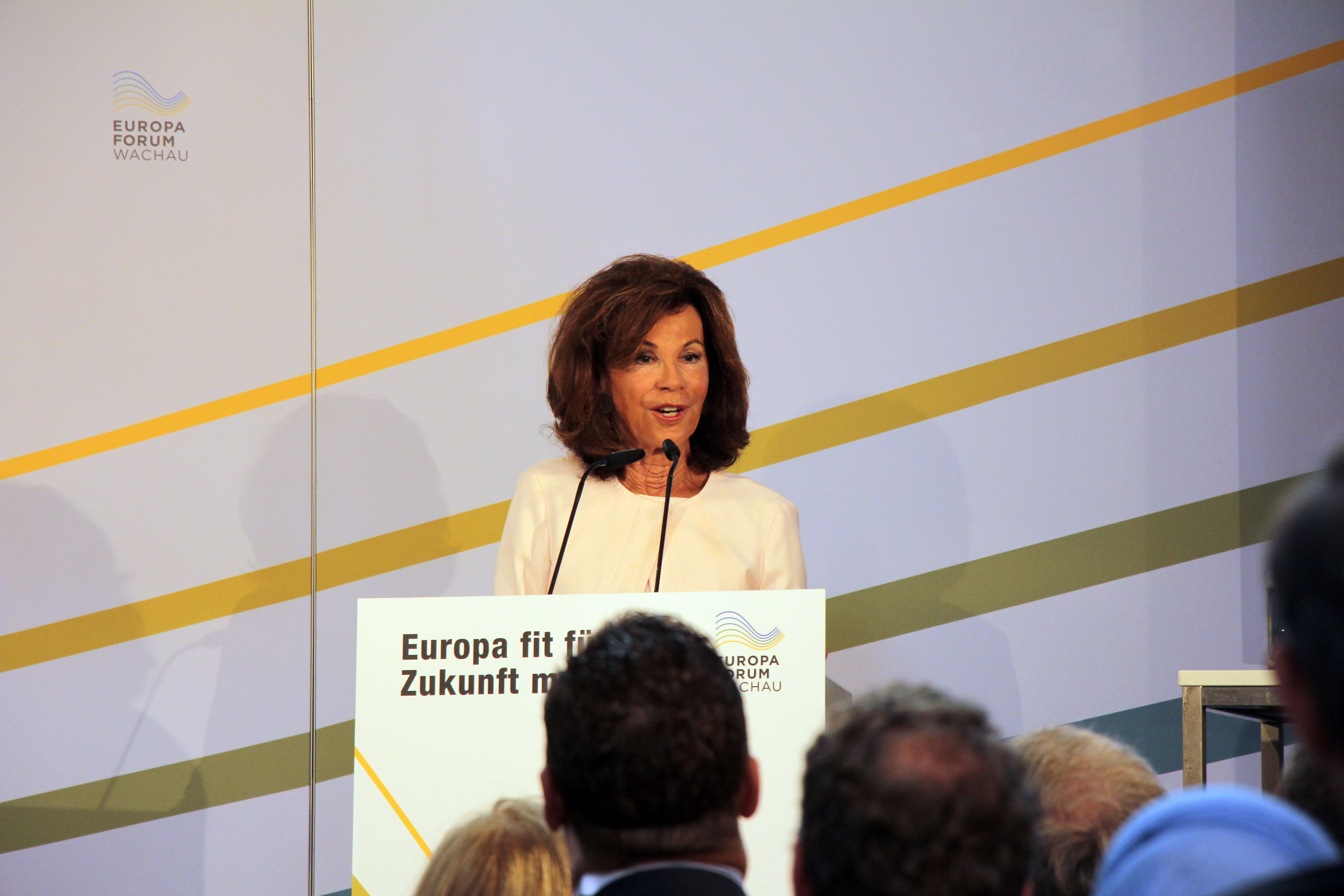
Bierlein at the 2019 Europa-Forum Wachau

Bierlein had no political affiliation. She was seen as solidly right of centre. During her time as a prosecutor, she was noted for her hardline tough-on-crime stance, although her years on the bench have earned her a reputation for civility and for working well with ideological opponents. Commentators from both sides of the political spectrum noted Bierlein's close ties to both People's Party and Freedom Party, as well as the fact that her career owed both its unexpected major breaks to right-of-centre coalition governments.

Bierlein herself acknowledged both her toughness as a prosecutor and her socially conservative bent in general. In response to doubts about her ability to remain above the fray as a Constitutional Court justice, she claimed to be as committed to impartiality as any other professional judge and also pointed out that she had never actually joined any party.

After the first Kurz government lost a parliamentary vote of no-confidence on 27 May 2019 following the Ibiza affair, Alexander Van der Bellen, the president of Austria, named Bierlein as Kurz's successor. She became the first female chancellor of Austria and was in office until the next government was formed following the National Council elections on 29 September 2019. Bierlein's appointment was agreed with all political parties in the National Council.

== Personal life ==
Bierlein was unmarried and had no children. Her long-time partner was Ernest Maurer, a retired judge, who died in 2021. Bierlein was a supporter of the arts. She owned contemporary paintings, although she did not consider herself a collector. She enjoyed skiing and sailing. In June 2020, Bierlein was pulled over on suspicion of driving while intoxicated. She was forced to surrender her driver's licence for four weeks and issued an apology afterwards.

Bierlein died following a brief illness on 3 June 2024, 22 days short of her 75th birthday.

== Honours ==
=== Austrian honours ===
- Grand Decoration of Honor in Silver with Sash of the Decoration of Honour for Services to the Republic of Austria (2005)
- Grand Decoration of Honor in Gold with Sash of the Decoration of Honour for Services to the Republic of Austria (2021)

=== Foreign honours ===
- Grand Cross of the Order of Merit of the Italian Republic (2020)
- Great Cross of Merit of the Order of Merit of the Federal Republic of Germany (2022)

Legal offices
Preceded by Karl Korinek	Vice President of the Constitutional Court; 2003–2018	Succeeded by Christoph Grabenwarter
Preceded by Gerhart Holzinger	President of the Constitutional Court; 2018–2019	Succeeded by Christoph Grabenwarter
Political offices
Preceded by Sebastian Kurz	Chancellor of Austria; 2019–2020	Succeeded by Sebastian Kurz
