= Karl Korinek =

Austrian constitutional scholar and educator (1940-2017)

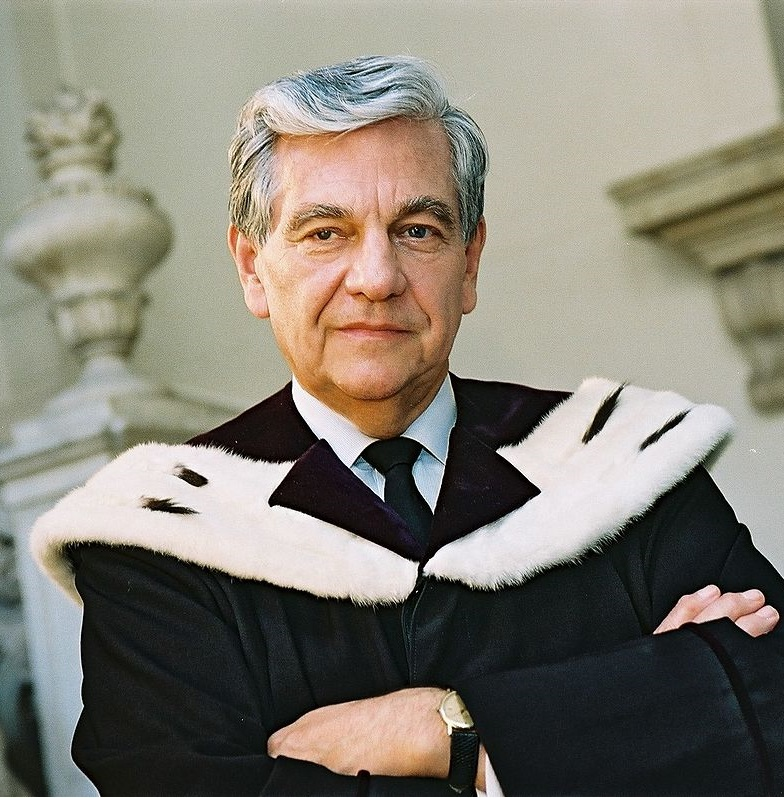

President of the Constitutional Court
- In office 1 January 2003 – 30 April 2008
- Vice President: Brigitte Bierlein
- Preceded by: Ludwig Adamovich Jr.
- Succeeded by: Gerhart Holzinger

Vice President of the Constitutional Court
- In office 1 January 1999 – 31 December 2002
- President: Ludwig Adamovich Jr.
- Preceded by: Karl Piska
- Succeeded by: Brigitte Bierlein

Personal details
- Born: 7 December 1940 Vienna
- Died: 9 March 2017 (aged 76) Vienna
- Party: Austrian People's Party
- Children: 2
- Parents: Franz Korinek (father); Viktoria Korinek (mother)
- Education: University of Vienna

Karl Korinek (7 December 1940 – 9 March 2017) was an Austrian constitutional scholar and educator. Korinek taught law at the University of Graz, the Vienna University of Economics and Business, the University of Vienna, and the University for Continuing Education Krems. In 1978, Korinek was appointed to the Austrian Constitutional Court; he served as the president of the court from 2003 until his retirement in 2008.

Although a member of the Austrian People's Party and an outspoken conservative in private life, Korinek was considered non-partisan in his jurisprudence. He clashed with Wolfgang Schüssel on health care and immigration reform and with Jörg Haider on minority protection matters; he received praise from political opponents for his firm stance on human rights issues in general. Korinek has authored several books and more than 250 scholarly papers. Respected across party boundaries, he is widely regarded as one of the most influential legal scholars in recent Austrian history.

== Early life ==
Karl Korinek was born on 12 December 1940 in Vienna as the son of Franz Korinek, a lawyer and future politician, and his wife Viktoria.

Korinek grew up Catholic. The family was conservative; Korinek's father joined the Austrian People's Party after the end of World War II and went on to become General Secretary of the Austrian Economic Chamber, the national entrepreneurs' and industrialists' advocacy group; he later also served as the minister of finance for a term.

Korinek received his secondary education at the Gymnasium Mariahilf, a school with special emphasis on the classical humanities.

== Career ==
Following his graduation from the gymnasium in 1958, Korinek enrolled at the University of Vienna to study law, receiving his doctorate in 1963. He spent the next year working as a trainee at various Viennese courts. In 1964, he went to work as an in-house legal consultant for the Austrian Economic Chamber. In addition to his day job in the bureaucracy, Korinek continued to pursue an academic career. In 1970, he submitted his habilitation thesis to the Faculty of Legal and Political Science (German: Rechts- und Staatswissenschaften) at the University of Salzburg. In 1973, he left the Chamber to accept an appointment to full professor of public law (öffentliches Recht) at the University of Graz. After three years in Graz, Korinek returned to the capital to become a professor at the Vienna University of Economics and Business, a position he held until he moved on to the University of Vienna in 1995.

Starting in 1997, he also taught at the Danube University Krems.

In addition to his academic commitments, Korinek held a considerable number of extramural positions. From 1986 to 1992, Korinek was president of Austrian Standards International; from 1987 to 2002, he also sat on the board of the Deutsches Institut für Normung. In 1999, he became a member of the board of directors of the Vienna State Opera. He also served on the boards of directors of a number of publicly traded companies and NGOs, most notably the Uniqa Insurance Group and the ERSTE Foundation.

In 1998, he was invited to join the Austrian Academy of Sciences.

In 1978, Korinek was appointed to the Austrian Constitutional Court. He was promoted to vice president of the court in 1999, to president in 2003. Korinek retired from his university positions and from most other responsibilities when he assumed the presidency. He kept his seat on the board of the State Opera, a side job that was particularly dear to him.

In early 2003, the cabinet of then-Chancellor Wolfgang Schüssel launched the Austria Convention (Österreich-Konvent), a conference of legal scholars and public intellectuals tasked with drafting a new constitution for Austria. The existing constitution, exceptionally bulky and difficult to navigate, had been posing serious technical challenges to legislators and constitutional justices for decades. The Convention was charged with exploring reform. Korinek was a member of the Convention from its launch to its conclusion in 2005.

Effective May 2008, Korinek retired from the court, citing health reasons.

Over the course of his career, Korinek wrote several books and more than 250 scholarly articles.

== Death and legacy ==
Korinek died on 9 March 2017 after a protracted struggle with heart disease.

Korinek is acknowledged as having been one of the Constitutional Court's most influential members during his tenure; he may in fact have been one of the court's most influential members in the institution's entire history. Even before he was appointed president of the court, Korinek has had more impact on the court's jurisprudence than would have been typical for a regular member. Commentators credit Korinek with having played a significant role in modernizing the tribunal's jurisprudence on constitutional rights questions; the court itself agrees. Korinek is also credited for the fact that the court, under his leadership, has softened its traditional commitment to judicial restraint and has grown more assertive, protecting human rights principles more energetically and striking down laws more often.

Korinek has also been noted for his impact as an educator. Commentators have called him "one of the greats" of Austrian legal instruction. Korinek is said to have played a prominent role in shaping the minds of several generations of Austrian jurists.

He has been called the "doyen" of Austrian legal scholarship and one of the most distinguished personalities in the country's legal history.

== Politics ==
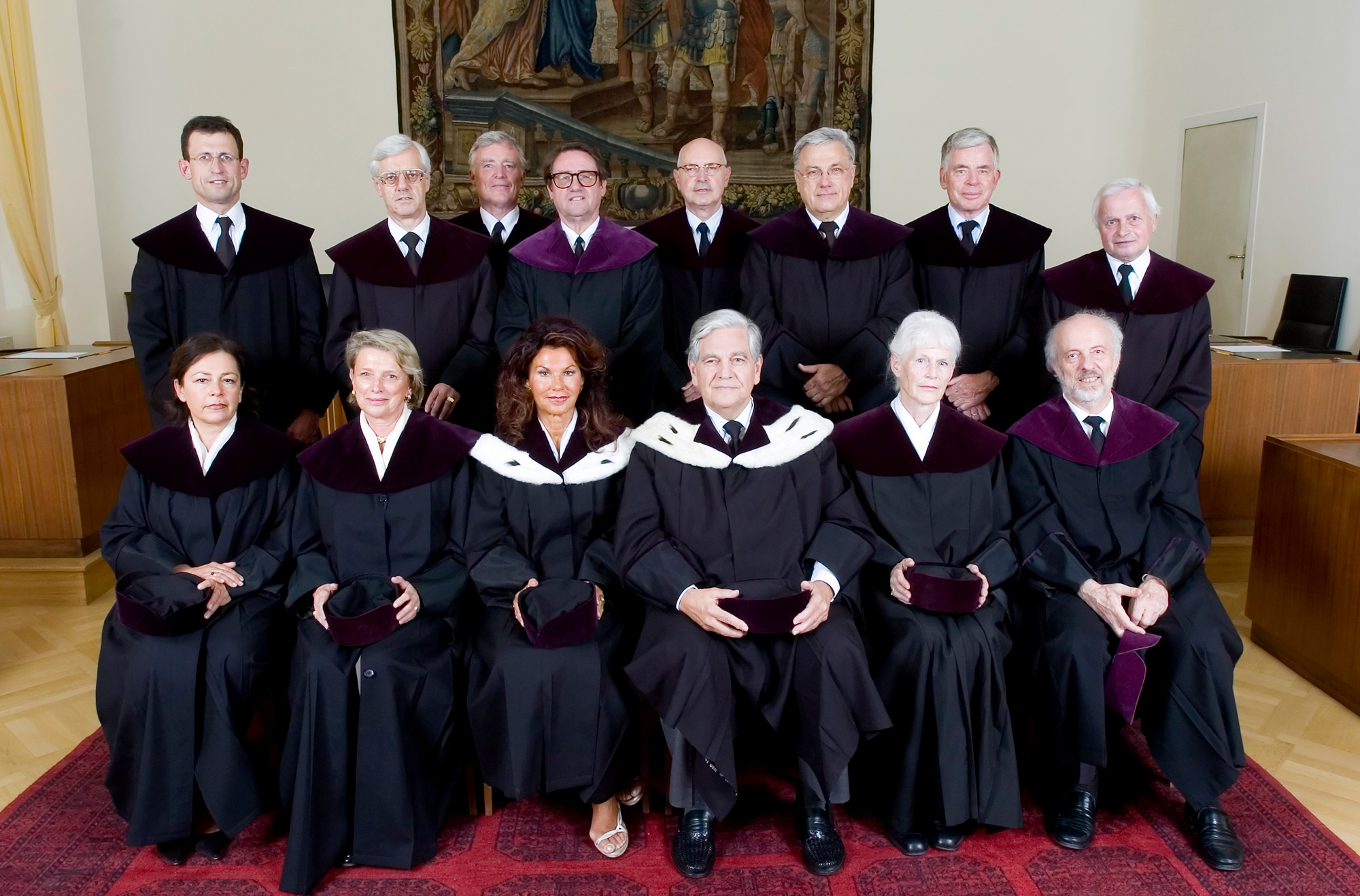
The Austrian Constitutional Court in June 2007; Karl Korinek is seated front row center

Korinek was regarded as a committed conservative. Like his father before him, he joined the Austrian People's Party; he remained a card-carrying supporter when he was appointed to the Constitutional Court and only withdrew from membership when he was promoted to president. He also was a member of the Cartellverband.

Throughout his life, Korinek remained a devout Catholic. He was active in the Vienna Catholic Academy (Wiener katholische Akademie) and in the Association of Catholic Graduates (katholischer Akademikerverband). Korinek credited his Christianity in general and Thomas Aquinas in particular with having materially influenced his legal philosophy.

Korinek's promotion to president of the Constitutional Court was part of an attempt by then-Chancellor Wolfgang Schüssel to move the court to the right. His outspoken conservatism and the circumstances of his promotion nonwithstanding, Korinek quickly acquired a reputation for integrity and non-partisan jurisprudence; he came to be widely respected across party lines. During Korinek's tenure as its president, the Constitutional Court overturned several key pieces of Schüssel's legislative agenda. Also during Korinek's presidency, the court sided with Slovenian minority right activists in the Ortstafelstreit, a long-running dispute about Slovenian language rights that Jörg Haider's Freedom Party had been using to stoke populist resentment. The decision, easily the most controversial in the institution's history, earned Korinek Haider's and the Freedom Party's lasting enmity.

Korinek became known for a number of signature positions that received praise from both sides of the political spectrum. He advocated for transparency in government, called for an overhaul of Austria's outsized and convoluted constitution, and demanded that legislators put craftsmanship before ideology in drafting statutes. He also took a firm stance against government encroachments on constitutional rights. After his retirement, he became a vocal critic of online surveillance, especially of government-mandated online data retention. His criticism of Austria's data retention program proved well founded when, in 2014, the European Court of Justice declared it illegal under European human rights rules.

Korinek supported Andreas Khol in the 2016 Austrian presidential election.

== Personal life ==
Korinek was married for most of his adult life. He was survived by two children.

Korinek was passionate about music. He sang in the Vienna State Opera choir in his student days; he remained involved in State Opera life throughout his career and well into retirement. Starting in 1999, he served on the board of directors of the opera, one of a handful of positions he did not retire from even when he was made the president of the Constitutional Court. Korinek authored books on the relationship between government and the arts, on Joseph Haydn, and on the Der Rosenkavalier, a comic opera by Richard Strauss. In an interview, Korinek compared the work of a legislator to that of a composer: both are striving to combine clarity with harmony, a parallel that Korinek claimed used to be widely discussed and acknowledged in the past.

Korinek also published a book on the life and times of Julius Raab, which became a local bestseller.

== Selected awards ==
- 2000: Knight's Grand Cross of the Order of St. Sylvester
- 2001: Grand Decoration of Honor in Silver with Sash for Services to the Republic of Austria
- 2003: Honorary Doctorate of the University of Salzburg
- 2005: Honorary Doctorate of the Vienna University of Economics and Business
- 2006: Honorary Doctorate of the University of Graz
- 2006: Commander's Cross with Star of the Decoration of Honor for Services to the State of Lower Austria
- 2006: Grand Decoration of Honor in Gold with Star for Services to the State of Styria
- 2006: Grand Decoration of Honor in Gold with Sash for Services to the Republic of Austria
- 2007: Defensor Libertatis Award of the Austrian Big Brother Awards
- 2007: Grand Cross of the Order of Merit of the Federal Republic of Germany with Star and Sash
- 2015: Cardinal Innitzer Award for Scholarly Achievement of the Roman Catholic Archdiocese of Vienna

== Selected publications ==
=== Legal ===
- Korinek, Karl (1970). Wirtschaftliche Selbstverwaltung: eine rechtswissenschaftliche Untersuchung am Beispiel der österreichischen Rechtsordnung. Vienna: Springer.
- — (1971). Verfassungsrechtliche Aspekte der Raumplanung: verfassungsrechtliche und rechtspolitische Gedanken zu Planungsrecht und Eigentumsschutz. Linz: Österreichisches Institut für Mittelstandspolitik.
- —; Müller, Jörg Paul; Schlaich, Klaus (1981). Die Verfassungsgerichtsbarkeit im Gefüge der Staatsfunktionen. Berlin, New York: de Gruyter. ISBN 978-3-11-008614-0.
- — (1982). Grundfragen des Wirtschaftslenkungsrechts. Vienna: Orac. ISBN 3-853-68505-6.
- — (1986). Die Kontrolle wirtschaftlicher Unternehmungen durch den Rechnungshof. Vienna: Orac. ISBN 3-853-68728-8.
- — (1992). Entwicklungstendenzen in der Grundrechtsjudikatur des Verfassungsgerichtshofes: Vortrag, gehalten vor der Niederösterreichischen Juristischen Gesellschaft in St. Pölten am 20. November 1991. Vienna: Orac. ISBN 3-700-70335-X.
- — (1993). Grundlagen staatlicher Privatwirtschaftsverwaltung: verfassungsrechtliche und einfachgesetzliche Rahmenbedingungen nicht hoheitlicher Verwaltung. Graz: Leykam. ISBN 3-701-18965-X.
- —; Holoubek, Michael, eds. (1999). Österreichisches Bundesverfassungsrecht: Textsammlung und Kommentar. Vienna: Springer. ISBN 3-211-83222-X.
- — (2000). Grundrechte und Verfassungsgerichtsbarkeit. Vienna: Springer. ISBN 3-211-83568-7.

=== Other ===
- Korinek, Karl (2005). Der Onkel Julius oder Der Wiederaufbau Österreichs in Anekdoten. Vienna: Manz. ISBN 3-214-00645-2.
- — (2006). Staat und Kunst. Paderborn: Schöningh. ISBN 3-506-72958-6.
- — (2009). Joseph Haydn - Erneuerung und Vollendung: eine Annäherung in fünf Essays. Vienna: Manz. ISBN 978-3-214-00694-5.
- — (2012). Der Rosenkavalier. Eine wienerische Maskerad' - und weiter nichts?. Vienna: Manz. ISBN 978-3-214-00691-4.
