= List of vice presidents of the Constitutional Court (Austria) =

Vice President of the Constitutional Court
- Vizepräsident des Verfassungsgerichtshofs
- Coat of Arms

- Logo of the Court

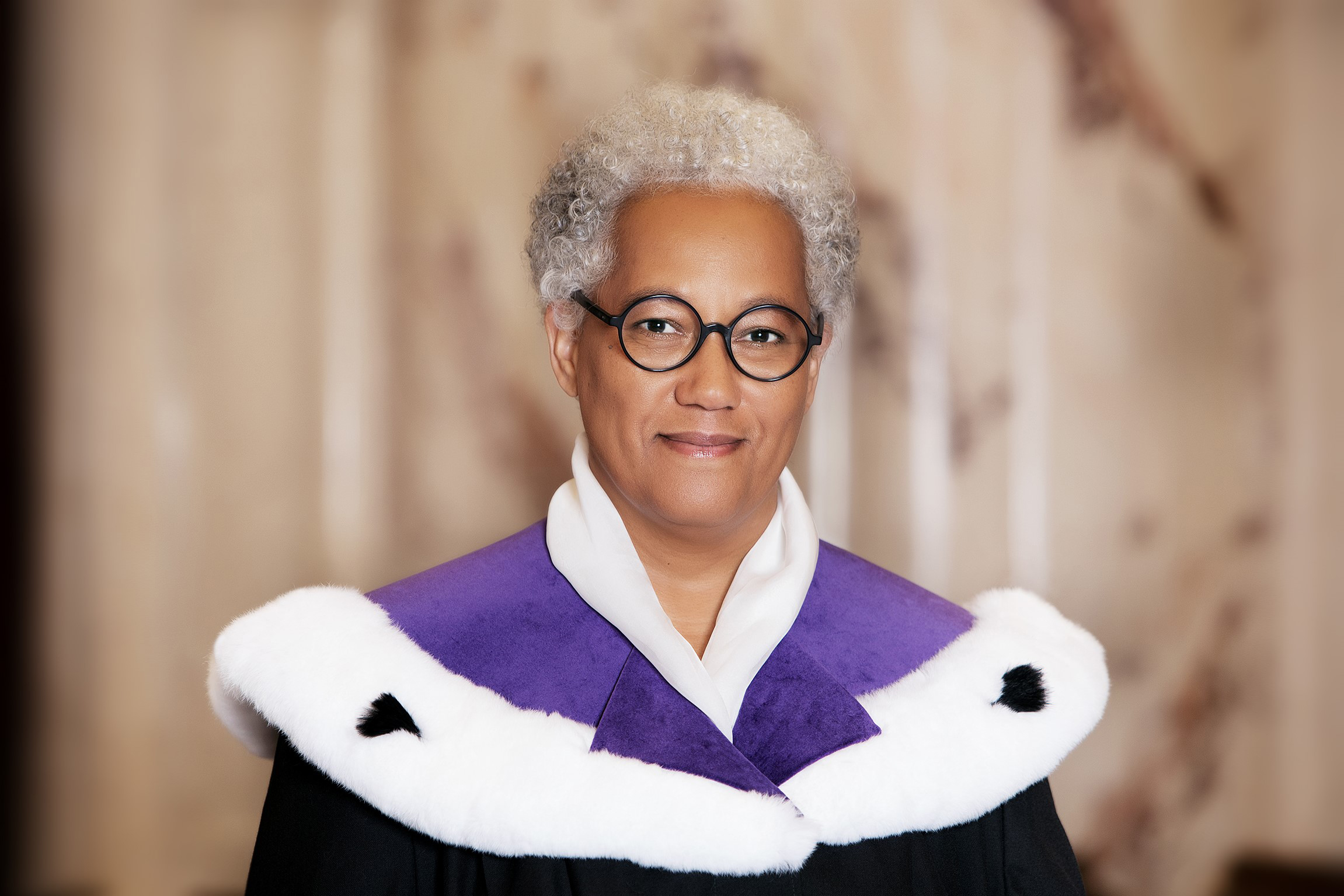
- Incumbent; Verena Madner since 24 April 2020
- Austrian Constitutional Court
- Style: Ms. Vice President (when addressed in court)
- Status: Deputy head and presiding judge of a court
- Member of: Constitutional Court
- Seat: Innere Stadt, Vienna
- Appointer: The Government sworn in by the President
- Term length: Up to the age of 70
- Constituting instrument: Constitution of Austria
- First holder: Adolf Menzel
- Website: vfgh.gv.at

This is a list of vice presidents of the Constitutional Court (German: Vizepräsident des Verfassungsgerichtshofs) of Austria. The vice president of the Constitutional Court is the principal deputy to the president. He becomes the acting head of the court if the president resigns, dies or is dismissed.

== List of officeholders ==
Portrait	Name	Took office	Left office	Notes
	Adolf Menzel	1919	1930	
Constitutional Court disbanded from 1934 to 1945
	Ludwig Adamovich senior	1945	1946	
	Gustav Zigeuner	1946	1956	
	Karl Wolff	1958	1960	
	Walter Antoniolli	1957	1958	
	Anton Mahnig	1961	1969	
	Leopold Werner	1969	1975	
	Kurt Ringhofer	1976	1993	
	Karl Piska	1993	1998	
	Karl Korinek	1 January 1999	31 December 2002	
	Brigitte Bierlein	1 January 2003	22 February 2018	
	Christoph Grabenwarter	23 February 2018	19 February 2020	
	Verena Madner	24 April 2020	Present	

== See also ==
- Judiciary of Austria
- History of Austria
- Politics of Austria
- Supreme Court of Justice (Austria)
