= List of presidents of the Constitutional Court (Austria) =

President of the Constitutional Court
- Präsident des Verfassungsgerichtshofs
- Coat of arms

- Logo of the Court
- Incumbent; Christoph Grabenwarter since 19 February 2020
- Austrian Constitutional Court
- Style: Mister President (normal); Your Honor (within court)
- Type: Presiding judge
- Status: Supreme executive organ
- Seat: Seat of the Constitutional Court; Innere Stadt, Vienna
- Appointer: The Cabinet sworn in by the President
- Term length: Up to the age of 70
- Constituting instrument: Constitution of Austria
- First holder: Paul Vittorelli
- Deputy: Vice President of the Constitutional Court
- Website: vfgh.gv.at

This is a list of presidents of the Constitutional Court (German: Präsident des Verfassungsgerichtshofs) of Austria. The president of the Constitutional Court is the head and presiding judge of the Austrian Constitutional Court.

== List of officeholders ==
	Name	Took office	Left office	Time in office	Notes
Paul Vittorelli	Paul Vittorelli	14 February 1919	15 February 1930	11 years, 1 day	President of the provisional Constitutional Court
Ernst Durig	Ernst Durig	16 February 1930	14 July 1934	4 years, 148 days	President of the "depoliticized" Constitutional Court
Constitutional Court disbanded from 1934 to 1945
Ernst Durig	Ernst Durig	14 December 1945	17 June 1946	185 days	President of the provisional Constitutional Court
Gustav Zigeuner	Gustav Zigeuner	1 February 1956	31 December 1957	1 year, 333 days	.
Ludwig Adamovich senior	Ludwig Adamovich senior	12 February 1958	3 October 1977	19 years, 233 days	.
Walter Antoniolli	Walter Antoniolli	12 February 1958	3 October 1977	19 years, 233 days	.
Erwin Melichar	Erwin Melichar	10 October 1977	31 December 1983	6 years, 82 days	.
Ludwig Karl Adamovich	Ludwig Karl Adamovich (1932–2024)	1 January 1984	31 December 2002	18 years, 364 days	.
Karl Korinek	Karl Korinek (1940–2017)	1 January 2003	30 April 2008	5 years, 120 days	.
Gerhart Holzinger	Gerhart Holzinger (born 1947)	1 May 2008	31 December 2017	8 years, 245 days	.
Brigitte Bierlein	Brigitte Bierlein (1949–2024)	23 February 2018	3 June 2019	1 year, 100 days	Advocate General of the Procurator's Office; Vice-President of the Constitutional Court
Christoph Grabenwarter	Christoph Grabenwarter (born 1966)	19 February 2020		6 years, 200 days	Vice-President of the Constitutional Court

== See also ==
- Judiciary of Austria
- History of Austria
- Politics of Austria
- Supreme Court of Justice (Austria)
