= Christoph Grabenwarter =

Austrian legal scholar and professor

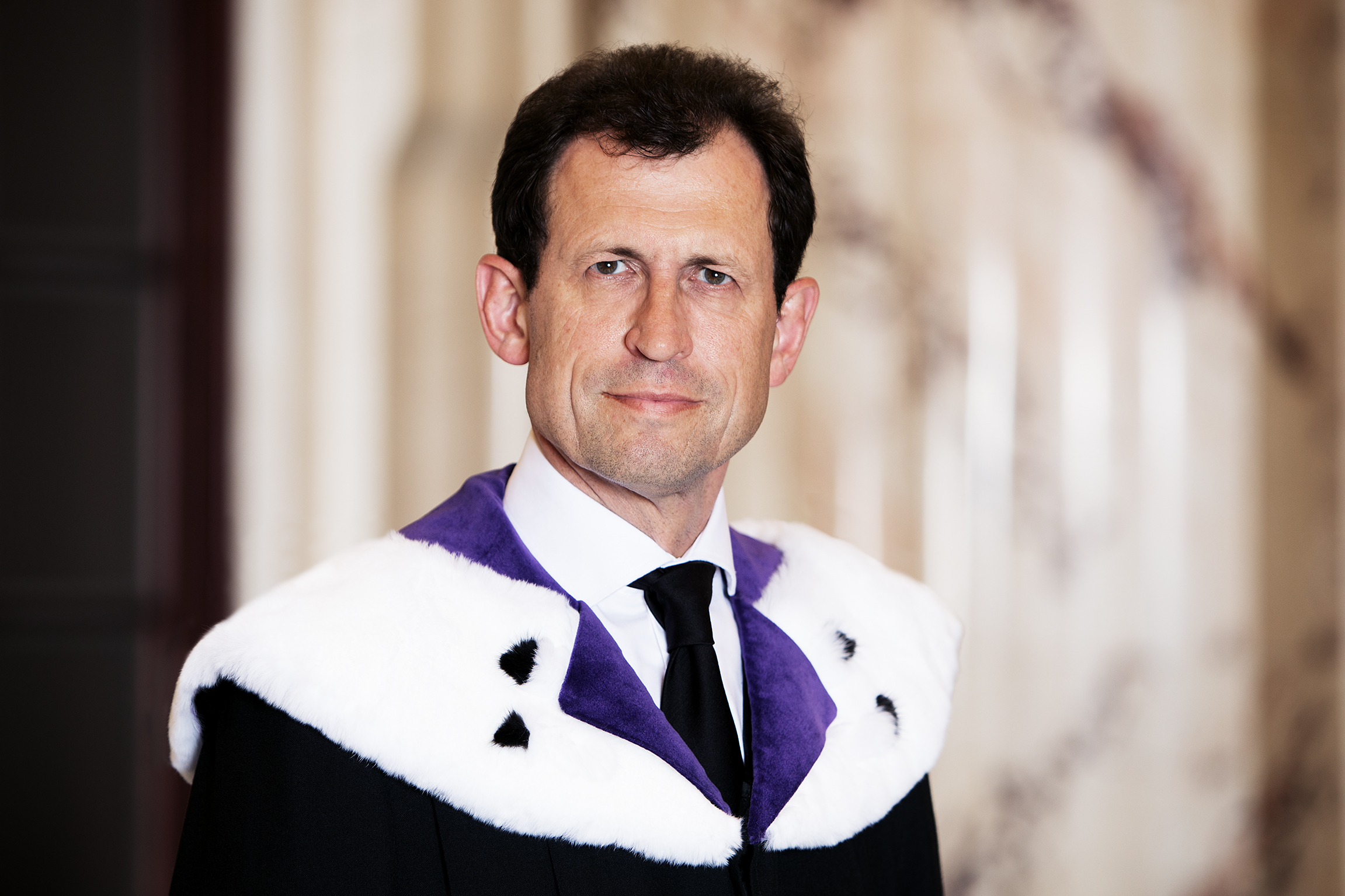

President of the Constitutional Court
- Incumbent
- Assumed office 19 February 2020
- Nominated by: Second Kurz cabinet
- Vice President: Verena Madner
- Preceded by: Brigitte Bierlein

Vice President of the Constitutional Court
- In office 23 February 2018 – 19 February 2020
- Nominated by: First Kurz cabinet
- President: Brigitte Bierlein
- Preceded by: Brigitte Bierlein

Personal details
- Born: 4 August 1966 (age 59) Bruck an der Mur, Austria

Christoph Grabenwarter (born 4 August 1966) is an Austrian legal scholar and professor who since 2020 is President of the country's Constitutional Court.

== Career ==
Born in Bruck an der Mur, Styria, in 1966, Christoph Grabenwarter studied law and business administration at the University of Vienna. He held professorships at several universities, including the University of Vienna, the Johannes Kepler University Linz, the University of Bonn, and the University of Graz. In 1991, Grabenwarter briefly worked for the Secretariat of the European Commission of Human Rights in Straßbourg.

In 2005, he was appointed to the Austrian Constitutional Court as a justice. He was named Vice President of the Court in 2018 and was acting President following the appointment of Brigitte Bierlein as Chancellor in 2019 after the Ibiza affair and the collapse of the first Kurz government. Grabenwarter was officially appointed President of the Court in February 2020.

In January 2022, it emerged that both his appointment as Vice President and his promotion to President were preceded by informal agreements between the ÖVP-FPÖ and ÖVP-Green coalitions, in which his nomination was attributed to the ÖVP. He had already been repeatedly linked to the ÖVP, although he himself rejects label of being “ÖVP-affiliated”.

Grabenwarter is also professor of Public Law, Business Law and International Law at the Vienna University of Economics and Business. Since 2022, he has been an honorary professor at Eötvös Loránd University in Budapest.

== Personal life ==
Grabenwarter is married to notary Alice Grabenwarter and has two daughters.
