= Verena Madner =

Austrian legal scholar, university professor and constitutional judge

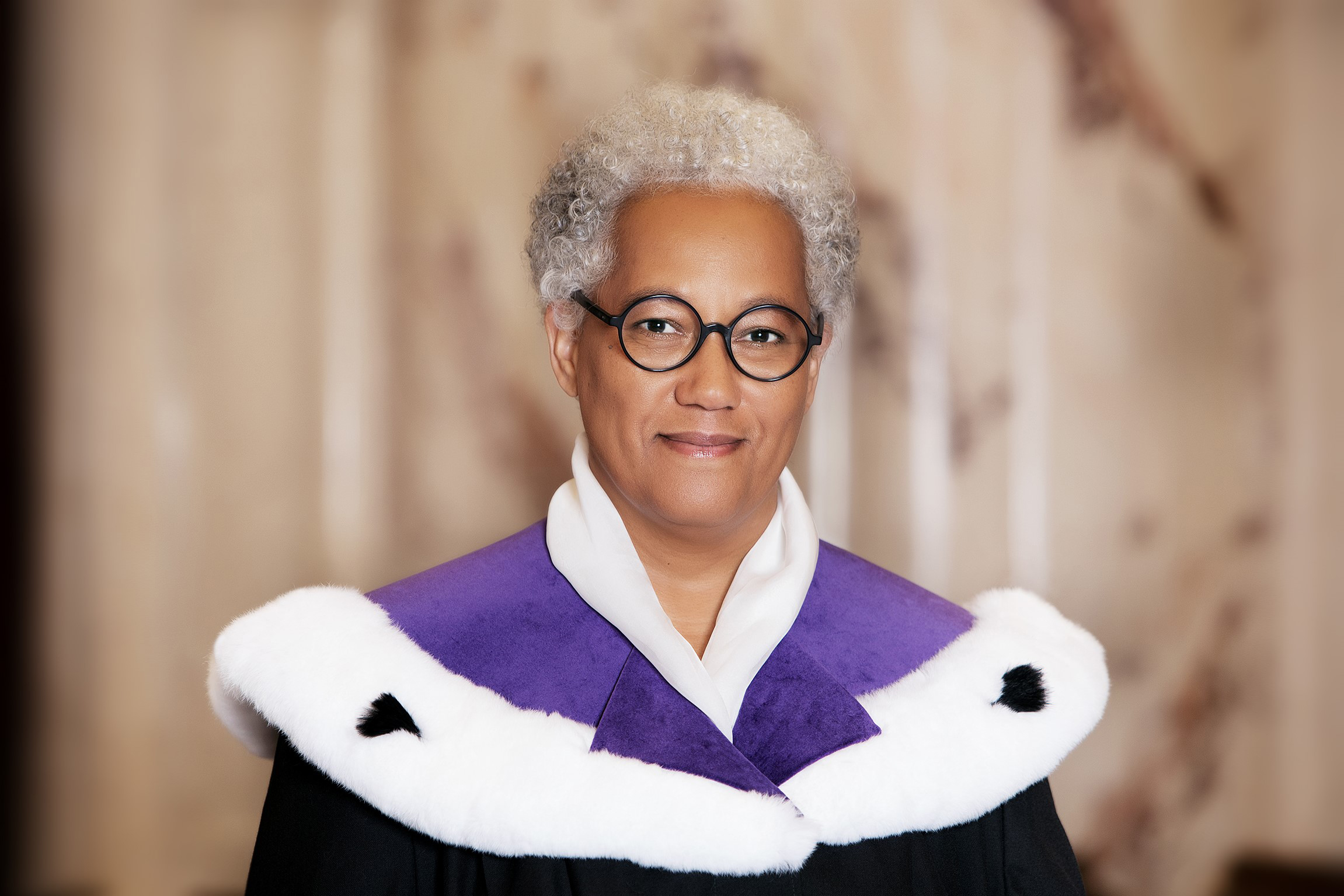

Vice President of the Constitutional Court
- Incumbent
- Assumed office 24 April 2020
- Nominated by: Second Kurz cabinet
- President: Christoph Grabenwarter
- Preceded by: Christoph Grabenwarter

Personal details
- Born: 12 May 1965 (age 61) Linz, Upper Austria, Austria
- Education: University of Vienna (Mag. Iur.)

Verena Madner (born 12 May 1965 in Linz) is an Austrian legal scholar, university professor and constitutional judge. She has been Professor of Public Law at the Department of Socio-Economics at the Vienna University of Economics and Business since 2011. In 2020, she was appointed Vice President of the Austrian Constitutional Court.

== Personal life and education ==
Madner was born in 1965 to a Salzburg teacher and a Beninese judge in the Upper Austrian capital of Linz. She attended the Akademisches Gymnasium Salzburg, where she graduated with honors in 1983. Afterwards she began studying at the Institute for Translation and Interpreting at the University of Vienna in 1983. At the same time, Madner began studying law at the Law Faculty of the University of Vienna in 1984. In November 1989 she was funded there for the Magistra of Law (Mag. Iur.).

After starting her doctorate in law at the University of Vienna in 1989, Madner began her first job as a semi-employed contract assistant at the Institute for Constitutional and Administrative Law at the Vienna University of Economics and Business in October 1990, where she became a university assistant in March 1991. In 1994, Madner completed her doctoral studies with a dissertation on the approval of waste treatment plants.

== Professional background ==
From March 1996 to March 1997, Madner became a legal expert in the Department of European Law in the International Law Office of the Federal Ministry for European and International Affairs while working as a university assistant at the business university. In June 2000, she became a member of the Independent Environmental Senate, a collegial authority with judicial influence, which was responsible for the administrative process in environmental impact assessment procedures for large projects. In August of the same year, she was appointed assistant professor at the Institute for Austrian and European Public Law at the Vienna University of Economics and Business.

In November 2004, Madner was appointed deputy chair of the Independent Environment Senate, and in November 2008 she was finally appointed as its chair. At the University of Economics and Business in February 2011, she was appointed university professor for public law and public management at the Department of Socio-Economics, and at the same time became co-head of the research institute for urban management and governance. In October 2015, Madner was appointed full university professor for public law, environmental law and public and urban governance at the Department of Socio-Economics at WU. In 2018 she took over the management of the Institute for Law and Governance at the Vienna University of Economics and Business.

In 2019, Mayor Michael Ludwig appointed Madner to the newly founded City of Vienna's Climate Council.

In 2020, Madner was nominated by the Federal Government Kurz II as Vice President of the Austrian Constitutional Court. With the appointment by Federal President Alexander Van der Bellen on 24 April 2020, she became the second woman to be appointed to this highest judicial office.
