= Gerhart Holzinger =

Austrian jurist, educator and civil servant (born 1947)

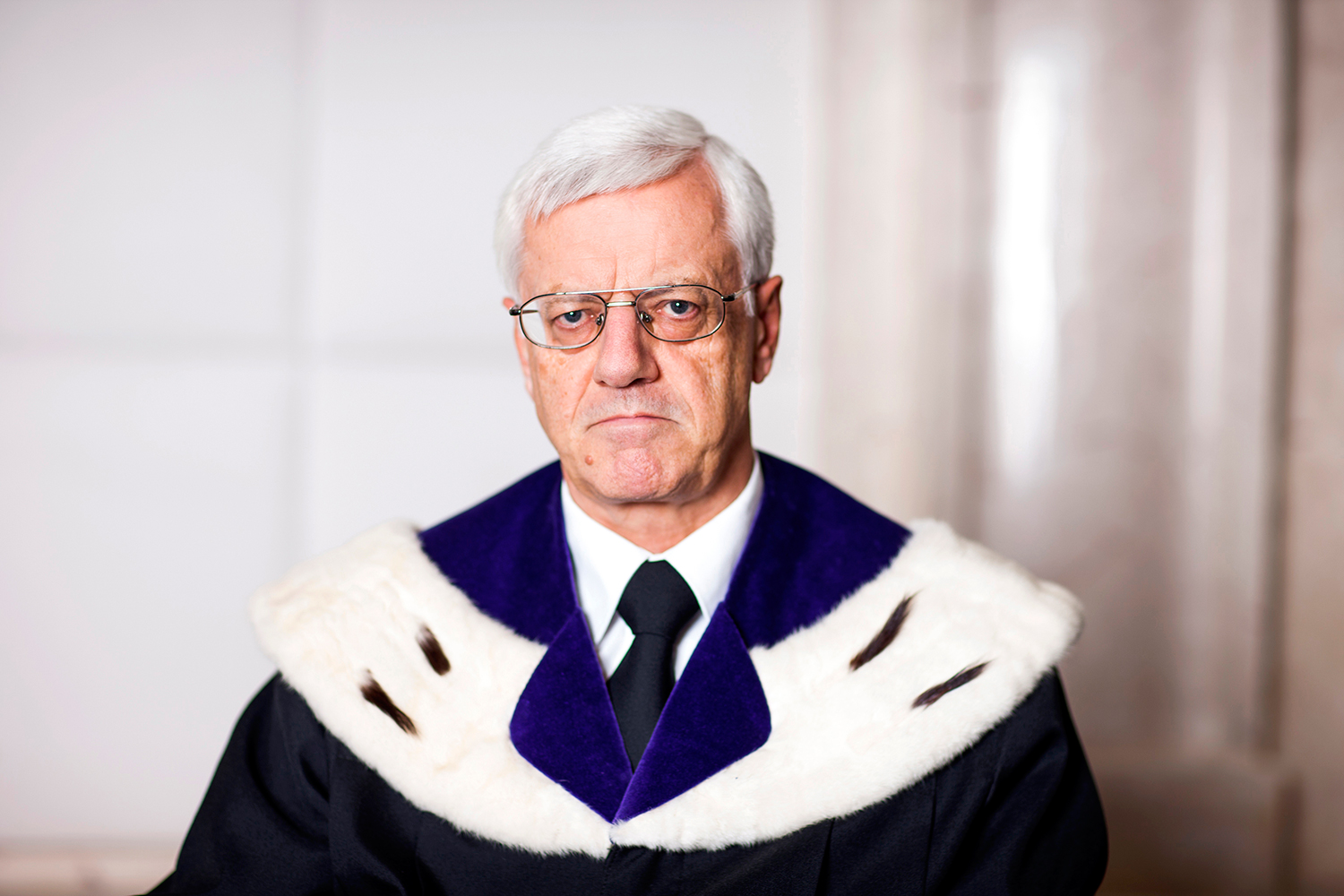

President of the Constitutional Court
- In office 1 May 2008 – 31 December 2017
- Vice President: Brigitte Bierlein
- Preceded by: Karl Korinek
- Succeeded by: Brigitte Bierlein

Personal details
- Born: 12 June 1947 (age 79) Gmunden, Upper Austria, Austria
- Spouse: Karin Holzinger
- Children: 2 daughters
- Education: University of Salzburg

Gerhart Holzinger (born 12 June 1947 in Gmunden, Upper Austria) is an Austrian jurist, educator, and career civil servant. He was appointed to the Austrian Constitutional Court in 1995, serving as its president from 2008 until his retirement in 2017.

== Early life ==
Gerhart Holzinger was born on 12 June 1947 in Gmunden.

Holzinger comes from a working-class family and grew up in modest circumstances. His father worked for a local utility company; his mother was a homemaker. Young Holzinger was originally not expected to obtain higher education. He dreamt of becoming a forester. After completing elementary school, he was enrolled in the local hauptschule, the type of middle school attended by children destined not for high school but for trade school or manual labor. It came as a surprise to the family when Holzinger's mathematics teacher suggested that the boy be sent to gymnasium to receive a more extensive secondary education. Holzinger graduated from gymnasium in 1966, the first person in his wider family to obtain matura and thus to earn the right to attend university.

Volunteering to do twelve instead of the mandatory eight months, Holzinger then left for his stint in the army.

== Career ==
After his year of national service, Holzinger enrolled in the University of Salzburg, originally reading German studies. He had fallen in love with literature and language as an adolescent, spending long hours reading the classics and memorizing Goethe's Faust, but was made to question his choice of career by endless and exhausting lectures on the analysis of Biedermeier poetry. At the same time, he found himself impressed by René Marcic, a legal philosopher lecturing on the importance of law for society.

Holzinger abandoned German studies, switched to jurisprudence, and received a doctorate of law in 1972.

Having graduated, he spent three years as an assistant professor at the University of Salzburg's Department of Constitutional and Administrative Law. His supervisor was Kurt Ringhofer, an eminent scholar and justice on the Constitutional Court.

In 1975, Holzinger left Salzburg for Vienna, joining the Constitutional Service in the Chancellery, an office that assists ministries in drafting legislation and in evaluating the constitutionality of draft statutes drafted elsewhere. By 1984, he had risen to head of the Service. In 1992, he was granted the title of Head of Section (German: Sektionschef), the highest rank an Austrian civil servant can hold. Holzinger credits his success to the mentorship he received from Ludwig Adamovich as well as to the support of Bruno Kreisky, Fred Sinowatz, Franz Vranitzky, Karl Lausecker, and Franz Löschnak.

In 1995, Constitutional Court justice Peter Jann accepted an appointment to the European Court of Justice, resigning from his position in Austria. The Vranitzky government recommended Holzinger as his replacement. Assenting to the recommendation, President Thomas Klestil had Holzinger take the bench on 31 May 1995.

Throughout his career in government service, Holzinger held numerous extramural engagements and offices. He served on the executive committee of the International Institute of Administrative Sciences in Brussels from 1989 to 1998 and as the president of the Austrian Society of Administrative Sciences (Österreichische verwaltungswissenschaftliche Gesellschaft) from 1997 to 2009.

Holzinger chaired the Ministry of the Interior Human Rights Council (Menschenrechtsbeirat) from 1999 to 2003.

He was a member of the Austrian section of the International Commission of Jurists, becoming its secretary general in 1995 and serving as its president from 2000 to 2008.

He was active in the Austrian Convention on Constitutional Reform (Österreichkonvent), a reform initiative launched by the second Schüssel government that aimed at decluttering Austria's famously extensive and convoluted body of constitutional law.

He has been president of the Vienna Law Society (Wiener juristische Gesellschaft) since 2013.

Most notably, Holzinger kept pursuing an academic career on the side. In 1998, he submitted his habilitation thesis to thee University of Graz and became an associate professor (Dozent) of Austrian constitutional and administrative law. He was made an honorary full professor in 2002.

Holzinger was also made a member of the Board of Governors (Universitätsrat) of the University of Graz in 2013.

When Karl Korinek resigned the presidency of the Constitutional Court for health reasons in 2008, the Gusenbauer government nominated Holzinger as Korinek's successor. President Heinz Fischer affirmed the appointment without hesitation, effective from 1 May. Holzinger's appointment was uncontroversial.

Having reached the mandatory retirement age of 70, Holzinger left the court on 31 December 2017.

== Politics ==
Holzinger is considered conservative. He has never joined any political party but has been a member of the Cartellverband since his student days.

Holzinger has consistently maintained an amiable working relationship with both sides of the political spectrum.

In 1990, Josef Riegler of the Austrian People's Party considered Holzinger as a potential successor for Egmont Foregger, the outgoing minister of justice at the time.

In 1992, on the other hand, the Social Democrats considered Holzinger as a possible president of the Court of Auditors (Rechnungshof). His 1999 appointment to the Human Rights Council was due to Karl Schlögl, minister of the interior for the Social Democrats, but was confirmed for a second term in 2002 by Ernst Strasser, minister of the interior for the People's Party.

His nomination to the Constitutional Court was referred to as "obvious" and "a clear decision" by Social Democrats and the People's Party alike and also enjoyed the support of two out of the three oppositional parties at the time.

Both Social Democrats and People Party have, in fact, tried to claim Holzinger as one of their own.

An expert on fundamental rights questions, Holzinger has tended to support expansive interpretations of constitutional civil liberties and due process guarantees. In human rights matters, commentators have noted, he regularly found himself more aligned with Social Democrats and Greens than with his fellow conservatives.

== Personal life ==
Holzinger is married. His wife, Karin Holzinger, is a bank clerk.

He has two daughters, born in 1982 and 1983, respectively.

Holzinger enjoys mountain climbing, cycling, and running marathons. He has finished an Ironman Triathlon in 2006, at the age of nearly sixty, and other triathlons besides. He still feels close to his native Gmunden and its environs, especially to the Traunstein.

He also still loves theater, including contemporary theater, and attends regularly.

== Awards and honours ==
- 1995: Grand Decoration of Honour in Gold for Services to the Republic of Austria
- 1995: Alexis de Tocqueville Award of the European Institute of Public Administration
- 2012: Grand Decoration of Honour in Gold with Sash for Services to the Republic of Austria
- 2017: Grand Order of Merit with Star and Sash of the Federal Republic of Germany
- 2017: Grand Cross of the Order of Merit of the Republic of Hungary
- 2017: Decoration of Merit of the Province of Salzburg
- 2018: Golden Pin of Honour of the Austrian Federal Economic Chamber

== Selected publications ==
- Holzinger, Gerhart (1975). Der Begriff der Schutzwürdigkeit. Systematische Darstellung von Rechtsvorschriften zum Schutz von Objekten, Flächen und Gebieten im Lande Salzburg (= Schriftenreihe des Salzburger Institutes für Raumforschung. Nr. 4). Salzburg.
- — (1988). Die Notstandskompetenz des Landeshauptmannes im Sinne der B-VG-Novelle 1984 (= Schriftenreihe der Österreichischen Gesellschaft zur Förderung der Landesverteidigung). Vienna.
- — (1989). Der Verfassungsdienst der Republik Österreich (= Vorträge, Reden und Berichte aus dem Europa-Institut der Universität des Saarlandes in Saarbrücken. Nr. 180). Saarbrücken.
- With Neisser, Heinrich; Wimmer, Norbert, eds. (1990). Funktion der Verfassung. Referate und Thesen der verfassungsrechtlichen Arbeitsgemeinschaft beim Europäischen Forum Alpbach 1989 zu Fragen der Funktion der Verfassung in der modernen Gesellschaft (= Juristische Schriftenreihe. Nr. 27). Vienna: Verlag Österreich. ISBN 978-3-7046-0197-1.
- — (1998). Die bevorstehende Öffnung Österreichs in den Europäischen Wirtschaftsraum und die Europäischen Gemeinschaften (= Verhandlungen des Zwölften Österreichischen Juristentages I/1: Gutachten). Vienna: Manz’sche Verlags- und Universitätsbuchhandlung. ISBN 978-3-214-06467-9.
- With Köhler, Martin, eds. (2001). Verwaltungsverfahrensrecht (2nd ed.). Vienna: Verlag Österreich. ISBN 978-3-7046-0254-1.
- With Funk, Bernd-Christian; Klecatsky, Hans; Korinek, Karl; Mantl, Wolfgang; Pernthaler, Peter, eds. (2002). Der Rechtsstaat vor neuen Herausforderungen. Festschrift für Ludwig Adamovich zum 70. Geburtstag. Vienna. ISBN 978-3-7046-3861-8.
- With Bammer, Armin; Vogl, Mathias; Wenda, Gregor, eds. (200). Rechtsschutz gestern – heute – morgen. Festgabe zum 80. Geburtstag von Rudolf Machacek und Franz Matscher. Vienna: Neuer Wissenschaftlicher Verlag. ISBN 978-3-7083-0500-4.
- With (2013). Verfassung kompakt. Meine Grundrechte und mein Rechtsschutz. Wegweiser durch die österreichische Verfassung (2nd ed.). Vienna: Linde Verlag. ISBN 978-3-7093-0530-0.
- With Oberndorfer, Peter; Raschauer, Bernhard, eds. (2013). Österreichische Verwaltungslehre (3rd ed.). Vienna: Verlag Österreich. ISBN 978-3-7046-6457-0.
- With Adamovich, Ludwig; Funk, Bernd-Christian (2014). Österreichisches Staatsrecht (3rd ed.). Vienna: Verlag Österreich.
- With Hiesel, Martin, eds. (2015). Verfahren vor den Gerichtshöfen des öffentlichen Rechts (= Manzsche Große Gesetzesausgaben. Band I: Verfassungsgerichtsbarkeit) (4th ed.). Vienna: Manz’sche Verlags- und Universitätsbuchhandlung.
