= Europa-Forum Wachau =

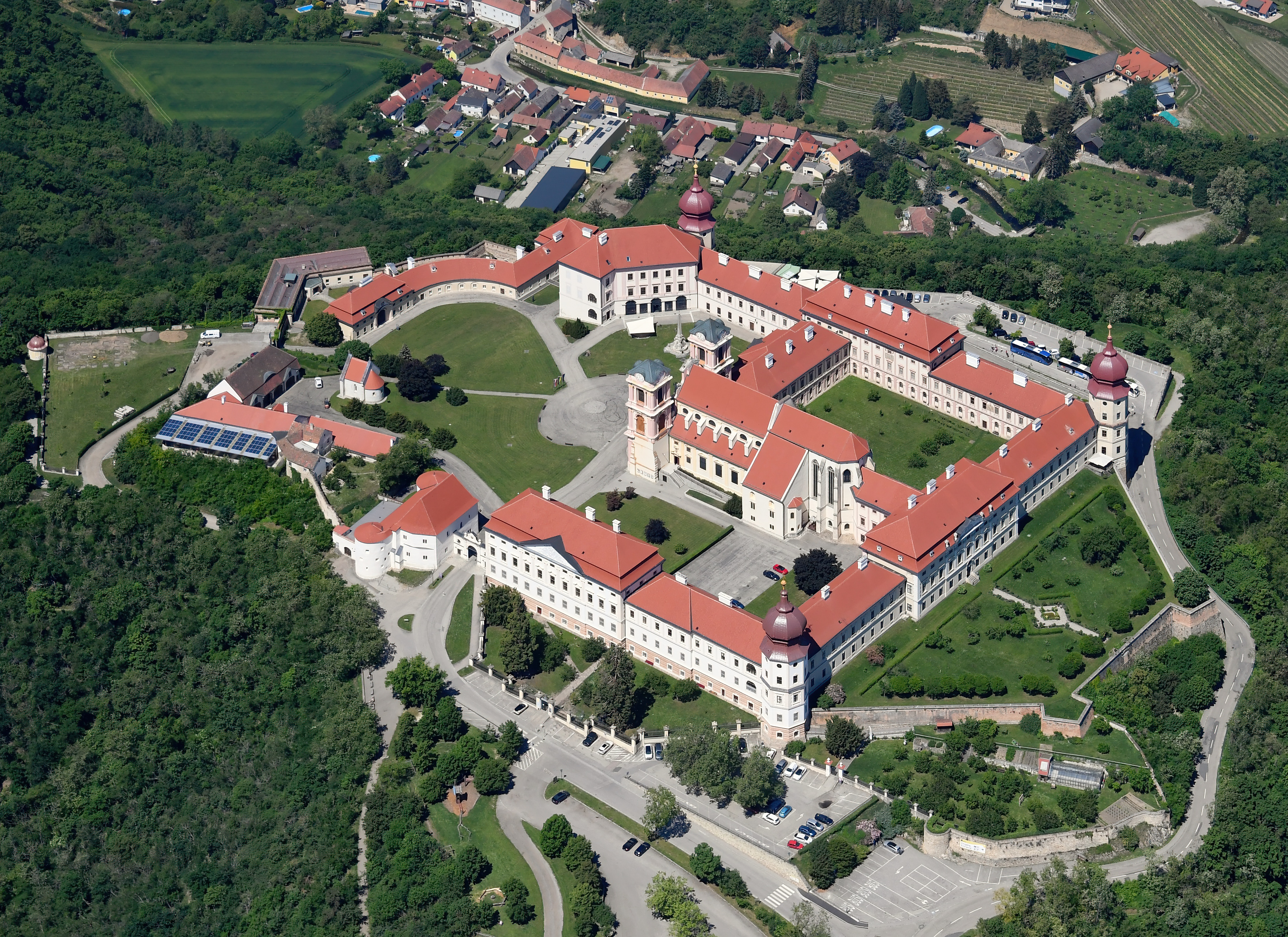
The main location of the "Europa-Forum Wachau"

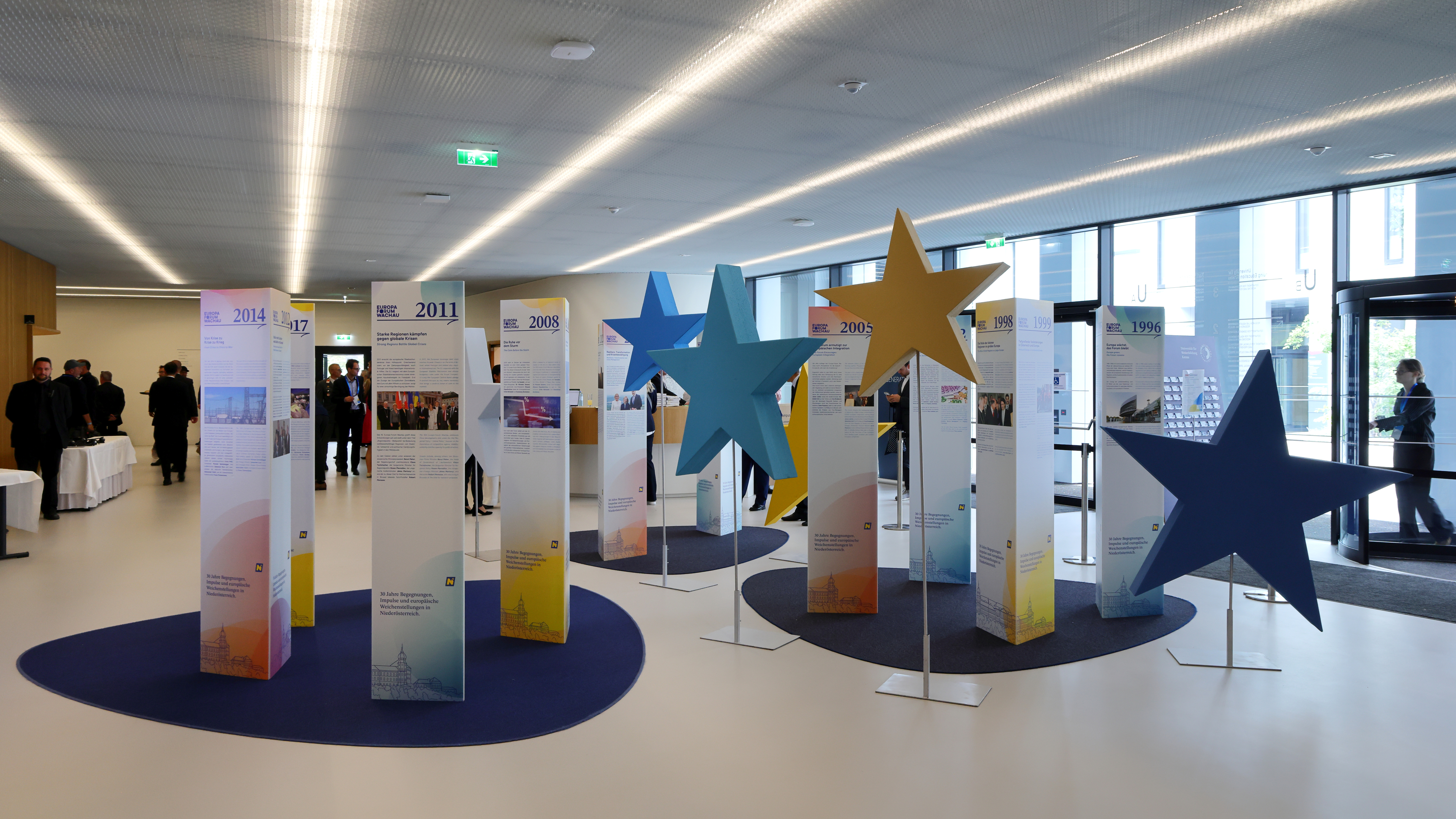
The reception hall on the Krems campus, adapted for the “Europa-Forum Wachau 2026”

The Europa-Forum Wachau is a discussion meeting that was first held in 1995 in Göttweig Abbey in Lower Austria. Since 1995, the meeting has been held annually with the exception of 2006. The event is mostly held in June but has been moved to May and July in previous years because of special circumstances.

The inaugural Europa-Forum Wachau took place in 1995, the same year that Austria entered the European Union, with the purpose to strengthen closeness to citizens and to serve as an impulse and discussion platform for political decisions concerning Europe. The discussion meeting is held by the club "Europa-Forum Wachau" in partnership with the "Federal Ministry for european and international matters" and the land government of Lower Austria. The event focuses on political developments of the danube region. Special attention goes to security related, regional, economical and cultural topics. The Austrian publicist and host Paul Lendvai has been hosting the discussion event since its inauguration in 1995.

Over the years many famous European politicians attended the Europa-Forum.

== Founding and organisation ==
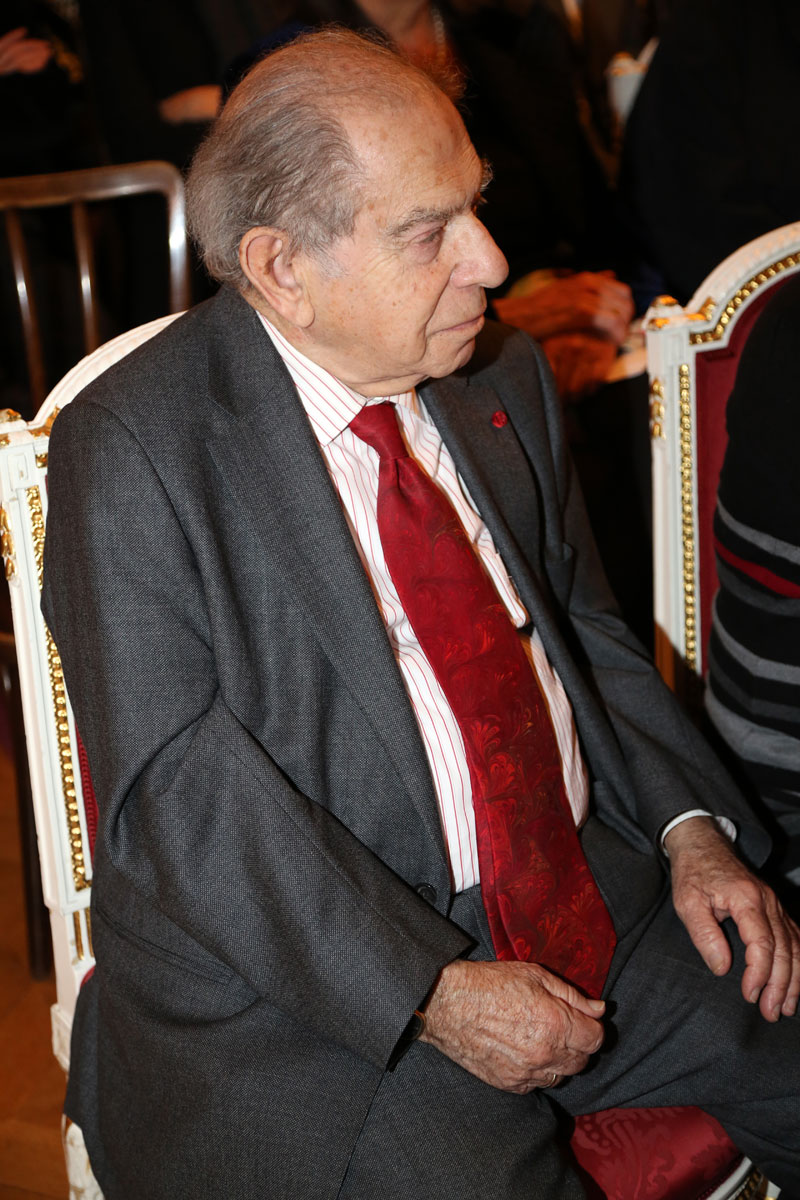
host Paul Lendvai

The annually held Europa-Forum was founded with the goal to intensify the European thought. A big reason for this was the 1994 Austrian European Union membership referendum on 12 June 1994. The location, Göttweig Abbey in Wachau was chosen specifically to demonstrate the importance of Christianity in Europe politics and the closeness to citizens.

The yearly discussion meeting is organized by the land government of Lower Austria. Additionally, the Verein works closely with the Austria Institut for Europe and Security Policy. and several educational institutions. The Europa-Forum is being sponsored by Raiffeisen Bankengruppe and the Austrian Federal Economic Chamber amongst others.

== The first ten years 1995 - 2004 ==
Six years after the Iron Curtain fell and Europe was reunited, the first Europa-Forum Wachau took place in 1995 in Göttweig Abbey. Always attending in the first ten years were then governor of Lower Austria Erwin Pröll and then federal chancellor Wolfgang Schüssel. One of the many goals is to make a contribution to the European mutual consent.

After the extension of the EU by ten more member states, Lower Austria was shifted into the center of the European Union, both politically and geographically. Step by step, borders to neighbouring countries like Czech Republic and Slovakia were made possible. Because of this, Lower Austria held a Three-Countries-Day with its neighbours. The new European Union of 25 was the main focus of the 10th annual "Europa-Forum Wachau".

== Europa-Forum Wachau in 2013 und 2014 - Crisis and Democracy ==
=== 2013 ===
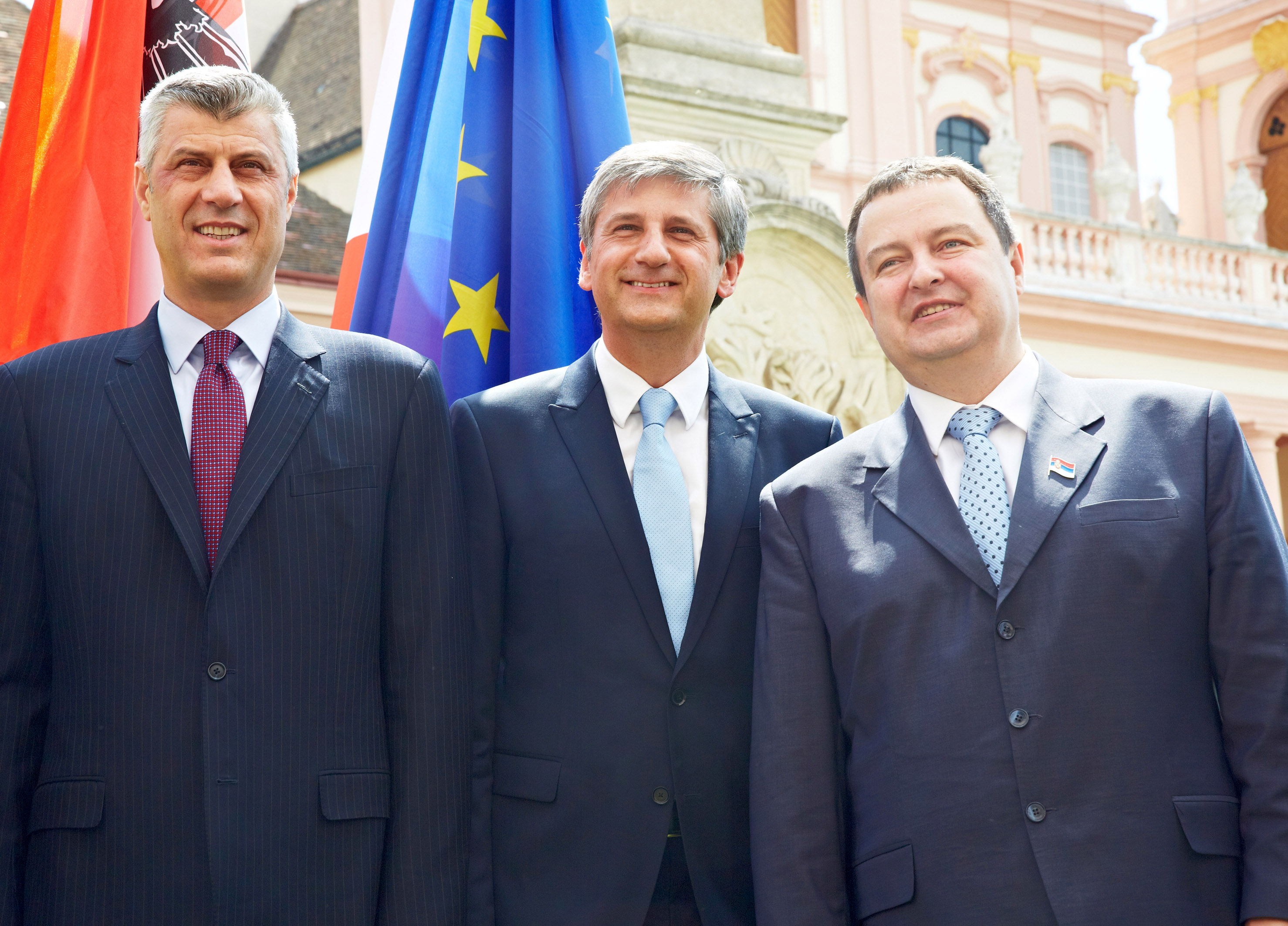
foreign minister Michael Spindelegger (Mitte) with the Serbian prime minister Ivica Dacic on the left and the Kosovian prime minister Hashim Thaci on the right.

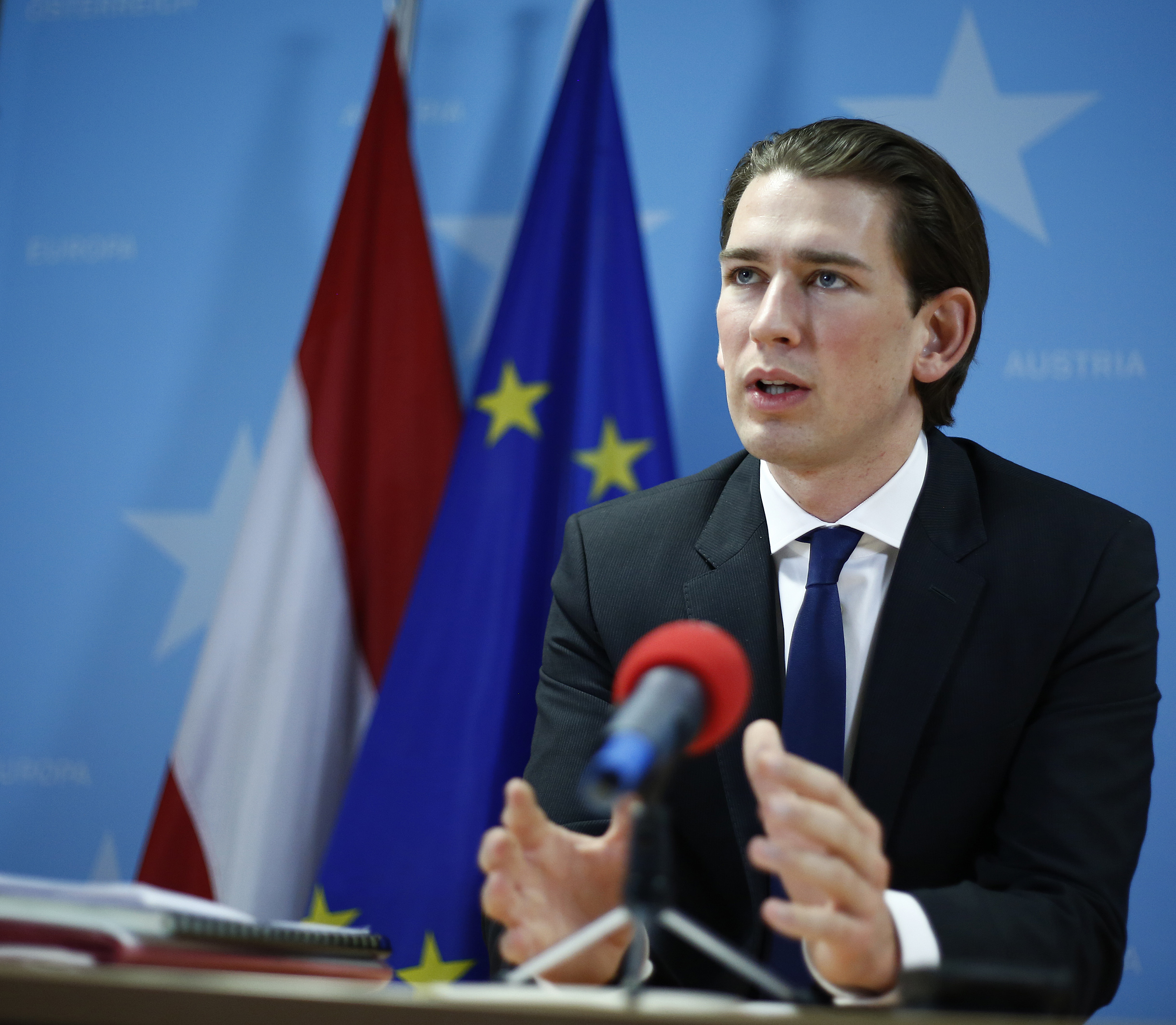
foreign minister Sebastian Kurz

The discussion meeting was held on 15 and 16 June 2013 and specifically focused on the crisis that some EU-states were in. "Beyond the crisis - Outlines of a new Europe" was a special motto of discussions between politicians of Austria, the EU and Balkan states. The meeting between Serbia's and Kosovo's head of government was of great importance. Then Austrian outside chancellor Michael Spindelegger was responsible for the meeting of Ivica Dačić and Hashim Thaçi, together they took a big step towards the European Union.

In addition to that, famous Austrian author Miguel-Herz Kestranek, Erwin Pröll, European commissioner Johannes Hahn and Latvian politician Valdis Dombrovskis were attending as special guests and held speeches.

=== 2014 ===
On the 17th and 18 May 2014 the Europa-Forum Wachau took place under the motto "Democracy in Europe - We have the Choice". The conflict between Ukraine and Russia was a central topic, European security politics were also in the spotlight.

Yet again high-level guests, such as Erwin Pröll, former federal chancellor of Austria Alfred Gusenbauer, former minister of defense of Austria Sebastian Kurz, Johannes Hahn and Michael Spindelegger attended the discussion event. The Serbian prime minister Aleksandar Vučić had to cancel his visit to the Europa-Forum because of a flood in Serbia. He was represented by the Serbian ambassador Pero Jankovic.

== Europa-Forum Wachau 2015 ==
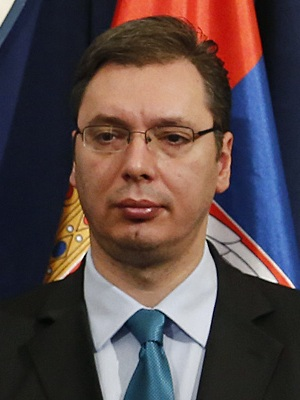
Aleksandar Vučić

The theme of the 20th Europa-Forum was "Is Europa facing borders? Europe's role in the world". The most important speakers were the Georgian defense minister Tina Khidasheli, Johannes Hahn, Aleksandar Vucic and former vice chancellor of Austria Reinhold Mitterlehner.

At the end of the event, Erwin Pröll awarded Paul Lendvai with the honor statuette of Leopold III, Margrave of Austria, the patron saint of Lower Austria, to thank him for his role as host that he has been fulfilling since the 1st Europa-Forum. 2015 was also the first time that the "Europa-Staatspreis" was awarded during this celebration.

== Europa-Forum Wachau 2016 ==
The Europa-Forum 2016 took place on the 11th and 12 June. The theme was "Europe - united in wealth, split in crisis", the forum was moderated by Paul Lendvai. Discussions were held about the refugee crisis, the dangers of nationalism and populism and Europe's position in the economy. Personalities with political, economical and cultural positions were invited, such Sebastian Kurz, Erwin Pröll and Bulgarian outside chancellor Daniel Mitow.

== Outlook for 2017 ==
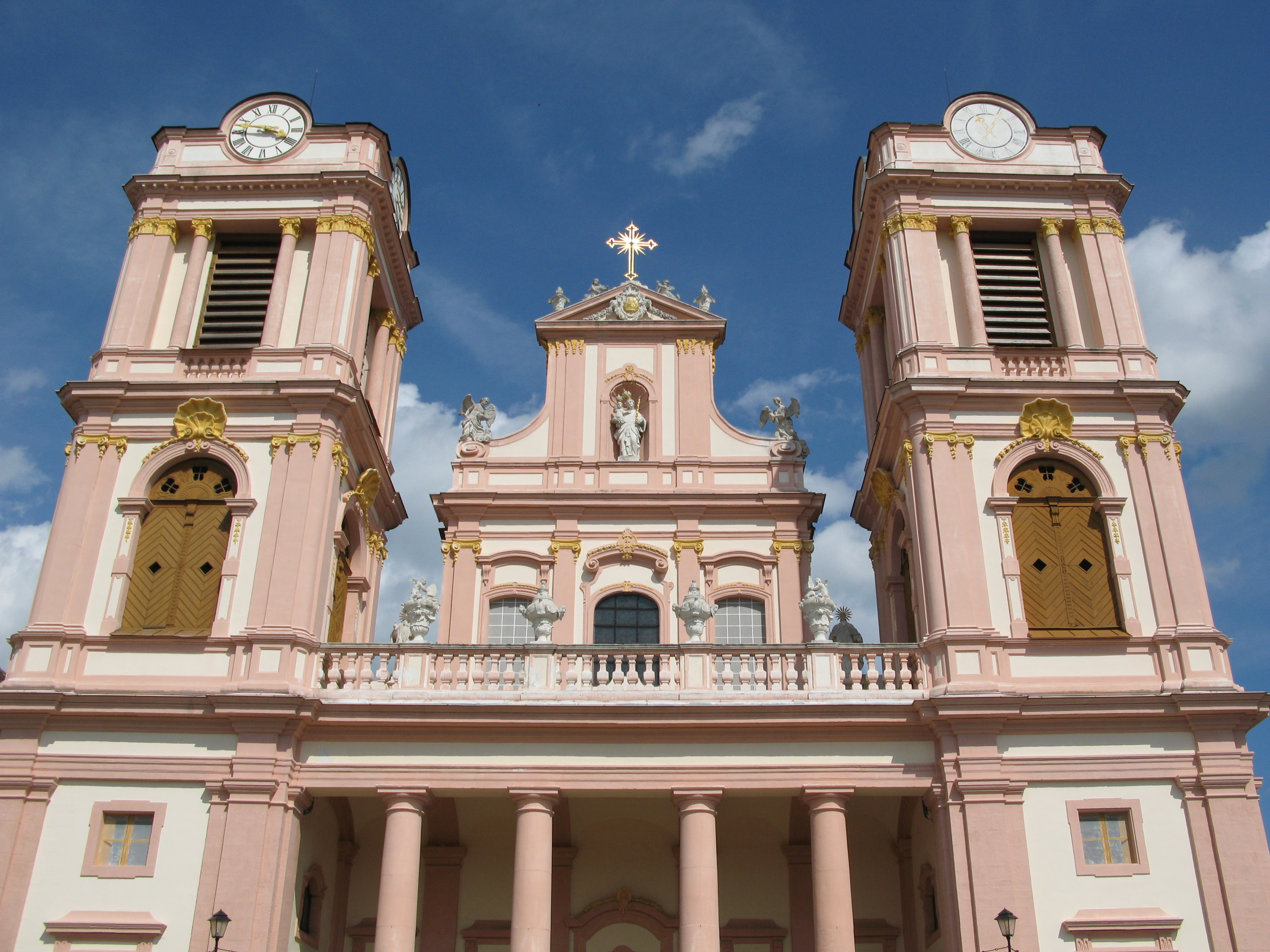
Göttweig Abbey

The Europa-Forum 2017 is going to be held on the 10th and 11 June in Göttweig Abbey in Lower Austria.

The event is under the motto "Closeness to citizens in Europe". The program follows the usual structure and is being split into four main topics which are:

- security: "The EU global strategy: How can it help the EU to accomplish more security?"
- regional: "Diversity and subsidiarity of Europe: Making decisions efficient and close to citizens."
- economical: "Between Asia and USA: How can Europa stay competitive?"
- cultural: "Tension between Migration, democracy and constitutionality"

The contents of "Europa-Forum Wachau" 2017 are topics of discussion in a class of University Vienna in cooperation with Wikimedia Austria. The discussed topics are going to be summarized in encyclopedical form as well as translated into other languages which will broaden the informational aspect of the event.

== Youth in the "Europa-Forum" ==
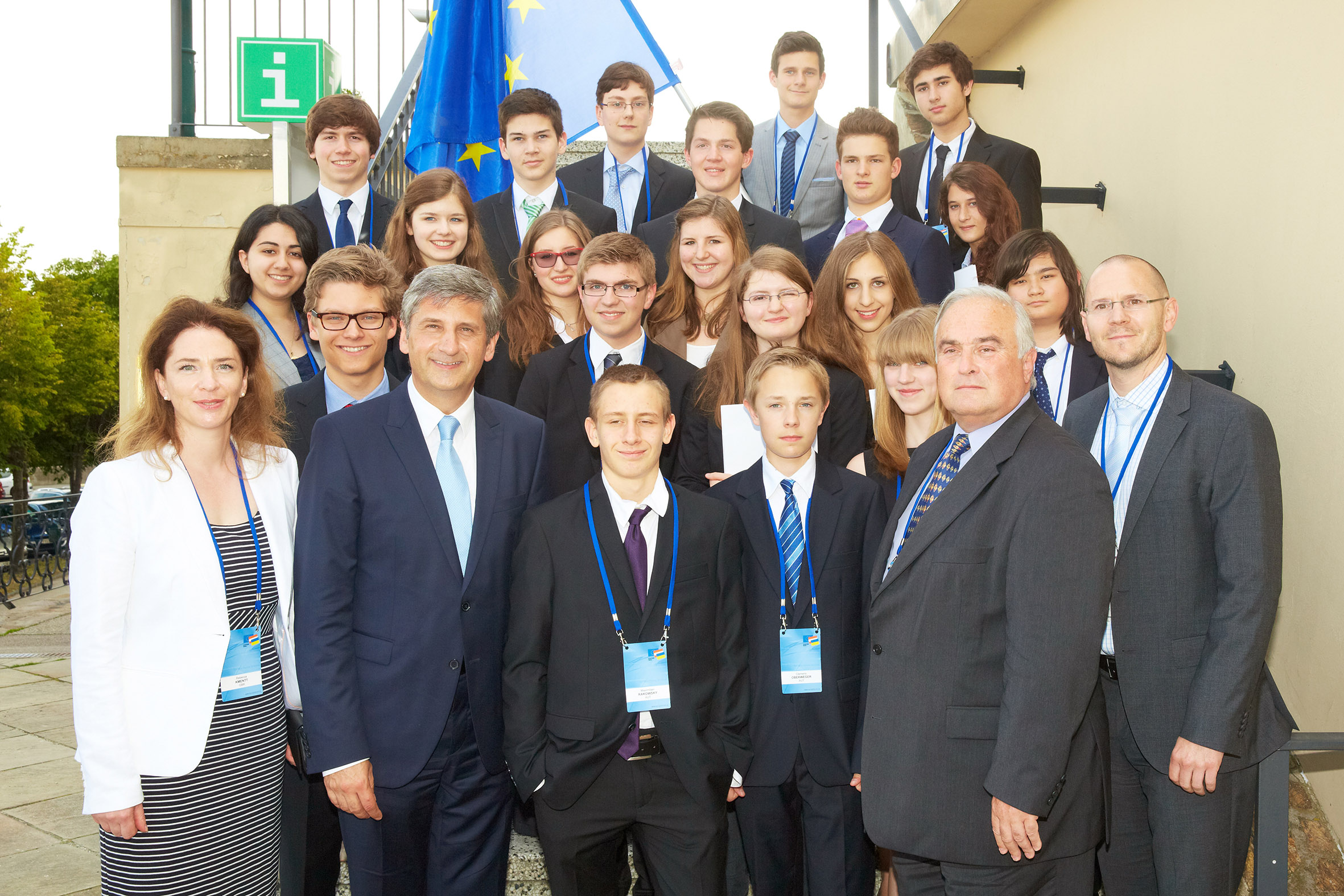
foreign minister Spindelegger (second to left) in 2013 with a school closs

Johanna Mikl-Leitner, then elect governor for social matters, work and family in Lower Austria organized a youth plenum on the occasion of the Forum's 10th anniversary. Young people between 18 and 25 from all 25 member states of the EU were invited to the youth plenum 2004. The goal was to strengthen the participation of young people for European topics, as well as to intensify the personal contact to young people.

Alone we are words, together we are a poem. Europa mustn't stay a word, Europe has to become a poem.

— Erwin Pröll, Commemorative publication to celebrate the 15th Europa-Forum Wachau.

In 2016, students of St. Pölten University of Applied Sciences created four different PR concepts for the Europa-Forum Wachau, which focused on social media and press activities before, during and after the event. The goal was to communicate the message of Europa-Forum more broadly through technical means. A few measures of these concepts were implemented.

== Literature ==
- Europa-Forum Wachau (ed.): 5 Jahre Europa-Forum Wachau. 1995 bis 1999. Redaktion: Mag. Brigitte Karner, 1999
- Europa-Forum Wachau (ed.): Jubiläumsfestschrift Europa-Forum Wachau. 10. Europa-Forum Wachau. Schwerpunkte, Diskussionsbeiträge und Zitate aus den Jahren 1999 bis 2003. Redaktion: Mag. Brigitte Karner, 2004
- Europa-Forum Wachau (ed.): Jubiläumsfestschrift 15. Europa-Forum Wachau. Schwerpunkte, Diskussionsbeiträge und Bilddokumente aus den Jahren 2004 bis 2009. Wissenschaftliche Beratung und Erstellung des Festschrift-Textes: AIES - Austria Institut für Europa- und Sicherheitspolitik, Maria Enzersdorf 2010
