= Constitutional Court (Austria) =

Constitutional court of Austria

- Verfassungsgerichtshof
- Established: 1920
- Location: Innere Stadt, Vienna, Austria
- Composition method: Justices are sworn in by the President on nomination of either the Government, the National Council, or the Federal Council
- Authorised by: Federal Constitutional Law
- Judge term length: Mandatory retirement at 70 years of age
- Number of positions: 14 members (including the President and the Vice President); 6 substitute members
- Website: www.vfgh.gv.at

President
- Currently: Christoph Grabenwarter
- Since: 19 February 2020

Vice President
- Currently: Verena Madner
- Since: 24 April 2020

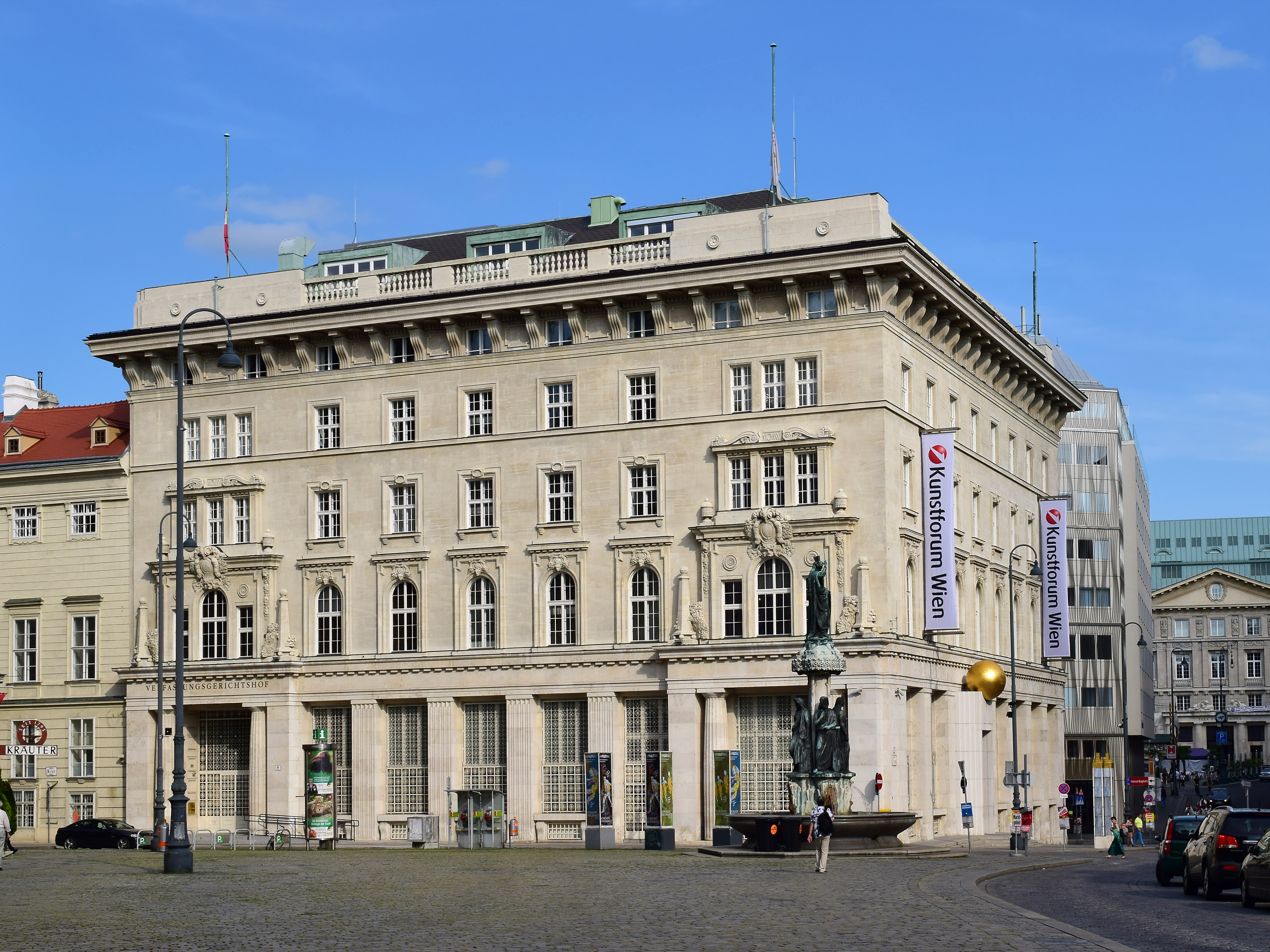
Seat of the Court in Vienna.

The Constitutional Court (German: Verfassungsgerichtshof [fɛɐˈfasʊŋsɡəˌʁɪçtshoːf] or VfGH [faʊʔɛfɡeːˈhaː]) in Austria is the tribunal responsible for judicial review.

It verifies the constitutionality of statutes, the legality of ordinances and other secondary legislation, and the constitutionality of decisions of certain other courts. The Court also decides over demarcation conflicts between courts, between courts and the public administration, and between federal and state bodies. It hears election complaints, holds elected officials and political appointees accountable for their conduct in office, and adjudicates on liability claims against Austria and its bureaucracy.

The Court consists of fourteen members and six substitute members, appointed by the president on nomination of the Cabinet, the National Council, and the Federal Council. Although theoretically supposed to, the Court rarely meets in plenum and rarely hears oral arguments; most cases today are decided behind closed doors by panels of either nine or five members. Opinions tend to be concise and academic.

The Constitutional Court is very powerful but has historically exhibited considerable judicial restraint.

Christoph Grabenwarter is currently serving as the court's president.

== Powers and responsibilities ==
=== Liability claims ===
The Constitutional Court adjudicates on liability claims against the Republic, its provinces, and its municipalities.

=== Demarcation conflicts ===
The Constitutional Court adjudicates on competing claims of authority:

- between courts and the bureaucracy;
- between general courts and administrative courts;
- between other courts and the Constitutional Court itself;
- between provincial governments;
- between one of the provincial governments and the national government.

The complaint does not have to come from one of the competing entities directly. Persons, natural or other, who believe they are being violated in their rights by an authority improperly assuming jurisdiction have a subsidiary right to complain; they can file suit on behalf of the authority they believe is being stepped over. Persons also have a subsidiary right to demand that the Constitutional Court deal with negative demarcation conflicts. If a person applies for a permit or for some other administrative act and gets turned away by two different authorities, each claiming that the matter falls within the purview of the respectively other, the applicant can ask the Constitutional Court to order one of the authorities to assume responsibility and take action.

The national government and the provincial governments can ask the Constitutional Court to decide a possible demarcation conflict before it becomes an actual controversy. If the national legislature is considering an act that the national cabinet thinks would infringe the area of competence reserved to the provinces, the national cabinet can send the draft act to the Constitutional Court for review. The national cabinet can also ask for a review of secondary legislation it is considering. Provincial cabinets, likewise, can ask the Court to review draft provincial legislation, primary or secondary. The legislation has to be draft; it cannot have been resolved upon yet. The Court's verdict becomes constitutional law and is published as such in the statutory gazette. The verdict thus binds even the Constitutional Court itself, preventing it from overruling itself on the matter; only an amendment to the constitution can supersede the decision.

=== Judicial review ===
The Constitutional Court ensures that all Austrian legislation, primary or secondary, conforms to any Austrian legislation outranking it. Statutes and international treaties that have been elevated to statute rank by the legislature have to conform to the constitution. Executive ordinances and ordinary treaties also have to conform to ordinary law. Supplementary ordinances additionally have to conform to the original ordinances they derive from. A road sign, for instance, needs to be legal under the Road Traffic Act but also in compliance with the Ministry of Commerce Regulation on Road Signs. Since the Austrian constitution defines Austria to be a federation, the provinces are federated states on paper and have token constitutions of their own; provincial law has to conform with these as well as with the national constitution.

The Court does not check legislation for compliance with European Union law.

Unconstitutional laws and ordinances are not void ex tunc. The Court's decision rescinds them just like abrogation by the legislature or the administration would have done; decisions based on them that have been made in the past remain standing. The Court has some latitude with respect to the date its decision becomes effective. Usually, laws and ordinances found to be unconstitutional go out of force the day after the publication of the verdict. To prevent disruption, however, the Court can set a grace period during which a piece of unconstitutional legislation still remains on the rolls and may still be applied. The grace period may last up to six months for ordinances and up to eighteen months for laws. The Court may allow eighteen months for ordinances that are de facto statutes because their disappearance will require a new statute to deal with. On the other hand, the Court can also make its decision retroactive. The Court's broad discretion forces the Court to "legislate from the bench" whether it wants to or not: the Court does not simply announce a finding it notionally cannot avoid; it is officially choosing policy.

The Court cannot void treaties because Austria cannot unilaterally rescind an agreement it has entered into under international law. The Court can, however, order Austrian officials to stop applying the treaty. If this puts Austria in breach of treaty obligations, it is up to the administration to negotiate an amendment to the treaty or a withdrawal from it. As with statutes and ordinances it strikes, the Court can grant a grace period during which the provisions of the treaty can still be applied. The grace period may last up to two years for treaties that alter the constitution of the European Union and up to one year for most other treaties.

Legislation can be challenged before the Constitutional Court by any private person, natural or other. The complaint has to argue that the complainant is being violated in their rights by the piece of legislation at issue, actually and not just potentially. The complaint also has to argue that there is no plausible way for the complainant to get the problem resolved through any other procedure. Depending on the type of the statute, ordinance, or treaty, the Court can often also be called upon by the national government, by regional governments, or by groups of national or regional legislators.

Legislation can also be challenged by courts that are trying cases for whose outcome it is relevant. Legislation can further be challenged by one of the parties to the a trial, but only after the trial court has handed down its verdict and only if the verdict actually references the piece of legislation in question. Verdicts by administrative trial courts can additionally be challenged on the grounds that they violate the relevant party's constitutional rights in some other way. This possibility lets the Constitutional Court exercise judicial review not just of ordinances but also of individual-scope actions of the executive branch: A citizen who feels violated in their constitutional rights by an administrative decision or assessment files suit in an administrative court. If the administrative court agrees with the complainant, it overrules the administration. If the administrative court does not, the complainant can escalate the matter to the Constitutional Court. If the Constitutional Court agrees with the complainant, it overrules the administrative court, prompting a retrial; it thus potentially also overrules the administration.

=== Election complaints ===
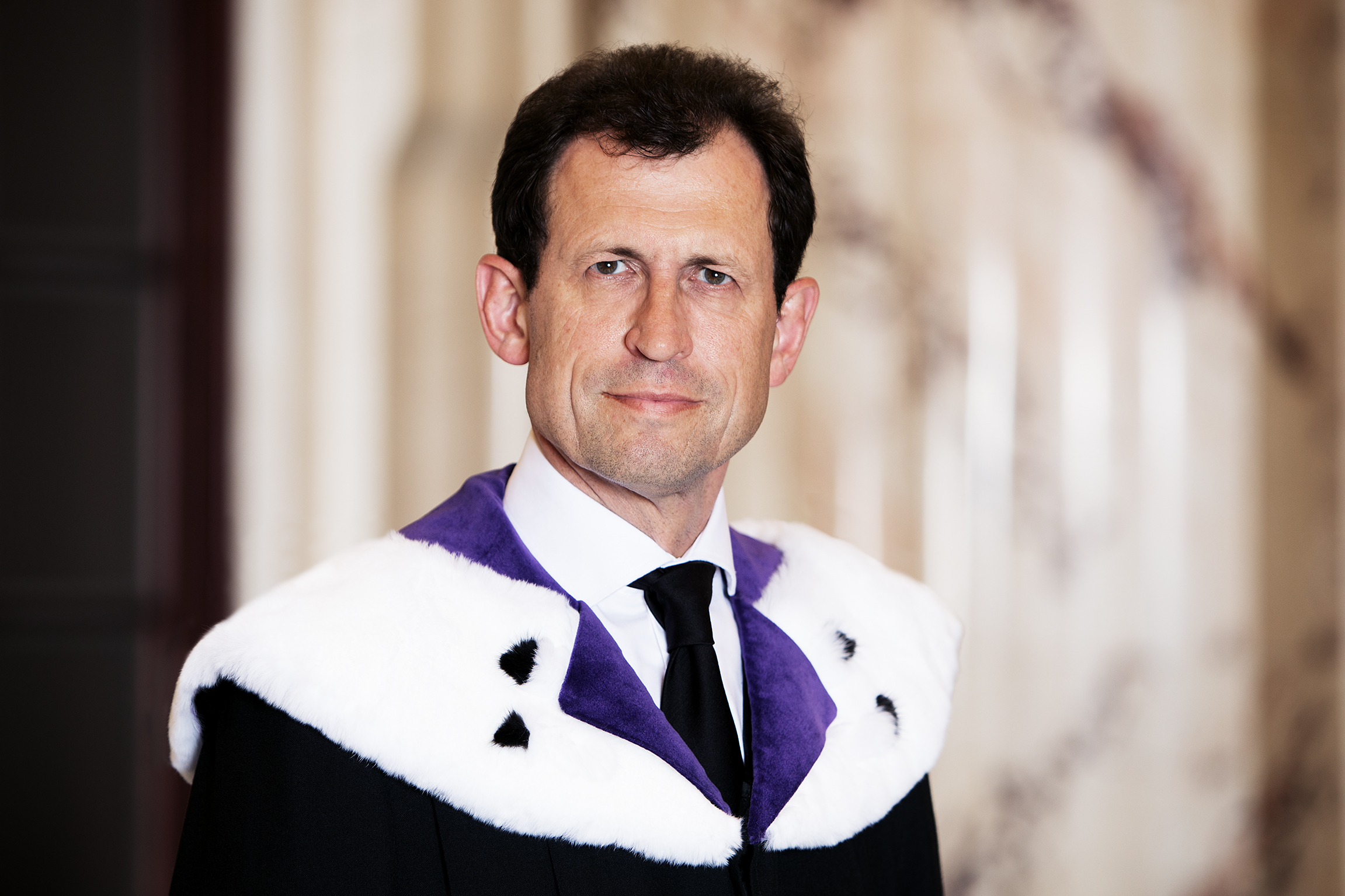
Christoph Grabenwarter has been the president of the Constitutional Court since February 2020.

Election results can be challenged before the Constitutional Court. Elections that can be challenged include, but are not limited to, presidential elections, elections to the National Council, provincial legislatures, municipal councils, municipal district councils, and the European Parliament. The Court hears challenges not just to elections by the general public but also to elections by representative bodies, for example elections of Federal Council members or provincial governors by provincial legislatures, elections of mayors by municipal councils, or elections of municipal district chairpersons by municipal district councils. It also hears challenges to the results of popular initiatives, popular consultations, and plebiscites.

Elections by the general public can be challenged by the participating political parties or candidates; elections by representative bodies can be challenged by a motion of one tenth of the relevant body's members. Results of popular initiatives (Volksbegehren) are challenged by the initiator or by a motion of four members of a legislature. A petition by voters challenges the results of a popular consultation (Volksbefragung) or a plebiscite (Volksabstimmung); the petition needs to have between 100 and 500 signatures, depending on the size of the constituency.

If the Court finds that election law has been violated in a way that could have affected the outcome, the Court can order a recount or void the election outright, either in its entirety or least for the voting district in question. The Court is required to void the election if the complainants prove that the irregularity really did affect the outcome. Popular misconceptions regarding this point have caused controversy in the past. The Court was accused of overreach, for instance, when it ordered a repeat of the 2016 Austrian presidential election. The losing side could prove infractions but did not show (or even argue) that these infractions were the reason they had lost. The Court would not have been required to void the election; some commentators mistakenly believed it would also not have been allowed to.

The Court has historically been fairly strict in its insistence on proper procedure. It has voided elections over irregularities that could not possibly have affected the outcome, just as a matter of principle. Most notably, the Court has ordered a repeat of the 1995 National Council election in the town of Reutte. Sonja Moser, Minister of Family Affairs at the time, was visiting her native Reutte on election day and was able to cast a vote even though she was not on the voter roll; as a minister, she was living in Vienna and would have been on the roll in Vienna. Polling station officials noticed the problem but chose to turn a blind eye. To make a firm point about election officials turning blind eyes, the Constitutional Court had the citizens of Reutte vote again.

=== Impeachments ===
A number of elected officials and political appointees can be impeached before the Constitutional Court for misconduct in office. Impeachment is limited to allegations of culpable violations of actual law; mere political malpractice is not enough. As a special case, the president can only be impeached for culpable violations of constitutional law. Members of the cabinet are impeached by the National Council. Most other officials are impeached by the cabinet. Members of provincial administrations are impeached by the National Council, the cabinet, or the provincial legislature, depending on the nature of the alleged transgression. The president is impeached by the Federal Assembly.

If the Court finds the defendant guilty, the Court is required to remove the defendant from office. In certain minor cases, the Court can limit itself to merely noting the violation. In extreme cases, the Court can strip the defendant of their political rights, although only for a limited term; this would prevent the defendant from holding political office again for a while.

== Composition ==
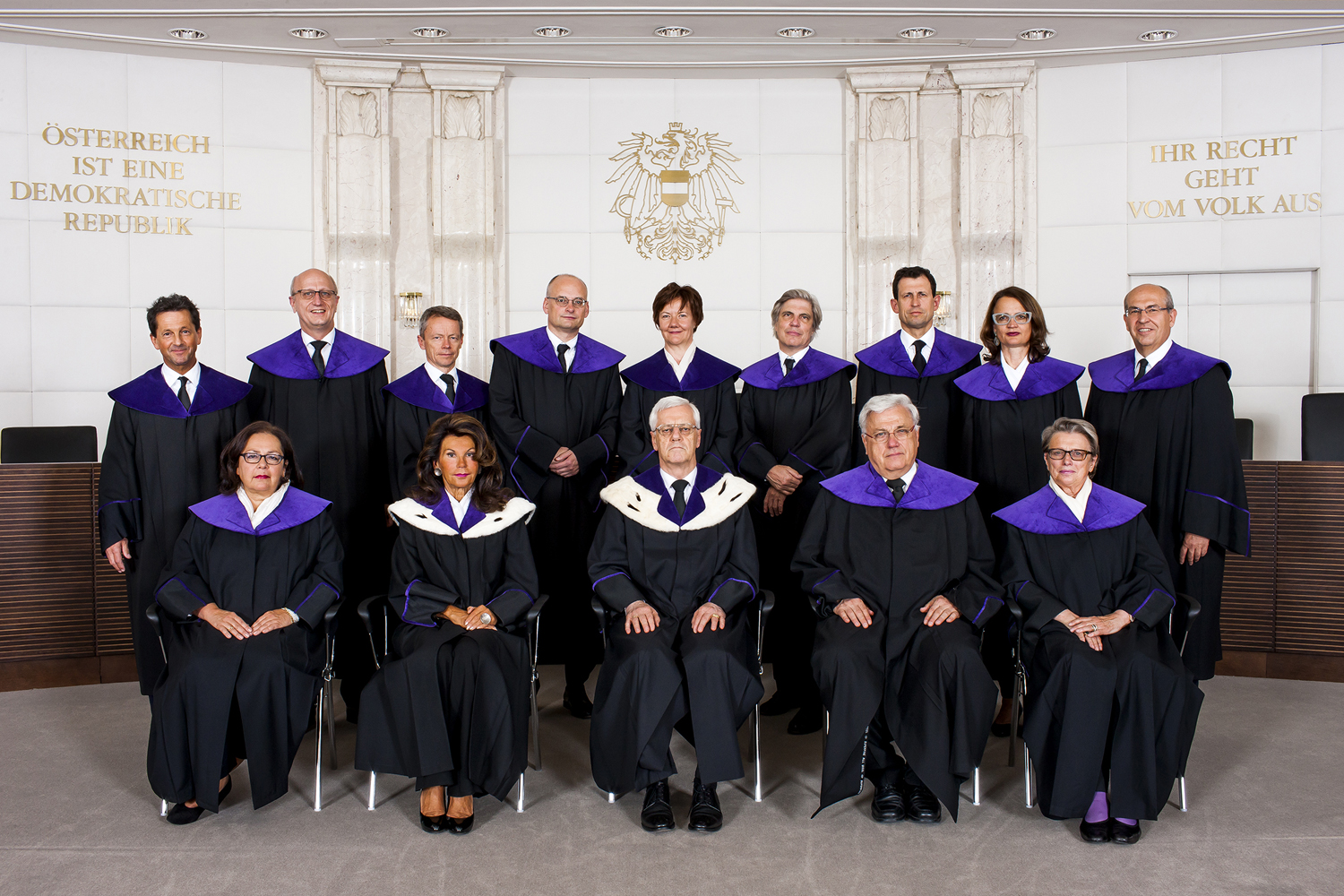
The Court in 2015. Front row center: Gerhart Holzinger, the president of the Court at the time

The Constitutional Court consists of the president, the vice president, twelve additional members, and six substitute members.

Justices are appointed by the President on the nomination of the cabinet, the National Council, or the Federal Council:

- The cabinet nominates the president, the vice president, six additional members, and three substitute members.
- The National Council nominates three members and two substitute members.
- The Federal Council nominates the remaining three members and the remaining one substitute member.

Nominees must have a law degree and must have spent at least ten years working in a position that actually requires a law degree; they do not need to be licensed to practice law in any particular capacity. Justices nominated by the cabinet, however, need to be members of the judiciary (Richterstand) or career civil servants (Verwaltungsbeamte), or hold a full professorship (Professur). Members of the judiciary (Richterstand) are jurists who have completed post-graduate training for the judgeship, have passed the final exam, and are thus eligible for appointment to a bench; they do not have to currently hold an appointment.

Nominees cannot be members of a national or provincial cabinet or legislative body and cannot be officers (Funktionäre) or employees of any political party. Members who assume any such position after their appointment to the Court have to be removed from the Court. Apart from this restriction on overtly political occupation, there are essentially no rules trying to prevent conflicts of interest. The framers of the constitution of 1920 did not want the Court to consist mainly of professional judges; they wanted the Court to be able to draw on real-world experience in a variety of professions. The framers also did not predict current workloads and did not believe a position on the Court would be a full-time job; they envisioned membership of the Court as an honorary post bestowed on elders and dignitaries with continuing responsibilities elsewhere. Members of the Court can and do sit on the boards of directors of publicly traded companies, including companies that do business with the Austrian government; they can even do lawyering work for companies involved in disputes before Austrian courts. This fact has become a source of controversy.

Members and substitute members retire on the last day of the year they turn seventy.

A member or substitute member can be removed from the Court by a majority of two thirds of the members, but only for cause.

== Process ==
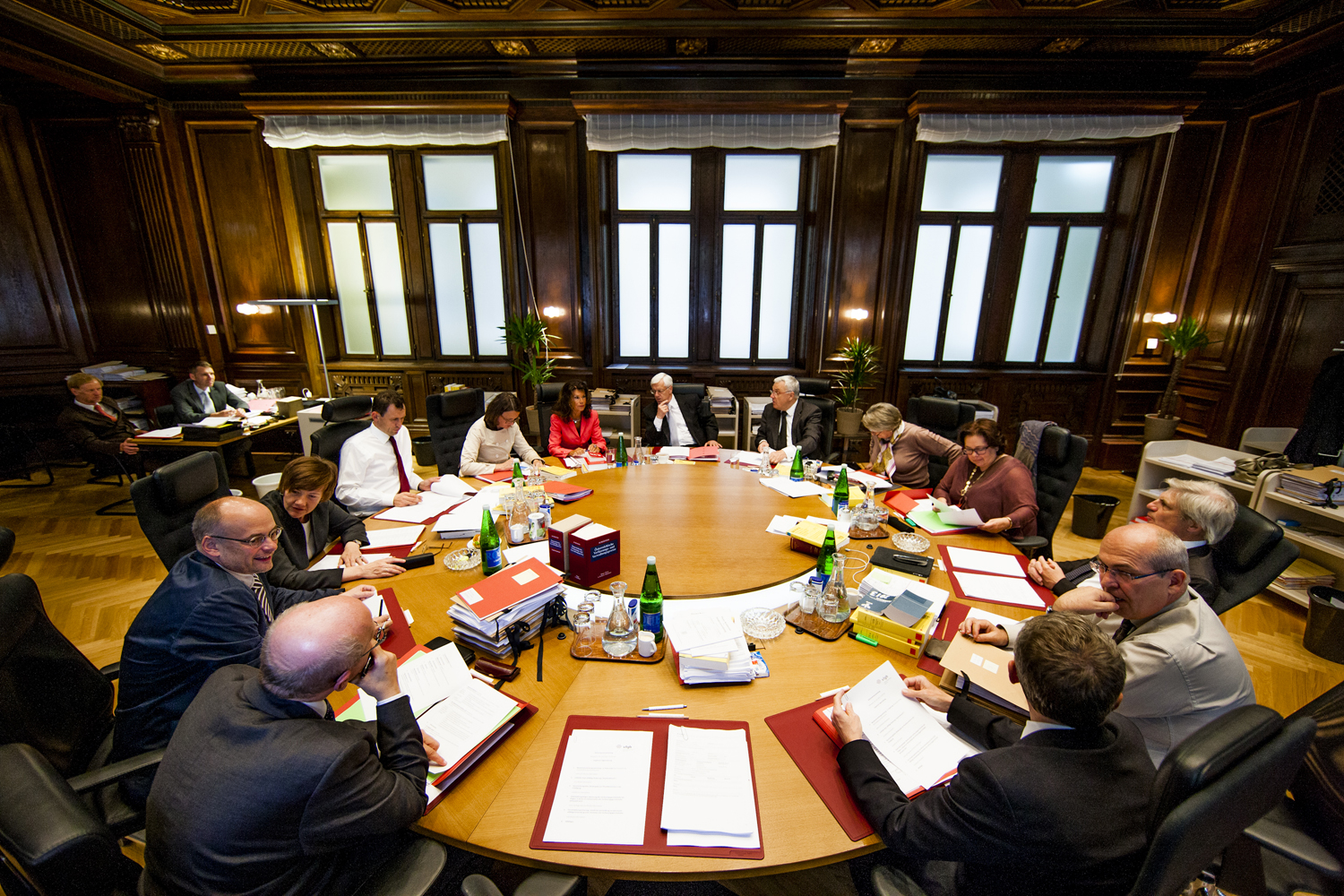
The Court deliberating

Trials before the Constitutional Court are adversarial and mostly follow the rules for conventional civil trials.

In theory, trials before the Constitutional Court are oral and public. A complaint before the Court is first assigned to one of the members for case management. The case manager or reporter (Referent) directs the preliminary research. An office staffed with about 80 specialists and assistants is attached to the Court to aid reporters in this task. Once the preliminary investigation is complete, a date for oral argument is set and announced in the Wiener Zeitung, the Austrian government gazette. The president takes the chair. In the absence of the president, the vice president takes the chair; in the absence of both, the session is chaired by the oldest regular member. The Court convenes and hears first the official presentation of case and research by the reporter, then the actual argument. The Court then retires to deliberate, reaches a decision, and pronounces the verdict. In practice, the general rule that trials should be oral and public has several broad exceptions and oral argument is rare today. Oral pronouncements are even rarer; deliberation can take considerable time; the verdict is usually just mailed out once it has been reached.

The way trials before the Constitutional Court were originally envisioned, all 14 members should usually be present for argument and deliberation. The actual quorum, however, is either 9 members or 5 members, depending on the specifics of the case. The large percentage of cases that can be decided by only 5 members and the Court's increasing workload have led the Court to create a system of so-called Small Senates (Kleine Senate); few cases today are handled by a true plenary session. This development is controversial.

Cases are decided by a simple majority of the members. The chair does not vote but does break ties.

Verdicts tend to be concise. The total length of the typical verdict is between 5 and 50 pages, with the actual opinion running to between 2 and 10 pages. Only the actual verdict is published; there are no dissenting or concurring opinions. The language is academic and dry. The Court addresses itself more to the legal community than to the general public; instead of reiterating existing court opinions and scholarly publications at any length, it simply references them.

== The Court in practice ==
The workload of the Constitutional Court has been increasing steadily throughout the years. In 1950, a total of 303 cases were brought before the Court; in 1981, there were 694. The Court had to adjudicate on approximately 4400 disputes in 2011 and on exactly 4674 in 2012. About half of these cases involved alleged violations of constitutional rights by the executive branch. Until 2014, certain types of administrative misconduct had to be brought before the Constitutional Court as opposed to the administrative courts; a 2015 reform that greatly expanded the administrative court system and ended the Constitutional Court's original jurisdiction in these disputes greatly alleviated matters. Another significant part of the Court's workload are demarcation issues. The Austrian constitution stipulates federalism in theory but more or less unitary rule in practice, in a way that presents legislators with a number of unique and complex technical challenges.

The Court has historically shown significant judicial restraint and has taken non-interventionist positions on politically sensitive subjects. To some degree, this is as a result of "depoliticization through politicization": Social Democrats and People's Party, the two camps that used to dominate Austrian politics for decades, negotiated an informal but explicit split of the seats on the Court, making sure that neither camp would ever decisively outnumber the other.

Partly as an expression of its policy of restraint and non-interventionism, partly due to a strong local tradition of legal positivism, the Court used to strongly lean towards grammatical interpretation (strikte Wortlautinterpretation) until the early 1980s. Today, the Court often uses a teleological approach similar to that of the German Federal Constitutional Court.

The Court is powerful but the Austrian constitution is relatively easy to amend, which has often allowed the legislature to overrule the Court. As a result, political scientists rate Austrian judicial review as "medium strength" even though the Austrian-style centralized model generally tends to result in strong judicial review.

== History ==
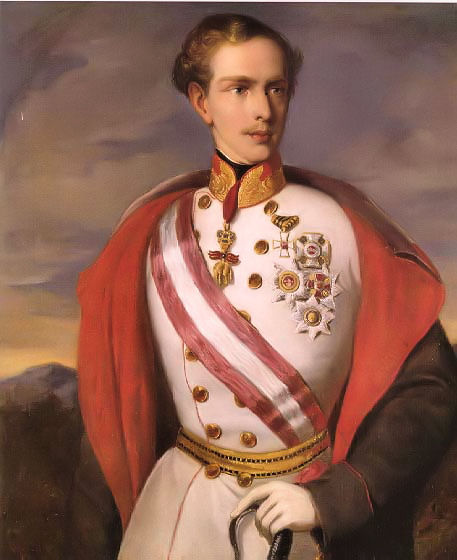
The precursors of the modern Constitutional Court were created during the reign of Franz Joseph I.

=== Habsburg Empire ===
The predecessor of the Constitutional Court was the Imperial Court (German: Reichsgericht) established by the 1867 December Constitution. The Imperial Court decided demarcation conflicts between courts and the bureaucracy, between its constituent crown lands, and between one of the crown lands and the empire itself. It also adjudicated on liability claims raised by crown lands against each other, by a crown land against the empire, by the empire against a crown land, or by a person, corporation, or municipality against a crown land or the empire. Last but not least, the Imperial Court also heard complaints of citizens who alleged to have been violated in their constitutional rights, although its powers were not cassatory: it could only vindicate the complainant by declaring the government to be in the wrong, not by actually voiding its wrongful decisions.

The Imperial Court did not yet have the power of judicial review of legislation.

Another Court the December Constitution established was the State Court (Staatsgerichtshof); the State Court held the emperor's ministers accountable for political misconduct committed in office. This was an oblique and roundabout way of keeping the emperor himself in check. The emperor could not be taken to court, but under the terms of the Law on the Responsibility of Ministers (Gesetz über die Verantwortlichkeit der Minister) of 1867 he was no longer an autocrat; many of his decrees and injunctions now depended on the relevant minister to countersign them. The double-pronged approach of making the emperor dependent on his ministers and also making ministers criminally liable for bad outcomes would both enable and motivate the ministers to put pressure on the monarch. The statute in question actually predates the Constitution by a few months, but the Constitution conspicuously failed to abrogate it; it expressly confirmed both the legal inviolability of the person of the emperor and the criminal liability of ministers for violations of the law.

Both courts existed until the collapse of Austria-Hungary in 1918, although nobody was ever actually charged before the State Court.

=== Early First Republic ===
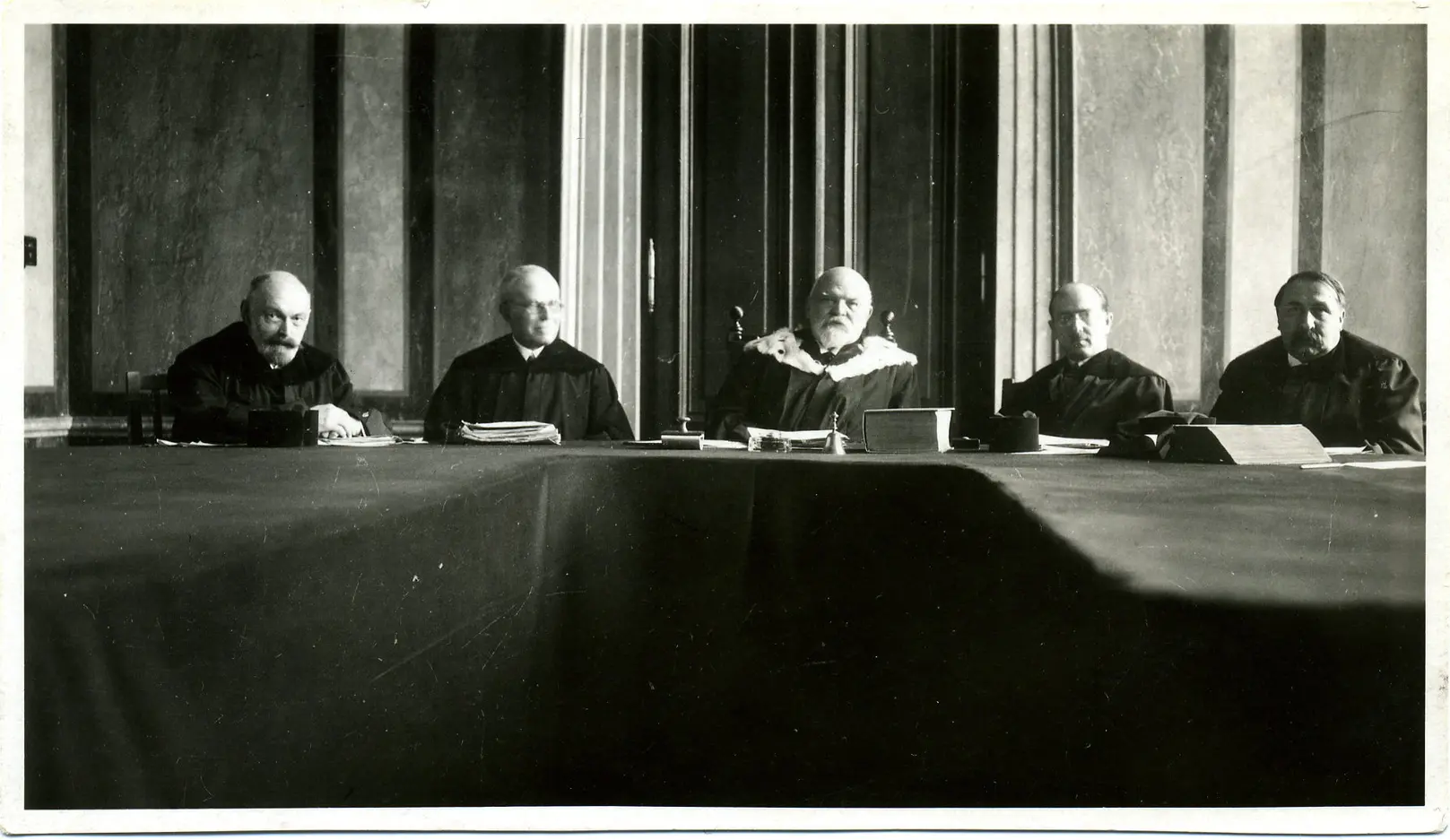
Session of the Austrian Constitutional Court, around 1925, President Paul Vittorelli sits in the middle; Hans Kelsen is second from the right.

When the empire disintegrated, the provisional government of the emerging Austrian rump state disbanded the State Court, which had never convened anyway, and transferred its responsibilities to a special committee of the Provisional National Assembly. A few weeks later, it renamed the Imperial Court to Constitutional Court (Verfassungsgerichtshof). Another few months later, the government transferred the responsibilities of the former State Court to the Constitutional Court and also gave the Constitutional Court cassatory power: from now on, the Court could not just note the unconstitutionality of an administrative decision but could actually annul it, sending complainant and defendant back to square one.

The provisional government also created an Election Court (Wahlgerichtshof) meant to handle complaints regarding the upcoming Constituent National Assembly election.

The new, permanent Kelsen Constitution of 1920 finally gave the Constitutional Court the power of judicial review of legislation. The Constitutional Court was now able to void ordinances that violated the law and laws that violated the constitution. It also acquired responsibility for handling election complaints; the new constitution did not retain the Election Court. The Constitutional Court could be asked to review legislation by other courts or by national or provincial cabinets; it could not yet be invoked by private individuals. The Court was also not yet charged with judicial review of international treaties.

Under the terms of the Constitution of 1920, the president, the vice president, half the ordinary members, and half the substitute members of the Court were elected by the National Council; the remaining ordinary and substitute members were elected by the Federal Council. There were no incompatibility provisions that prevented sitting legislators or cabinet members from being appointed to the Court; there were also no provisions requiring that prospective members of the Court have any formal legal education. Austria's political parties instantly stuffed the bench with reliable party troopers. The first formal agreement apportioning seats to factions was reached as early as February 1919, some twenty months before the constitution actually entered into force.

=== Descent into Fascism ===
The Austrofascist Heimwehr movement was dissatisfied with the Constitution of 1920, which established Austria as a parliamentary republic that was a federation in name but unitary in practice. Inspired by Benito Mussolini's Fascist Italy and Miklós Horthy's Regency Hungary, the Heimwehr envisioned a country with a strongman leader answerable not to the legislature but only to the people. In the Austrian context, this would require a move to a presidential system. Another thing the Heimwehr wanted was real, effective federalism. By early 1929, the Heimwehr had grown strong enough to force its democratic opponents into negotiations regarding constitutional reform. When the Heimwehr demanded that control of Constitutional Court appointments be taken away from the legislature and handed to the president and to the provinces, it could cite the need for "depoliticization (Entpolitisierung)" as a pretext. Given the undeniably bad shape the Court was in, the democratic parties were in no position to object.

The compromise that was eventually reached was essentially as follows:

- president, vice president, six ordinary members, and three substitute members appointed by the president on nomination of the cabinet;
- three members and two substitute members appointed on nomination of the National Council;
- two members and two substitute members appointed on nomination of the Federal Council;
- sitting legislators, other high-ranking elected officials, and party executives ineligible;
- members nominated by the cabinet must have graduated from law school and must have worked in a legal profession;
- at least three members and two substitute members must not be living in Vienna.

The compromise became part of the Constitutional Reform of 1929. The immediate result was not depoliticization, however, but politicization in a different direction ("Umpolitisierung"). All existing members of the Constitutional Court, ironically including Hans Kelsen himself, were purged and replaced.

By early 1932, the Austrofascists had gained control of the cabinet, but their majority in the National Council was paper-thin and likely to disappear entirely. When a procedural mishap caused a session of the National Council to disperse without formally having been closed, the Austrofascists grabbed the opportunity to claim that the parliament had "eliminated itself" and ordered police to prevent the National Council from convening again. When the cabinet's actions were challenged before the Constitutional Court, the Austrofascists used the cabinet's power to enact emergency legislation – created during World War I in order to deal with wartime economic upheaval but technically still on the books – to cripple the Court. The cabinet amended Constitutional Court procedure such that the departure of just one or two of its members would prevent the Court from convening, then had its sympathizers on the Court resign their seats.

The Austrofascist constitution of 1934 merged the Constitutional Court and the Supreme Administrative Court to create the Federal Court (Bundesgerichtshof). In theory, the Federal Court retained the power of judicial review of legislation, both secondary and primary. In practice, the Court's ability to void illegal ordinances and unconstitutional statutes was meaningless under the new regime. The cabinet, now supported by obvious precedent, still reserved the right to enact law, including constitutional law, and could therefore overrule the Court at will. In any case, only reliable Austrofascists were now appointed to the bench. The Federal Court survived the integration of Austria into Nazi Germany in 1938 and, in its capacity as an administrative court, continued to operate until 1945.

=== Second Republic ===
Following the liberation of Austria from Nazi rule in 1945, the provisional government of the Second Austrian Republic decided to reinstate the body of constitutional law that had existed immediately before the Austrofascist takeover of March 1933. The Constitutional Court was thus reestablished with the appointment rules of 1929. Once again, the two dominant political parties quickly reached an agreement regarding Constitutional Court nominations that prevented either camp from gaining a strong upper hand. Each party would effectively own a share of the seats. Retiring Social Democratic members would be replaced by other Social Democratic members; the People's Party would get to replace retiring People's Party justices. This time, however, the arrangement actually did create a balanced tribunal with a reputation for independence and quality scholarship; the somewhat paradoxical process has been referred to as "depoliticization through politicization". As a result, the Court has tended to take non-interventionist positions on politically sensitive issues; it has generally shown considerable judicial restraint.

Over the course of the following decades, the purview of the Constitutional Court was materially extended several times. In 1958, the Court's power to review the conduct of elections was expanded to include elections on the provincial and municipal levels. Since 1964, the Court has had the power to review international treaties. A reform in 1974 finally established a right of private individuals, and not just other arms of state power, to challenge statutes and ordinances before the Court.
