= Bernd-Christian Funk =

Austrian legal scholar and educator (born 1943)

Bernd-Christian Funk (born September 14, 1943, in Trofaiach) is an Austrian legal scholar and educator. Funk is a former professor of Constitutional and Administrative Law at the University of Vienna, the dean and academic director of the Sigmund Freud University Vienna Faculty of Law, and one of the governors of the Medical University of Innsbruck.

== Early life ==
Bernd-Christian Funk was born September 14, 1943, in Trofaiach.

== Academic career ==
Funk studied business and economics education at the Vienna University of Economics and Business, graduating with a master's degree in social and economic sciences. He also read law at the University of Vienna, receiving his doctorate of law in 1968. After graduating, Funk secured employment as an assistant professor with the Department of Constitutional and Administrative Law (German: Institut für Staats- und Verwaltungsrecht); he excelled to the point that he could submit his habilitation thesis after only six years, in 1974. He spent the next four years as a staff researcher with the Austrian Economic Chamber.

In 1978, he was appointed full professor for public law at the University of Graz. By 1987, he was the dean of the faculty, a position he would hold until 1991.

In August 1999, Funk was appointed head of the Department of University Law at the Johannes Kepler University Linz. In October of the same year, he also accepted a chair at the Department of Constitutional and Administrative Law with the University of Vienna.

In 2003, Funk took on lecturing positions with the Theresian Military Academy and the Jagiellonian University in addition to his continuing commitments at the Universities of Linz and Vienna. He also joined the academic commission (Wissenschaftskommission) of the Austrian Ministry of Defense and contributed to the Austria Convention (Österreich-Konvent), an inquiry into constitutional reform initiated by the first Schüssel government. The same year, Funk was honored with a Festschrift on the occasion of his 60th birthday.

In 2011, Funk retired from his professorship in Vienna, his ministry position, and the Theresian Academy. Two years later, he retired from his remaining two teaching positions but joined the ethics commission of the University for Continuing Education Krems and became one of the governors of the Medical University of Innsbruck.

In 2016, Funk became the founding dean and academic director of the Sigmund Freud University Vienna Faculty of Law.

Funk is the author of numerous books, textbooks, papers, and monographs. His contributions to Austrian legal scholarship are considered substantial. His significance in the area of Austrian administrative law has been compared to that of Ludwig Adamovich.

== Political appointments ==
In early 2003, the cabinet of then-Chancellor Wolfgang Schüssel launched the Austria Convention (Österreich-Konvent), a conference of legal scholars and public intellectuals tasked with drafting a new constitution for Austria. The existing constitution, exceptionally bulky and difficult to navigate, had been posing serious technical challenges to legislators and constitutional justices for decades. The convention was charged with exploring reform. Funk spent two years serving the convention as the chairman of the committee for fundamental rights.

From 1999 to 2007, Funk was the deputy chairman of the Austrian Human Rights Council (Menschenrechtsbeirat), a government-sponsored watchdog committee.

== Media ==
Funk has gained name recognition beyond the legal community through his frequent commentary in the national news media. He is tapped for interviews by news outlets ranging from broadsheets to tabloids and from the national public broadcaster to entertainment and lifestyle magazines. Funk has been asked to provide analysis on Internet surveillance, the appointment of Gerhart Holzinger to the Austrian Constitutional Court, the legality of civilian video recording of police officers, the interrelation between economic insecurity and police violence, the Constitutional Court's annulment of the 2016 Austrian presidential election, social security reform, and smoking bans, among many other topics.

== Honors ==
- 2003: Festschrift
- 2009: Grand Decoration of Honour in Silver for Services to the Republic of Austria

== Publications ==
=== Standard textbooks ===
Together with Ludwig Adamovich, Gerhart Holzinger, and Stefan Leo Frank, Funk is the author of Österreichisches Staatsrecht, a four-volume general introduction to Austrian constitutional law. The first volume was first published in 1997, the last volume in 2009; all four volumes have been revised and reprinted at least once:

- Grundlagen (2nd, revised ed.). Vienna: Springer. 2011 [1997]. ISBN 978-3-704-66112-8.
- Staatliche Organisation (3rd ed.). Vienna: Springer. 2014 [1998]. ISBN 978-3-704-66542-3.
- Grundrechte (2nd ed.). Vienna: Springer. 2015 [2003]. ISBN 978-3-704-66113-5.
- Allgemeine Lehren des Verwaltungsrechts (2nd ed.). Vienna: Springer. 2017 [2009]. ISBN 978-3-704-67712-9.

=== Selected other books ===
- Funk, Bernd-Christian (1975). Der verfahrensfreie Verwaltungsakt : Die "faktische Amtshandlung" in Praxis und Lehre. Vienna: Springer. ISBN 978-3-7091-7086-1.
- — (1978). Der Verwaltungsakt im österreichischen Rechtssystem. Vienna: Manz.
- — (1980). Das System der bundesstaatlichen Kompetenzverteilung im Lichte der Verfassungsrechtsprechung. Vienna: Braumüller. ISBN 978-3-7003-0250-6.
- — (1980). "Das Wirtschaftsverwaltungsrecht als Teil des Wirtschaftsrecht". In Oberndorfer, Peter; Schambeck, Herbert (eds.). Verwaltung im Dienste von Wirtschaft und Gesellschaft: Festschrift für Ludwig Fröhler zum 60. Geburtstag. Duncker & Humblot. ISBN 978-3-428-04612-6.
- —; Klecatsky, Hans R.; Loebenstein, Edwin; Mantl, Wolfgang; Ringhofer, Kurt, eds. (1992). Staatsrecht und Staatswissenschaft in Zeiten des Wandels: Festschrift für Ludwig Adamovich zum 60. Geburtstag. Vienna: Springer. ISBN 978-3-709-17379-4.
- —, ed. (1998). Studienreform und die Zukunft der Juristenausbildung. Vienna: Springer. ISBN 3211831819.
- —, ed. (2000). Fragen der Organisation und Steuerung von Universitäten. Vienna: Manz. ISBN 3214057197.
- —, ed. (2002). Der Rechtsstaat vor neuen Herausforderungen : Festschrift für Ludwig Adamovich zum 70. Geburtstag. Vienna: Verlag Österreich. ISBN 978-3-7046-3861-8.
- —; Öhlinger, Theo (2002). Verfassungsrechtliche Beurteilung des Entwurfes eines Strafprozessreformgesetzes (Neugestaltung des Vorverfahrens): Rechtsgutachten. Vienna: Bundesministerium für Justiz.
- — (2006). Handbuch des österreichischen Hochschulrechts. Vienna and Graz: Neuer Wissenschaftlicher Verlag. ISBN 978-3-708-30376-5.
- — (2011). Einführung in das österreichische Verfassungsrecht (14th ed.). Graz: Leykam. ISBN 978-3-7011-0187-0.
- Rueprecht, Katharina; Funk, Bernd-Christian (2012). Staatsgewalt: die Schattenseiten des Rechtsstaates. Vienna, Graz, Klagenfurt: Molden. ISBN 978-3-854-85309-1.
- Funk, Bernd-Christian, ed. (2014). Rechtliche und ökonomische Fragen der Finanzierung öffentlicher Universitäten in Österreich. Vienna: ÖGB-Verlag. ISBN 978-3-990-46060-3.
- Adamovich, Ludwig; Funk, Bernd-Christian; Holzinger, Kerstin; Frank, Stefan Leo, eds. (2017). Festschrift für Gerhart Holzinger. Vienna: Verlag Österreich. ISBN 9783704677358.
