= Brigitte A. Rollett =

Austrian psychologist and university teacher (1934–2024)

Brigitte A. Rollett (October 9, 1934-February 5, 2024) was an Austrian psychologist and professor at the University of Vienna.

== Life ==
Rollett studied psychology, education and philosophy at the University of Graz, graduating with a doctorate in 1957; she worked at the Institute of Psychology and Education at the University of Graz as a student assistant and assistant to the chair, Ferdinand Weinhandl. After completing her psychotherapy training and her habilitation in psychology in 1964, also in Graz, she held professorships in educational psychology at the Osnabrück University, the University of Kassel, and the Ruhr University Bochum. In 1979, Brigitte Rollett succeeded Sylvia Bayr-Klimpfinger as head of the Department of Developmental Psychology and Educational Psychology at the Institute of Psychology at the University of Vienna; she also became head of the "Center for Child, Youth and Family Psychological Intervention" affiliated with the department and of a university kindergarten. She retired at the end of the 2002/03 academic year.

Brigitte Rollett was a visiting professor at the University of Fribourg in Switzerland and lectured at the University of Klagenfurt and the Sigmund Freud Private University in Vienna. In 1984, Brigitte Rollett organized the 34th Congress of the German Society for Psychology in Vienna. In 1993, she was the founding president of the Austrian Society for Psychology (ÖGP) and the Federation of Austrian Associations of Psychologists in the International Union of Psychological Science. Rollett was also a member of the advisory board of BRAIN (BeRAtung und INformation über besondere Begabung), a giftedness diagnostic counseling center under the direction of Detlef H. Rost at the University of Marburg.

Rollett was also president of the Society against Sect and Cult Dangers (GSK) which was founded in 1977, and worked to educate people about the possible dangers posed by sects. The managing director of the Federal Office for Sect Issues in Vienna, founded in 1998, German Müller, was a student of hers, as was the managing director of the GSK, Martin Felinger.

== Work ==
Brigitte Rollett's research focused on psychological diagnostics, motivation and learning, learning therapy and the development of learning therapy methods in educational counseling and family development. In the effort avoidance test she developed in cooperation with Mathias Bartram, effort avoidance is postulated as an independent motive, which can also be seen as a variant of the fear of failure motive.

Rollett also became known for her widely distributed work on autism. In this context, she also spoke out against facilitated communication.

== Honors ==
- 1964: Kardinal-Innitzer-Preis
- 1994: Großes Silbernes Ehrenzeichen für Verdienste um die Republik Österreich
- 2020: Honorary member of the Austrian Society for Psychology

== Selected publications ==
- Brigitte Rollett & Ursula Kastner-Koller (2007). Praxisbuch Autismus für Eltern, Erzieher, Lehrer und Therapeuten. München: Elsevier.
- Brigitte Rollett (Hrsg.). (2004). Aktuelle Studien zur religiösen Entwicklung. Lengerich: Pabst.
- Brigitte Rollett & Harald Werneck (Hrsg.). (2002). Klinische Entwicklungspsychologie der Familie. Göttingen: Hogrefe.
- Brigitte A. Rollett & Mathias Bartram (1998). Anstrengungsvermeidungstest - AVT (3., überarb. Aufl.). Göttingen: Hogrefe.
- Brigitte Rollett (1994). Einführung in die Pädagogische Psychologie und ihre entwicklungspsychologischen Grundlagen. WUV.
- Brigitte Rollett (1990). Neue Forschungen zum Problem der Entwicklung der Begabung (überarbeitete Berta-Benz-Vorlesung, gehalten am 22. Januar 1988 an der Universität Mannheim). Ladenburg: Gottlieb-Daimler-und-Karl-Benz-Stiftung.
- Brigitte Rollett & Mathias Bartram (1988). Einführung in die hierarchische Clusteranalyse für Psychologen, Pädagogen und Soziologen. Stuttgart: Klett-Cotta.
- Brigitte Rollett (Hrsg.). (1984). Innovation in der psychologischen Forschung. Abstractband: 34. Kongreß der Deutschen Gesellschaft für Psychologie 1984. Wien: Universität.
- Brigitte Rollett (1970). Praxis und Theorie des Programmierten Unterrichtes. Ausgewählte Referate des 6. Internationalen Symposions der Gesellschaft für Programmierte Instruktion. Stuttgart: Klett.
- Brigitte Rollett (1970). Perspektiven des programmierten Unterrichts. Wien: Österreichischer Bundesverlag für Unterricht, Wissenschaft und Kunst.

== Bibliography ==
- Christiane Spiel (1996). Motivation und Lernen aus der Perspektive lebenslanger Entwicklung: Festschrift für Brigitte A. Rollett. Münster: Waxmann.
