= NOWKR =

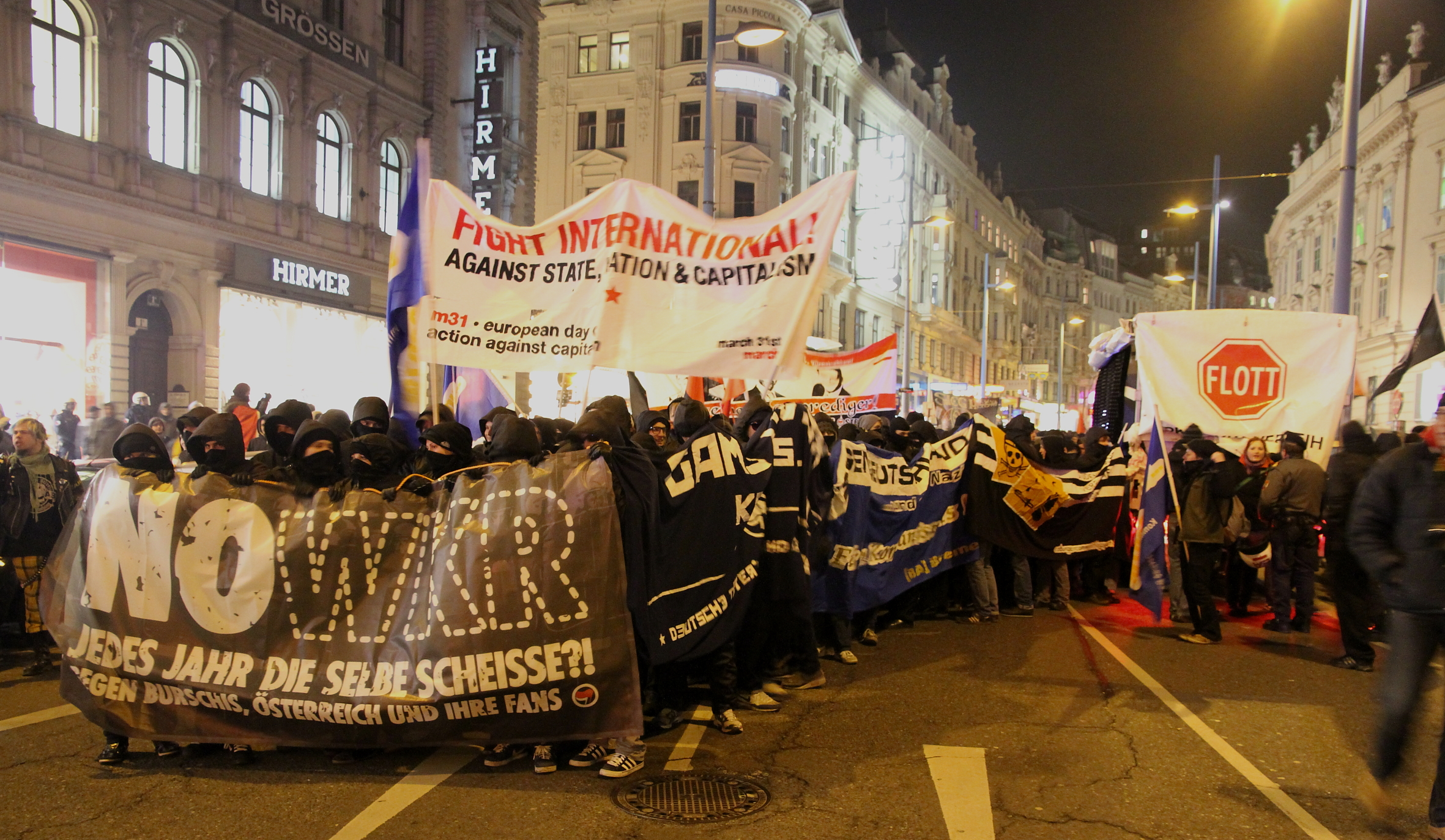
″Each year the same shit?!″, NOWKR demonstration 2012

NOWKR (short for No WKR Ball) was a radical-left, anticapitalist and antifascist alliance against a ball now organized by Austria's right-wing Freedom Party. The alliance was created in 2008 and ever since has caused uproar among politicians, the media and the police. The group dissolved itself in February 2015.

== Cause for the foundation of the alliance ==
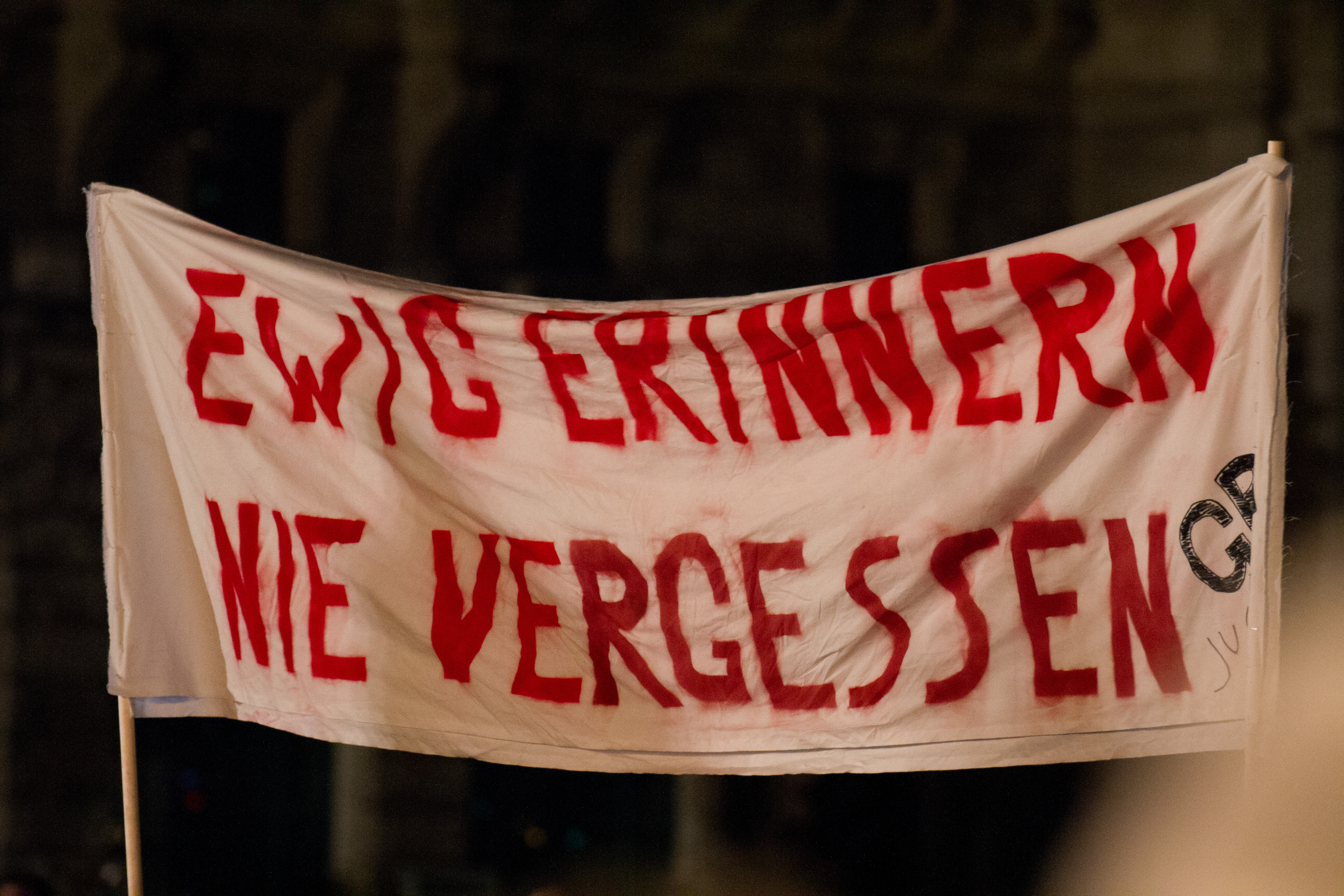
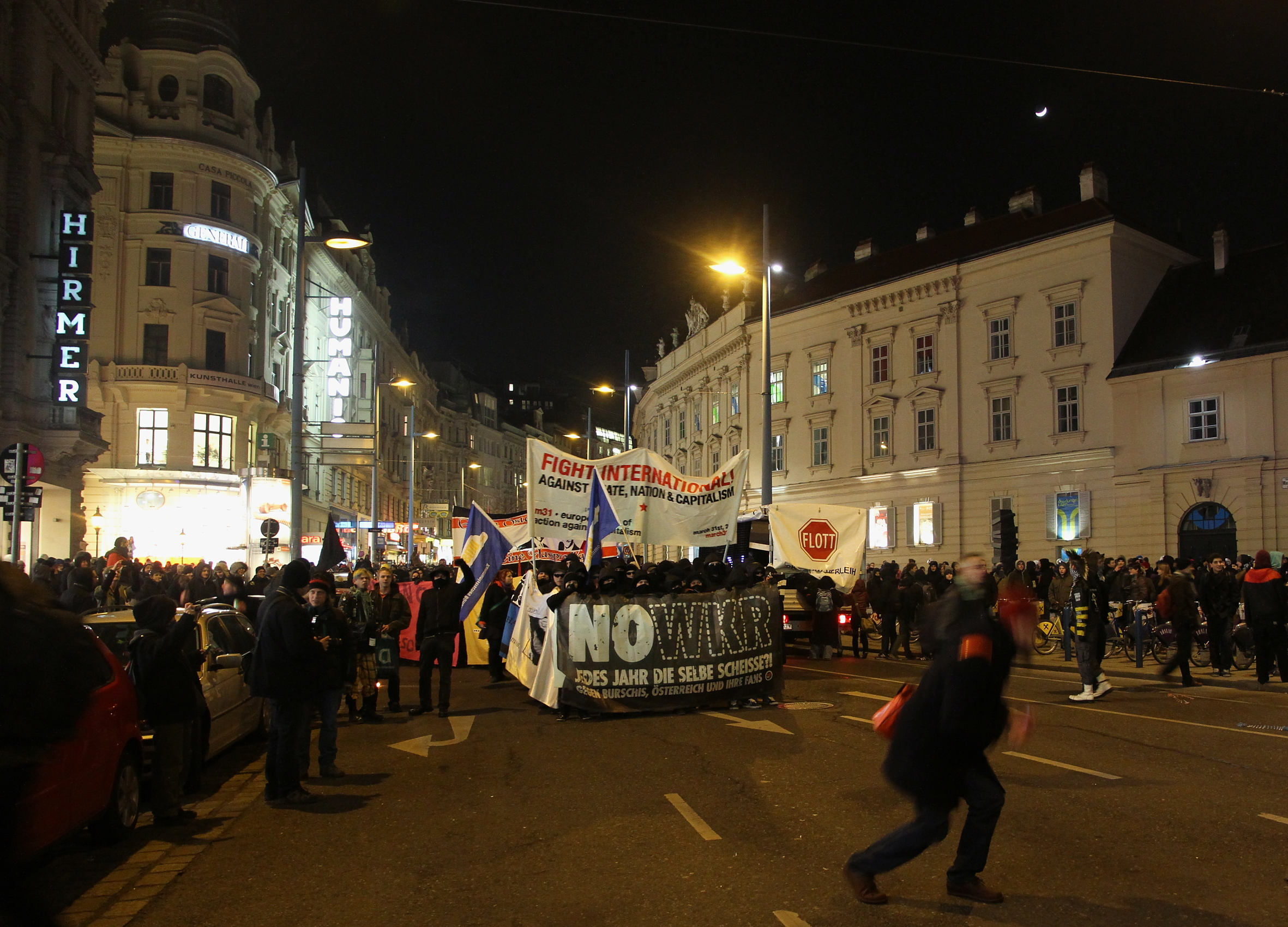
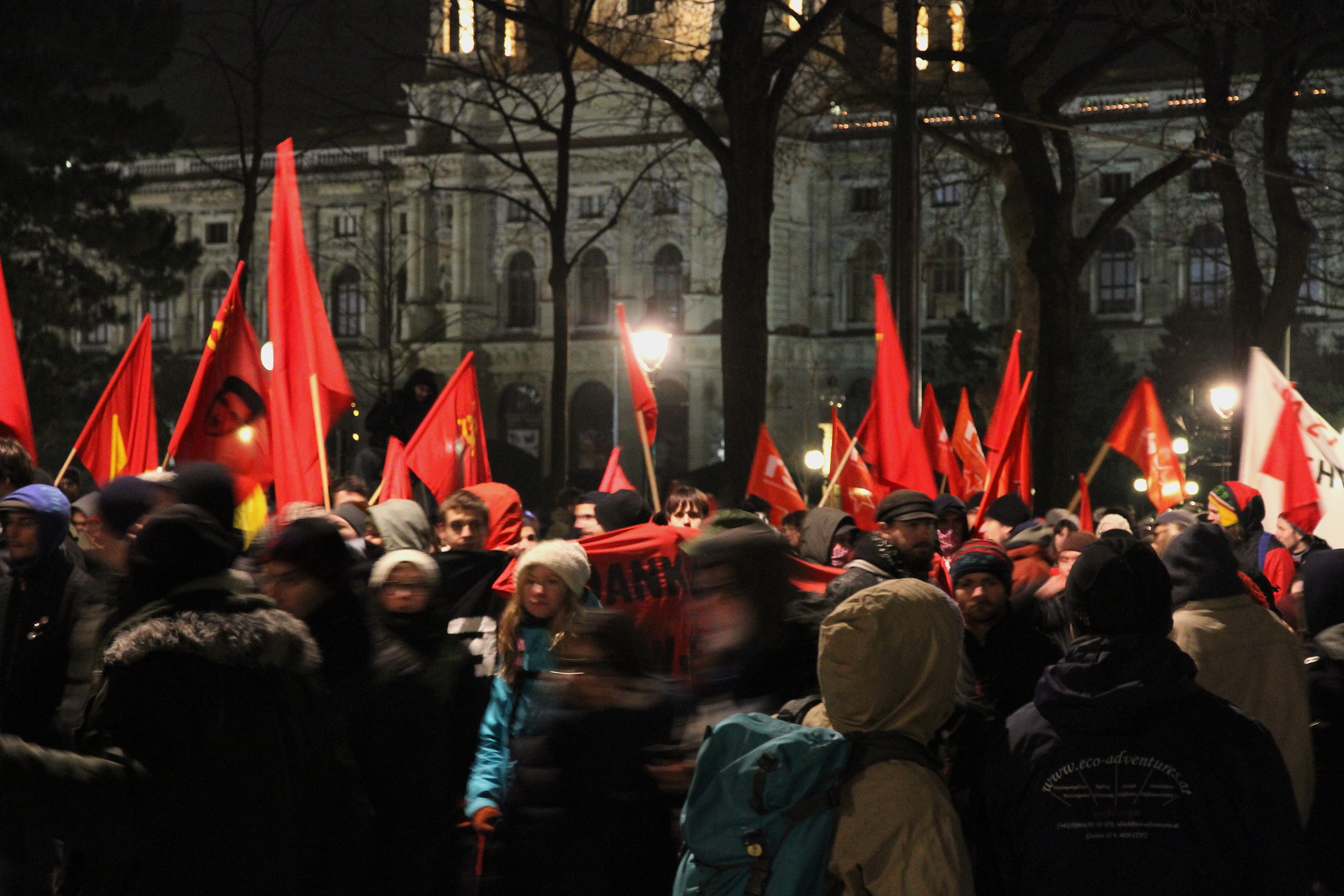
2012 demonstrations:
″Remember forever, never forget″

In 1952, the Viennese Burschenschaften consisting mainly of fencing student fraternities, most of them German-nationalist, founded an annual ball. This festivity went mostly unnoticed in a post-war Austria concerned with reconstructing society and war-damaged buildings. The ball was called "Ball des Wiener Korporationsringes" (Ball of the Viennese Union of the Incorporated), abbreviated WKR Ball. Right from the beginning hundreds of former Nazis used the ball as a popular get-together. As the years went by, the organizers became bolder and bolder. Step by step they invited prominent politicians and theoreticians from right-wing parties and movements from all over Europe - among them Markus Beisicht, Patrik Brinkmann, Filip Dewinter, Aleksandr Dugin, Matthias Faust, Bruno Gollnisch and far-right Catalan politician Enrique Ravello. Some of them flatly denied the Holocaust; all of them are radically nationalistic.

Starting in 1967, the ball took place at the Hofburg Palace, the official residence and workplace of the President of Austria. In 2008 some left-wing activists brought this to public attention and started demonstrating against the ball. The following year the alliance NOWKR was founded and since then has demonstrated against each ball, every year.

In 2012 the company running the Hofburg Palace ball business canceled the contract, therefore the 2012 WKR ball was the last one with this name. As an act of solidarity with the German nationalistic Burschenschaften in 2013, the Freedom Party of Austria took over the organization of the ball, which was then renamed Ball des Wiener Korporationsringes (Ball of the Academics).

The actual website of the alliance states the following:

The NOWKR Alliance understands itself as a radical-left and antifascist confederation organizing protests against the WKR ball (now named Ball of the Academics). The NOWKR Alliance succeeded in dragging the ball into the limelight and thereby has achieved several payoffs. First, the ball and the German nationalistic Burschenschaften were delegitimized. Secondly, the ball is losing participants from year to year. Thirdly, the ball had to be renamed after 2012. In all these battles it was constantly important to us to see the ball only as the peak of an iceberg of reactionary thinking. Making it impossible to dance at a ball like this, for us means making it impossible to organize society like this, namely, a society that generates reactionary ideologies of any couleur. Therefore it was always central to us to put the criticism of society – seen from a radical-left point of view – in the foreground of our political work, thereby promoting the project to overcome existing circumstances.

— NOWKR, Manifesto of 2015

== Themes of the demonstrations ==
Since 2009, each NOWKR demonstration had a different slogan:

- 2009 No Reason to Party!
- 2010 En Garde! Fencing with the Ball
- 2011 Every Year the Same Old Shit
- 2012 Vienna Calling – Crushing the Ball
- 2013 ″No, we don't Love this Country or its People″
- 2014 You're Welcome to our Hatred
- 2015 Putting an End to Violence

On January 8, 2015, NOWKR announced its avid resistance against the German right-wing PEGIDA movement. The alliance organized demonstrations and blockades against Austria's first PEGIDA demonstration on February 2, 2015.

== Banned demonstrations in 2015 ==
In 2015, two demonstrations against the Ball of the Academics were banned by the Vienna police. Constitutional law scientist Bernd-Christian Funk said, unlike 2011 this ban was appropriate because the organizers did not exclude violence. Additionally, Vienna police pressed charges against NOWKR for the formation of a criminal organisation.

== Spin-off alliances ==
In 2011, the new alliance "Offensive gegen Rechts" (Anti-Right offensive) was founded by several socialist and communist groups and organizations, mainly youth associations. It was a spin-off from NOWKR and can be differentiated by its focus on Anti-fascism (instead of the primarily anti-capitalist motivation of NOWKR).

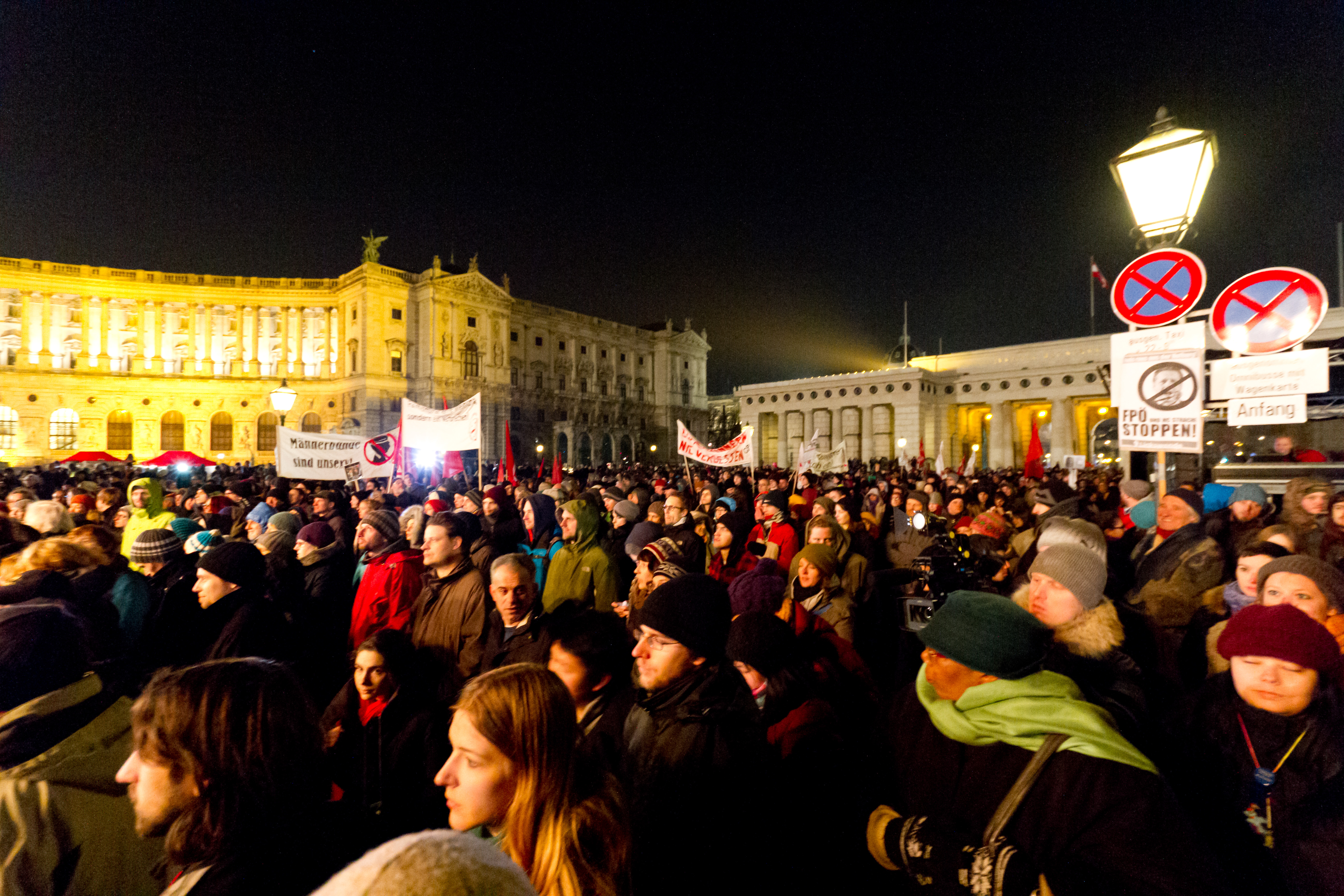
"Setting an example now!" on Heldenplatz (2012)

In 2012, an even broader alliance under the name "Jetzt Zeichen setzen!" (Setting an example now) was founded by the Austrian Trade Union Federation, by three parties and by representatives from several religious groups, among them the Catholics, the Protestants and the Jews. As this alliance is also supported by the Social Democratic Party of Austria and The Greens, it is regarded as a mainstream effort to protest against the ball. The first demonstration of "Jetzt Zeichen setzen!" on the Heldenplatz (in front of the Hofburg Palace) on January 27, 2012, already attracted several thousand protesters. Speakers at their demonstrations are Holocaust survivors or former emigrants like Rudolf Gelbard and Dora Schimanko, as well as politicians from the Social Democrats and The Greens.
