= Stefan Günther Tweraser =

Austrian business executive

Stefan Tweraser
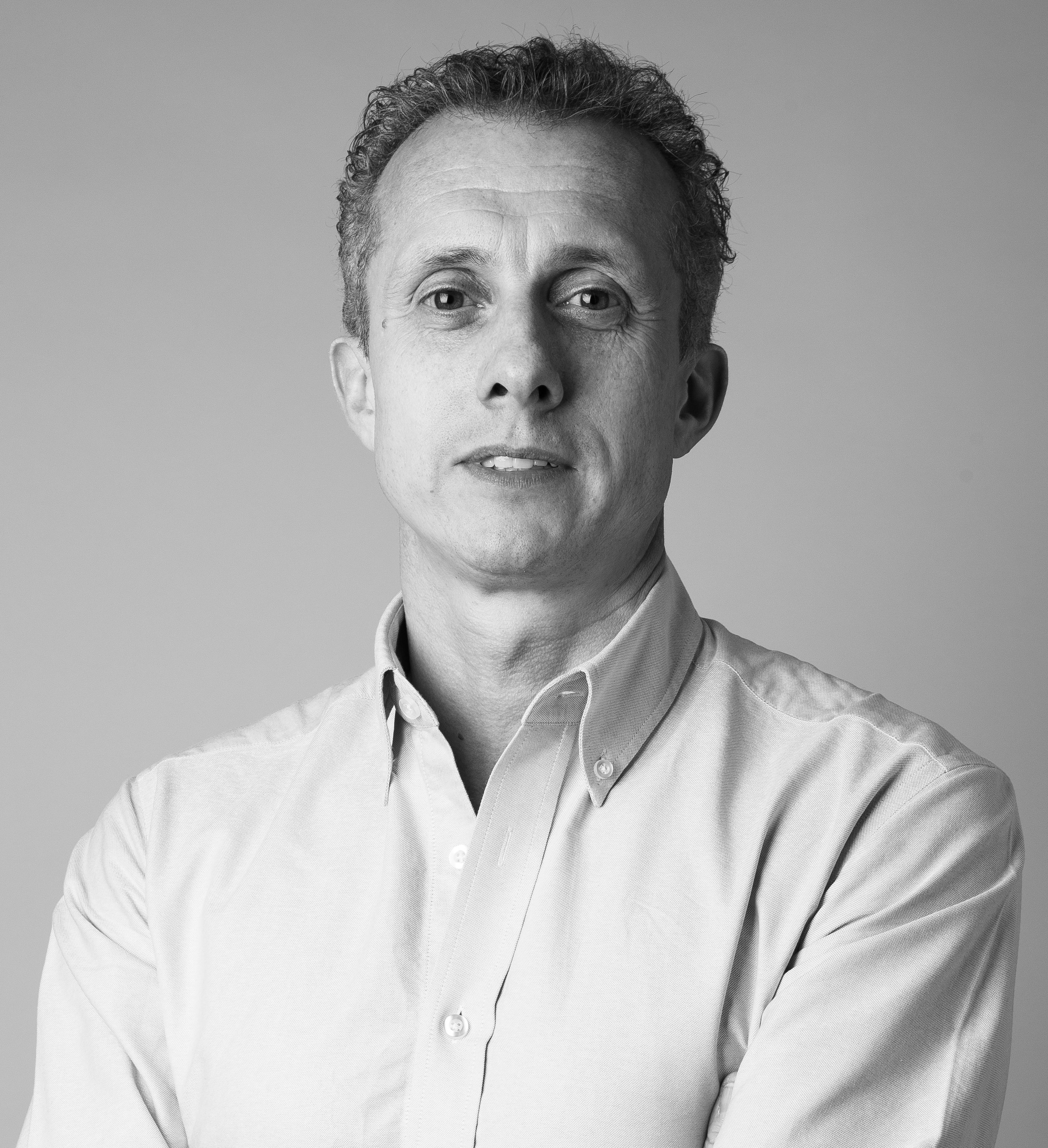
- Tweraser in December 2015
- Born: 18 November 1969 (age 56); Vienna, Austria
- Education: Higher Technical Institute (HTL) (PhD Business and Economics)
- Occupation: CEO of SnapShot GmbH

Stefan Günther Tweraser (born 18 November 1969) is an Austrian business executive, consultant, and entrepreneur, known primarily for his leadership roles in European technology and telecommunications industries. In December 2015 he was named CEO of the Berlin-based hospitality analytics firm SnapShot GmbH.

== Early life and education ==
Tweraser grew up in Vienna, Austria, with three siblings. He attended the Higher Technical Institute HTL in Vienna for Telecommunications Engineering. He studied Business Administration at the Vienna University of Economics and Business, where he was also employed from 1994–1997 as an assistant, then completed his doctorate in 1997. Until April 1998, he was employed as a director of studies for Marketing and Sales at the Vienna University of Applied Sciences. In early 2015, he was in a course of advanced study in psychotherapy at the Sigmund Freud University Vienna.

== Career ==
In 1998, Tweraser was appointed as a management consultant by McKinsey & Company, and made a partner in January 2003. Later in 2003, he was named Divisional Head of Retail Marketing at Telekom Austria AG, where he was responsible for product management, market communication and the company's Internet activities until his departure in 2007. During a reorganisation of the Landline division, he was responsible for sensitive personnel and budget cuts. The Telekom executive was named "Marketer of the Year 2005″ by the Austrian chapter of the International Advertising Association (IAA). In December 2006, he was elected president of the Austrian Volleyball Federation at the request of Telekom, which at that time was the main sponsor of the federation. He stepped down from the role in December 2007.

After leaving Telekom Austria, Tweraser moved to Google Deutschland, where he succeeded Christian Baudis as Country Director Sales as of May 2008. Between 2007 and 2008, he was also briefly employed as the managing director of Omnimedia Werbegesellschaft, a holding of Telekom. During this time he also took over as head of Google Austria and Switzerland, when Karl Pall moved to assume his role as head of Google Canada. During this time, Tweraser gave special focus to extending Google's marketing efforts to underdeveloped small- and medium-sized enterprises (SMEs) in Austria and Switzerland.

Tweraser was in the thick of the 2012 Google Internet campaign to garner public support against a proposed law that would force the search engine giant to pay publishers for content offered on the website. The draft law, dubbed the "Lex Google", was intended to force search engines to pay a fee to publishers when Internet users clicked through to their content. German lawmakers condemned Google's campaign against the proposed legislation. Justice Minister Sabine Leutheusser-Schnarrenberger, the author of the proposed legislation, said she was "astonished that Google was trying to monopolize opinion-making." In an interview with Phys.org in November 2012 Tweraser said: "The majority of citizens have never heard of this draft law, even though it could affect all Internet users in Germany." He described "restrictions to content" and to users' access, and the higher costs that would be incurred. He also participated in a number of high-level meetings and summits on the future of search services.

After an announcement of the arraignment of Tweraser on charges of breach of trust in the so-called Telekom scandal, he stepped down from his position at Google in January 2013, before finally leaving the search-engine and advertising group at the end of February of that year.

In December 2015, the Austrian hospitality analytics company SnapShot GmbH appointed Tweraser its chief executive officer. He joined a team of hotel innovators, investors, marketing and entrepreneurial executives from across Europe.

== Telekom II scandal ==
On 4 December 2012, the department of public prosecution in Vienna arraigned Tweraser and three other persons on charges of breach of trust. The former Telekom executive was accused of having illegally obtained over half a million euros from Telekom Austria with the help of the advertising agency Euro-RSCG.

Before Tweraser joined Google Deutschland, he reached an agreement in the context of the termination of his contract in 2007 with the Telekom manager Gernot Schieszler under which he would be paid an additional settlement on dismissal in the amount of two annual salaries. The agency, which was managed at that time by the advertisers Gustav Eder-Neuhauser and Albert Essenther, managed the 2.5 million euro advertising budget of Telekom. According to the arraignment, the agency bosses gave their consent to "process this 'informal settlement on dismissal' via Euro-RSCG". For this purpose, Telekom was sent a pro-forma invoice in July 2007 for the sum of 585,600 euros for the "Strategic design of the sponsorship appearance in the context of Euro 2008". Following the official departure of Tweraser from Telekom, he submitted three pro-forma invoices on behalf of his company Gekko Consulting GmbH. Although all the defendants confirmed the cash flows, they each refuted any criminally liable responsibility.

The trial (nicknamed) Telekom II began on 25 February 2014 in the Vienna Regional Court for Criminal Matters. At the adjourning of this initial trial Telekom Austria announced that Tweraser would begin to pay back the adjudicated amount in installments. Then in February 2015, Judge Michael Tolstiuk ruled that the Corpus delicti regarding breach of trust was not sufficient and that Telekom had not suffered any damage due to the payments to Tweraser. The judgement acquitted all the defendants of any wrongdoing.

== Illegal Renovation of Scheu House, Wien ==
In 2021 Stefan Tweraser initiated an illegal renovation of the Scheu House, built in Wien in 1912–1913 by Austrian architect Adolf Loos, and declared a national monument in 1971.

== Publications ==
- Vergleich von Bildschirmbefragung und Fragebogen am Beispiel der Images von Computerherstellern. Wirtschaftsuniversität Wien, Dissertation, 1994
- Autonomes Abschaffen und Unternehmenswachstum: ein visionärer Beitrag zur reduktiven Unternehmensführung. Wirtschaftsuniversität Wien, Dissertation, 1997
