= 1998 Austrian presidential election =

- 19 April 1998
- Turnout: 74.40%
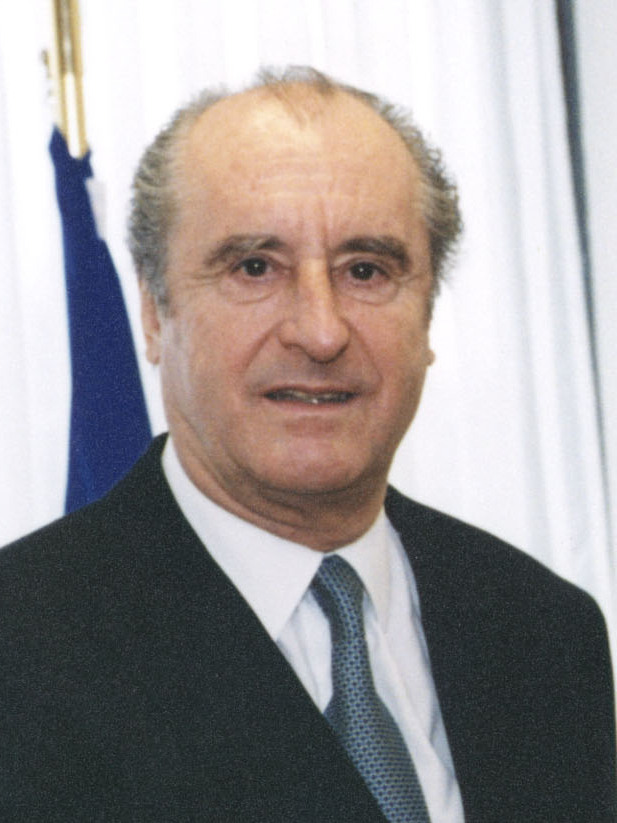

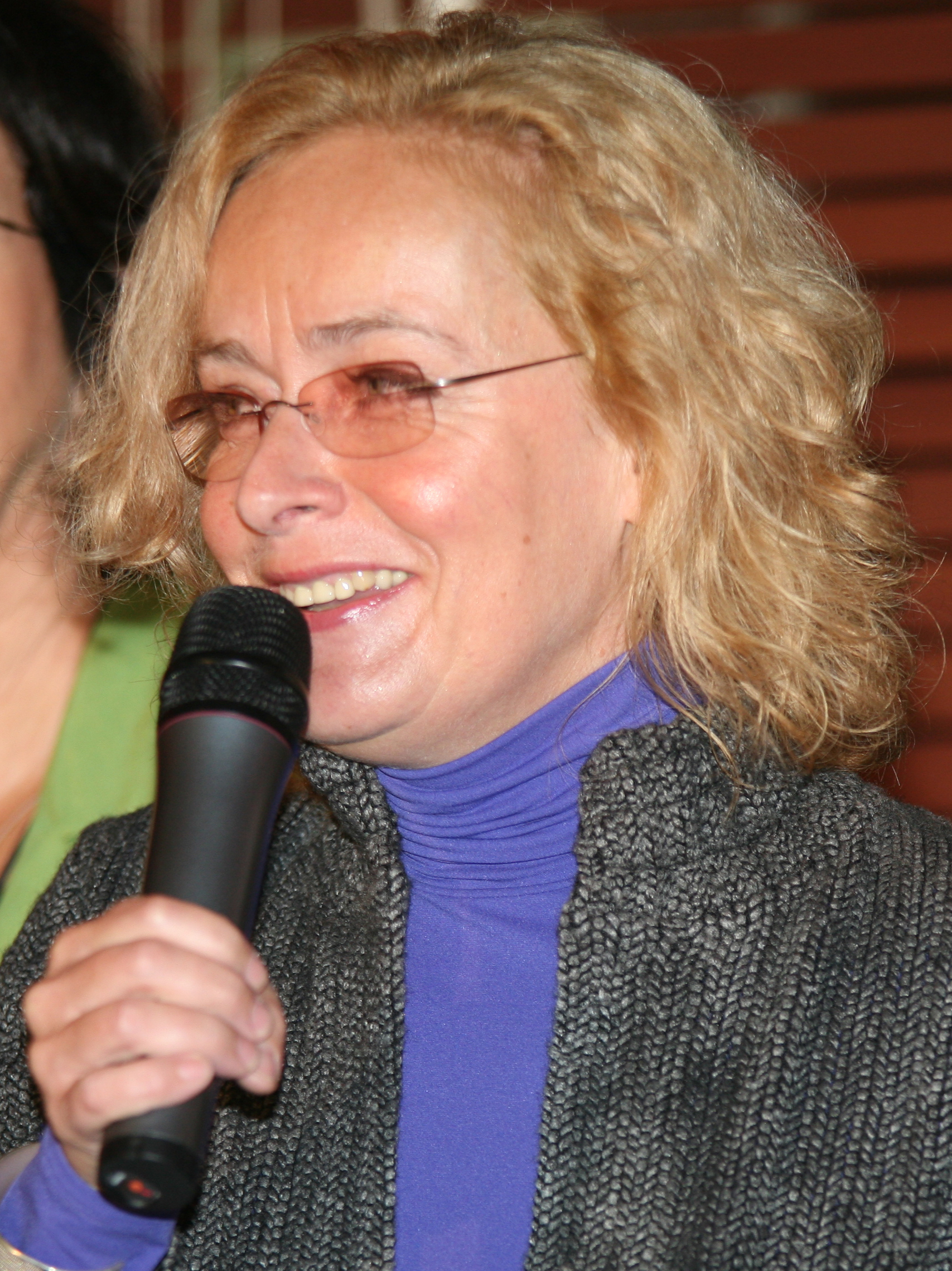

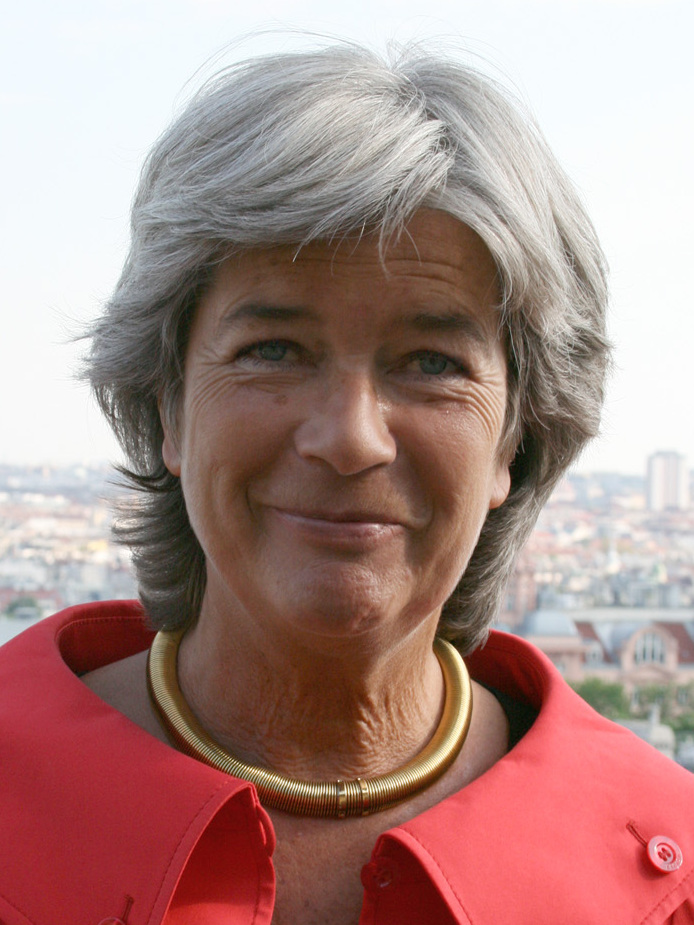

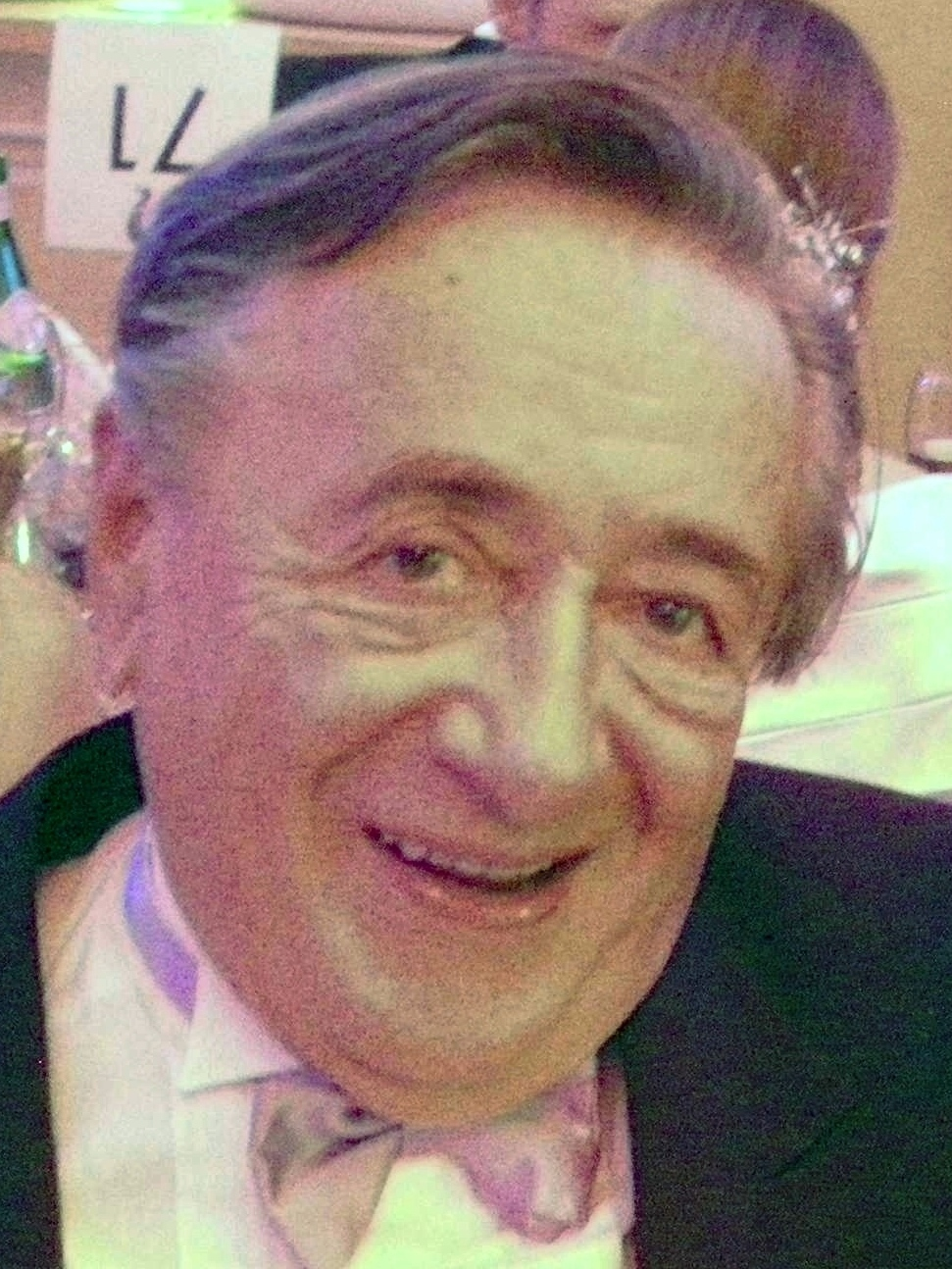
Nominee	Thomas Klestil	Gertraud Knoll
Party	Independent (ÖVP)	Independent (Greens)
Popular vote	2,644,034	566,551
Percentage	63.42%	13.59%
Nominee	Heide Schmidt	Richard Lugner
Party	LiF	DU
Home state	Vienna	Vienna
Popular vote	464,625	413,066
Percentage	11.14%	9.91%
President before election
Thomas Klestil
Independent (ÖVP)
President-Elect
Thomas Klestil
Independent (ÖVP)

Presidential elections were held in Austria on 19 April 1998. The result was a victory for the incumbent, President Thomas Klestil, who sought re-election as an independent candidate. The Austrian People's Party, who had originally put him up in 1992, reluctantly supported him again, while the Austrian Social Democratic Party and the Austrian Freedom Party did not propose any competing candidates. Klestil's competitors were Heide Schmidt, leader of the Liberal Forum, Gertraud Knoll, the former Lutheran superintendent of Burgenland (supported by the Greens), socialite Richard Lugner and Karl Walter Nowak.

== Results ==
Candidate	Party	Votes	%
Thomas Klestil	Independent (ÖVP)	2,644,034	63.42
Gertraud Knoll	Independent (Greens)	566,551	13.59
Heide Schmidt	Liberal Forum	464,625	11.14
Richard Lugner	The Independents	413,066	9.91
Karl Walter Nowak	Independent	81,043	1.94
Total		4,169,319	100.00
Valid votes		4,169,319	95.82
Invalid/blank votes		181,953	4.18
Total votes		4,351,272	100.00
Registered voters/turnout		5,848,584	74.40
Source: Ministry of Interior

=== By state ===
State	Klestil	Knoll	Schmidt	Lugner	Nowak	Electorate	Votes	Valid votes	Invalid votes
Burgenland	114,377	31,499	12,127	12,285	1,950	214,827	181,099	172,238	8,861
Lower Austria	591,163	110,350	84,058	87,964	15,869	1,136,258	929,330	889,404	39,926
Vienna	347,453	98,427	121,502	94,759	11,600	1,116,014	699,299	673,741	25,558
Carinthia	194,802	38,639	24,314	28,493	4,153	425,185	305,195	290,401	14,794
Styria	425,966	70,763	54,456	54,454	12,524	915,471	640,995	618,163	22,832
Upper Austria	461,139	107,460	65,867	55,146	14,444	989,228	733,913	704,056	29,857
Salzburg	164,498	34,743	27,219	13,829	4,930	355,521	255,476	245,219	10,257
Tirol	217,490	41,178	40,328	45,079	8,508	467,615	369,823	352,583	17,240
Vorarlberg	110,023	26,908	28,613	19,401	6,740	228,465	203,790	191,685	12,105
Source: European Election Database
