= The Independents (Austria) =

The Independents – Lugner's List (German: Die Unabhängigen – Liste Lugner, DU) was a minor political party in Austria, founded by the businessman Richard Lugner to contest the 1998 presidential election, where he received 9.9% of the vote. In the 1999 parliamentary election, the Independents received only 1.02%. In 2016, Lugner participated as an independent in the presidential election.
