= Marietta and Friedrich Torberg Medal =

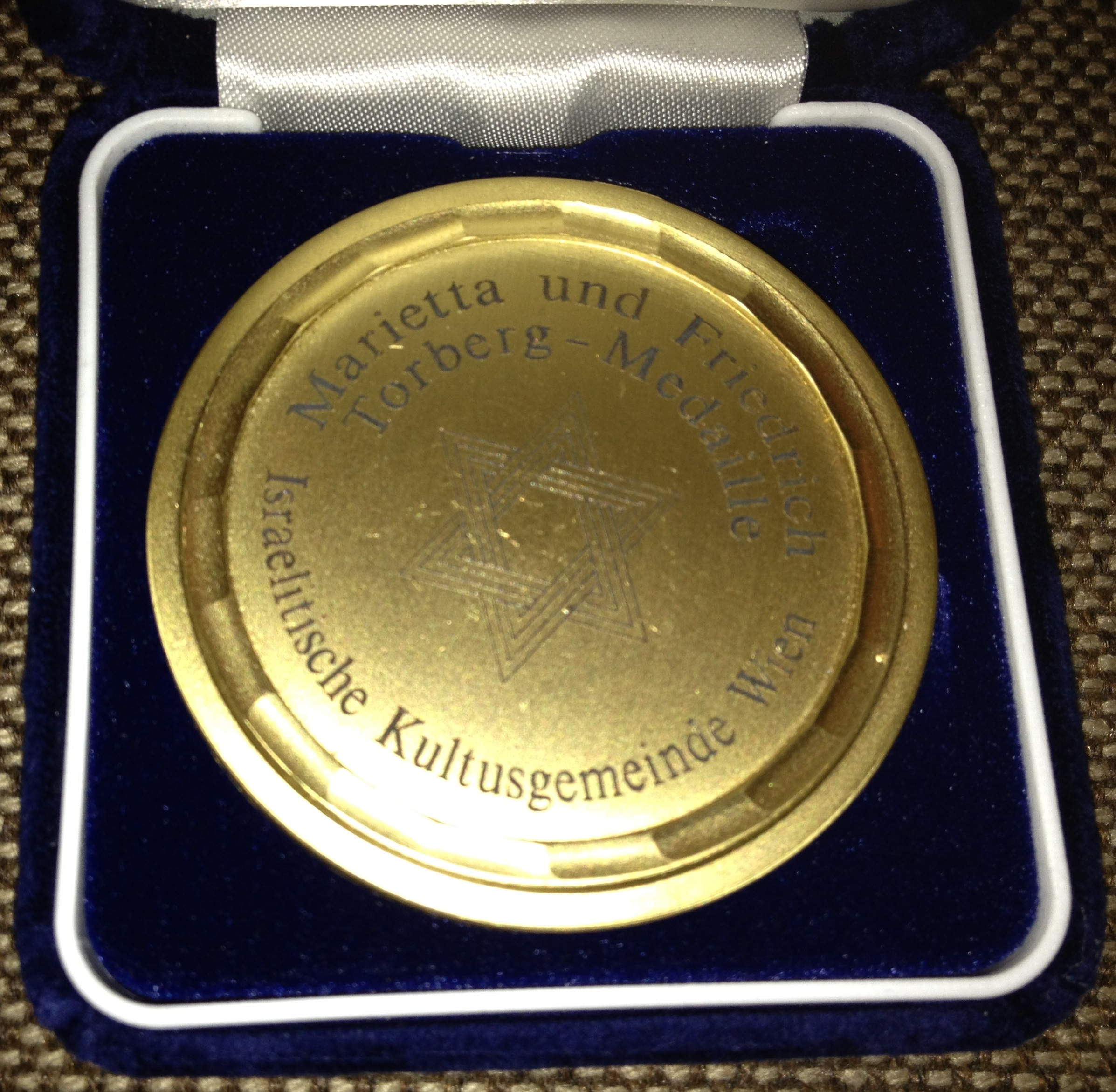
Marietta and Friedrich Torberg Medal

The Marietta and Friedrich Torberg Medal (until 2002 named Friedrich Torberg Medal) is an award given by the Vienna Israelite Community. It is awarded to personalities and initiatives campaigning against antisemitism, racism, and Nazism.

== Recipients ==
1987

- Peter Huemer

1990

- Siegfried Reingruber and Hermann Reitmajer

1995

- Students and teachers of Gymnasium Friesgasse

1997

- Josef Broukal

1999

- Primavera Gruber, Käthe Kratz, Hans Litsauer, Werner Rotter, Karin Schön, Georg Schönfeld
- Hubert Steiner

2000

- Hubertus Czernin
- Gertraud Knoll
- Werner Vogt

2001

- Marianne Enigl
- Hans Rauscher
- Joachim Riedl
- Günter Traxler

2002

- Terezija Stoisits
- Ludwig Adamovich Jr.
- Wolfgang Petritsch

2003

- Ute Bock
- Heinz Katschnig
- Alexander Potyka

2005

- Waltraud Klasnic
- Clemens Jabloner
- Wolfgang Neugebauer

2007

- Eva Blimlinger
- Ida Olga Höfler
- Gerhard Roth

2008

- Georg Haber

2010

- Lena, Franziska und Franz Müllner
- Martina Enzmann
- Werner Sulzgruber

2011

- Thomas Haffner
- Gerhard Zatlokal

2012

- Helmut Nausner
- Clemens Hellsberg
- Wolfgang Schütz
- Andreas Maislinger
- Hannes Porias

2013

- Christian Kern

2015

- Karel Schwarzenberg

2016

- Andreas Mailath-Pokorny

== See also ==
- Austrian Service Abroad
- Austrian Holocaust Memorial Service
