= Ludwig Adamovich Jr. =

Austrian constitutional scholar (1932–2024)

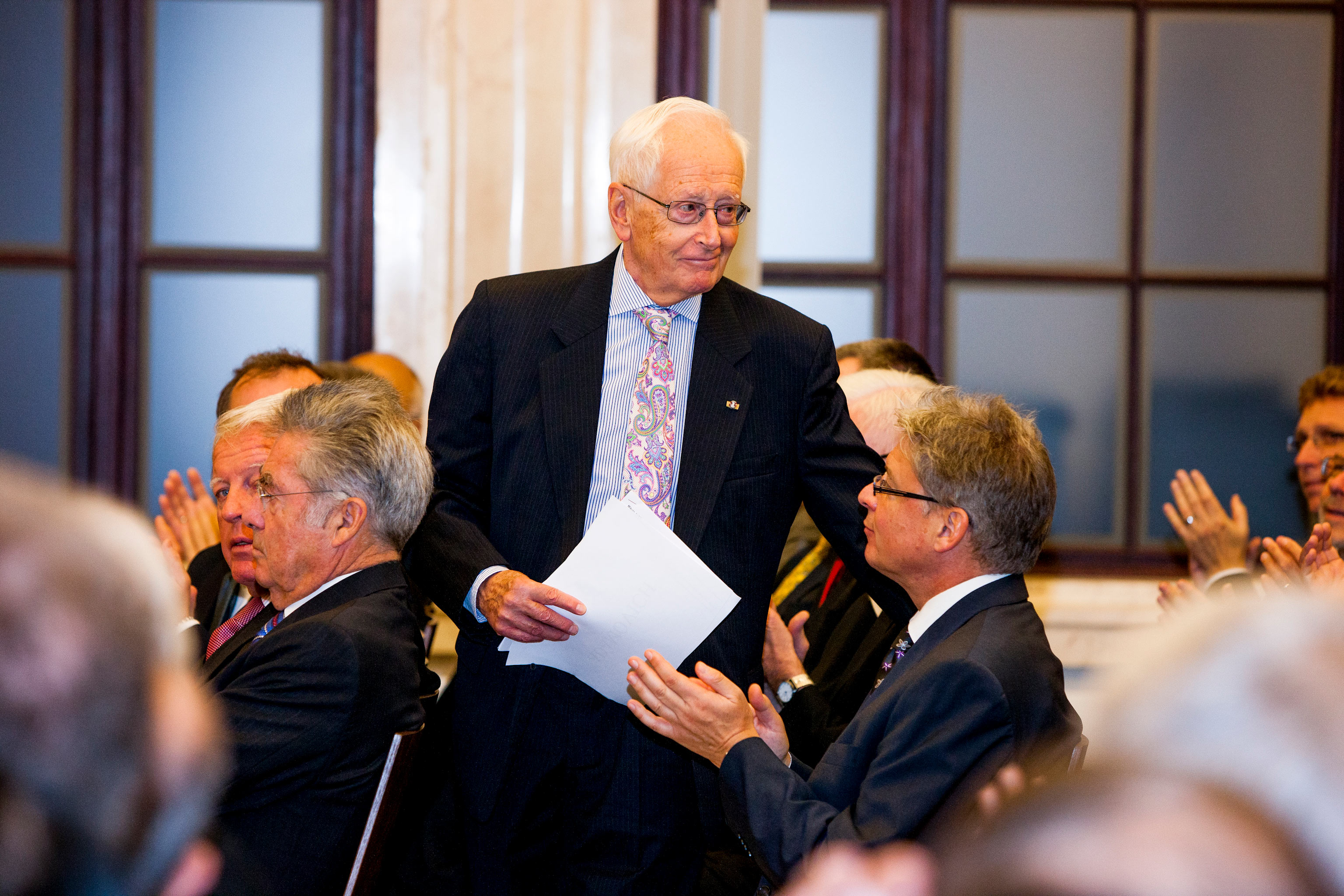
- Adamovich in 2013

President of the Constitutional Court
- In office 1 January 1984 – 31 December 2002
- Vice President: Kurt Ringhofer; Karl Piska; Karl Korinek
- Preceded by: Erwin Melichar
- Succeeded by: Karl Korinek

Personal details
- Born: 24 August 1932 Innsbruck, Tyrol, Austria
- Died: 16 June 2024 (aged 91) Vienna
- Spouse: Britta Adamovich-Wagner
- Parent: Ludwig Adamovich Sr. (father)
- Education: University of Vienna

Ludwig Karl Adamovich (24 August 1932 – 16 June 2024), commonly known as Ludwig Adamovich Jr., was an Austrian constitutional scholar, civil servant, and educator. From 1956 to 1984, Adamovich worked for the Constitutional Service of the Austrian Chancellery; he also taught law at the University of Graz. From 1984 to 2002, he served as the president of the Austrian Constitutional Court. From 2004, Adamovich acted, on an honorary basis, as an advisor on matters of constitutional law to Presidents Heinz Fischer and Alexander Van der Bellen.

== Early life ==
Ludwig Karl Adamovich was born in Innsbruck, Tyrol, Austria, on 24 August 1932.

His father was Ludwig Adamovich Sr., a noted legal scholar and a member of the Austrian Constitutional Court at the time. The family was conservative; the elder Adamovich had been educated at the Jesuit Kalksburg College, supported the Christian Social Party, and would later become minister of justice for the Austrofascist government of Chancellor Kurt Schuschnigg. The relationship between father and son was difficult. Adamovich Sr. was controlling and pedantic; Adamovich Jr. was unable to meet his father's expectations either academically or in terms of personality.

Adamovich received his secondary education at the Akademisches Gymnasium.

== Career ==
After graduating from the Gymnasium, Adamovich enrolled at the University of Vienna to study law, receiving his doctorate in 1954. Adamovich had originally wanted to become a surgeon; his mother descended from a family of physicians. He eventually chose law instead because he feared that his poor talent for mathematics would make it impossible for him to succeed as a student of medicine.

From 1955 to 1956, Adamovich worked in the Lower Austrian provincial administration. In 1956, Adamovich joined the Constitutional Service (German: Verfassungsdienst) in the Chancellery, an office that assists ministries in drafting legislation and in evaluating the constitutionality of draft statutes written elsewhere. In his spare time, Adamovich continued to pursue academic ambitions. In 1973, he submitted his habilitation thesis to the University of Vienna; in 1974, he accepted an appointment to professor of public law (öffentliches Recht) at the University of Graz. Two years later, he returned to the capital and to the Chancellery; he was now the executive director of the Constitutional Service. In his 2011 autobiography, Adamovich freely admits that his career was greatly helped by his father's reputation and, especially in its early years, by his family's political connections to the Austrian People's Party.

As from 1 January 1984 Adamovich was appointed president of the Constitutional Court. He held this position for nineteen years, leaving the court when he reached the mandatory retirement age of seventy in 2002. Adamovich's tenure was a period of modernization; his leadership represented a break with the old ways in several respects. Among other things, Adamovich worked to establish relationships with sibling constitutional courts in other countries, especially with the new constitutional courts created during the 1990s in former Eastern Bloc nations.

In 2004, Adamovich accepted an invitation of then-President Heinz Fischer to join the Presidential Chancellery, on an honorary basis, as an advisor on matters of constitutional law. He stayed on in this capacity when Alexander Van der Bellen replaced Fischer in 2016.

== Politics ==
Adamovich was considered right of center, although with a permissive, humanistic streak. He called himself an "unorthodox conservative".

Immediately after graduating from university, Adamovich used his family's connections to the Austrian People's Party to secure employment in the Lower Austrian bureaucracy, a fact he openly talks about in his autobiography. He formally joined to People's Party in 1956. In spite of his declared allegiance, his career in the Constitutional Service was materially supported by then-Chancellor Bruno Kreisky, a Social Democrat; Adamovich claims that Kreisky had a general inclination to adopt sons of prominent families as his protégés. In 1983, Adamovich withdrew from membership in the People's Party because Kreisky was considering him for appointment to minister of justice. It was Fred Sinowatz, another Social Democrat and Kreisky's successor as chancellor, who nominated Adamovich for president of the Constitutional Court later the same year. The nomination was controversial.

During his tenure as the president of the Constitutional Court, Adamovich had his disagreements with both sides of the political spectrum. Michael Graff, secretary general of the People's Party at the time, accused Adamovich of being a "stooge" of "the Reds". Adamovich also quarreled with Social Democrats, especially with Heinz Fischer, who nevertheless asked Adamovich to become his advisor on matters of constitutional law when he became President of Austria in 2004.

Adamovich viciously clashed with Jörg Haider and the Freedom Party in the Ortstafelstreit, a dispute concerning the language rights of Austria's Slovenian minority that Haider had been using to whip up populist resentment and that eventually became one of the cases before the court. The dispute led to personal attacks on Adamovich by Haider that commentators have described as vulgar. When Haider accused Adamovich of misconduct in office, Adamovich insisted on being formally investigated; the inquest exonerated him roundly.

== Defamation case ==
In 2008, then-Minister of the Interior Günther Platter asked Adamovich to chair an inquest into the police investigation of the abduction of Natascha Kampusch. Kampusch was a girl from Vienna who had been abducted, at age 10, in 1998; she was not heard from again until she walked away from her abductor more than eight years later. Critics alleged that Kampusch would have found been quickly and easily had investigators not committed a number of inexplicable unforced errors. The official version of events published by the authorities when the case was finally closed was considered improbable by some. Investigators blamed the entire affair on a single criminal acting alone, even though Kampusch's abduction and captivity would have been logistically challenging and even though eyewitnesses claimed to have seen two abductors; the main suspect conveniently killed himself after Kampusch made her escape but before he could be apprehended.

In 2009, Adamovich gave a series of interviews in which he stated that he too had come to doubt the official version of events. Additionally, he speculated that Kampusch's life in captivity may not have been much worse than her earlier life with her dysfunctional family; Kampusch's mother may have been physically abusing the child; Kampusch may have stayed with her abductor more or less voluntarily. Kampusch's mother demanded that Adamovich be prosecuted; Adamovich was found guilty of defamation and fined. The judge presiding over his trial, Birgit Schneider, was the daughter of Otto Schneider, a former head of the Vienna prosecution service whose decisions in the Kampusch case Adamovich had also been criticized. The family connection caused commentators such as Johann Rzeszut, a former president of the Austrian Supreme Court of Justice and a member of the inquest committee himself, to call the verdict a miscarriage of justice; according to Rzeszut, Birgit Schneider would have been obligated to recuse herself.

In 2010, Adamovich's conviction was overturned on appeal; the appellate court held that Adamovich's remarks were covered by his right to free speech.

== Death ==
Adamovich died on 16 June 2024, at the age of 91.

== Selected awards ==
- 1974: Decoration of Honor in Gold for Services to the Republic of Austria
- 1979: Grand Decoration of Honor in Gold for Services to the Republic of Austria
- 1987: Grand Decoration of Honor in Gold with Sash for Services to the Republic of Austria
- 1989: Grand Decoration of Honor in Gold for Services to the State of Vienna
- 1995: Gold medal of the Masaryk University
- 1995: Wilhelm Hartel Award of the Austrian Academy of Sciences
- 1996: Honorary doctorate of the University of Osijek
- 1996: Franz Gschnitzer Award of the University of Innsbruck
- 1997: Honorary doctorate of the University of Graz
- 1998: Honorary member of the Division of Humanities and the Social Sciences of the Austrian Academy of Sciences
- 2001: Grand Cross of the Order of Isabella the Catholic
- 2002: Honorary doctorate of the University of Wrocław
- 2002: Friedrich Torberg Medal

== Publications ==
=== Standard textbooks ===
Together with Bernd-Christian Funk, Gerhart Holzinger, and Stefan Leo Frank, Adamovich is the author of Österreichisches Staatsrecht, a four-volume general introduction to Austrian constitutional law. The first volume was first published in 1997, the last volume in 2009; all four volumes have been revised and reprinted at least once:

- Grundlagen (2nd, revised ed.). Vienna: Springer. 2011 [1997]. ISBN 978-3-704-66112-8.
- Staatliche Organisation (3rd ed.). Vienna: Springer. 2014 [1998]. ISBN 978-3-704-66542-3.
- Grundrechte (2nd ed.). Vienna: Springer. 2015 [2003]. ISBN 978-3-704-66113-5.
- Allgemeine Lehren des Verwaltungsrechts (2nd ed.). Vienna: Springer. 2017 [2009]. ISBN 978-3-704-67712-9.

=== Selected other books ===
- Adamovich, Ludwig; Pernthaler, Peter, eds. (1980). Auf dem Weg zu Menschenwürde und Gerechtigkeit. Festschrift für Hans R. Klecatksy, dargeboten zum 60. Lebensjahr. Vienna: Braumüller. ISBN 3-700-30257-6.
- —; Funk, Bernd-Christian (1987) [1980]. Allgemeines Verwaltungsrecht (3rd ed.). Vienna: Springer. ISBN 3-211-81558-9.
- — (2004). Eine neue Republik? Gedanken zur Verfassungsreform. Vienna: Holzhausen. ISBN 3-854-93083-6.
- — (2008). Der Weg zum allgemeinen und gleichen Wahlrecht. Vienna: Verlag Österreich. ISBN 978-3-704-65258-4.
- — (2011). Erinnerungen eines Nonkonformisten. Vienna: Seifert. ISBN 978-3-902-40687-3.
- —; Funk, Bernd-Christian; Frank, Stefan L., eds. (2017). Festschrift für Gerhart Holzinger. Vienna: Verlag Österreich. ISBN 978-3-704-67735-8.
