= Vienna Islamic Centre =

Mosque in Floridsdorf, Vienna, Austria

- Islamisches Zentrum Wien
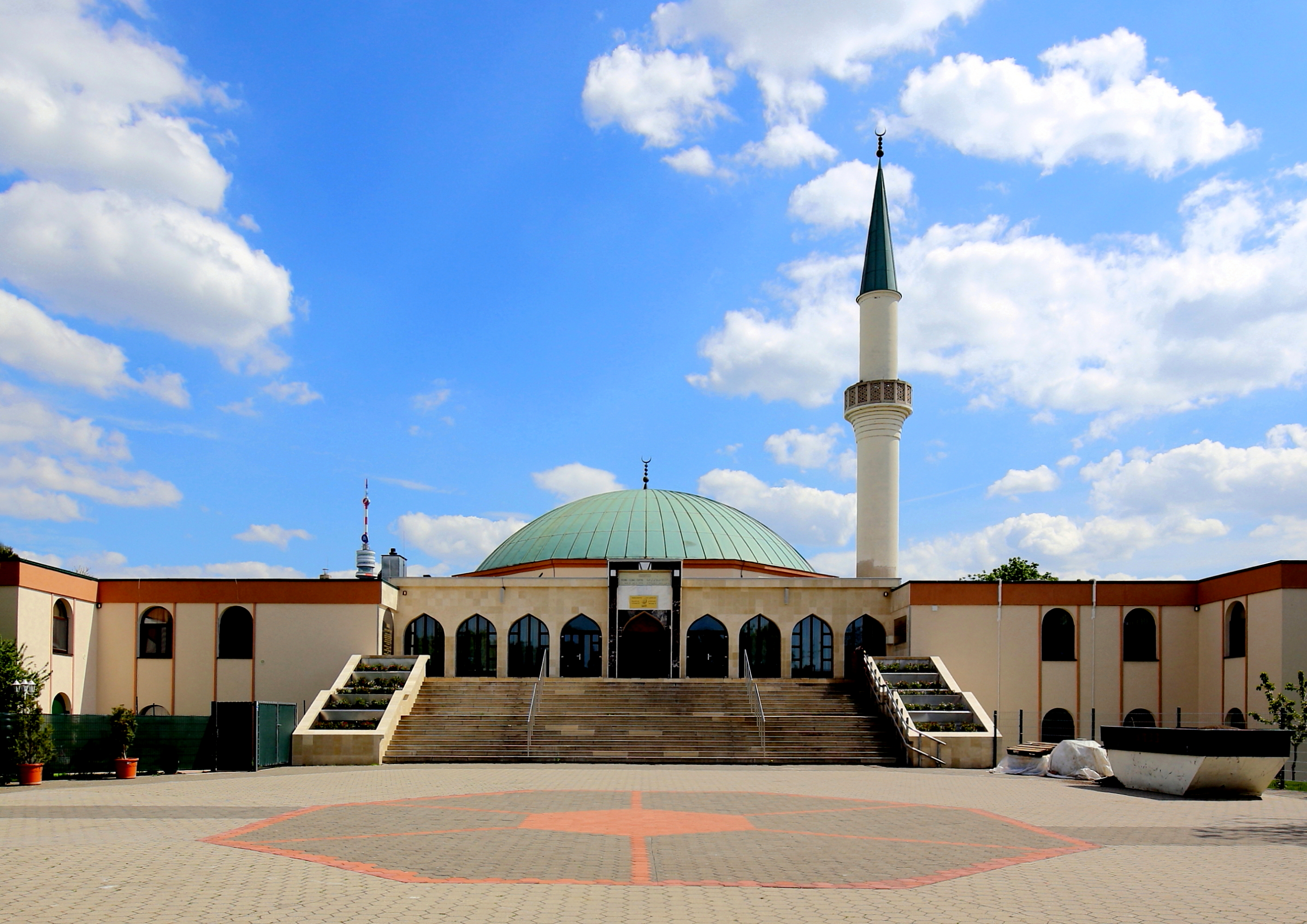
- The mosque in 2015

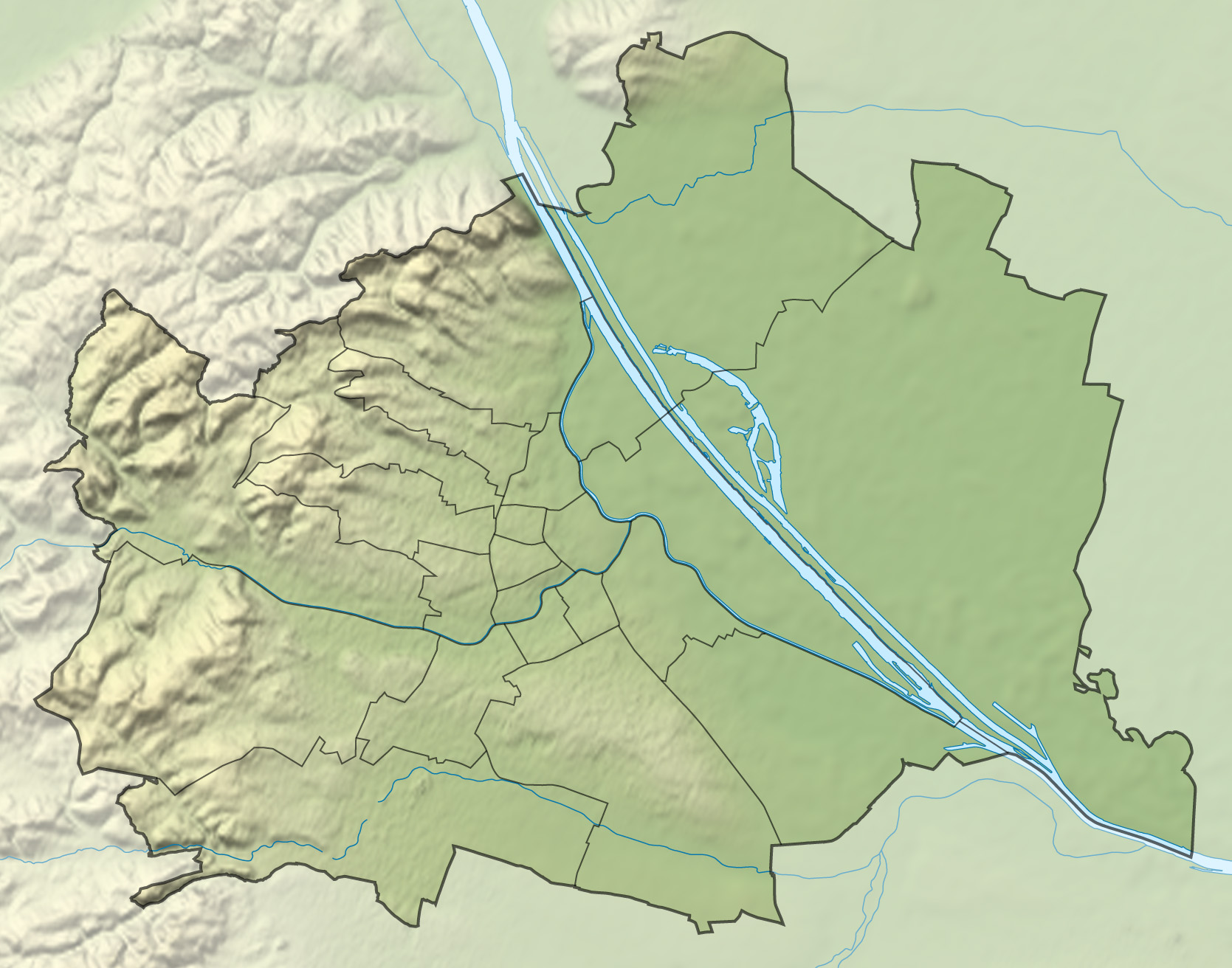
- Location of the mosque in Vienna

Religion
- Affiliation: Islam
- Ecclesiastical or organizational status: Mosque
- Leadership: Dr. Hashim Al-Mahrougi
- Status: Active

Location
- Location: Floridsdorf, Vienna
- Country: Austria
- Interactive map of Vienna Islamic Centre
- Coordinates: 48°14′42″N 16°23′51″E

Architecture
- Founder: Faisal bin Abdulaziz al Saud
- General contractor: Richard Lugner
- Groundbreaking: 1 July 1977
- Completed: 1979

Specifications
- Dome: 1
- Dome height (outer): 16 metres (52 ft)
- Dome dia. (outer): 20 m (66 ft)
- Minaret: 1
- Minaret height: 32 m (105 ft)
- Site area: 8,300 m^{2} (89,000 sq ft)

Website
- izwien.at/english/

The Vienna Islamic Centre (German: Islamisches Zentrum Wien) is the largest mosque in Austria, located in Vienna's 21st district Floridsdorf.

== Overview ==
In 1969, the Islamic community in Vienna purchased a 8,300-square-metre (89,000 ft^{2}) plot from the city of Vienna in order to build a mosque. Due to financial difficulties, the start of the construction was postponed several times. In 1975, Saudi king Faisal bin Abdulaziz al Saud pledged to finance the construction of the mosque.

After Richard Lugner was selected as the general contractor, construction work began on 1 July 1977. On 20 November 1979, the Vienna Islamic Centre was inaugurated by Rudolf Kirchschläger, President of Austria, as reported in Zeit im Bild.

The minaret of Vienna Islamic Centre is 32 metres (105 ft) high, while the dome is 16 metres (52 ft) high and 20 metres (66 ft) in diameter.

== Gallery ==
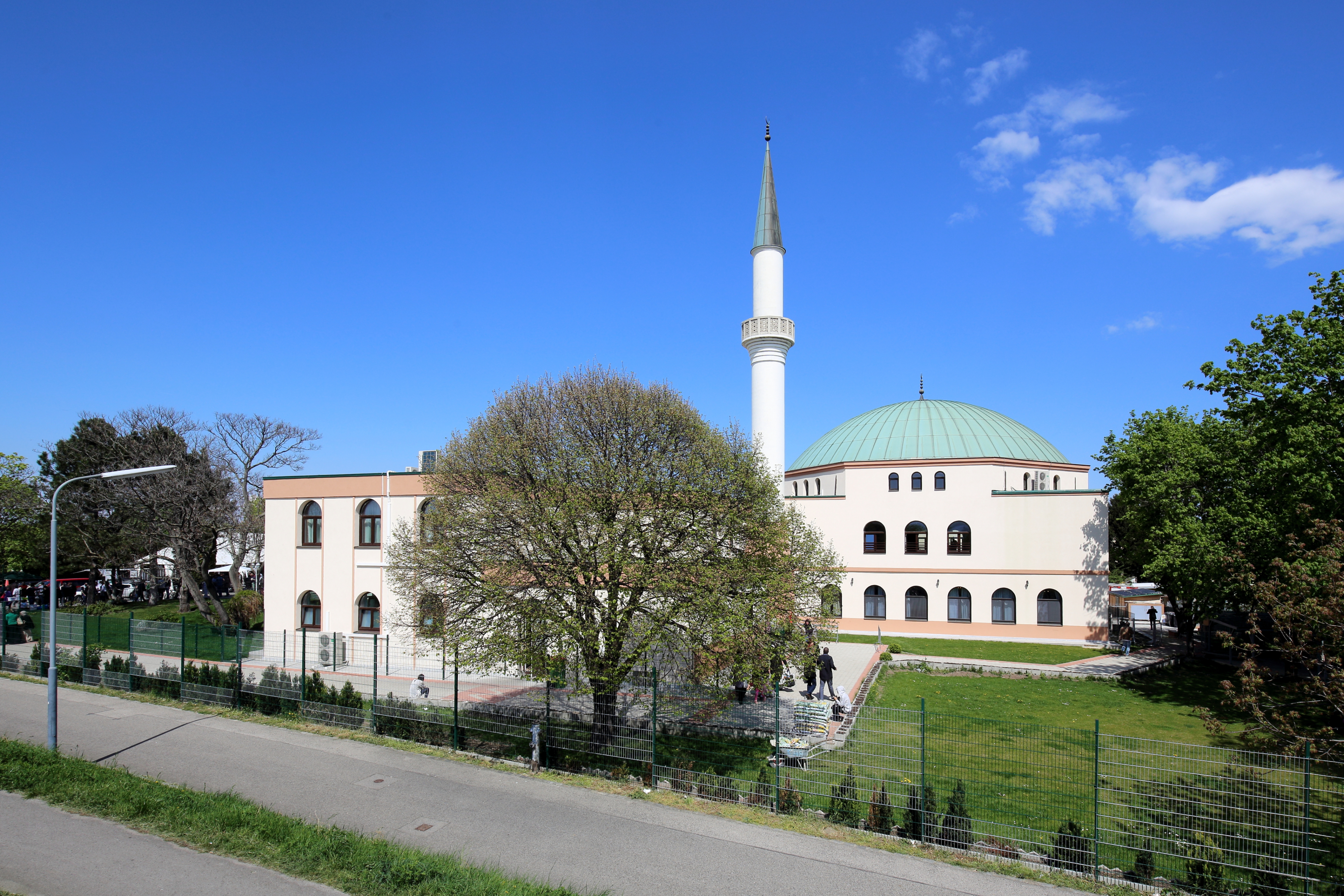

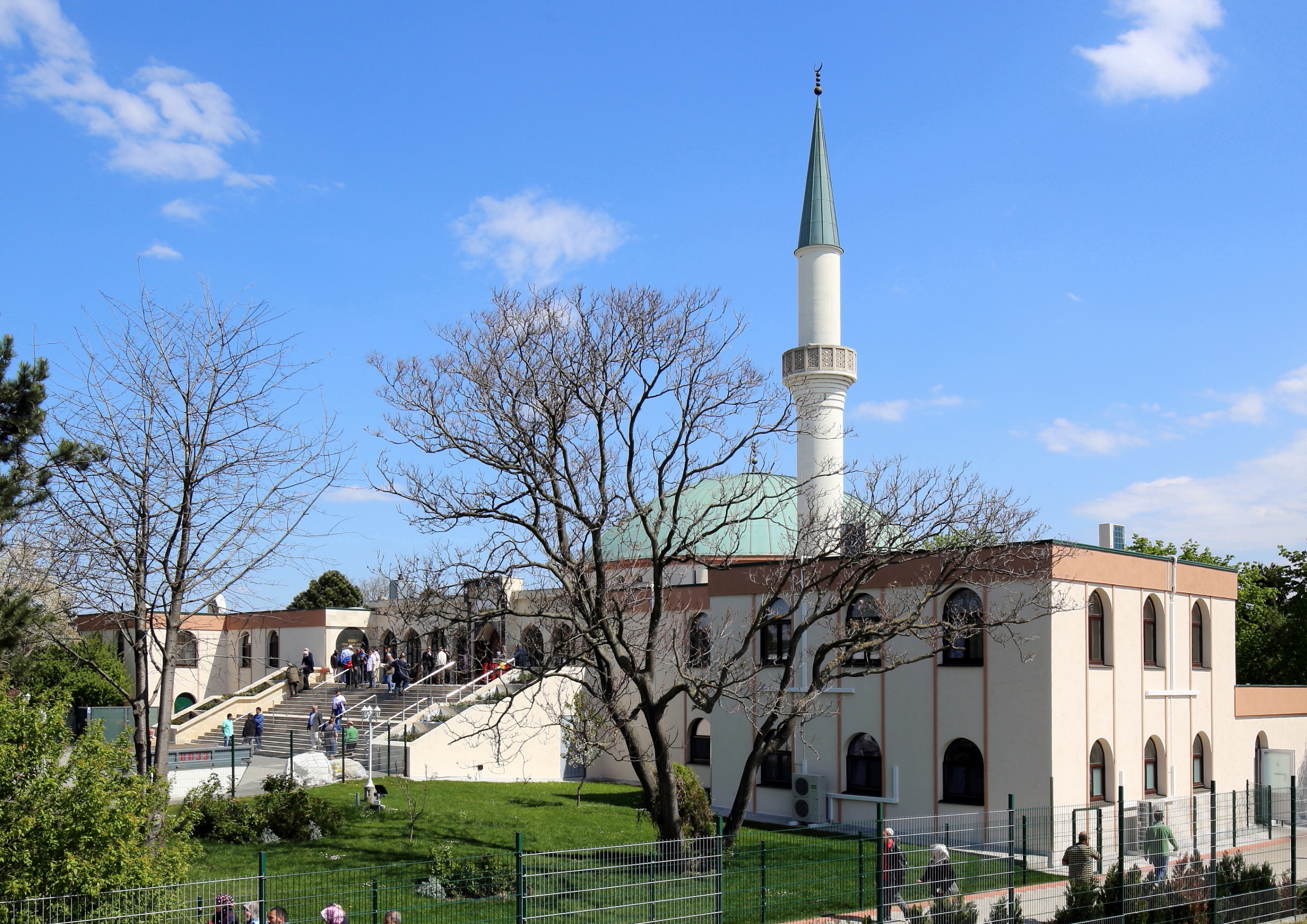

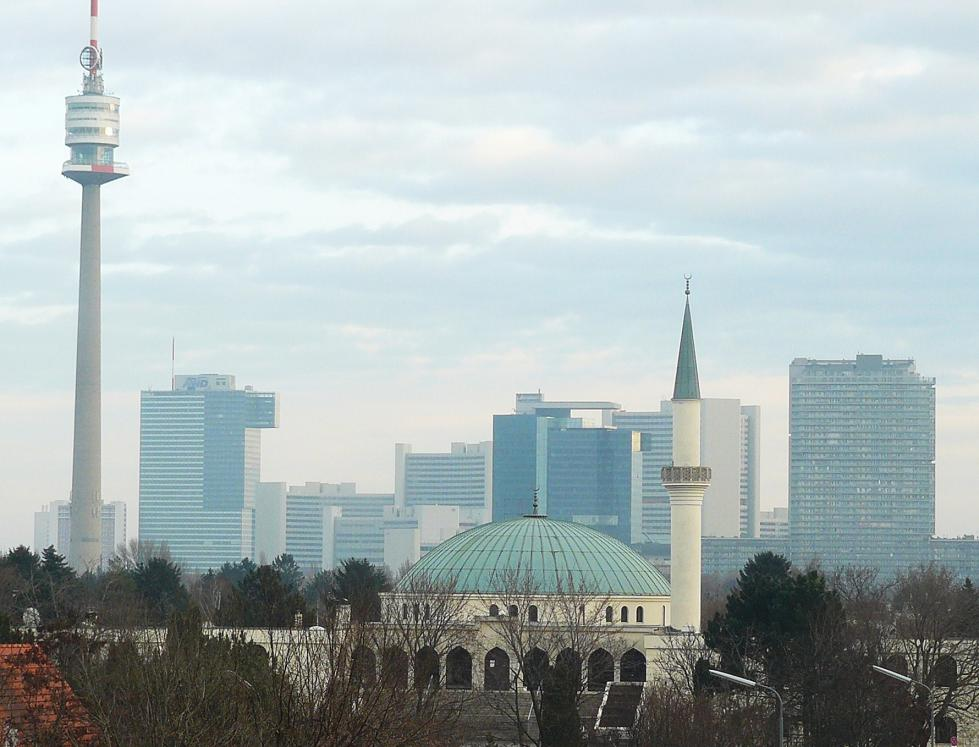

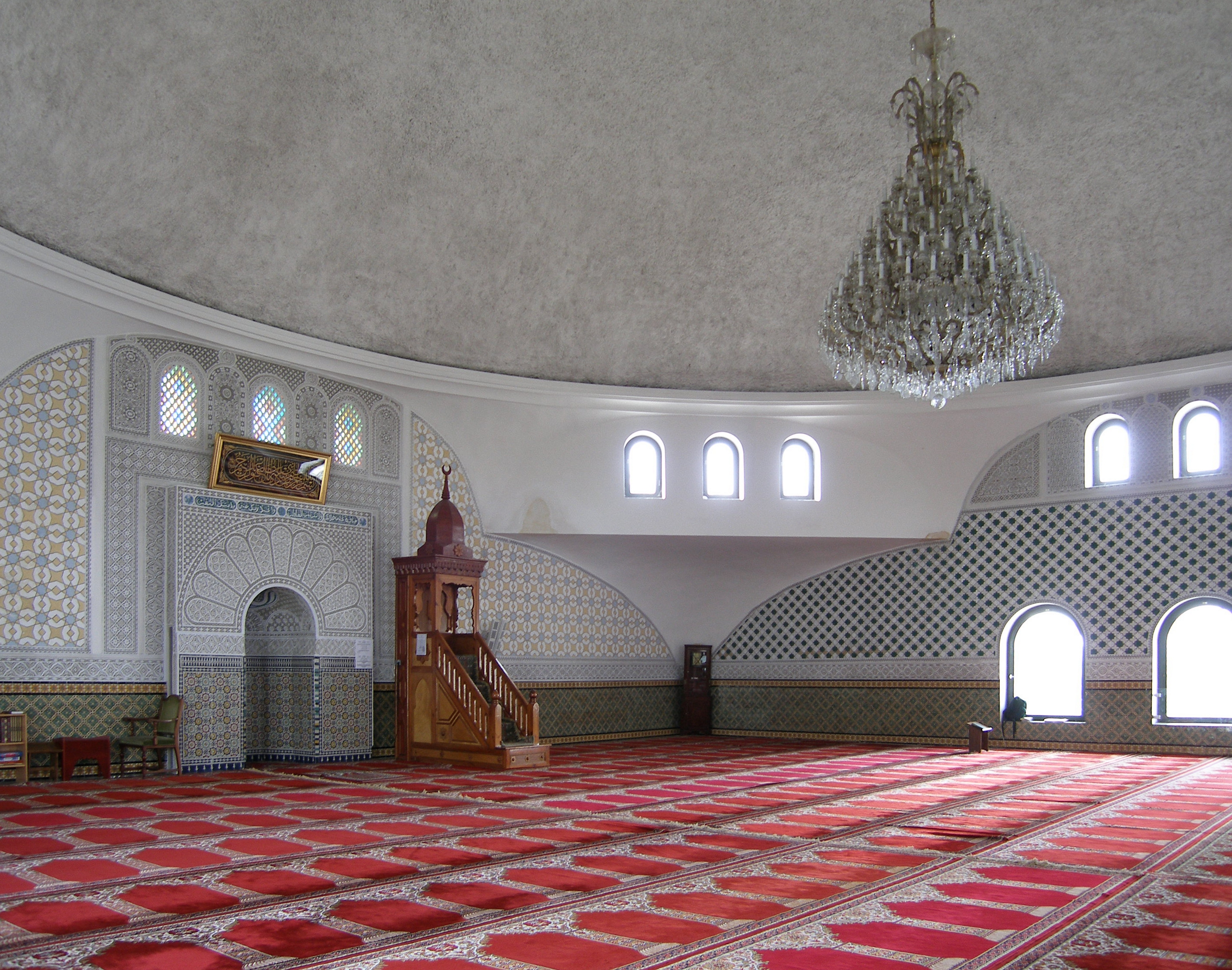

== See also ==
- Islam in Austria
- List of mosques in Austria
