= Gertraud Knoll =

Austrian pastor and politician (b. 1958)

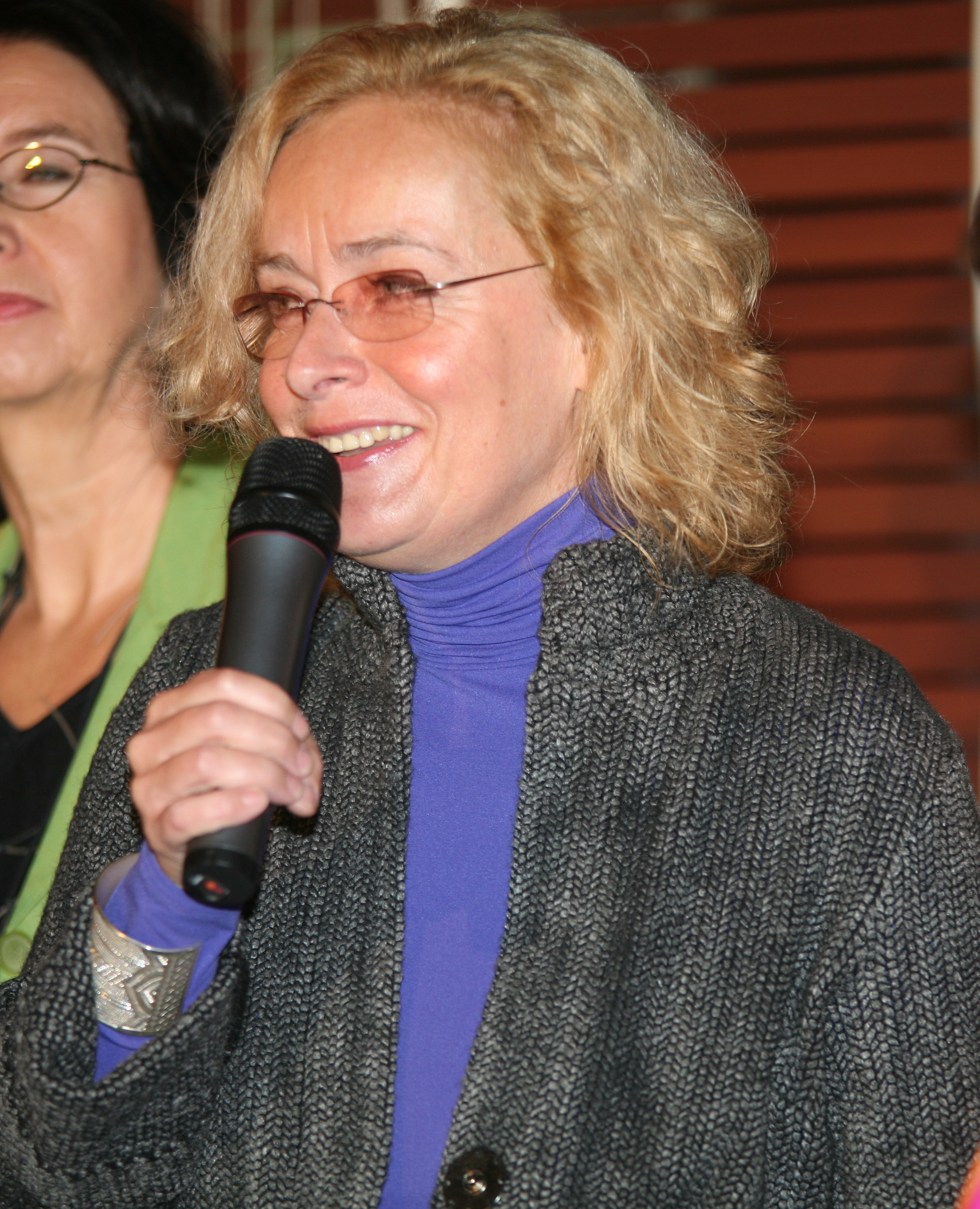
- Knoll in 2008

Member of the National Council (Austria)
- Preceded by: Caspar Einem

Member of the Federal Council (Austria)
- In office 2005–2007

Personal details
- Born: 7 December 1958 (age 67) Linz, Austria
- Party: Independent; Social Democratic Party of Austria (SPÖ)
- Children: 3
- Education: University of Vienna

Gertraud Knoll (née Braun, born 7 December 1958) is a former Lutheran Austrian pastor, superintendent and politician. She was a member of the Federal Council (Austria) and National Council (Austria).

== Biography ==
Knoll was born on 7 December 1958 in Linz, Austria.

From 1977 to 1982, Knoll studied theology in at the University of Vienna. After graduating, Knoll worked as an assistant for systematic theology at the university from 1982 to 1983.

Knoll became the first female Protestant pastor in Burgenland, serving in the parish of Weppersdorf. In 1992, she took six Afghan orphans who were in danger of being deported from Austria into her home. In 1994, she became the first woman to be appointed superintendent of the Protestant Church in Burgenland. Knoll was also elected to the Presidium of the German Protestant Church Assembly for a six-year term.

In the 1998 Austrian presidential election, Knoll took a leave of absence from her church position to run as a citizen and Independent candidate, supported by the Greens. She came second behind the incumbent Austrian People's Party (ÖVP) candidate Thomas Klestil, gaining 13.59% of the vote.

In 2002, Knoll resigned from her ecclesiastical offices, and ran for the Social Democratic Party of Austria (SPÖ) in the National Council elections. From 2005 to 2007, Knoll was a member of the Federal Council nominated by the SPÖ. Following Caspar Einem's retirement from politics, she took over his seat in the National Council (until 2008). Knoll also served as the head of the SPÖ's Future and Culture Workshop.

In 2008, Knoll left the Protestant Church in protest to a pastoral letter in which the Carinthian superintendent, Manfred Sauer, praised the late governor of Carinthia, Jörg Haider (BZÖ).

When Austria's Member of the European Parliament Maria Berger became Justice Minister for the SPÖ, Knoll was offered the EU mandate. She declined so that she could remain living in Austria, citing that her family was her priority.

Knoll was awarded the Marietta and Friedrich Torberg Medal in 2000.

== Personal life ==
Knoll was married to Otmar Knoll and they had three children.
