= Richard Lugner =

Austrian businessman and politician (1932–2024)

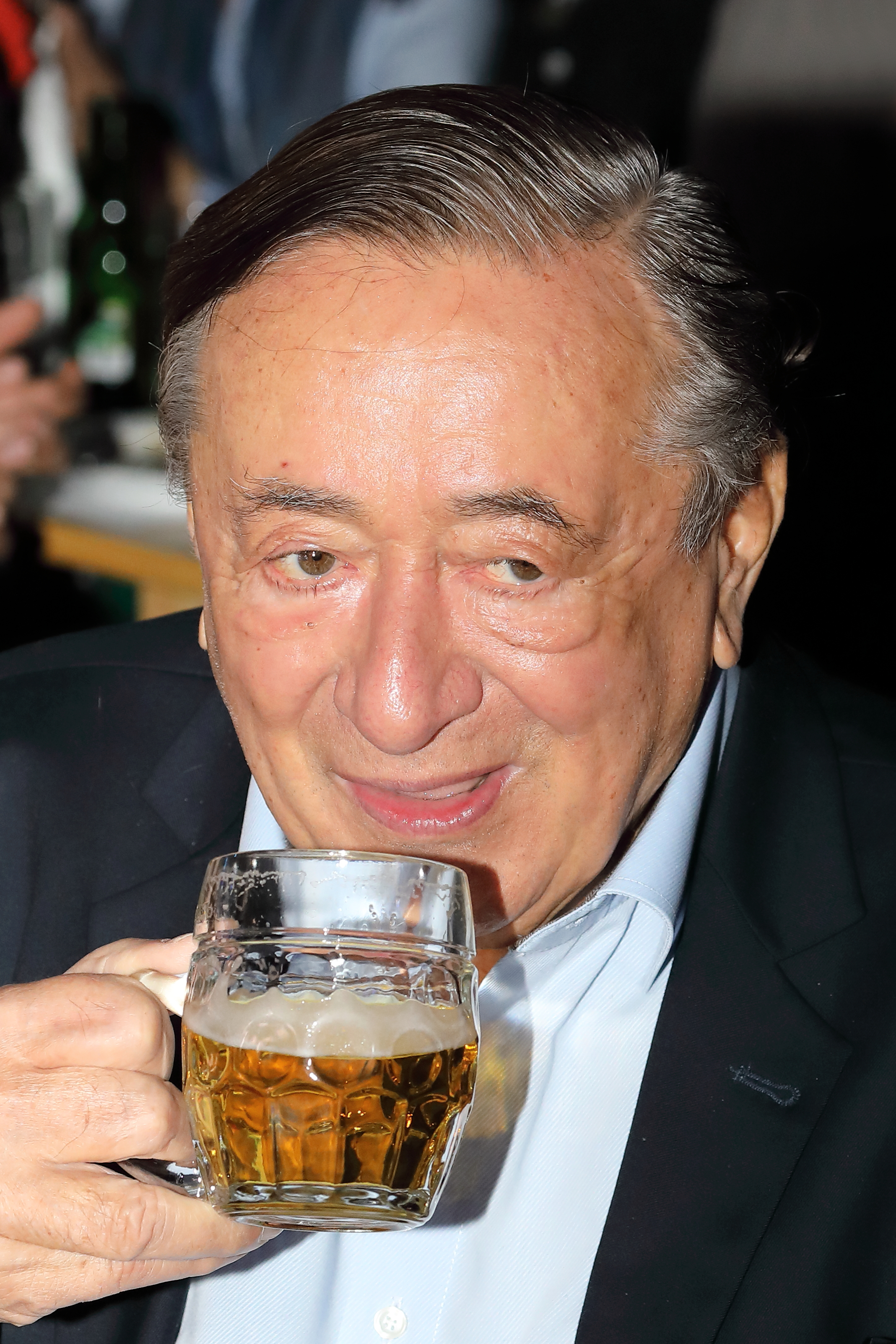
- Lugner in 2019
- Born: Richard Lugner; 11 October 1932; Vienna, Austria
- Died: 12 August 2024 (aged 91); Vienna, Austria
- Occupations: Businessman; politician
- Spouses: Christine Gmeiner (m. 1961; div. 1978); Cornelia Laufersweiler (m. 1979; div. 1983); Susanne Dietrich (m. 1984; div. 1989); Christina Lugner (m. 1990; div. 2007); Cathy Schmitz (m. 2014; div. 2016); Simone Reiländer (m. 2024)
- Children: 4

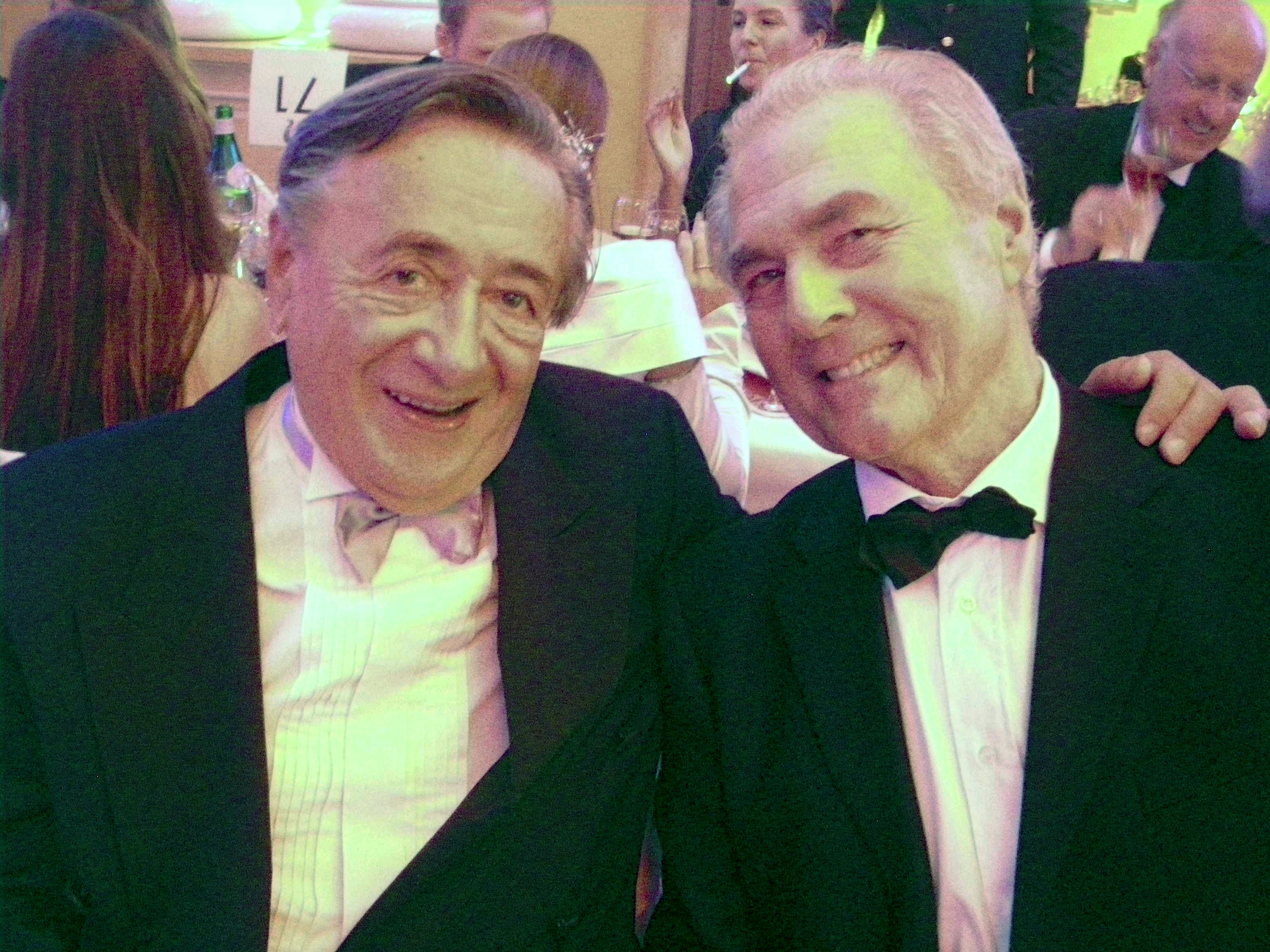
Lugner (left) with painter Johann Gassenhuber

Richard Siegfried "Mörtel" Lugner (11 October 1932 – 12 August 2024) was an Austrian businessman in the construction industry, a Viennese society figure, and an independent politician.

He was known for constructing Vienna’s first mosque and renovating the city’s main synagogue. He also opened Lugner City, a prominent shopping mall, and became famous for inviting celebrities to the Vienna Opera Ball.

== Early life and family ==
Richard Lugner was born in Vienna, the son of lawyer Richard Lugner Sr. and his wife Leopoldine. His father went missing in 1943 after becoming a prisoner of war in Russia during World War II.

After completing his general school education, Lugner graduated from the Federal Technical and Commercial College specializing in building construction in 1953.

== Business career ==
Lugner spent the first few years of his professional career working for a Viennese construction company and then moved to the construction department of the mineral oil company Mobil Oil Austria. Lugner got a licence to work as a building contractor (Baumeisterkonzession) in 1962 and at first specialized in the building of filling stations and the renovation of old buildings. His company started to prosper, and he eventually became known to a wider public with the 1979 completion of Vienna's first mosque, the Vienna Islamic Centre, situated on the banks of the river Danube. While the majority of his competition at this time was striving for the numerous large contracts of the reconstruction period and economic expansion, Lugner was able to assert himself with his company with relatively small contracts. He also became known for the 1988 renovation of the Stadttempel, Vienna's main synagogue. From 1997, Lugner gradually withdrew from the operative construction business and handed over the management of the construction company, which remained 100% owned by him, to his sons.

=== Lugner City ===
In 1990, Lugner opened his own shopping mall, Lugner City, the seventh largest shopping center in Austria at the time. Lugner City was opened in a working class district of Vienna, and from the start Lugner aggressively advertised his business by regularly inviting celebrities—starting with Thomas Gottschalk—who would perform there and sign autographs, a marketing strategy not very common in a city that back then had hardly any shopping malls. Through his shopping mall, Lugner was one of a small group of businesspeople who helped change Austrians' shopping habits by pushing to the limits the various regulations concerning opening hours. In a city where shops generally closed at 6 p.m. Mondays to Fridays and from noon on Saturdays until Monday morning, Lugner strongly advocated late night shopping on at least one weekday and an extension of shopping hours to Saturday afternoon, even when that meant raising the trades unions' opposition. Together with his lawyer Adrian Hollaender, Lugner tried several times to overturn the restrictions on store opening hours for Lugner City. He opposed the smoking ban in restaurants, even though he was a non-smoker himself. In 2003, Lugner City was transferred to Volksbanken-Immoconsult by means of a leaseback arrangement. Ten years later, the repurchase took place at the earliest possible contractual date by way of a share deal.

In September 2005, he opened the Lugner Kino, a multiplex cinema with 13 auditoriums offering space for 1840 visitors.

Since 2007, a jury at an annual casting in Lugner City chooses an "Opera Ball Princess".

== Vienna Opera Ball ==
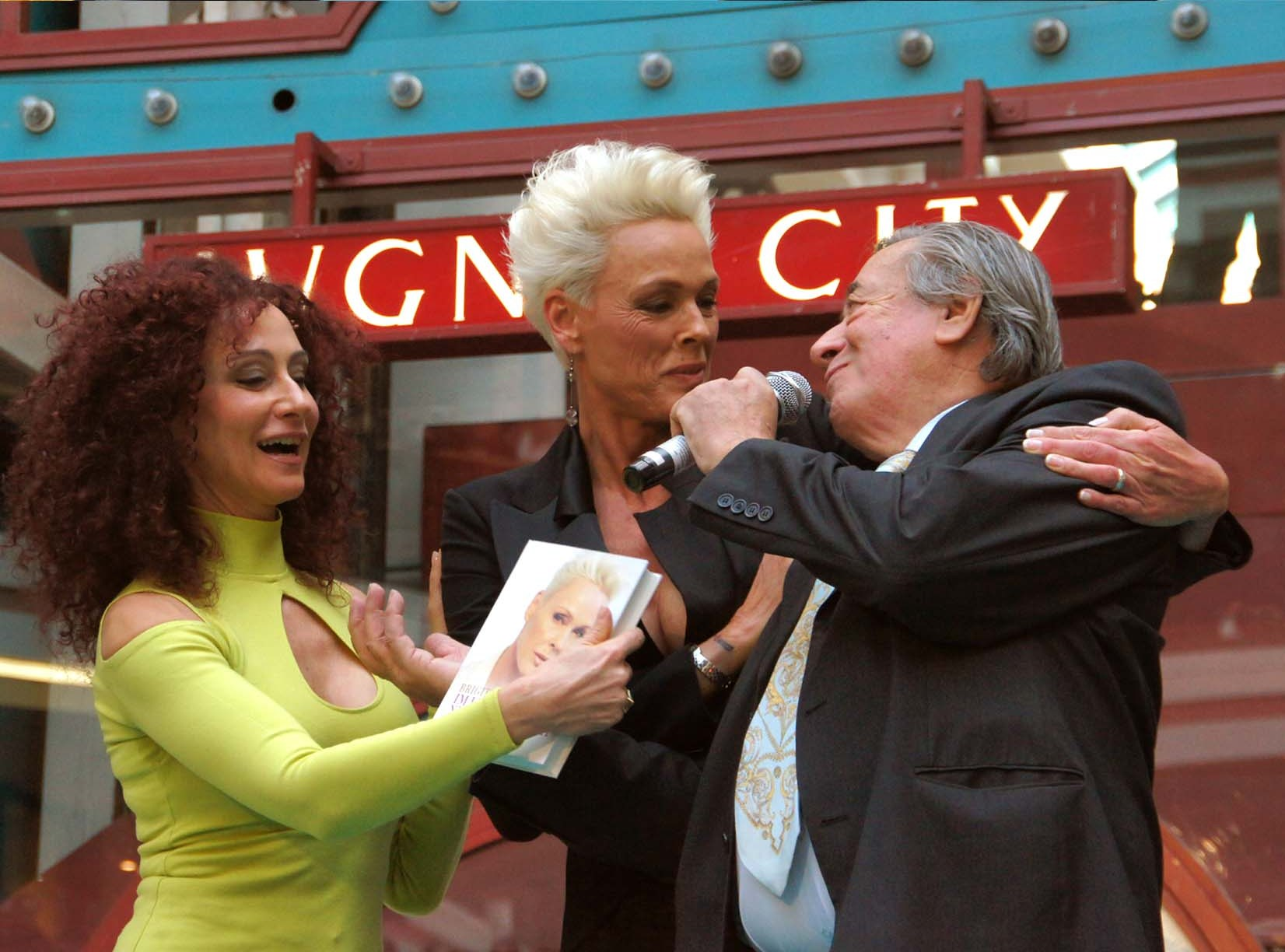
Lugner with Brigitte Nielsen (center) and his wife Christina, 2012 at his Lugner City mall

In 1992, Mörtel and Mausi Lugner (his then wife Christina), brought Harry Belafonte to Lugner City, and also took him along to the Vienna Opera Ball. Each year thereafter, the couple would pay a celebrity to visit the shopping centre and then accompany them as their guest to the ball. The only star Lugner was unable to have as his guest, despite several attempts, was Liz Taylor. In November 2023, Lugner stated he would be leaving the decisions on future guests to his daughter Jacqueline.

=== List of guests of the Vienna Opera Ball ===
Year	Guest(s)
1992	Harry Belafonte
1993	Joan Collins
1994	Ivana Trump
1995	Sophia Loren
1996	Grace Jones
1997	Sarah Ferguson
1998	Raquel Welch
1999	Faye Dunaway
2000	Jacqueline Bisset, Nadja Abd el Farrag
2001	Farrah Fawcett
2002	Claudia Cardinale
2003	Pamela Anderson
2004	Andie MacDowell
2005	Geri Halliwell
2006	Carmen Electra
2007	Paris Hilton
2008	Dita Von Teese
2009	Nicollette Sheridan
2010	Dieter Bohlen
2011	Karima "Ruby“ el-Mahroug´
2012	Brigitte Nielsen, Roger Moore
2013	Mira Sorvino, Gina Lollobrigida
2014	Kim Kardashian, Kris Jenner
2015	Elisabetta Canalis
2016	Brooke Shields
2017	Goldie Hawn
2018	Melanie Griffith
2019	Elle Macpherson
2020	Ornella Muti
2023	Jane Fonda
2024	Priscilla Presley

== Political ambitions ==
In the late 1990s, Lugner handed over his business to his two grown sons from an earlier marriage, Alexander and Andreas Lugner, and went into politics. In the 1998 presidential elections, he finished fourth in a field of five candidates, receiving 9.91% of the popular vote; incumbent Federal president Thomas Klestil, who had been running for a second term of office, received 63.4%. For the parliamentary elections that took place the following year, the Lugners organised a separate platform called Die Unabhängigen ("The Independents") but, as they only received 1.02% of the vote, did not get any seats in the Nationalrat. Nevertheless, at the end of the millennium, a survey found that more than 90% of Austrians recognized the name Lugner. For the 2016 presidential election he announced his intention to collect the necessary signatures in order to participate. He received 6,000 supporting votes in time to be admitted to the election and received 2.26% in the first round.

== Media appearances ==
Die Lugners ("The Lugners") was a reality TV show that first aired in 2003, produced by private television broadcaster ATV which showed Richard and Christina Lugner, their daughter Jacqueline, and Richard Lugner's mother-in-law Martha Haidinger at home, at work, and on holiday. It was modeled on the US series The Osbournes.

Lugner appeared weekly in the show Wir sind Kaiser, which has been broadcast since 2007. In 2010, he played the role of Mr. Buttler at the Karl May Festival in Gföhl. In 2016, he appeared with his then-wife Cathy in the RTL II documentary soap "Lugner und Cathy – Der Millionär und das Bunny."

== Controversies ==
In a public controversy in early February 2007, opponents of abortion criticized Lugner for renting out a space in Lugner City to the VenusMed sexual medicine center. This led to a public conflict with Auxiliary bishop Andreas Laun.

In 2002, Lugner made a property available to the Church of Scientology for one week for public relations work. In 2011, he wished the organization "all the best for the future" in an email to the president of the Austrian L. Ron Hubbard Foundation, which was criticized as sympathetic to Scientology.

In March 2022, a few days into the Russian invasion of Ukraine, Lugner told the Puls 4 channel in an interview about FPÖ party leader Herbert Kickl, "they should send him to Ukraine sometime so they can shoot him."

== Personal life ==
Lugner had four children: His two sons, Alexander and Andreas Lugner, are from his first marriage from 1961 until 1978 with Christine Gmeiner. He had another child, Nadin, with actress Sonja Jeannine. His youngest child, daughter Jacqueline (born 1993), is from his fourth marriage with Christina Lugner. The couple divorced in 2007.

In September 2014, Lugner married German Playboy model Cathy Schmitz at a ceremony held at the Schönbrunn Palace in Vienna. Schmitz was a Playboy Bunny at the Playboy Club in Cologne before being the cover model of German Playboy in 2013. This was Lugner's fifth marriage. They divorced in 2016. After their marriage, Schmitz confirmed that she received monthly financial benefits from Lugner in the form of income. In July 2021, his relationship with Simone Reiländer was announced, to whom he became engaged in October. The engagement was broken off in December 2021, followed by reconciliation and marriage in June 2024. When choosing a partner, Lugner often sought advice from astrologer Gerda Rogers.

In October 2019, Lugner unveiled his wax statue at the Madame Tussauds wax museum in Vienna.

In 2016, he was diagnosed with prostate cancer, which he declared defeated after several months of radiotherapy in spring 2017. After an injury during a vacation in the Maldives in 2020, he was diagnosed with skin cancer. He subsequently underwent surgery and was found to be cancer-free. The disease returned in 2021, which resulted in another operation. In July 2024, he had to undergo an emergency operation because of a leaky heart valve.

He was given the nickname "Mörtel" by Austrian tabloid journalist Michael Jeannée.

Richard Lugner died in Vienna on 12 August 2024, at the age of 91.

== Awards ==
- 1987: Awarded the professional title of "Technischer Rat" by the Federal Ministry for Buildings and Technology
- 1992: Awarded the Silver Medal of Honor for Services to the State of Vienna on the occasion of the 30th anniversary of his company
- 2024: Honorary member of the Villach Carnival Guild
