= Die Lugners =

- Country of origin: Austria

Die Lugners is an Austrian television series about Richard Lugner and his family.

== See also ==
- List of Austrian television series
