= Theo Öhlinger =

Austrian constitutional scholar (1939–2023)

Theodor Öhlinger (22 June 1939 – 10 December 2023) was an Austrian constitutional scholar and educator. Öhlinger was a member the Austrian Constitutional Court from 1977 to 1989 and a professor of constitutional and administrative law at the University of Vienna from 1974 to 2007. From 1999 until his death, he served as the deputy chairman of the board of trustees of the Vienna Museum of Art History. Öhlinger published 23 books and more than 350 scholarly articles and appeared as a frequent commentator on legal issues in the Austrian news media. Austrian President Alexander van der Bellen called him Austria's "operating system" during the turbulent times of May 2019.

== Early life ==
Theo Öhlinger was born on 22 June 1939 in Ried im Innkreis.

From 1950 to 1958, Öhlinger received his secondary education at a gymnasium with special emphasis on the classical humanities. In his adolescence, Öhlinger wanted to become an art historian; he spent much of his spare time collecting and cataloging reproductions of classical paintings.

== Career ==
In 1958, Öhlinger enrolled at the University of Innsbruck to study art history and philosophy. He grew bored with art history quickly, a fact he would later blame on oversaturation stemming from his intense engagement with the subject in his teenage years. He began work on a doctoral dissertation in philosophy but eventually abandoned it out of disillusionment with the job prospects in the field. Thus giving up on philosophy too, Öhlinger switched to studying law in late 1962. He breezed through law school in a mere three years, receiving his doctorate of law in early 1966.

Shortly before formally graduating, in late 1965, Öhlinger had secured employment as an assistant professor with the University of Innsbruck. From 1967 to 1972, he also worked for the Constitutional Service in the Chancellery, an office that assists ministries in drafting legislation and in evaluating the constitutionality of draft statutes written elsewhere.

In 1973, Öhlinger submitted his habilitation thesis to the University of Innsbruck. His alma mater promptly upgraded Öhlinger's position from assistant professor to associate professor, effective 1974. At the same time, the University appointed him Head of Department of European Law. Also in 1974, Öhlinger accepted a full professorship at the University of Vienna.

In 1977, Öhlinger was appointed substitute member of the Austrian Constitutional Court. He retired from the Court in 1989 to become executive director of the Austrian Academy of Public Administration, a professional development center that provides postgraduate instruction and extra-occupational training for Austrian career civil servants. Öhlinger left the Academy in 1995 when the University of Vienna offered him the position of Head of Department of Constitutional and Administrative Law.

In addition to his commitments in Innsbruck and Vienna, Öhlinger also held visiting teaching positions at the Paris Nanterre University, the Aix-Marseille University, the University of Fribourg, and the Pennsylvania State University Dickinson School of Law.From 1984 to 1990, he also was a member of the Committee of Independent Experts of the European Social Charter. From 1992 to 2004, he was a member of the board of directors of the International Association of Constitutional Law.

In early 2003, the cabinet of then-Chancellor Wolfgang Schüssel launched the Austria Convention (German: Österreich-Konvent), a conference of legal scholars and public intellectuals tasked with drafting a new constitution for Austria. The existing constitution, exceptionally bulky and difficult to navigate, had been posing serious technical challenges to legislators and constitutional justices for decades. The Convention was charged with exploring reform. Öhlinger was a member of the Convention from its launch to its conclusion in 2005.

Since his days on the Convention, Öhlinger served a number of additional Austrian cabinets in a variety of advisory positions; he performed advisory work for legislatures as well. When Barbara Prammer became the President of the National Council, for example, she retained Öhlinger as her consultant on constitutional affairs.

In 1999, Öhlinger was appointed deputy chairman of the board of trustees of the Kunsthistorisches Museum, the Vienna Museum of Art History.

In 2007, Öhlinger emerited from the University of Vienna.

Öhlinger wrote 23 books and more than 350 scholarly articles.

Öhlinger died in Vienna on 10 December 2023, at the age of 84.

== Media ==
Öhlinger was frequently quoted and occasionally interviewed by Austrian national and regional news media ranging from broadsheets to tabloids and from the national public broadcaster to entertainment and lifestyle magazines. Öhlinger provided analysis and commentary on the extraordinary complexity of Austria's body of constitutional law, the country's interminable efforts at constitutional reform, the role of the administrative court system in asylum matters, other aspects of asylum law, the appointment of Wolfgang Brandstetter to the Austrian Constitutional Court, the workings and composition of the Constitutional Court in general, the Constitutional Court's annulment of the 2016 Austrian presidential election, Austria's system of public funding of political parties, child benefit legislation, freedom of religion, smoking bans, and assisted suicide, among many other subjects.

== Selected awards ==
- 1973: Cardinal Innitzer Award for contributions to legal science
- 2004: Festschrift
- 2011: Cross of Honour for Science and Art, First Class
- 2011: Officer of the Ordre des Palmes Académiques
- 2012: Knight of the French Legion of Honour

== Publications ==
=== Standard textbooks ===
- Öhlinger, Theo, ed. (2009) [2001]. Verfahren vor den Gerichtshöfen des öffentlichen Rechts. Vienna: Manz. ISBN 978-3-214-01081-2.
- — (2016) [1993]. Verfassungsrecht (11th revised ed.). Vienna: Facultas. ISBN 978-3-708-91434-3.
- —; Potacs, Michael (2017) [1998]. EU-Recht und staatliches Recht: die Anwendung des Europarechts im innerstaatlichen Bereich (6th revised ed.). Vienna: LexisNexis. ISBN 978-3-700-76606-3.

=== Selected other books ===
- Öhlinger, Theo (1973). Der völkerrechtliche Vertrag im staatlichen Recht: eine theoretische, dogmatische und vergleichende Untersuchung am Beispiel Österreichs. Vienna: Springer. ISBN 0-387-81105-2.
- — (1974). Das Problem des verwaltungsrechtlichen Vertrages: ein Baustein eines Allgemeinen Verwaltungsrechts des leistenden und planenden Staates. Salzburg: Pustet. ISBN 3-702-50130-4.
- — (1975). Der Stufenbau der Rechtsordnung: rechtstheoretische und ideologische Aspekte. Vienna: Manz. ISBN 3-214-06681-1.
- Baumann, Ruth; Öhlinger, Theo (1976). Norm und Realität im Umweltschutz. Vienna: Jugend und Volk. ISBN 3-714-17814-7.
- Öhlinger, Theo; Mayrzedt, Hans; Kucera, Gustav (1976). Institutionelle Aspekte der österreichischen Integrationspolitik. Vienna: Verlag der österreichischen Akadamie der Wissenschaften. ISBN 3-700-10158-9.
- — (1976). Der Bundesstaat zwischen Reiner Rechtslehre und Verfassungsrealität. Vienna: Braumüller. ISBN 3-700-30129-4.
- Floretta, Hans; Öhlinger, Theo (1978). Die Menschenrechtspakte der Vereinten Nationen: ein Beitrag zum Stand der Grundrechte in Österreich, insbesondere zu den sozialen Grundrechten. Vienna: Manz. ISBN 3-214-06713-3.
- Öhlinger, Theo (1978). Verträge im Bundesstaat. Vienna: Braumüller. ISBN 3-700-30183-9.
- —, ed. (1982). Methodik der Gesetzgebung: legistische Richtlinien in Theorie und Praxis. Vienna: Springer. ISBN 978-3-704-65957-6.
- — (1982). Verfassungsrechtliche Probleme der Mitbestimmung der Arbeitnehmer im Unternehmen. Vienna: Verlag des Österreichischen Gewerkschaftsbundes. ISBN 3-703-50247-9.
- — (1982). Die Anwendung des Völkerrechts auf Verträge im Bundesstaat. Vienna: Braumüller. ISBN 3-700-30320-3.
- — (1988). Verfassungsrechtliche Aspekte eines Beitritts Österreichs zu den EG. Vienna: Signum-Verlag. ISBN 3-854-36077-0.
- — (1999). Verfassungsfragen einer Mitgliedschaft zur Europäischen Union: ausgewählte Abhandlungen. Vienna: Springer. ISBN 978-3-704-66029-9.
