= Sigmund Freud Private University =

Private university in Vienna, Austria

Coordinates: 48°11′39″N 16°24′43″E

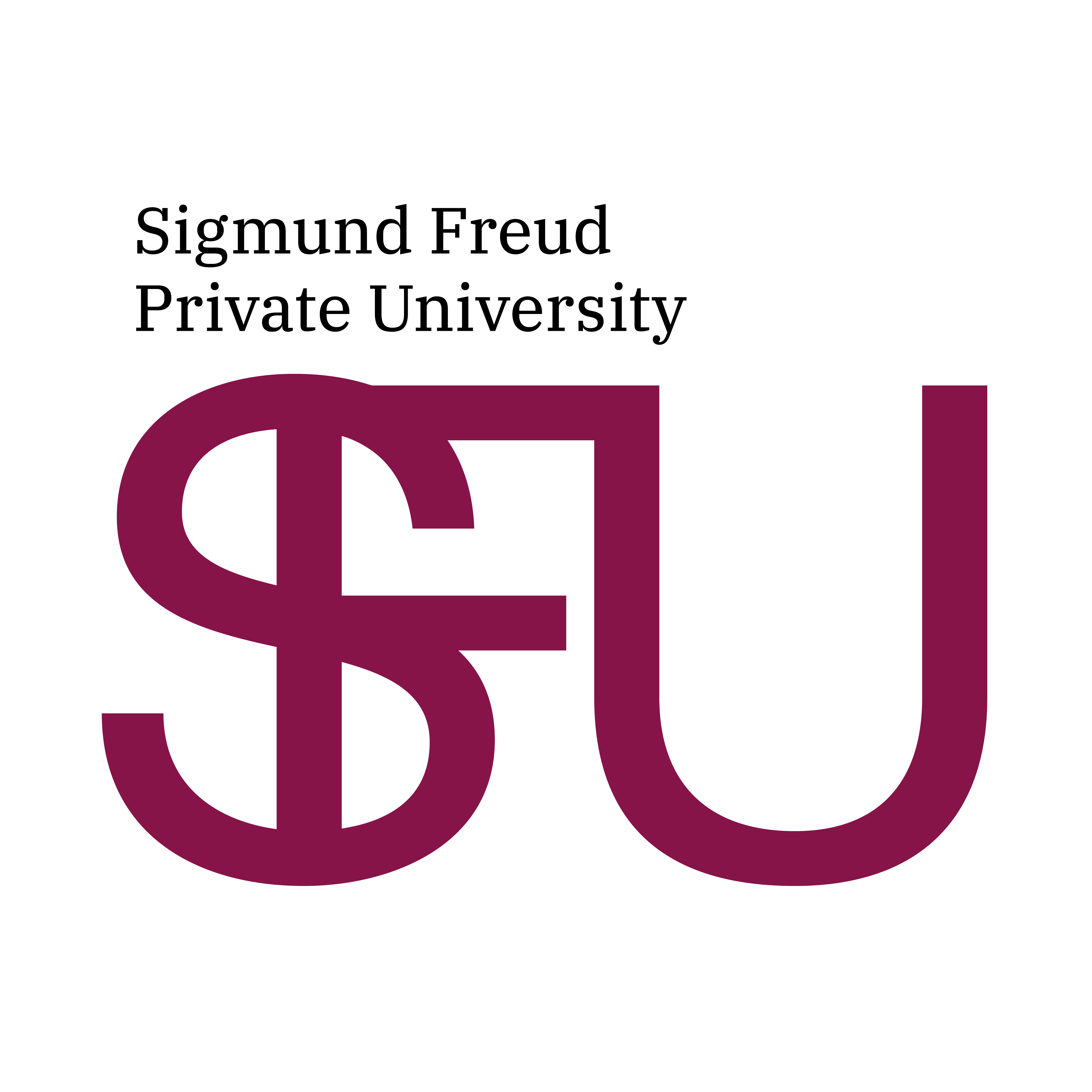
- Type: Private
- Established: 2005
- Rector: Johannes Pollak
- Total staff: 1925 (341 VZÄ) (2021/22)
- Students: 6164 (2024/2025), incl. including foreign locations)
- Location: Vienna, Paris, Milan, Berlin, Ljubljana, Linz
- Website: www.sfu.ac.at/en/

Sigmund Freud Private University (SFU) is a private and for-profit university accredited by the Agency for Quality Assurance and Accreditation Austria. It uses different names for itself, often Sigmund Freud Private University, in some instances, however, it calls itself Sigmund Freud Private University Vienna or Sigmund Freud University. It is located in Vienna, Austria and was first accredited in 2005. As a university in the field of Human Sciences, SFU specializes in Psychotherapy Science, Psychology, Medicine (since 2015), and Law (since 2016).

The sponsoring organization is Sigmund Freud PrivatUniversität GmbH, whose sole shareholder is SFU Forschungs- und Verwaltungs GmbH.

In August 2024, it was announced that Johannes Pollak, the former president of Webster Vienna Private University, would succeed Alfred Pritz as president of Sigmund Freud Private University. The transition took place in August 2025.

In 2026, Oakley Capital, a British company specializing in investments in the higher education, education, and technology sectors, acquired SFU.

The investment firm is taking over the operating company of SFU. An Austrian holding company (OCG Skilled Education Holding GmbH / “Skilled Education”) was established for the acquisition of SFU. The project was carried out in collaboration with a group of international education and higher education experts led by Kevin Lynch, who will serve as managing director of the Austrian operating and holding company. Plans include further expansion of the academic offerings at the Vienna campus, collaborations with other universities, and investments in digitalization, research, and innovative teaching formats. According to SFU, the university’s academic autonomy will remain fully intact.

== Psychotherapy Science as an academic discipline ==
Sigmund Freud Private University pioneered the study of Psychotherapy Science as an academic degree. This program approaches Psychotherapy by emphasizing research activities, practical training, and academic exchange among different psychotherapy schools. Sigmund Freud Private University is one of the only academic institutions in the world where Psychotherapy is taught at an undergraduate level.

The Faculty of Psychotherapy Sciences at Sigmund Freud Private University offers the Bachelor's, Master's, and Doctoral Programs in Psychotherapy Science, as well as psychotherapy training in a variety of methods, including Behaviour Therapy, Psychoanalysis, Individual Psychology, Gestalt, Psychodrama and Systemic Family Therapy.

The Faculty of Psychotherapy Science is headed by Dean Andrea Jesser. Martin Kuška serves as Vice Dean for Research, and Sascha Giebelhausen as Vice Dean for International Affairs.

All degree programmes in Psychotherapy Science are offered in German and in English.

Sigmund Freud Private University hosts the annual International Summer School in Psychotherapy—an intensive, two-week program in the fundamentals of psychotherapy theory and practice for students and professionals from around the world.

== Psychology ==
The Faculty of Psychology offers a bachelor’s and master’s degree program as well as a PhD program in psychology. In the 2019/20 winter semester, the bachelor’s and master’s degree programs in psychology taught in English were also launched. As a postgraduate university course, the SFU offers training modules in the field of online counseling.

The Faculty of Psychology operates outpatient clinics in Vienna and Milan. Furthermore, the Faculty of Psychology is a research partner of the commercial service provider Instahelp, which offers online psychological counseling.

The Faculty of Psychology is headed by Dean Gerhard Benetka. The Dean’s Office also includes Eva Dreher as Vice Dean for Teaching, Natalie Rodax as Vice Dean, Nora Ruck as Vice Dean for Research, and Dominik Mihalits as Vice Dean for International Affairs.[29]

== Medicine ==
The Faculty of Medicine offers degree programmes in medicine and dentistry at Bachelor’s and Master’s level; graduates are awarded the degree of Doctor of Medicine (Dr. med. univ.) or Doctor of Dental Surgery (Dr. med. dent.).

The AUVA Trauma Centre Vienna Meidling (1120 Vienna) and the Lorenz Böhler Accident Hospital (1200 Vienna) are among the SFU’s teaching hospitals.

Since 2024, the Faculty of Medicine has been working in close collaboration with the Vienna Health Network, which supports the university in practical training and research. From the 2024/25 winter semester onwards, 10 places will be reserved each year for students who commit to practising medicine for the Vienna Health Network for several years after completing their studies.

The Faculty of Medicine is headed by Katarzyna Krzyzanowska-Mittermayer as Dean. Markus Hof is Programme Director of the Master’s programme in Dentistry. Otto Burghuber heads the Centre for Internal Medicine and is Chair of the Faculty’s Research Council. The Administration for Resources, Organisation and Development is headed by Barbara Hohenauer-Hlebaina. Bernhard Jäger is responsible for the programme management of the Master’s programme in Human Medicine.

== Law ==
A law degree in Vienna based on the Bologna model, comprising a Bachelor’s degree (LL.B., 6 semesters) and a Master’s degree (LL.M., 4 semesters), is offered as a full-time on-campus programme.

In addition, a Master’s Programme in Public International Law is delivered in cooperation with the United Nations Institute for Training and Research (UNITAR).

The Faculty of Law is headed by Elke Heinrich-Pendl as Dean. Karin Bruckmüller is Vice-Dean for Teaching, and Konrad Lachmayer is Vice-Dean for Research.

== Outpatient clinics ==
SFU's university clinics combine high-quality patient care with education and research. The Psychotherapeutic Outpatient Clinic provides psychotherapy and counselling for adults, children, and adolescents. The Psychological Outpatient Clinic offers psychological assessment, diagnostics, treatment, counselling, and preventive services, including specialized care for children. The SFU Dental Clinic delivers comprehensive dental care while serving as the practical training facility for dentistry students under expert supervision.

== Publications ==
- Slunecko, T., Przyborski, A. & Benetka, G. (2006). Psychology curriculae and the challenge of Bologna: An answer from a cultural science perspective.
- Wanted in Europe: The Sigmund Freud Private University (SFU) of Psychotherapy in Vienna is to launch a full programme of degree and non-degree courses taught and supported entirely in English. Accredited as a private university by the Austrian Accreditation Council in 2005, the SFU at 9 Schnirchgasse is the first university worldwide to offer comprehensive programmes in the science of psychotherapy.
