= Win with the Lion =

"Win with the Lion" (Ukrainian: Перемагай з Левом) is an annual tourism conference held in Lviv, Ukraine, each autumn. The conference is mainly organized by the non-governmental organizations Etnovyr and Dik-Art.

== 2009 conference ==
The first "Win with the Lion" conference took place on 29 October 2009, in Lviv, Ukraine. The main aim of the program was to present the historical and tourist potential of the city and prepare it for the arrival of the 2012 UEFA European Football Championship. There were presentations by domestic and foreign tourism experts, round table discussions about branding and tourist products, workshops, and discussions about whether Lviv should join the international association European Cities Marketing. The conference was organized by the Lviv City Council in association with representatives of the city's tourism industry.

Foreign experts that were invited to the 2009 conference include: Dieter Hardt-Stremayr, President of European Cities Marketing; John Heeley, Professor at the University of Nottingham, and founder of Best Destination Marketing; Adam Mikolajczyk, executive director of Brief for Poland; Ossian Stiernstrand, of Göteborg & Co; Wolfgang J.Kraus, Vienna Tourist Board; and Brigitte Weiss, Vienna Tourist Board.

== 2010 conference ==
The second conference was held on 15–17 November 2010, and its topic was: "Tourism: Cooperation as a key to success and victory".

The main emphasis of this conference was placed on marketing and branding - the process of city brand formation. Leading experts presented their vision of tourism development in Lviv, and shared their own experiences of European cities. Another subject discussed was the working out of new ideas for further cooperation between business and government to optimize the development of the tourism sphere in Ukraine. Experts acknowledged that Lviv is heading in the right direction on the issue of branding and has a great tourism potential. This year's conference was marked by the fact that European Cities Marketing presented a certificate of membership to the city of Lviv, making it the only city in Ukraine to join the organization.

Overall, the conference was attended by over 200 people from all over Ukraine - Lviv, Kyiv, Uzhhorod, Zhytomyr, Chernihiv, and other cities.

== 2011 conference ==
The third "Win with the Lion" conference was held on 24–25 November 2011. Its topic was: "The world travel trends: Surf's Up!". This year's speakers included experts from Vienna, Graz, Berlin, London, Kraków, Moscow, and Istanbul.

Various presentations during the conference explored how Vienna, Graz, and Berlin managed to become successful tourist cities, and how to create an interesting competitive tourism product. Special attention was devoted to cooperation between business and government in urban tourism, and how tourist information centres should be working. Among the speakers were: John Heeley, Interim Chief Executive Officer of European Cities Marketing; Susanne Höller, Graz Tourismus & Stadtmarketing Gmbh Austria; Gabriela Schweinberger, Berlin Tourism Marketing GmbH Germany; Katrin Heintschel, Vienna Tourist Board; Christian Gessl, Federal Economic Chamber of Austria; Hans-Ulrich Trosien, from Germany; Jerzy Gajewski, Municipality of Kraków; Olga Tikhonova, founder of Delicious Istanbul; Andreas Zins, Department of Tourism and Hospitality Management, Modul University Vienna; Nick Greenfield, European Tour Operators Association; Ruslan Ashymkanov, Trout & Partners.

== 2012 conference ==
The third conference was held on 21–22 November 2012, and its topic was: "The meetings and events industry – Ukraine, are you ready to benefit?". Meetings industry leaders made presentations on new trends and challenges that should be considered by new destinations. The Tourist Information Workshop, which proved popular in 2011, continued this year in cooperation with GIZ organizers, inviting newly established tourist information centres from all over Ukraine to gain knowledge and share best practices from European experts, including: Paola Casubolo, CEO of Lovingenova; Gabriela Schweinberger, international business coach and consultant; Freya Sackx, Ghent Tourist Information Centre; Lev Kuznetso, Deputy Director of St. Petersburg Marketing Agency; and Olena Holysheva, Head of Lviv Tourist Information Centre.

Other speakers at the 2012 conference included: Ignacio de Delàs, Turisme de Barcelona; Roger Pride, Cardiff and Co; Beata Palis, Krakow Convention Bureau; Paul Kennedy, Director of Kennedy Integrated Solutions; Elisabeth Hansa, owner of International Consultancy and Business Development; and Tom Hulton, International Relations IMEX Group. Delegates also heard a seminar on the topic of "How Ukraine can stay on the map in 2013", delivered by the European Tour Operators Association and moderated by Nick Greenfield, the Head of Tour Operator Relations.
