= Rumor =

Unverified message or story

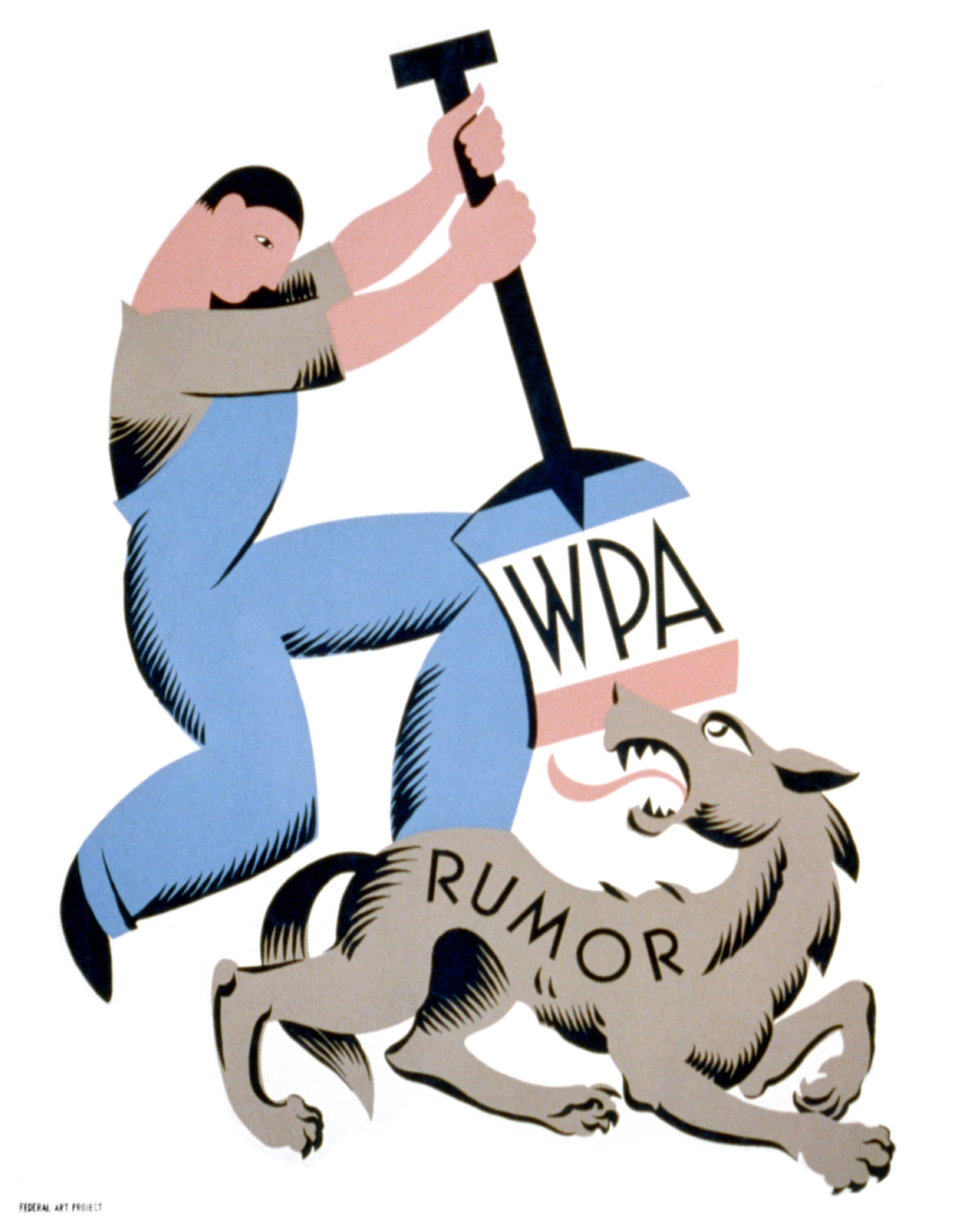
A 1930s Works Progress Administration poster depicts a man with WPA shovel attacking a wolf labeled 'rumor'.

A rumor (American English), or rumour (British English; see spelling differences; derived from Latin rumorem 'noise'), is an unverified piece of information circulating among people, especially without solid evidence.

In the social sciences, a rumor involves a form of a statement whose truthfulness or honesty is not quickly or ever confirmed. In addition, some scholars have identified rumor as a subset of propaganda. Sociology, psychology, and communication studies have widely varying definitions of rumor.

Rumors are also often discussed with regard to misinformation and disinformation or fake news (the former often seen as simply false and the latter seen as deliberately false, though usually from a government source given to the media or a foreign government).

== Early work ==
French and German social science research on rumor locates the modern scholarly definition of it to the pioneering work of the German William Stern in 1902. Stern experimented on rumor involving a "chain of subjects" who passed a story from "mouth to ear" without the right to repeat or explain it. He found that the story was shortened and changed by the time it reached the end of the chain. His student was another pioneer in the field, Gordon Allport.

The experiment is similar to the children's game Chinese whispers.

== A Psychology of Rumor (1944) ==
"A Psychology of Rumor" was published by Robert H. Knapp in 1944, in which he reports on his analysis of over one thousand rumors during World War II that were printed in the Boston Herald's "Rumor Clinic" Column. He defines rumor as

a proposition for belief of topical reference disseminated without official verification. So formidably defined, rumor is but a special case of informal social communications, including myth, legend, and current humor. From myth and legend it is distinguished by its emphasis on the topical. Where humor is designed to provoke laughter, rumor begs for belief.

Knapp identified three basic characteristics that apply to rumor:

1. they're transmitted by word of mouth;
2. they provide "information" about a "person, happening, or condition"; and
3. they express and gratify "the emotional needs of the community."

Crucial to this definition and its characteristics is the emphasis on transmission (word of mouth, which then was heard and reported in the newspaper); on content ("topical" means that it can somehow be distinguished from trivial and private subjects—its domain is public issues); and on reception ("emotional needs of the community" suggests that though it is received by an individual from an individual, it is not comprehended in individual but community or social terms).

Based on his study of the newspaper column, Knapp divided those rumors into three types:

1. Pipe dream rumors: reflect public desires and wished-for outcomes (e.g. Japan's oil reserves were low and thus World War II would soon end).
2. Bogie or fear rumors reflect feared outcomes (e.g. An enemy surprise attack is imminent).
3. Wedge-driving rumors intend to undermine group loyalty or interpersonal relations (e.g. American Catholics were seeking to avoid the draft; German-Americans, Italian-Americans, Japanese-Americans were not loyal to the American side).

Knapp also found that negative rumors were more likely to be disseminated than positive rumors. These types also differentiate between positive (pipe dream) and negative (bogie and wedge-driving) rumors.

== The Psychology of Rumor (1947) ==
In the 1947 study, The Psychology of Rumor, Gordon Allport and Leo Postman concluded that, "as rumor travels it [...] grows shorter, more concise, more easily grasped and told." This conclusion was based on a test of message diffusion between persons, which found that about 70% of details in a message were lost in the first 5-6 mouth-to-mouth transmissions.

In the experiment, a test subject was shown an illustration and given time to look it over. They were then asked to describe the scene from memory to a second test subject. This second test subject was then asked to describe the scene to a third, and so forth and so on. Each person's reproduction was recorded. This process was repeated with different illustrations with very different settings and contents.

Allport and Postman used three terms to describe the movement of rumor. They are: leveling, sharpening, and assimilation. Leveling refers to the loss of detail during the transmission process; sharpening to the selection of certain details of which to transmit; and assimilation to a distortion in the transmission of information as a result of subconscious motivations.

Assimilation was observed when test subjects described the illustrations as they ought to be but not as they actually were. For example, in an illustration depicting a battle-scene, test subjects often incorrectly reported an ambulance truck in the background of the illustration as carrying "medical supplies," when, in fact, it was clearly carrying boxes marked "TNT (102)."

== Social Cognition ==
In 2004, Prashant Bordia and Nicholas DiFonzo published their Problem Solving in Social Interactions on the Internet: Rumor As Social Cognition and found that rumor transmission is probably reflective of a "collective explanation process." This conclusion was based on an analysis of archived message board discussions in which the statements were coded and analysed. It was found that 29% (the majority) of statements within these discussions could be coded as "sense-making" statements, which involved, "[...] attempts at solving a problem."

It was noted that the rest of the discussion was constructed around these statements, further reinforcing the idea of collective problem solving. The researchers also found that each rumor went through a four-stage pattern of development in which a rumor was introduced for discussion, information was volunteered and discussed, and finally a resolution was drawn or interest was lost.

For the study, archived discussions concerning rumors on the internet and other computer networks such as BITnet were retrieved. As a rule, each discussion had a minimum of five statements posted over a period of at least two days. The statements were then coded as being one of the following: prudent, apprehensive, authenticating, interrogatory, providing information, belief, disbelief, sense-making, digressive, or un-codable. Each rumor discussion was then analysed based on this coding system. A similar coding system based on statistical analysis was applied to each discussion as a whole, and the aforementioned four-stage pattern of rumor discussion emerged.

== Political Communication Strategy ==
Rumor has always played a major role in politics, with negative rumors about an opponent typically more effective than positive rumors about one's own side.

"Propaganda is neutrally defined as a systematic form of purposeful persuasion that attempts to influence the emotions, attitudes, opinions, and actions of specified target audiences for ideological, political or commercial purposes through the controlled transmission of one-sided messages (which may or may not be factual) via mass and direct media channels. A propaganda organization employs propagandists who engage in propagandism—the applied creation and distribution of such forms of persuasion."

— Richard Alan Nelson, A Chronology and Glossary of Propaganda in the United States, 1996

In the past, much research on rumor came from psychological approaches (as the discussion of Allport and DiFonzio demonstrates above). The focus was especially on how statements of questionable veracity (absolutely false to the ears of some listeners) circulated orally from person to person. Scholarly attention to political rumors is at least as old as Aristotle's Rhetoric; however, not until recently has any sustained attention and conceptual development been directed at political uses of rumor, outside of its role in war situations. Almost no work had been done until recently on how different forms of media and particular cultural-historical conditions may facilitate a rumor's diffusion.

The Internet's recent appearance as a new media technology has shown ever new possibilities for the fast diffusion of rumor, as the debunking sites such as snopes.com, urbanlegend.com, and factcheck.org demonstrate. Nor had previous research taken into consideration the particular form or style of deliberately chosen rumors for political purposes in particular circumstances (even though significant attention to the power of rumor for mass-media-diffused war propaganda has been in vogue since World War I; see Lasswell 1927). In the early part of the 21st century, some legal scholars have attended to political uses of rumor, though their conceptualization of it remains social psychological and their solutions to it as public problem are from a legal scholarly perspective, largely having to do with libel and privacy laws and the damage to personal reputations.

== Strategic Communication ==
Similar to their appearance and function in political communication, wherein rumors can be deployed for specific deleterious effect (rumor bomb) or can otherwise plague a candidate for office, rumors also play an important role in strategic communication. Strategic communication is the process of crafting messages in support of specific organizational goals, and is usually concerned with governments, militaries and Non-Governmental Organizations (NGOs). Adroit strategic communication requires an understanding of stories, trends and memes circulating within a culture.

Rumors can be viewed as stories that seem rational but that are steeped into speculation, in connection with a certain narrative landscape (the vast array of cultural expression circulating within a community or region). In their book, Narrative Landmines: Rumors, Islamist Extremism and the Struggle for Strategic Influence, co-authors Daniel Bernardi, Pauline Hope Cheong, Chris Lundry and Scott W. Ruston coin the term narrative IED to help explain the function and danger of rumors in a strategic communication context. Rumors, as narrative IEDs, are low-cost, low-tech communication weapons that can be used by anyone to disrupt the efforts of communication, civil affairs or outreach campaigns such as those undertaken by governments in crisis response situations or militaries in insurgencies. As Bernardi notes, "Like their explosive cousins, rumors can be created and planted by nearly anybody, require limited resources to utilize, can be deadly for those in its direct path, and can instil fear".

== See also ==
- Apple community
- Blind item
- Snopes - website for checking the truth of rumors
- Pheme, a project addressing the detection and spread of rumors over social media
- Hoax
- Circular source
- Fake news
- Gossip
- Urban legend
