= List of 2024 box office number-one films in Austria =

This is a list of films which placed number one at the weekend box office for the year 2024.

== Number-one films ==
†	This implies the highest-grossing movie of the year.

Week	Weekend End Date	Film	Total weekend gross (Euro)	Weekend openings in the Top 10	Ref.
1	January 7, 2024	Aquaman and the Lost Kingdom	€375,000	The Boy and the Heron (#5), Next Goal Wins (#7), Nabucco - Verdi (MET 2024) (#8)	
2	January 14, 2024	The Beekeeper	€312,000		
3	January 21, 2024	Anyone but You	€270,000	Poor Things (#5), Rickerl – Musik is höchstens a Hobby (#7), Kolpaçino 4 4'lük (#10)	
4	January 28, 2024	Anyone but You	€310,000	Carmen - Bizet (MET 2024) (#7), Mean Girls (#9), The Holdovers (#10)	
5	February 4, 2024	Anyone but You	€283,000	Autumn and the Black Jaguar (#3), Eine Million Minuten (#5), Butterfly Tale (#10)	
6	February 11, 2024	Anyone but You	€221,000	Night Swim (#6)	
7	February 18, 2024	Anyone but You	€212,000	Madame Web (#2), Bob Marley: One Love (#3), The Taste of Things (#9)	
8	February 25, 2024	Andrea Gets a Divorce	€380,000	Disney Channel Cinema Party (#3)	
9	March 3, 2024	Dune: Part Two	€840,000	Demon Slayer: Kimetsu no Yaiba – To the Hashira Training (#7), The Zone of Interest (#9)	
10	March 10, 2024	Dune: Part Two	€720,000	La forza del destino - Verdi (MET 2024) (#4), The Devil's Bath (#10)	
11	March 17, 2024	Dune: Part Two	€491,000	Kung Fu Panda 4 (#2), Imaginary (#4), Miller's Girl (#6), Maria Montessori (#9)	
12	March 24, 2024	Kung Fu Panda 4	€404,000	Ghostbusters: Frozen Empire (#3), Cocorico (#4), Miller’s Girl (#6), Roméo et Juliette - Gounod (MET 2024) (#6)	
13	March 31, 2024	Chantal im Märchenland	€518,000	PAW Patrol - Easter Special (#6), Wicked Little Letters (#7), One Life (#9)	
14	April 7, 2024	Chantal im Märchenland	€320,000	Godzilla x Kong: The New Empire (#2), Immaculate (#7), There's Still Tomorrow (#8)	
15	April 14, 2024	Chantal im Märchenland	€211,000	Back to Black (#3), The First Omen (#6), Sleeping with a Tiger (#7), SUGA / Agust D - Tour "D-Day" the Movie (#10)	
16	April 21, 2024	Chantal im Märchenland	€296,000	Civil War (#4), La rondine - Puccini (MET 2024) (#7), Abigail (#10)	
17	April 28, 2024	Chantal im Märchenland	€124,590	Challengers (#2), Arthur the King (#7), Spy × Family Code: White (#10)	
18	May 5, 2024	The Fall Guy	€196,000	Star Wars I – The Phantom Menace (25th Anniversary re-release) (#4), Cobweb (#6)	
19	May 12, 2024	The Garfield Movie	€174,000	Kingdom of the Planet of the Apes (#2), Madame Butterfly - Puccini (MET 2024) (#4), Beautiful Wedding (#7)	
20	May 19, 2024	The Garfield Movie	€240,000	IF (#4), Tarot (#5)	
21	May 26, 2024	The Garfield Movie	€158,062	Furiosa: A Mad Max Saga (#2)	
22	June 2, 2024	The Garfield Movie	€310,000		
23	June 9, 2024	Bad Boys: Ride or Die	€390,000	The Glory of Life (#7), The Watchers (#8)	
24	June 16, 2024	Inside Out 2 †	€948,500		
25	June 23, 2024	Inside Out 2 †	€626,751	The Bikeriders (#4), Rite Here Rite Now (#7)	
26	June 30, 2024	Inside Out 2 †	€522,634	A Quiet Place: Day One (#3), Haikyu!! The Dumpster Battle (#5), Elli and the Ghostly Ghost Train (#9)	
27	July 7, 2024	Inside Out 2 †	€498,176	Despicable Me 4 (#2)^{[a]}, A Killer Romance (#5), Kinds of Kindness (#7), MaXXXine (#10)	
28	July 14, 2024	Despicable Me 4	€606,861	Fly Me to the Moon (#4), Führer und Verführer (#7), Sidonie in Japan (#10)	
29	July 21, 2024	Despicable Me 4	€487,447	Twisters (#3), Love Lies Bleeding (#8)	
30	July 28, 2024	Deadpool & Wolverine	€865,784	My Favourite Cake (#7), Zwei zu eins (#8)	
31	August 4, 2024	Deadpool & Wolverine	€791,038	Trap (#4), N'avoue jamais (#6)	
32	August 11, 2024	Deadpool & Wolverine	€457,769	Longlegs (#4), 200% Wolf (#9), The Dead Don't Hurt (#10)	
33	August 18, 2024	It Ends with Us	€371,280	Alien: Romulus (#4)	
33	August 25, 2024	It Ends with Us	€265,071	Horizon: An American Saga – Chapter 1 (#5), Borderlands (#7), Blink Twice (#8), Harold and the Purple Crayon (#10)	
34	September 1, 2024	It Ends with Us	€174,000	Alles Fifty Fifty (#7), AfrAId (#9)	
35	September 8, 2024	It Ends with Us	€138,342	Disney Channel Cinema Party (#4), Was ist schon normal? (#6)	
36	September 15, 2024	Beetlejuice Beetlejuice	€245,209	The Crow (#7)	
37	September 22, 2024	Beetlejuice Beetlejuice	€141,931	Speak No Evil (#3), The Substance (#7), Favoriten (#8), Lee (#9)	
38	September 29, 2024	Die Schule der magischen Tiere 3	€459,995		
39	October 6, 2024	Joker: Folie à Deux	€634,748	The Wild Robot (#3), 80 Plus (#5), Les contes d'Hoffmann - Offenbach (MET 2024/25) (#6),	
40	October 13, 2024	Die Schule der magischen Tiere 3	€268,000	Alles für die Katz (#4), Transformers One (#7), Der Buchspazierer (#8)	
41	October 20, 2024	Smile 2	€328,568	Hagen – Im Tal der Nibelungen (#5), The Apprentice (#7)	
42	October 27, 2024	Venom: The Last Dance	€472,000	Woodwalkers (#4)	
43	November 3, 2024	Venom: The Last Dance	€444,000	Terrifier 3 (#2), Alter weißer Mann (#6), Rubble & Crew: Das große Kinoabenteuer (#9)	
44	November 10, 2024	Red One	€352,000	Niko - Reise zu den Polarlichtern (#4)	
45	November 17, 2024	Gladiator II	€571,000		
46	November 24, 2024	Gladiator II	€400,000	Conclave (#3), Tosca - Puccini (MET 2024/25) (#5)	
47	December 1, 2024	Moana 2	€994,000	Der Vierer (#7), Emilia Pérez (#8)	
48	December 8, 2024	Moana 2	€700,000	Bagman (#7), The Outrun (#10)	
49	December 15, 2024	Moana 2	€490,292	Wicked (#2), Kraven the Hunter (#5), The Lord of the Rings: The War of the Rohirrim (#7)	
50	December 22, 2024	Mufasa: The Lion King	€566,000	Der Spitzname (#4)	
51	December 29, 2024	Mufasa: The Lion King	€625,000	Sonic the Hedgehog 3 (#4), Die Heinzels – Neue Mützen, neue Mission (#7), Heretic (#8)	

== Records ==
=== Highest-grossing films ===
Rank	Title	Domestic gross	Country
1.	Inside Out 2	€6,326,483	United States
2.	Deadpool & Wolverine	€5,763,043	United States
3.	Despicable Me 4	€5,433,776	United States
4.	Dune: Part Two	€4,625,585	United States
5.	Chantal im Märchenland	€2,921,680	Germany

=== Biggest opening weekends ===
Rank	Title	Distributor	Opening Weekend
1	Moana 2	Disney	€994,000
2	Inside Out 2	Disney	€948,500
3	Deadpool & Wolverine	Disney	€865,784
4	Dune: Part Two	Warner Bros. Pictures	€840,000
5	Joker: Folie à Deux	Warner Bros. Pictures	€634,748

=== Biggest opening and regular weekends ===
Rank	Title	Distributor	Opening Weekend
1	Moana 2	Disney	€994,000
2	Inside Out 2	Disney	€948,500
3	Deadpool & Wolverine	Disney	€865,784
4	Dune: Part Two	Warner Bros. Pictures	€840,000
5	Deadpool & Wolverine	Disney	€791,038

=== Certifications ===
These certifications are awarded by the Austrian Economic Chamber and the association of film distributors and sales companies (Verband der Filmverleih- und Vertriebsgesellschaften) for films that sold more than 300,000 (Golden Ticket), 600,000 (Platinum Ticket) or 1,000,000 (Diamond Ticket) tickets in a given calendar year. Austria Ticket is awarded to Austrian film productions with over 75,000 admissions. Movies currently without a certification may be eligible but have not been awarded one yet.

Title	Certification	Admissions
Inside Out 2	Platinum Ticket	638,491
Despicable Me 4	Golden Ticket	524,612
Moana 2	Golden Ticket	470,109
Deadpool & Wolverine	Golden Ticket	431,798
Dune: Part Two	Golden Ticket	329,593
Migration	Golden Ticket	316,543
Andrea Gets a Divorce	Austria Ticket	182,779

== Notes ==
^{a} It charted on the box office before its official release date due to strong preview numbers.

== See also ==
- Cinema of Austria
- 2024 in Austria

Preceded by 2023	Box office number-one films 2024	Succeeded by 2025
