= List of 2025 box office number-one films in Austria =

This is a list of films which placed number one at the weekend box office for the year 2025.

In 2025, the Austrian box office exceeded the previous year’s performance early on, with total gross revenue reaching €124.6 million, representing a 12.3% increase compared to the same period in 2024. This figure also surpassed the comparable gross of 2023.

== Number-one films ==
Week	Weekend End Date	Film	Total weekend gross (Euro)	Weekend openings in the Top 10	Ref.
1	January 5, 2025	Mufasa: The Lion King	€613,000	Nosferatu (#5), Better Man (#8)	
2	January 12, 2025	Mufasa: The Lion King	€356,000	We Live in Time (#6)	
3	January 19, 2025	Mufasa: The Lion King	€267,872	Den of Thieves 2: Pantera (#2), A Real Pain (#9)	
4	January 26, 2025	Mufasa: The Lion King	€200,000	Die drei ??? und der Karpatenhund (#2), The Count of Monte Cristo (#3), Aida - Verdi (MET 2024/25) (#4)	
5	February 2, 2025	Paddington in Peru	€329,809	Babygirl (#3), The Brutalist (#8)	
6	February 9, 2025	Paddington in Peru	€291,000	Maria (#6), Companion (#10)	
7	February 16, 2025	Captain America: Brave New World	€420,000	Wunderschöner (#3)	
8	February 23, 2025	Captain America: Brave New World	€212,096	Disney Channel Cinema Party (#3), Flight Risk (#6), The Monkey (#7)	
9	March 2, 2025	Bridget Jones: Mad About the Boy	€207,000	A Complete Unknown (#2), Ein Mädchen namens Willow (#5)	
10	March 9, 2025	Bridget Jones: Mad About the Boy	€151,384	Mickey 17 (#2), The Day Iceland Stood Still (#10)	
11	March 16, 2025	Bridget Jones: Mad About the Boy	€170,000	Fidelio - Beethoven (MET 2024/25) (#6)	
12	March 23, 2025	Snow White	€253,000	Novocaine (#3)	
13	March 30, 2025	Snow White	€232,829	Ne Zha 2 (#7)	
14	April 6, 2025	A Minecraft Movie	€1,625,000	Biggest opening and regular weekend of the year. This was also the best weekend for a movie since January 2023 when Avatar: The Way of Water grossed €1,740,000. Altweibersommer (#3), Eden (#8)	
15	April 13, 2025	A Minecraft Movie	€911,710	The Amateur (#2), A Working Man (#3), Jamais sans mon psy (#4), Moon le panda (#8), The Chosen Last Supper: Part 1 (#9), Dog Man (#10)	
16	April 20, 2025	A Minecraft Movie	€537,726	Sinners (#4), Drop (#6), Warfare (#10)	
17	April 27, 2025	A Minecraft Movie	€342,174	Star Wars: Episode III – Revenge of the Sith (20th Anniversary) (#2), The Accountant 2 (#3), Le nozze di Figaro - Mozart (MET 2024/25) (#4), Until Dawn (#6), The Penguin Lessons (#9)	
18	May 4, 2025	Thunderbolts*	€245,830	Bambi, a Life in the Woods (#10)	
19	May 11, 2025	Thunderbolts*	€169,787	Final Destination Bloodlines (#3)^{a}	
20	May 18, 2025	Final Destination Bloodlines^{a}	€238,036	Salome - Strauss (MET 2024/25) (#4), Black Bag (#5)	
21	May 25, 2025	Lilo & Stitch	€932,546	Mission: Impossible – The Final Reckoning (#2)^{b}, Monsieur Aznavour (#8)	
22	June 1, 2025	Lilo & Stitch	€563,688	Peppa Meets the Baby Cinema Experience (#2), Karate Kid: Legends (#5), Il barbiere di Siviglia - Rossini (MET 2024/25) (#6), The Phoenician Scheme (#7), Clown in a Cornfield (#8)	
23	June 8, 2025	Lilo & Stitch	€546,526	Ballerina (#3)	
24	June 15, 2025	How to Train Your Dragon	€343,230	Guns Up (#10)	
25	June 22, 2025	How to Train Your Dragon	€240,446	28 Years Later (#3), Elio (#6)	
26	June 29, 2025	F1	€377,676	M3GAN 2.0 (#7), Heidi: Rescue of the Lynx (#9)	
27	July 6, 2025	Jurassic World Rebirth	€579,821		
28	July 13, 2025	Jurassic World Rebirth	€425,602	Superman (#3)	
29	July 20, 2025	Jurassic World Rebirth	€237,153	I Know What You Did Last Summer (#6), The Salt Path (#7)	
30	July 27, 2025	The Fantastic Four: First Steps	€316,825	Grand Prix of Europe (#7)	
31	August 3, 2025	The Naked Gun	€307,110		
32	August 10, 2025	Weapons			
33	August 17, 2025	Das Kanu des Manitu	€1,600,000	Bring Her Back (#9)	
34	August 24, 2025	Das Kanu des Manitu	€1,420,000	Materialists (#2), Kangaroo (#4), Nobody 2 (#7)	
35	August 31, 2025	Das Kanu des Manitu	€1,003,149	The Bad Guys 2 (#2), The Roses (#4), Caught Stealing (#9)	
36	September 7, 2025	The Conjuring: Last Rites	€718,000	22 Bahnen (#5), Tafiti – Ab durch die Wüste (#7)	
37	September 14, 2025	Das Kanu des Manitu	€468,000	Disney Channel Cinema Party (#4), The Long Walk (#6)	
38	September 21, 2025	Demon Slayer: Kimetsu no Yaiba – The Movie: Infinity Castle^{c}	€665,000	Downton Abbey: The Grand Finale (#4), Ganzer halber Bruder (#6)	
39	September 28, 2025	Die Schule der magischen Tiere 4	€468,000	One Battle After Another (#4)	
40	October 5, 2025	Die Schule der magischen Tiere 4	€465,000	Taylor Swift: The Official Release Party of a Showgirl (#3), Momo (#7), A Big Bold Beautiful Journey (#10)	
41	October 12, 2025	Die Schule der magischen Tiere 4	€250,900	Tron: Ares (#3), Gabby's Dollhouse: The Movie (#5)	
42	October 19, 2025	Die Schule der magischen Tiere 4	€180,000	Neo Nuggets – Eine Pulled Pork Komödie (#2), La Sonnambula MET Opera Live (#4), Good Fortune (#6), Stitch Head (#10)	
43	October 26, 2025	Die Schule der magischen Tiere 4	€151,000	Regretting You (#3), Black Phone 2 (#4), Pumuckl und das große Missverständnis (#5)^{a}, Chainsaw Man – The Movie: Reze Arc (#6), Downhill Skiers – Ain't No Mountain Steep Enough (#8), Springsteen: Deliver Me from Nowhere (#9)	
44	November 2, 2025	Pumuckl und das große Missverständnis^{a}	€312,000	Dracula (#6), Bugonia (#10)	
45	November 9, 2025	Pumuckl und das große Missverständnis^{a}	€241,000	Predator: Badlands (#2), La Bohème MET Opera Live (#5)	
46	November 16, 2025	Now You See Me: Now You Don't	€182,700	The Running Man (#3), Paw Patrol Christmas Special (#6)	
46	November 23, 2025	Aufputzt is’	€360,000	Wicked: For Good (#2), Arabella MET Opera Live (#5)	
47	November 30, 2025	Zootopia 2	€692,000	Jujutsu Kaisen: Execution (#6), Roofman (#10)	
48	December 7, 2025	Zootopia 2	€697,000	Five Nights at Freddy's 2 (#3), Sentimental Value (#9)	
49	December 14, 2025	Zootopia 2	€489,000	Andrea Chénier MET Opera Live (#5), Bibi Blocksberg – Das große Hexentreffen (#9)	
50	December 21, 2025	Avatar: Fire and Ash	€1,390,000	The SpongeBob Movie: Search for SquarePants (#4)^{a}	
51	December 28, 2025	Avatar: Fire and Ash	€1,520,000	Anaconda (#4), The SpongeBob Movie: Search for SquarePants (#5)^{a}, The Physician 2 (#6)	

== Records ==
=== Highest-grossing films ===
Rank	Title	Domestic gross	Country
1.	Das Kanu des Manitu	€9,670,000	Germany
2.	A Minecraft Movie	€5,676,012	United States
3.	Avatar: Fire and Ash	€5,600,000	United States
4.	Lilo & Stitch	€4,383,066	United States
5.	Zootopia 2	€4,182,000	United States

=== Biggest opening weekends ===
Rank	Title	Distributor	Opening Weekend
1	A Minecraft Movie	Warner Bros.	€1,625,000
2	Das Kanu des Manitu	Constantin Film	€1,600,000
3	Avatar: Fire and Ash	Disney	€1,390,000
4	Lilo & Stitch	Disney	€932,546
5	The Conjuring: Last Rites	Universal	€718,000

=== Biggest opening and regular weekends ===
Rank	Title	Distributor	Weekend gross
1	A Minecraft Movie	Warner Bros.	€1,625,000
2	Das Kanu des Manitu	Constantin Film	€1,600,000
3	Avatar: Fire and Ash	Disney	€1,520,000
4	Das Kanu des Manitu	Constantin Film	€1,420,000
5	Avatar: Fire and Ash	Disney	€1,390,000

=== Certifications ===
These certifications are awarded by the Austrian Economic Chamber and the association of film distributors and sales companies (Verband der Filmverleih- und Vertriebsgesellschaften) for films that sold more than 300,000 (Golden Ticket), 600,000 (Platinum Ticket) or 1,000,000 (Diamond Ticket) tickets in a given calendar year. Austria Ticket is awarded to Austrian film productions with over 75,000 admissions. Movies currently without a certification may be eligible but have not been awarded one yet.

Title	Certification	Admissions
Das Kanu des Manitu	Platinum Ticket	881,141
A Minecraft Movie	Golden Ticket	501,551
Mufasa: The Lion King	Golden Ticket	434,468
Lilo & Stitch	Golden Ticket	426,249
Aufputzt is’	Austria Ticket	227,633

== Notes ==
^aIt charted on the box office before its official release date due to strong preview numbers.
^bMission: Impossible grossed over €500,000 from previews, equaling its official opening weekend take. With over €1 million in total earnings during its first full week, it came close to matching Lilo & Stitch's overall box office result, which led the charts that week.
^cDemon Slayer: Kimetsu no Yaiba – Infinity Castle grossed €665,000 during its official opening weekend (Friday–Sunday). Including Thursday previews, the film would have earned over €1 million, which would have made it the third-best opening of 2025 at that point, behind A Minecraft Movie and Das Kanu des Manitu (or the fourth-best, if Mission: Impossible’s previews were also included in its weekend gross).

== See also ==
- Cinema of Austria
- 2025 in Austria

Preceded by 2024	Box office number-one films 2025	Succeeded by 2026
