= Tours de Levallois =

- Interactive map of the Tours de Levallois area

General information
- Type: Office
- Location: Levallois-Perret (west of Paris)
- Coordinates: 48°54′4″N 2°17′12″E

Height
- Antenna spire: 165 m (541 ft)
- Roof: 165 m (541 ft)

Technical details
- Floor count: 42
- Floor area: 100,000 m^{2} (1,100,000 sq ft)

Design and construction
- Architects: Sylvain Glaiman, Pierre Epstein

Tours de Levallois was a project to build two office skyscrapers in Levallois-Perret, in the inner suburbs of Paris, France. This project was canceled in 2011, following the reluctance of local residents.

== History ==
The structures that once stood on the site designated for the construction of the towers were demolished in September 2006. The preparation phase was scheduled to start by March 2007, and the construction of the building in itself should have started in August 2007. The towers, were originally planned to be delivered by 2009.

In 2008, Mohamed Bin Issa Al Jaber was presented as the new investor behind the project. Construction was suspended in the following months due to payment delays. In February 2011, the city of Levallois was seeking new investors. It filed a complaint against Al Jaber, which resulted in Al Jaber's planning application to be revoked. The land allocated to the project was then bought back by investment bank BNP Paribas, which intended to make offices.

In September 2011, many Levallois residents mobilized to protest this project because of its impacts on traffic, pollution, noise, and views. Faced with this mobilization, the mayor of Levallois-Perret at the time, Patrick Balkany, decided to abandon the project.

== Designs ==
The towers were designed to stand 165 meters tall and be located above a 3-storey shopping mall, and a car park with a capacity of 1,600 vehicles. The towers, of identical design, were planned to host strictly corporate offices.

== See also ==
- Skyscraper
- List of tallest structures in Paris
