= Burgenländisches Schulungszentrum =

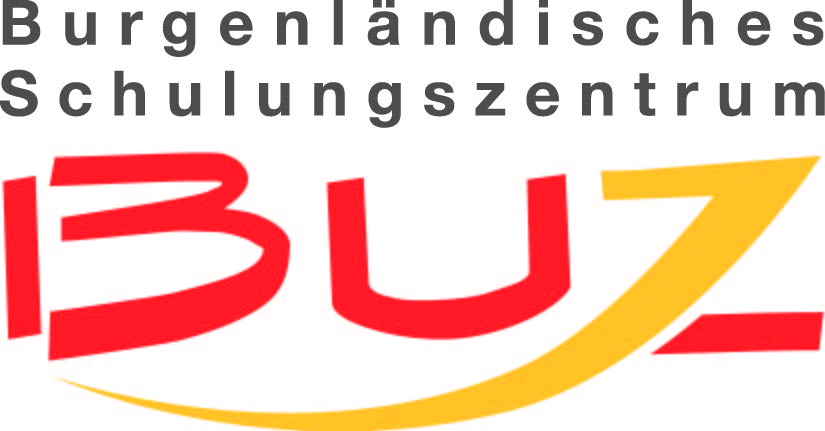

Location
- Hans Nießl-Platz 1 Neutal, Burgenland, 7343; Austria

Information
- Type: Adult education college
- Established: 1975
- Ofsted: Reports
- Chief Executive: Christian Vlasich
- Staff: 80
- Gender: Mixed
- Age: 18 to no upper age limit
- Website: www.buz.at

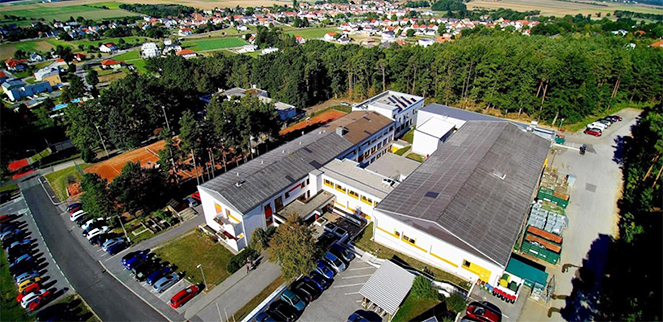
Burgenländisches Schulungszentrum in Neutal

Burgenländisches Schulungszentrum (BUZ) is an adult education college in Neutal, Austria, which offers full-time and part-time courses in areas such as metal technology, electrical engineering, and information technology.

== Organisation ==
Burgenländisches Schulungszentrum is supported by:

- Republic of Austria represented by the local Arbeitsmarktservice
- Austrian Chamber of Labour
- Austrian Federal Economic Chamber
- Burgenländische Landesregierung
- Neutal

=== Executive Board ===
- Chairman: WHR DI Hans Godowitsch

members:

- Gerhard Michalitsch
- Mag. Josef Stiglitz
- Mag. Klaus Trummer
- Erich Trummer (mayor of Neutal)
- Mag. (FH) Christian Vlasich

== Courses ==
Burgenländisches Schulungszentrum offers over 50 courses including subjects in the areas of information and communications technology, electrical engineering, metal technology. The college also offers specialist areas, including courses for people with learning difficulties.
