= List of 2022 box office number-one films in Austria =

This is a list of films which placed number one at the weekend box office for the year 2022.

== Number-one films ==
†	This implies the highest-grossing movie of the year.

Week	Weekend End Date	Film	Total weekend gross (Euro)	Weekend openings in the Top 10	Ref.
1	January 2, 2022	Spider-Man: No Way Home	€462,253	Cinderella - Massenet (MET 2022) (#7)	
2	January 9, 2022	Spider-Man: No Way Home	€454,000	The King's Man (#3), The 355 (#8)	
3	January 16, 2022	Spider-Man: No Way Home	€292,000	Scream (#2), Spencer (#6)	
4	January 23, 2022	Sing 2	€264,000	Nightmare Alley (#8)	
5	January 30, 2022	Sing 2	€261,000	Rigoletto - Verdi (MET 2022) live (#6), Licorice Pizza (#8)	
6	February 6, 2022	Sing 2	€193,000	Wunderschön (#3), Around the World in 80 Days (#7), Aykut Enişte 2 (#10)	
7	February 13, 2022	Sing 2	€165,000	Death on the Nile (#2), Moonfall (#3), Marry Me (#6)	
8	February 20, 2022	Uncharted	€556,106		
9	February 27, 2022	Uncharted	€407,856	King Richard (#9), Belfast (#10)	
10	March 6, 2022	The Batman	€600,000		
11	March 13, 2022	The Batman	€429,000	Jackass Forever (#3), BTS Permission To Dance On Stage Seoul (#4), Bergen (#5), The Hating Game (#8), Parallel Mothers (#10)	
12	March 20, 2022	The Batman	€266,532	The Bad Guys (#2), Die Häschenschule - Der große Eierklau (#5), The Wolf and the Lion (#7)	
13	March 27, 2022	The Batman	€141,000	Rotzbub (#2), Ambulance (#4), Carlos - Verdi (MET 2022) live (#9)	
14	April 3, 2022	Sonic the Hedgehog 2	€364,000	Morbius (#2), Jujutsu Kaisen 0 (#9)	
15	April 10, 2022	Fantastic Beasts: The Secrets of Dumbledore	€756,000		
16	April 17, 2022	Fantastic Beasts: The Secrets of Dumbledore	€425,000	Geschichten vom Franz (#6), Eingeschlossene Gesellschaft (#10)	
17	April 24, 2022	Fantastic Beasts: The Secrets of Dumbledore	€300,000	The Lost City (#2), The Northman (#4), Der Bauer und der Bobo (#8)	
18	May 1, 2022	Fantastic Beasts: The Secrets of Dumbledore	€198,000	Downton Abbey: A New Era (#7)	
19	May 8, 2022	Doctor Strange in the Multiverse of Madness	€1,000,000	Die Biene Maja - Das geheime Königreich (#4), Turandot - Puccini (MET 2022) (#8), Der Onkel (#10)	
20	May 15, 2022	Doctor Strange in the Multiverse of Madness	€481,000	Firestarter (#8), Spoiled Brats (#9)	
21	May 22, 2022	Doctor Strange in the Multiverse of Madness	€250,000	Dog (#2), Lucia di Lammermoor - Donizetti (MET 2022) (#4), Everything Everywhere All at Once (#8)	
22	May 29, 2022	Top Gun: Maverick	€730,000	Immenhof - Das große Versprechen (#7)	
23	June 5, 2022	Top Gun: Maverick	€660,000	Paw Patrol: Jet to the Rescue (#6)	
24	June 12, 2022	Jurassic World Dominion	€620,000	Belle (#10)	
25	June 19, 2022	Jurassic World Dominion	€303,000	Lightyear (#3), The Unbearable Weight of Massive Talent (#5)	
26	June 26, 2022	Top Gun: Maverick	€236,000	Elvis (#3), The Black Phone (#4)	
27	July 3, 2022	Minions: The Rise of Gru	€516,090		
28	July 10, 2022	Thor: Love and Thunder	€706,000	Liebesdings (#6), Corsage (#8), Alfons Zitterbacke - Endlich Klassenfahrt! (#10)	
29	July 17, 2022	Thor: Love and Thunder	€348,000	The Owners (#9)	
30	July 24, 2022	Minions: The Rise of Gru	€246,000	Qu'est-ce qu'on a tous fait au Bon Dieu? (#3), Bibi & Tina – Einfach anders (#6)	
31	July 31, 2022	Minions: The Rise of Gru	€289,000	DC League of Super-Pets (#4)	
32	August 7, 2022	{{|ill|Guglhupfgeschwader|de}}	€576,000	Bullet Train (#3)	
33	August 14, 2022	{{|ill|Guglhupfgeschwader|de}}	€347,000	Nope (#8)	
34	August 21, 2022	{{|ill|Guglhupfgeschwader|de}}	€347,978	Where the Crawdads Sing (#6), Märzengrund (#6)	
35	August 28, 2022	{{|ill|Guglhupfgeschwader|de}}	€184,794	After Ever Happy (#2), The Kangaroo Conspiracy (#8), The Invitation (#10)	
36	September 4, 2022	After Ever Happy	€103,000	Good Luck to You, Leo Grande (#5), Dragon Ball Super: Super Hero (#7)	
37	September 11, 2022	Guglhupfgeschwader	€96,000	Orphan: First Kill (#3)	
38	September 18, 2022	Ticket to Paradise	€331,000	Last Seen Alive (#2), Jeepers Creepers: Reborn (#9)	
39	September 25, 2022	Ticket to Paradise	€227,000	Avatar (#2), Don't Worry Darling (#3)	
40	October 2, 2022	Die Schule der magischen Tiere 2	€366,000	Smile (#3), Tausend Zeilen (#9)	
41	October 9, 2022	Smile	€319,000	Love Machine 2 (#4), The Woman King (#8)	
42	October 16, 2022	Smile	€381,925	Halloween Ends (#2), One Piece Film: Red (#5), Triangle of Sadness (#6)	
43	October 23, 2022	Black Adam	€364,000	Family Affairs (#5), Lyle, Lyle, Crocodile (#7), Die Mucklas und wie sie zu Pettersson und Findus kamen (#10)	
44	October 30, 2022	Black Adam	€269,000	Live Broadcast from Buenos Aires (#7), Eismayer (#10)	
45	November 6, 2022	Black Adam	€180,000	Hui Buh und das Hexenschloss (#2), Rhinegold (#3), Prey for the Devil (#7)	
46	November 13, 2022	Black Panther: Wakanda Forever	€664,000	Mrs. Harris Goes to Paris (#9)	
47	November 20, 2022	Black Panther: Wakanda Forever	€424,292	The Menu (#2), Just Something Nice (#4), Ein Weihnachtsfest für Teddy (#8), The Magic Flute (#9)	
48	November 27, 2022	Black Panther: Wakanda Forever	€210,000	Strange World (#2)	
49	December 4, 2022	Black Panther: Wakanda Forever	€154,000	Violent Night (#2)	
50	December 11, 2022	Black Panther: Wakanda Forever	€115,000	Der Räuber Hotzenplotz (#2), She Said (#7), The Hours - Puts/Pierce (MET 2022) live (#9)	
51	December 18, 2022	Avatar: The Way of Water †	€1,690,000	Biggest opening and regular weekend of the year. The original in 2009 was released to an opening of one million euros.	
52	December 25, 2022	Avatar: The Way of Water †	€1,000,000	Puss in Boots: The Last Wish (#2), Whitney Houston: I Wanna Dance with Somebody (#7), Oskars Kleid (#10)	
53	January 1, 2023	Avatar: The Way of Water †	€1,180,000	Was man von hier aus sehen kann (#8)	

== Records ==
=== Highest-grossing films ===
Rank	Title	Domestic gross	Country
1.	Avatar: The Way of Water	€7,760,000	United States
2.	Top Gun: Maverick	€5,800,000	United States
3.	Minions: The Rise of Gru	€4,770,000	United States
4.	Doctor Strange in the Multiverse of Madness	€3,360,000	United States
5.	Thor: Love and Thunder	€3,000,000	United States

=== Biggest opening weekends ===
Rank	Title	Distributor	Opening Weekend
1	Avatar: The Way of Water	Disney	€1,690,000
2	Doctor Strange in the Multiverse of Madness	Disney	€1,000,000
3	Fantastic Beasts: The Secrets of Dumbledore	Warner Bros	€756,000
4	Top Gun: Maverick	Paramount	€730,000
5	Thor: Love and Thunder	Disney	€706,000

=== Biggest opening and regular weekends ===
Rank	Title	Distributor	Opening Weekend
1	Avatar: The Way of Water	Disney	€1,690,000
2	Avatar: The Way of Water	Disney	€1,180,000
3	Avatar: The Way of Water	Disney	€1,000,000
4	Doctor Strange in the Multiverse of Madness	Disney	€1,000,000
5	Fantastic Beasts: The Secrets of Dumbledore	Warner Bros	€756,000

=== Certifications ===
These certifications are awarded by the Austrian Economic Chamber and the association of film distributors and sales companies (Verband der Filmverleih- und Vertriebsgesellschaften) for films that sold more than 300,000 (Golden Ticket), 600,000 (Platinum Ticket) or 1,000,000 (Diamond Ticket) tickets in a given calendar year. Austria Ticket is awarded to Austrian film productions with over 75,000 admissions. Avatar: The Way of Water was the first time in 13 years to be awarded the Diamond Ticket for reaching the threshold of 1,000,000 admissions, a feat not seen since the first Avatar movie.

Title	Certification	Admissions
Avatar: The Way of Water	Diamond Ticket	1,133,655
Top Gun: Maverick	Golden Ticket	592,749
Minions: The Rise of Gru	Golden Ticket	537,774
Puss in Boots: The Last Wish	Golden Ticket	301,731
Rotzbub - Willkommen in Siegheilkirchen	Austria Ticket	101,785
Geschichten vom Franz	Austria Ticket	85,700

== See also ==
- Cinema of Austria

Preceded by 2021	2022	Succeeded by 2023
