= List of 2023 box office number-one films in Austria =

This is a list of films which placed number one at the weekend box office for the year 2023.

== Number-one films ==
†	This implies the highest-grossing movie of the year.

Week	Weekend End Date	Film	Total weekend gross (Euro)	Weekend openings in the Top 10	Ref.
1	January 8, 2023	Avatar: The Way of Water	€1,740,000	Operation Fortune: Ruse de Guerre (#3), The Banshees of Inisherin (#7)	
2	January 15, 2023	Avatar: The Way of Water	€1,100,000	M3GAN (#3), Der Fuchs (#4)	
3	January 22, 2023	Avatar: The Way of Water	€775,000	This weekend Avatar: The Way of Water passed the €14 million mark becoming the highest-grossing film in Austria (nominally and adjusted for inflation) Shotgun Wedding (#5), Babylon (#6)	
4	January 29, 2023	Avatar: The Way of Water	€563,000	Die drei ??? – Erbe des Drachen (#3), Pathaan (#10)	
5	February 5, 2023	Avatar: The Way of Water	€465,000	Plane (#2), A Man Called Otto (#5), BTS - Yet to Come in Cinemas (#8)	
6	February 12, 2023	Avatar: The Way of Water	€322,000	On its ninth weekend at number one, Avatar surpassed The Intouchables as the longest-reigning number one film since records began. Magic Mike's Last Dance (#2), The Amazing Maurice (#4), Titanic (#8)	
7	February 19, 2023	Ant-Man and the Wasp: Quantumania	€448,000	Mummies (#4), Perfect Addiction (#10)	
8	February 26, 2023	Griechenland	€437,000	Missing (#10)	
9	March 5, 2023	Creed III	€570,000	Tár (#7)	
10	March 12, 2023	Creed III	€360,000	Scream VI (#3), 65 (#6), The Fabelmans (#9)	
11	March 19, 2023	Griechenland	€177,000	Shazam! Fury of the Gods (#4)	
12	March 26, 2023	John Wick: Chapter 4	€679,000	Überflieger: Das Geheimnis des großen Juwels (#5), Louis Tomlinson - All of Those Voices (#10)	
13	April 2, 2023	John Wick: Chapter 4	€515,000	Manta Manta – Zwoter Teil (#2), Dungeons & Dragons: Honor Among Thieves (#3)	
14	April 9, 2023	The Super Mario Bros. Movie	€1,270,000	The Pope's Exorcist (#5), Beautiful Disaster (#6), Air (#8)	
15	April 16, 2023	The Super Mario Bros. Movie	€1,320,000	Cocaine Bear (#4), Suzume (#9), Der Rosenkavalier - Strauss MET 2023 Live (#10)	
16	April 23, 2023	The Super Mario Bros. Movie	€738,000	Hals über Kopf (#6)	
17	April 30, 2023	The Super Mario Bros. Movie	€636,000	In terms of admissions, this week Super Mario not only became the most successful animated movie of the post-pandemic era with 540,000 tickets sold but also the second most successful film by Illumination after Minions. Evil Dead Rise (#2), The Whale (#4)	
18	May 7, 2023	Guardians of the Galaxy Vol. 3	€706,000		
19	May 14, 2023	Guardians of the Galaxy Vol. 3	€601,660	Book Club: The Next Chapter (#3), Sisu (#7)	
20	May 21, 2023	Fast X	€700,000	Asterix & Obelix: The Middle Kingdom (#4)	
21	May 28, 2023	Fast X	€394,000	The Little Mermaid (#2), Renfield (#6), About My Father (#7)	
22	June 4, 2023	The Little Mermaid	€236,000	Spider-Man: Across the Spider-Verse (#3), The Boogeyman (#5), Die Zauberflote - Met Opera 2023 (#6)	
23	June 11, 2023	The Little Mermaid	€200,000	Transformers: Rise of the Beasts (#3), Mavka: The Forest Song (#9)	
24	June 18, 2023	The Flash	€118,000	Asteroid City (#6)	
25	June 25, 2023	Elemental	€215,000	No Hard Feelings (#2)	
26	July 2, 2023	Indiana Jones and the Dial of Destiny	€405,493	Ruby Gillman, Teenage Kraken (#9)	
27	July 9, 2023	Indiana Jones and the Dial of Destiny	€166,000	Insidious: The Red Door (#2), Ladybug & Cat Noir: The Movie (#3), Alma und Oskar (#10)	
28	July 16, 2023	Mission: Impossible – Dead Reckoning Part One	€293,000		
29	July 23, 2023	Barbie †	€850,000	Oppenheimer (#2)	
30	July 30, 2023	Barbie †	€910,000	Haunted Mansion (#6), Lassie - A New Adventure (#7), Talk to Me (#10)	
31	August 6, 2023	Barbie †	€894,000	Meg 2: The Trench (#3), Teenage Mutant Ninja Turtles: Mutant Mayhem (#7)	
32	August 13, 2023	Rehragout-Rendezvous	€453,000	Gran Turismo (#5)	
33	August 20, 2023	Rehragout-Rendezvous	€306,000	Blue Beetle (#6), The Last Voyage of the Demeter (#7), Kandahar (#10)	
34	August 27, 2023	Rehragout-Rendezvous	€315,000	Ponyherz - Wild und frei (#9)	
35	September 3, 2023	The Equalizer 3	€214,000	Strays (#8)	
36	September 10, 2023	The Equalizer 3	€129,000	Neue Geschichten vom Franz (#6), Kurz - der Film (#8), My Big Fat Greek Wedding 3 (#10)	
37	September 17, 2023	A Haunting in Venice	€114,000	Retribution (#8)	
38	September 24, 2023	The Nun II	€465,329	Expend4bles (#2), Projekt Ballhausplatz (#10)	
39	October 1, 2023	PAW Patrol: The Mighty Movie	€280,000		
40	October 8, 2023	PAW Patrol: The Mighty Movie	€219,000	Pulled Pork (#2), The Exorcist: Believer (#4), Checker Tobi und die Reise zu den fliegenden Flüssen (#6)	
41	October 15, 2023	Taylor Swift: The Eras Tour	€285,000	Das fliegende Klassenzimmer (#7)	
42	October 22, 2023	Killers of the Flower Moon	€170,000		
43	October 29, 2023	Five Nights at Freddy's	€225,000	Neue Geschichten vom Pumuckl (#7), Die unlangweiligste Schule der Welt (#9)	
44	November 5, 2023	Trolls Band Together	€161,000	Neue Geschichten vom Pumuckl (#7), Die unlangweiligste Schule der Welt (#9)	
45	November 12, 2023	The Marvels	€242,000	Ein ganzes Leben (#2), Atatürk (#7)	
46	November 19, 2023	The Hunger Games: The Ballad of Songbirds & Snakes	€373,000	Thanksgiving (#6)	
47	November 26, 2023	Napoleon	€391,000		
48	December 3, 2023	Wish	€300,000	Saw X (#4), Wie kommen wir da wieder raus? (#5), Renaissance: A Film by Beyoncé (#8)	
49	December 10, 2023	Wonka	€417,542	Florencia en el Amazonas - Catán (MET 2023) (#7), Das Beste kommt noch! (#9), Murat Gögebakan - Kalbim Yarali (#9)	
50	December 17, 2023	Wonka	€301,000		
51	December 24, 2023	Wonka			
52	December 31, 2023	Aquaman and the Lost Kingdom	€315,000		

== Records ==
=== Highest-grossing films ===
Rank	Title	Domestic gross	Country
1.	Barbie	€8,000,000	United States, United Kingdom
2.	The Super Mario Bros. Movie	€7,317,000	United States
3.	Avatar: The Way of Water	€7,267,000	United States
4.	Oppenheimer	€6,600,000	United States, United Kingdom
5.	Guardians of the Galaxy Vol. 3	€3,193,000	United States

=== Biggest opening weekends ===
Rank	Title	Distributor	Opening Weekend
1	The Super Mario Bros. Movie	Universal	€1,270,000
2	Barbie	Warner Bros	€850,000
3	Oppenheimer	Universal	€738,000
4	Guardians of the Galaxy Vol. 3	Disney	€706,000
5	Fast X	Universal	€700,000

=== Biggest opening and regular weekends ===
Rank	Title	Distributor	Opening Weekend
1	Avatar: The Way of Water	Disney	€1,740,000
2	The Super Mario Bros. Movie	Universal	€1,320,000
3	The Super Mario Bros. Movie	Universal	€1,270,000
4	Avatar: The Way of Water	Disney	€1,100,000
5	Barbie	Warner Bros	€910,000

=== Certifications ===
These certifications are awarded by the Austrian Economic Chamber and the association of film distributors and sales companies (Verband der Filmverleih- und Vertriebsgesellschaften) for films that sold more than 300,000 (Golden Ticket), 600,000 (Platinum Ticket) or 1,000,000 (Diamond Ticket) tickets in a given calendar year. Austria Ticket is awarded to Austrian film productions with over 75,000 admissions. Movies currently without a certification may be eligible but have not been awarded one yet.

Title	Certification	Admissions
Avatar: The Way of Water	Diamond Ticket	1,161,090
Barbie	Platinum Ticket	799,811
The Super Mario Bros. Movie	Platinum Ticket	691,863
Oppenheimer	Golden Ticket	506,127
Puss in Boots: The Last Wish	Golden Ticket	316,961
Rehragout-Rendezvous		308,343
Griechenland	Austria Ticket	283,783
Der Fuchs	Austria Ticket	114,627
Pulled Pork	Austria Ticket	105,622

== Notes ==
^{1} Certified in 2023.

== See also ==
- Cinema of Austria
- 2023 in Austria

Preceded by 2022	2023	Succeeded by 2024
