= List of 2026 box office number-one films in Austria =

This is a list of films which placed number one at the weekend box office for the year 2026.

== Number-one films ==
Week	Weekend End Date	Film	Total weekend gross (Euro)	Weekend openings in the Top 10	Ref.
1	January 4, 2026	Avatar: Fire and Ash	€1,340,000		
2	January 11, 2026	Avatar: Fire and Ash	€682,000	Checker Tobi 3 – Die heimliche Herrscherin der Erde (#3), Greenland 2: Migration (#4), Puritani MET Opera Live (#7), Rental Family (#10)	
3	January 18, 2026	Avatar: Fire and Ash	€521,000	The Housemaid (#2), Extrawurst (#5), 28 Years Later: The Bone Temple (#7)	

== Records ==
=== Biggest opening weekends ===
Rank	Title	Distributor	Opening Weekend
1	The Housemaid	Lionsgate Films	€440,000
2	Checker Tobi 3 – Die heimliche Herrscherin der Erde	MFA+ FilmDistribution	€155,000
3	Extrawurst	StudioCanal	€147,000
4	Greenland 2: Migration	Lionsgate Films	€111,000
5	Puritani MET Opera Live	Leonine Distribution	€72,600

=== Biggest opening and regular weekends ===
Rank	Title	Distributor	Weekend gross
1	Avatar: Fire and Ash	Disney	€1,340,000
2	Avatar: Fire and Ash	Disney	€682,000
3	Avatar: Fire and Ash	Disney	€521,000
4	The Housemaid	Lionsgate Films	€440,000
5	Zootopia 2	Disney	€408,000

== See also ==
- Cinema of Austria
- 2026 in Austria

Preceded by 2025	Box office number-one films 2026	Succeeded by 2027
