= Modul University Vienna =

Private university in Vienna, Austria

- Logo of MUV
- Motto: Vienna's Leading International University • Be There, Inspire. Educate. Grow. • The time of your life. For the future you deserve.
- Type: Private University
- Established: 2007
- Rector: Prof. Dr. Karl Wöber
- Administrative staff: 100
- Students: 900
- Location: Vienna, Austria; 48°16′29″N 16°20′8.7″E
- Campus: suburban
- Language: English
- Website: www.modul.ac.at

Modul University Vienna (MU Vienna) is a private university established in 2007 in Vienna, Austria, that focuses on social and economic development. In particular, it focuses on the areas of tourism, new media information technology, sustainability, business management, and public governance.

== History ==
=== Foundation and vision ===
MU Vienna was founded by the Vienna Chamber of Commerce and Industry and the Saudi-Austrian businessman Mohamed Bin Issa Al Jaber, and built with the support of the City of Vienna and the Vienna Tourist Board. The founders aimed to offer students internationally-oriented, hands-on studies in the areas of tourism research, information technology, and public administration by making use of the active role of Vienna in European city tourism. Karl Wöber, who had previously taught at the Vienna University of Economics and Business in the field of tourism, was appointed founding president.

The university was conceived and named Modul University Vienna by employees of the Modul Tourism College, a tertiary education school for hotel management and gastronomy also founded by the Vienna Chamber of Commerce and Industry in 1908.

The name Modul comes from the honeycomb structure of the Modul Tourism College, in which both the school and the adjacent hotel of the same name consist of octagonal, connected modules. The school and hotel are located in the 19th district (Döbling) and were designed and built between 1973 and 1975. Attending the Modul Tourism College is not a prerequisite for admission to MU Vienna.

In 2012, the Vienna Chamber of Commerce and Industry assumed sole ownership of MU Vienna. Within the first ten years, the university accredited three bachelor's degrees and four master's programs, and in 2012, a PhD program was also accredited.

Since January 2013, MU Vienna has been a member of the European Universities Consortium (EUC), a group of higher education institutions that promotes English-taught bachelor's programs in Europe. MU Vienna has both an international focus on teaching and research and is internationally located campuses. Study programs have been offered in Vienna, and in Nanjing (PR China) since 2017.

MU Vienna bases its research priorities on the principles of sustainability, economics, and innovation. The foreground maintains the overriding goal of creating benefits for society.The scientific disciplines represented at MU Vienna are guided by these principles, which are also included as integral components in the university’s study programs.

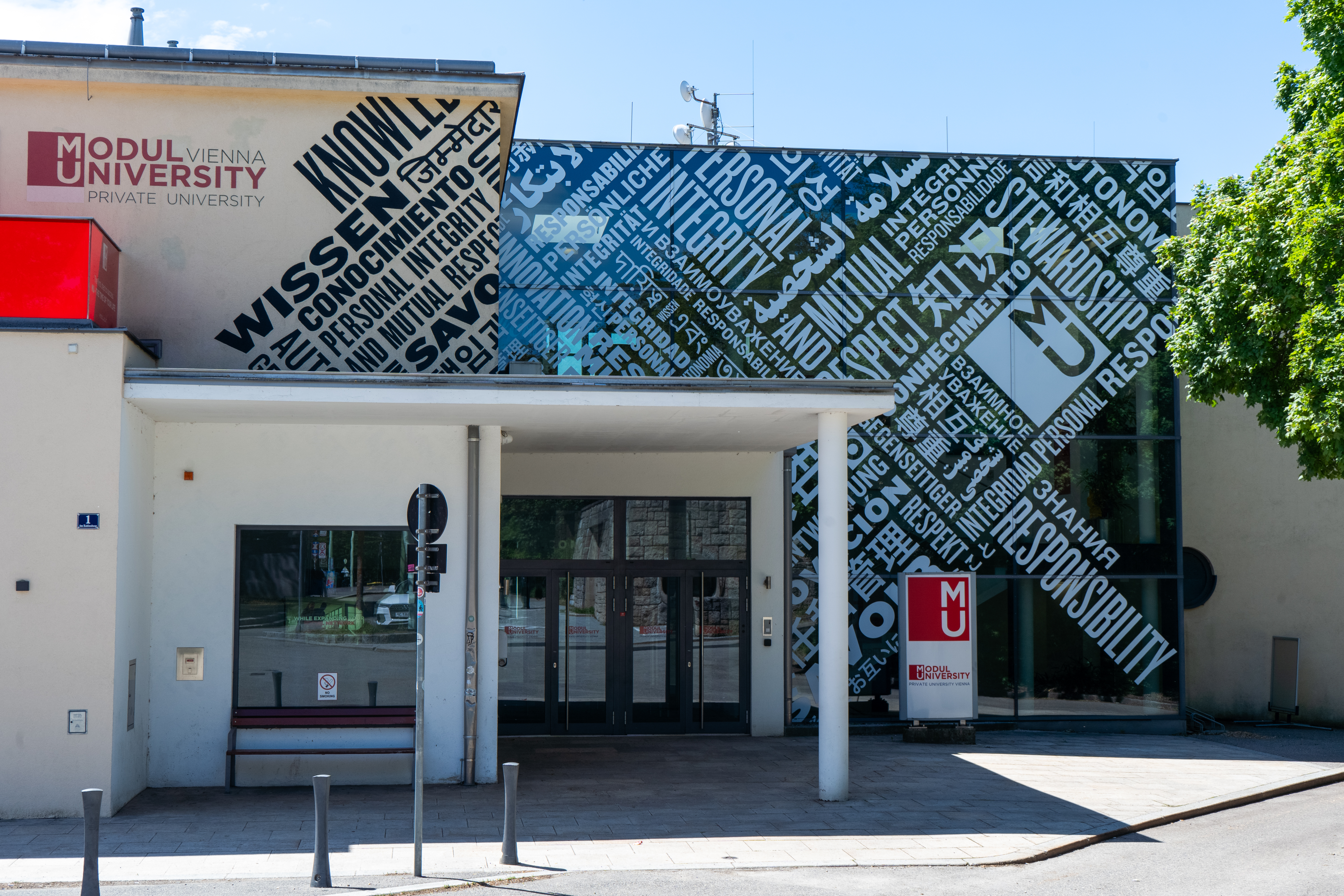
Entrance of Modul University Vienna

The university offers an integrated academic education, “an interweaving of decision-making competencies, based on a combination of methodical problem-solving and social learning”. The inclusionand promotion of the following educational values was decided by the University Senate on 16 January 2012:

- Knowledge, creativity and innovation: “Challenge what society takes for granted and embrace change”
- Personal integrity: “Support the principles of equality and justice”
- Mutual respect: “Value diversity and humanity”
- Responsibility and stewardship: “Serve as ambassadors of sustainable and responsible living”.

These values are displayed on the façade of the university building in the world’s 12 most frequently spoken languages.

In 2015, MU Vienna founded Modul University Technology GmbH, a research and development spin-off with focus on multimedia applications, interactive TV, and automated knowledge extraction processes.

In 2020, the Vienna Chamber of Commerce and Industry sold 90 per cent of its shares in MU Vienna to the British entrepreneur Suresh Sivagnanam (*1970), founder of doc, an online medical advice and care platform.

=== Accreditation ===
The Austrian Accreditation Council accredited MU Vienna on July 39, 2007, and the university started operating in September–November 2007. In 2014, the Agency for Quality Assurance and Accreditation Austria reaccredited MU Vienna. The Agency for Quality Assurance and Accreditation Austria was founded on March 1, 2011, based on the University Quality Assurance Act (HS-QSG) as part of a fundamental redesign of Austria’s system of external quality assurance.

Since 2012, MU Vienna’s tourism study programs have been certified under the United Nations World Tourism Organization (UNWTO)’s TedQual scheme.

=== Sustainability ===
Sustainability is an essential component of MU Vienna’s educational content and research agenda. The university has also implemented several measures in its day-to-day operations to minimize impacts on the environment. These include a solar energy system, a pellet heating system, and a waste management system, as well as measures to promote a sustainable way of thinking and living among its students and staff. A Sustainability Committee, appointed by the University Senate, aims to promote sustainability by communicating regularly with students, staff, suppliers, and partners about its goals and activities .

== University bodies ==
As laid down in the University's Constitution, Modul University is governed by three main bodies: The University Council, The University Senate and the University Board. The university is managed by a collegial body consisting of the rector, the vice-rector, and the managing director. The University Council is the strategic steering body of Modul University Vienna and consists of four representatives of the owners, two representatives of the industry, and two representatives of other universities. The University Senate consists of 20 members and facilitates the academic self-governance of MUV. The University is managed by the University Board, consisting of the President, the Executive Vice-President, and the University Director.

== Academic Departments & Schools ==
Modul University Vienna consists of five scientific departments (schools) and two research institutes:

- School of Sustainability, Governance, and Methods (Head: Prof. Sabine Sedlacek)
- School of Tourism and Service Management (Head: Prof. Astrid Dickinger)
- School of International Management (Head: Prof. Horst Treiblmaier)
- School of International Relations (Head: Prof. Doug Stokes)
- School of Applied Data Science (Head: Prof. Ingo Frommholz)
- Research Institute for New Media Technology (Head: Prof. Arno Scharl)
- Vienna Institute for Global Studies (VIGS, Head: Prof. Dr. Zoltan Acs)

The Vienna Institute for Global Studies (VIGS) is a research institute at Modul University Vienna, established in 2024 by Professor Dr. Zoltan Acs. It operates as an independent center with research areas including entrepreneurial ecosystems, international relations and geopolitics, and well-being and health. In addition to academic research, the institute recently introduced the Digital Entrepreneurship Ecosystem (DEE) Index and published the first report focusing on the Danube Region.

== Study programs ==
Modul University Vienna offers Foundation, BA, BBA, BSc, CE, MSc, MBA, and PhD study programs in the fields of business, data science, tourism, international relations and sustainability. All study programs are offered exclusively in English. In addition to the core subjects, specializations and elective subjects provide the opportunity to specialize in different areas of expertise. The range of offered courses includes the following study programs:

Foundation Programs

- Foundation Program Business
- Foundation Program Tech

Bachelor Programs

- BA in International Relations and Sustainability
- BBA in Tourism, Hotel Management and Operations
- BBA in Tourism, Hotel Management and Operations – New York Extension
- BBA in Tourism and Hospitality Management
- BBA / BSc in Tourism and Hospitality Management – 2+2 year Mobility Agreement with the Hong Kong Polytechnic University
- BSc in Human Resources Management - Newly Accredited
- BSc in International Management
- BSc in International Management with Professional Experience
- BSc in Applied Data Science

Both Bachelor of Science in International Management programs offer the following specializations: Entrepreneurship and Leadership, International Marketing, and International Management.

The Bachelor of Business Administration offers the following specializations: Tourism and Event Management, and Hotel Management.

Master Programs

- MSc in Management
- MSc in International Tourism Management
- MSc in Sustainable Development, Management and Policy
- MSc in Data Science for Sustainability

All Master of Science programs offer the following specializations: Digital Marketing, Entrepreneurship, Innovation and Leadership, Innovation and Experience Design for Tourism, Real Estate Management, Sustainable Management and Policy, and Tourism and Services Management.

- Master of Business Administration (MBA)

The Master of Business Administration offers the following specializations: Digital Marketing, Entrepreneurship, Innovation and Leadership, Innovation and Experience Design for Tourism, Real Estate Management, and Sustainable Management and Policy.

PHD Programs

- Doctor of Philosophy (PhD) in Business and Socioeconomic Sciences

At the Nanjing campus:

- Bachelor of Business Administration (BBA) in Tourism and Hospitality Management.

All study programs are offered exclusively in English. Modul University Vienna maintains exchange programs for its students with 21 partner universities worldwide.

== Research ==
Modul University Vienna is characterized by a high level of commitment to basic and applied research. The research topics are in the fields of economics, social sciences, and information science and deal with both current and future-oriented research questions. The research-led teaching approach of Modul University Vienna is reflected in the discussion of current research projects in teaching and the active involvement of students in research projects. In addition, Modul University Vienna is dedicated to supporting young researchers, especially since the accreditation of the doctoral program in business and socioeconomic sciences in 2012. From 2007 to 2017, the Modul University Vienna faculty has published 670 scientific articles and 600 conference contributions, as well as completed 68 national and international research projects.

In 2015, Modul University Vienna founded Modul University Technology GmbH, an R&D spin-off with a research focus on multimedia applications, interactive TV, and automated knowledge extraction processes.

Research focus of the faculty:

- Analysis of large amounts of data (Big Data), knowledge extraction, and information diffusion
- Environmental communication with a focus on climate change
- Energy financing and system prices
- Digital Marketing
- Sustainable finances, fund management, and asset pricing
- Impact of blockchain / distributed ledger technology
- Sustainable tourism and regional development policy
- Governance for innovation and sustainable development
- Education for sustainable development
- Measuring living conditions and quality of life
- Degrowth
- Methods for analyzing empirical data
- Analysis of travel flows and leisure behaviour
- Development and evaluation of information and decision support systems
- Innovation and Design Thinking
- Market research and analysis of consumer behaviour

Third party funded research projects (selection)
Acronym	Period	Objective	Funding organization	Consortium
RAVEN	2008-2010	Relation Analysis and Visualization for Evolving Networks.	FFG	Modul University Vienna (AT), Vienna University of Economics and Business (AT), Know-Center (AT), SmApper Technologies, Gentics Software (AT)
DecarboNet	2013-2017	To investigate the potential of social platforms in mitigating climate change.	CAPS (Collective Awareness Platforms for Sustainability & Social Innovation), European Union, 7th FP and Horizon 2020	Modul University Vienna (AT), KMI - The Open University (UK), University of Sheffield (UK), WWF Switzerland (CH), Vienna University of Economics and Business (AT), Waag Society, Green Energy Options
PHEME	2014-2017	Pheme builds technology for finding how true claims made online are.	European Union, 7th FP	University of Sheffield (UK), Universität des Saarlandes (DE), Modul University Vienna (AT), Ontotext (BU), ATOS Spain SA (ES), King's College London (UK), iHub Ltd., SwissInfo.ch (CH), University of Warwick (UK)
Investment Funds for Technology-Based Start-Ups in Vienna	2015-2016	In-depth analysis of the Vienna startup ecosystem.	Vienna Chamber of Commerce and Industry	Modul University Vienna (AT)
VorTEIL – Vorzeigeregion Tourismus	2016-2017	The aim of the “VorTEIL – Energy Flagship Tourism Region” project is to identify potential synergies along the value chain and among relevant stakeholders and to demonstrate that sustainable and resource-efficient technologies can fulfil the requirements of tourism infrastructure.	Klima- und Energiefonds – Energieforschungsprogramm	Austrian Institute of Technology GmbH (AT), Modul University Vienna (AT), mitPlan GmbH (AT)
InVID	2016-2018	Verification of Social Media Video Content for the News Industry.	Horizon 2020	CERTH, Modul Technology GmbH (AT), Universitat de Lleida (UdL), EXO MAKINA (FR), WebLyzard Technology GmbH (AT), Condat AG (DE), APA-IT (AT), Agence France-Presse (FR), Deutsche Welle (DE)
TRIANGLE - The Tourism Research, Innovation and Next Generation Learning Experience	2016-2019	Creating a Knowledge Alliance of HEIs and businesses across Europe, delivering a common sustainable tourism training system for protected area and green tourism destinations.	Erasmus+	Algarve University (ES), Eberswalde University (DE), Modul University Vienna (AT), Paris 1 Panthéon-Sorbonne University (FR)
SCITHOS - Smart City Hospitality	2016-2019	SCITHOS introduces the Smart City Hospitality concept, consisting of guidelines and tools, that can support cities to make the transition towards environmentally and socially responsible tourism that simultaneously contributes to long-term (economic) prosperity.	European Union, FFG, ERA-Net	NHTV Breda University of Applied Sciences (NL), West Norway Research Institute (NO), Worldline Iberia SA (ES), Modul University Vienna (AT)
INCLUDE - Indigenous Communities Land Use and Tropical Deforestation	2016-2021	The problem of deforestation in the Argentinean dry Chaco in the province of Salta (the Chaco Saltenho).	European Research Council (ERC) Consolidator Grant Scheme	University of Bern (CH), University of Reading (UK), Modul University Vienna (AT)
APCC Special Report on Tourism, large Culture, Sports Events and Climate change	2018-2020	The purpose of the Special Report is to summarize and assess the state of knowledge of all aspects of this topic based on and open to contributions by the full community of Austrian researchers and related experts.	Klima- und Energiefonds, ACRP	University of Natural Resources and Life Sciences Vienna (AT), Zentralanstalt für Meteorologie und Geodynamik (AT), Joanneum Research (AT)
ECOMOVE	2018-2020	Knowledge-based platform for predicting mobility bottlenecks and promoting sustainable changes in behaviour.	FFG	Modul University Vienna (AT), nast consulting ZT GmbH (AT), Unwired Networks GmbH
Carrying capacity methodology for tourism	2019-2020	To determine the carrying capacity in regions dominated by tourism.	ESPON EGTC	ÖIR GmbH (AT), Modul University Vienna (AT), University of Ljubljana (SI), alohas (SI)
Qualification-Network “Smart Data Analytics für die Hotellerie”	2019-2020	The aim of the qualification network is to provide the employees of the participating companies with innovative methods for dealing with internal and external data and thus to create skills for the digital transformation.	FFG	Technical University Vienna (AT) and 17 other organizations
i-conn Interdisciplinary connectivity	2019-2023	Understanding and managing complex systems using connectivity.	Horizon 2020	University of Durham (UK), Modul University Vienna (AT), Jacobs University Bremen (DE), AAI (CY), European University Cyprus (CY), University of Vienna (AT), University of Natural Resources and Life Sciences Vienna (AT), Environment Agency (UK), Masarykova University (CZ), Universitie d’Aix-Marseille (FR)

== Awards and rankings ==
The university has repeatedly been recognized for its research achievements and its focus on sustainability. In 2018 and 2020, Modul University Vienna was ranked among the top 25 universities in the world in the U-Multirank University Ranking in the category "most frequently cited publications". In 2012, Modul University Vienna received the Austrian National Award for Sustainability for its project "Promotion of Sustainable Stakeholder Initiatives" in the field of structural anchoring. In 2016, Modul University Vienna followed up with two awards for its work in the field of education on sustainability: second place for the project "SusToGo - Sustainability to go" in the category "Student Initiatives" and for the project "DecarboNet" in the category "Communication and Decision Making".

== Partners ==
MU Vienna maintains several co-operations with academic and industry partners, as well as organizations around the world. Modul University Vienna maintains study exchange agreements with the following partner institutions:

Asia

Boğaziçi University (Turkey), Hong Kong Polytechnic University (Hong Kong SAR), Taylor's University (Malaysia), City University of Macau (Macau SAR)

Modul University is the first international partner of AdmitAll, a Philippine-based education technology company.

Europe

Dublin Institute of Technology (Ireland), NHTV Breda University of Applied Sciences (The Netherlands), University of Southern Denmark (Denmark), University of Surrey (UK), La Rochelle Business School (France), Ramon Llull University (Spain), Cologne Business School (Germany), University of Barcelona (Spain), University of West London (UK), University of Surrey (UK), ISAG – European Business School (Portugal).

North and South America

San Francisco State University (USA), Temple University (USA), Virginia Tech (USA), Universidad Anáhuac Mayab (Mexico), University of Central Florida (USA), University of Florida (USA), UIDE Universidad Internacional del Ecuador (Ecuador)

== Campus life ==
Modul University Vienna is situated on Kahlenberg, a mountain (484 m or 1,588 ft) located in the 19th district of Vienna, Austria (Döbling). Kahlenberg lies in the Wienerwald (Vienna forest) and is one of the most popular destinations for day trips from Vienna, offering a view over the entire city. Student accommodation arranged by MU Vienna is available in the 19th and 20th districts of Vienna. Many students live in other parts of Vienna or their home cities and countries and commute to the campus. Kahlenberg can be reached by car or by bus (Bus line 38A) via the Höhenstraße, part of which is cobblestone.

=== Extracurricular activities ===
By the fundamental educational values of the university, Modul University Vienna has created the MU Cares Intercultural Certificate Program to encourage students to work for society alongside their studies. The university offers students the opportunity to participate in charitable and social events at the university or on their initiative off campus. It encourages and supports its students in their search for intercultural experience and social work. Upon completion of their studies at Modul University Vienna, students who can demonstrate extracurricular activities in line with MU Care's vision receive a certificate from the university as a supplement to their diploma. In addition to this program, various student groups such as the Hotel Club, the Football Club, the Entrepreneurs Club, or the Movie Club contribute to student life. Every year, the university organizes an International Day, a public event at the university where students present their countries and their cultural background. The net proceeds of this event are donated to a charitable cause.

== Supporting Services ==
Modul University Vienna provides academic services, mentoring services, a buddy program, a peer tutoring program, career services, and professional counseling.

=== Career Support ===
Career support is a joint effort between many departments. Students can benefit from tailored guidance on CV and motivation letter writing, one-on-one career advisory sessions, and access to internship opportunities at MU’s corporate partners.

=== Buddy Program ===
The Buddy Program is a volunteer initiative designed to support the onboarding & integration of newly admitted international and exchange students into university life and the city of Vienna. The program pairs new students with current MU students ("buddies") who provide guidance and support during the initial months of adjustment. Participants form friendships, develop cross-cultural understanding, and take part in dedicated events aimed at strengthening student networks.

=== Student Clubs ===
At Modul University Vienna supports a variety of student-led clubs and organizations. These clubs provide opportunities for students to pursue personal interests, develop new skills, and engage with peers outside of their academic programs. A list of all current active clubs can be found on the MU website.

=== Onboarding Support ===
MU Provides student visa application and housing support services. Students can choose from a variety of housing providers located throughout the city, catering to all budgets and needs.

== Awards ==
=== Honorary senators ===
- Brigitte Jank (* 1951), As founding chairperson of the University Council, she supported the development of the university and promoted the vision of a holistic, value-oriented education.
- Mohamed Bin Issa Al Jaber (* 1959), sponsor of Modul University Vienna, who awarded scholarships to numerous students during the founding phase.

=== Ring bearers ===
- Erich Auerbäck (* 1947), chairman of the project team responsible for the planning and founding of the university in 2007.
