= List of 2021 box office number-one films in Austria =

This is a list of films which placed number one at the weekend box office for the year 2021.

== Number-one films ==
†	This implies the highest-grossing movie of the year.

#	Date	Film	Admission	Total weekend gross (Euro)	Notes
1–20	3 January 2021 – 16 May 2021	For these weekends box office reporting was suspended due to the COVID-19 pandemic.			
21	May 23, 2021	Raya and the Last Dragon		€28,000	
22	May 30, 2021	Nomadland	6,000	€53,000	
23	June 6, 2021	Nomadland	3,425	€30,000	
24	June 13, 2021	Nomadland		€21,000	
25	June 20, 2021	A Quiet Place Part II		€66,000	
26	June 27, 2021	A Quiet Place Part II		€55,000	
27	July 4, 2021	The Conjuring: The Devil Made Me Do It		€203,539	
28	July 11, 2021	Black Widow		€395,926	
29	July 18, 2021	F9		€850,000	
23	July 25, 2021	F9	31,974	€380,000	
23	August 1, 2021	F9	22,618 (196.790 in total)	€260,000	
24	August 8, 2021	Kaiserschmarrndrama	41,297	€397,000	
25	August 15, 2021	Kaiserschmarrndrama	18,527	€180,000	
26	August 22, 2021	PAW Patrol: The Movie	23,257	€179,000	
27	August 29, 2021	PAW Patrol: The Movie	29,499	€227,000	
28	September 5, 2021	Shang-Chi and the Legend of the Ten Rings		€251,000	
29	September 12, 2021	Shang-Chi and the Legend of the Ten Rings	16,870	€215,000	
30	September 19, 2021	Dune	32,416	€412,916	
31	September 26, 2021	Dune	20,975	€270,000	
32	October 3, 2021	No Time to Die †	105,556	€1,360,000	
33	October 10, 2021	No Time to Die †	95,652	€1,200,000	
34	October 17, 2021	No Time to Die †	61,676	€789,000	
35	October 24, 2021	No Time to Die †	39.441	€485,000	
36	October 31, 2021	No Time to Die †	28,427	€353,000	
37	November 7, 2021	Eternals	28,834	€400,000	
38	November 14, 2021	Eternals	14,767	€202,000	
39	November 21, 2021	Ghostbusters: Afterlife	11,626	€129,000	
40–42	28 November 2021 – 12 December 2021	For these weekends box office reporting was suspended due to the COVID-19 pandemic.			
43	December 19, 2021	Spider-Man: No Way Home	110,515	€1,440,000	
44	December 26, 2021	Spider-Man: No Way Home		€585,000	

== Records ==
=== Highest-grossing films ===
Rank	Title	Domestic gross	Country
1.	No Time to Die	€7,100,000	United Kingdom, United States
2.	Spider-Man: No Way Home	€2,800,000	United States
3.	F9	€2,700,000	United Kingdom, United States, China
4.	Dune	€2,150,000	United States
5.	Kaiserschmarrndrama	€1,960,000	Germany

=== Biggest opening weekends ===
Rank	Title	Distributor	Opening Weekend
1	Spider-Man: No Way Home	Sony	€1,440,000
2	No Time to Die	Universal	€1,360,000
3	F9	Universal	€850,000
4	Venom: Let There Be Carnage	Sony	€434,000
5	Dune	Warner Bros	€412,916

=== Certifications ===
Golden Ticket indicates that the film sold more than 300,000 tickets in a given calendar year. Austria Ticket is awarded to Austrian film productions with over 75,000 admissions.

Title	Certification	Admissions
No Time to Die	Golden Ticket	583,613
Spider-Man: No Way Home	Golden Ticket	347,946
Die Schule der magischen Tiere	Austria Ticket	130,986

== See also ==
- Cinema of Austria

Preceded by 2020	2021	Succeeded by 2022
