= Grand Hotel Wien =

Hotel in Vienna, Austria

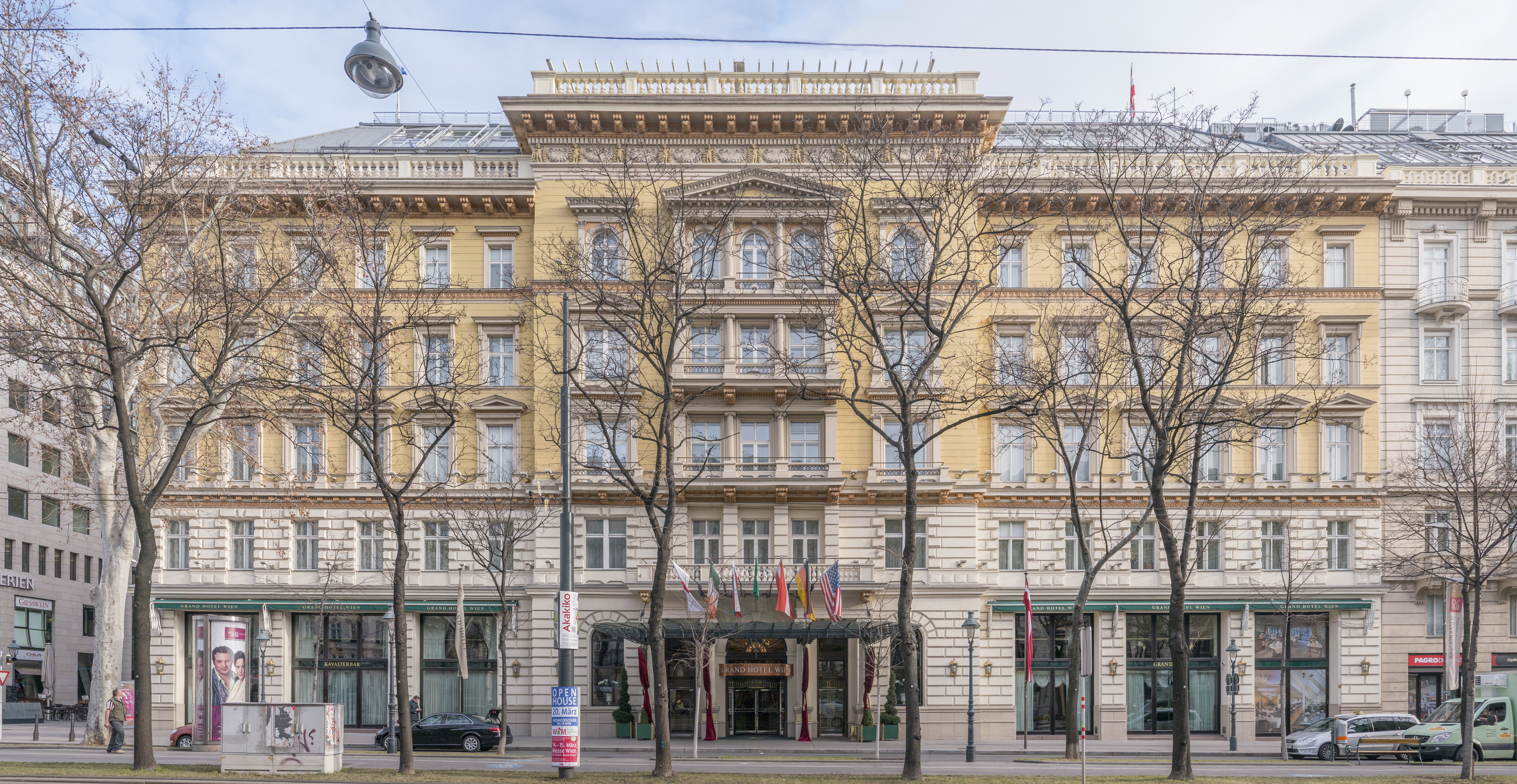
- Interactive map of the Grand Hotel Wien area

General information
- Location: Ringstraße, Vienna, Austria
- Coordinates: 48°12′7.9″N 16°22′19.7″E
- Opened: 1870
- Owner: JJW Hotels & Resorts
- Operator: JJW Hotels & Resorts
- Affiliation: IHG Hotels & Resorts

Technical details
- Floor count: 5

Design and construction
- Developer: Heinrich Adam

Other information
- Number of rooms: 205
- Number of suites: 30
- Number of restaurants: 3

Website
- www.grandhotelwien.com

The Grand Hotel Wien is a five-star luxury hotel in Vienna, Austria. It is located on the Ringstraße at Kärntner Ring 9.

== History ==
The hotel has a long history and tradition. The architect was Carl Tietz, and it was opened as the first Viennese luxury hotel in 1870. It originally had over 300 rooms, 200 bathrooms, a steam-powered elevator, and a telegraph office.

The hotel became an instant hit with the aristocracy and became a popular meeting place, since it was centrally located for the Korso restaurant. In 1894, the waltz king Johann Strauß II celebrated his 50-year stage anniversary at the hotel. In 1911, the hotel was extended into the neighbouring buildings at Kärntner Ring 11 and 13. Also, all rooms had their own telephones installed.

After World War II, the hotel housed Soviet troops from 1945 to 1955. The hotel reopened for regular business in 1958, but was sold to the Austrian government. The government rented the building to the International Atomic Energy Agency (IAEA), which located its headquarters there until 1979, when IAEA moved to the Vienna International Centre.

Ten years later, All Nippon Airways purchased the hotel and began an ambitious reconstruction. The hotel was reduced to its original size and completely refurbished and renovated. The historical façade by Tietz was restored, while the interior was modernized. The hotel was renamed "ANA Grand Hotel" and reopened in 1994. ANA sold the hotel in 2002 to the JJW Hotels & Resorts group, and the name reverted to "Grand Hotel Wien".

In June 2025 bankruptcy proceedings were opened for the hotel at the request of creditors. In December 2025 its Austrian-Saudi owner proceeded in court to halt sales negotiations.
