= AdmitAll =

Web service for education services

Admitall
- Available in: English
- Key people: Christian Schweigler, CEO
- Website: admitall.com
- Current status: Active

Admitall (stylized as AdmitAll), is a web service for education services based in Quezon City, Philippines. It is a digital platform owned and operated by BTGWorld Corporation. It has partnership with colleges and universities in Australia, Austria, United Arab Emirates, and the Philippines. The technology spawned from a team thesis by masteral students at Bentley University and Harvard University and applied as a social enterprise for education. The website onboard students in the system and links them with its partner colleges and best universities around the world. It owns the SmartID, a school identification card linked to its system. The SmartID is an automated teller machine linked with EON electronic banking of Union Bank of the Philippines. To access the platform, its partner colleges and universities are provided with dashboard to connect to the system.

== History ==
In November 2017, the AdmitAll website was launched and went live, facilitating the onboarding of students and partner colleges and universities. This launch coincided with the introduction of its SmartID for students.

In December 2017, Balara High School was the first secondary school to get onboard on AdmitAll.

On February 21, 2018, AdmitAll participated in the 2nd EduTech Philippines trade exhibit as its first public engagement in education conference.

In March 2018, it signed its first partner college, the Manila and Quezon City campuses of La Consolacion College. The following month, it signed up the first international university partner Modul University of Vienna, Austria.

In August 2018, it signed up the first government institution in the Philippines, the National Youth Commission.

Its first major international civic club partner is the Junior Chamber International which signed up in August 2018.

== Partnerships ==
At present, AdmitAll has established a partnership with schools, colleges and universities in the Philippines and a university in Austria. It has also established a partnership with civic organizations such as Junior Chamber International and Boy Scouts of the Philippines for its SmartID.

Admitall has an ongoing negotiation with municipal and city governments on educational collaboration to develop a scholarship program.

== Headquarters ==
AdmitAll's main headquarters is in Quezon City - where the web server is located, while its call center operation is located in Taytay, Rizal. The Philippines also serves as the regional headquarters for the ASEAN region. There are contact centers in China and Austria.
