= Palais Gutmann =

Coordinates: 48.202139°N 16.376611°E

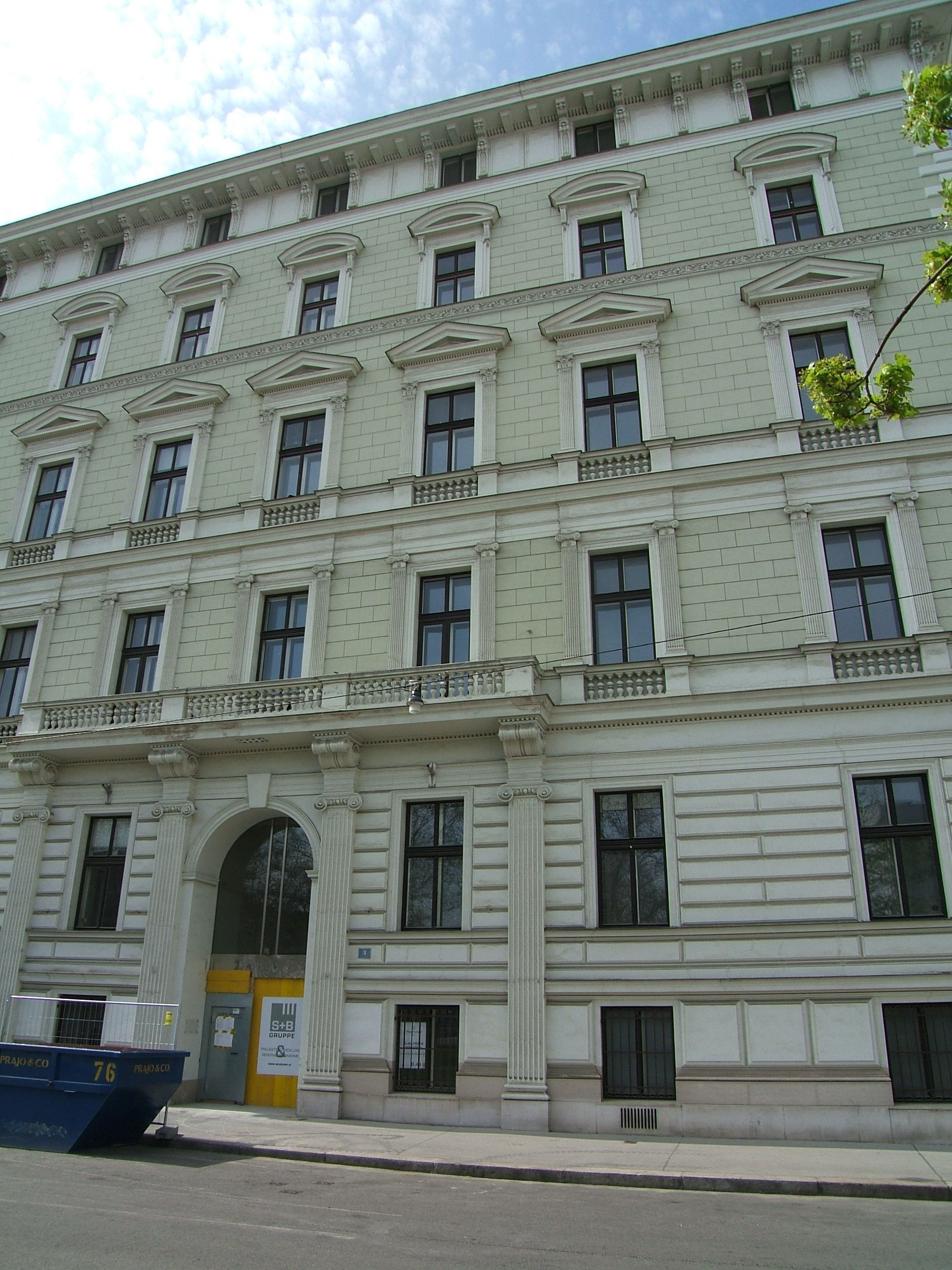
Palais Gutmann

Palais Gutmann is a Ringstraßenpalais in Vienna, Austria. It was built for the coal trading Gutmann family. It was built in 1869–1871. The architect was Carl Tietz.

== History ==
The "strictly historicist" palace was built in the years 1869-1871 by the architect Carl Tietz for the wealthy Jewish entrepreneurial Gutmann family in the New Viennese Renaissance style. After it was expropriated in 1938, the palace was used by the NSDAP from 1941 and Franz Klimscha was commissioned to redesign the building. Another redesign took place in the years 1956-1961 by Carl Kronfuss . The palace is now managed by Austria Immobilien GmbH (BAI) .
