= Carl Tietz =

German architect

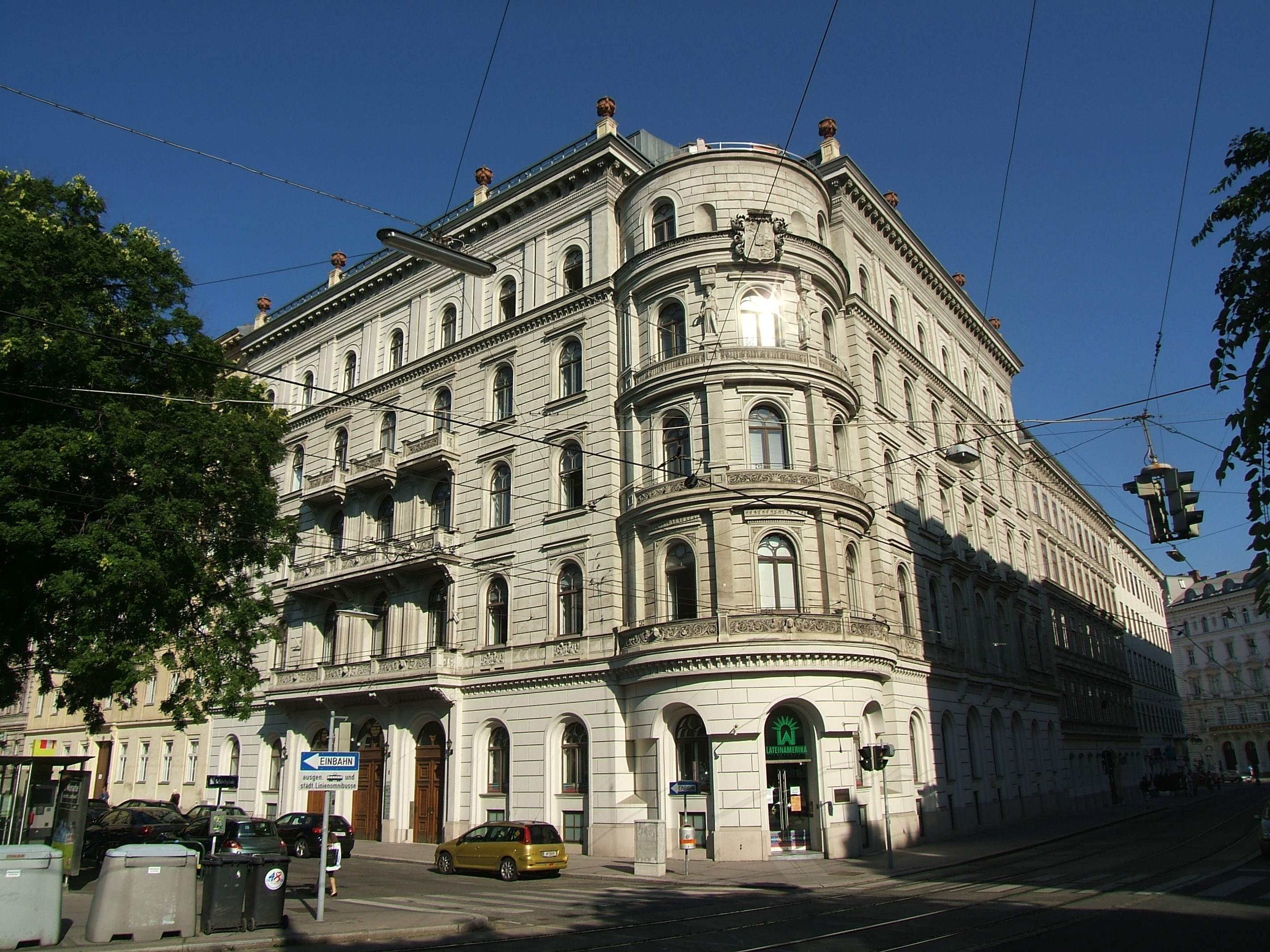
Palais Schlick (1856–1858)

Carl Tietz (25 January 1831 – 3 August 1874) was a German architect who practiced in Austria.

== Life and career ==
Tietz was born in Jastrow and came from a humble background. He completed an apprenticeship as a bricklayer and later worked as a construction inspector. In 1852, he passed the Master Craftsman examination. That same year, his employer sent him to manage construction of the Circus Renz building in Vienna, where he decided to remain and become an architect, although his plans to attend the Academy of Architecture in Berlin had to be abandoned.

Initially, he concentrated on contracts for industrial buildings, but soon developed connections with wealthy German immigrants who admired his classical, monumental style. He became involved in the Ringstraße project and eventually produced 36 luxurious buildings in its vicinity. By 1869, overwork began to have an effect on his health and he took several trips to Italy with his wife, but to no avail. In 1870, following the collapse of a wall at one of his buildings that killed eight people, he became mentally ill (or had a stroke; it's not clear which). He was placed in a private psychiatric clinic in Oberdöbling and died there, aged 43.

== Major buildings ==
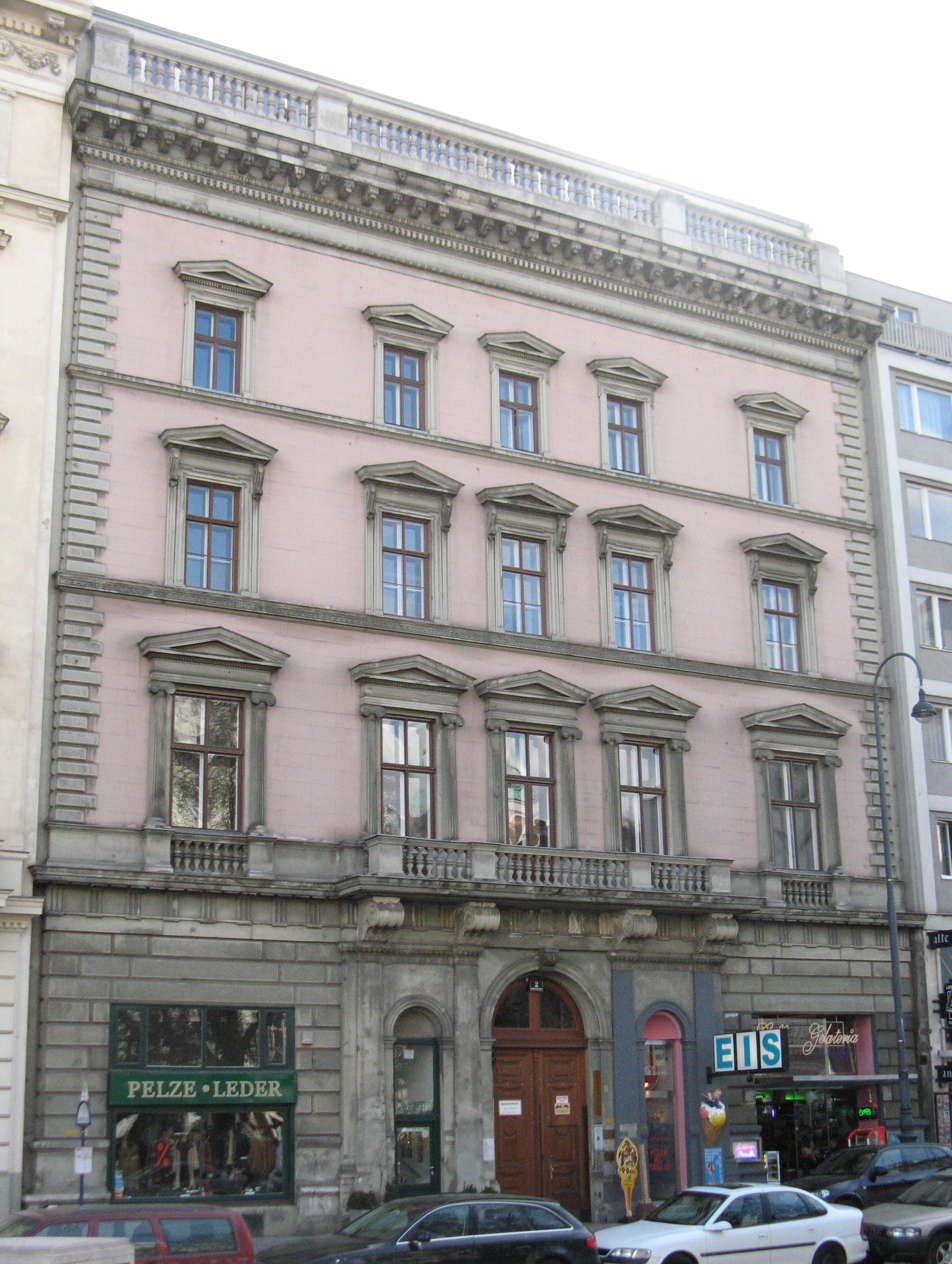
Palais Klein (1867)

- Circus Renz, Zirkusgasse, Wien 2 (1853–1854)
- Galvagnihof, Hoher Markt 10–11, Wien 1 (1854)
- Palais Schlick, Türkenstraße 25, Wien 9 (1856–1858)
- Grand Hotel, Kärntner Ring 9, Wien 1 (1861–1865)
- Werkstätten- und Kulturhaus, Währinger Straße 59, Wien 9 (1866)
- Palais Klein, Dr.-Karl-Lueger-Platz 2, Wien 1 (1867)
- Palais Gutmann, Kantgasse 6, Wien 1 (1871)
