= Kneissl =

Austrian company

Kneissl Holding GmbH
- Industry: Snowsports
- Founded: 1861
- Founder: Franz Kneißl
- Headquarters: Kufstein, Austria
- Key people: Andreas Gebauer; Mohamed bin Issa Al Jaber
- Products: Ski equipment, Tennis Racquets
- Number of employees: 28
- Website: www.kneissl.com

Kneissl is a manufacturer of handmade skis, biking and tennis equipment and apparel, based in Kufstein, Tyrol, Austria.

== History ==
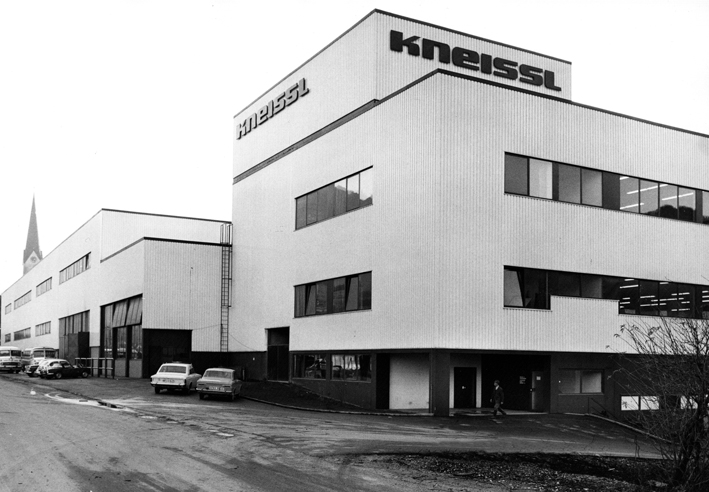
Kneissl factory in Kufstein, 1969

=== To 1990 ===
The Kneissl Company was founded as a wheel factory in 1861. The first skis were produced in 1919. In the 1960s, Kneissl developed the first plastic skis featuring a wood core. Ski racer Karl Schranz made the Kneissl White Star skis one of the most sought after in the world. In the seventies, the company expanded into cross-country ski and tennis racquet production.

In 1980, Kneissl went bankrupt and was bought out by German cross-country ski manufacturer Trak, as sole owner. In 1983, U.S. company Tristar took over Kneissl.

In February 1989, BREG Gesellschaft für Bau und Revitalisierung, belonging to Hans Peter Haselsteiner and Erhard Grossnigg and Reinfried Spazier, took a majority stake.

=== In the nineties ===
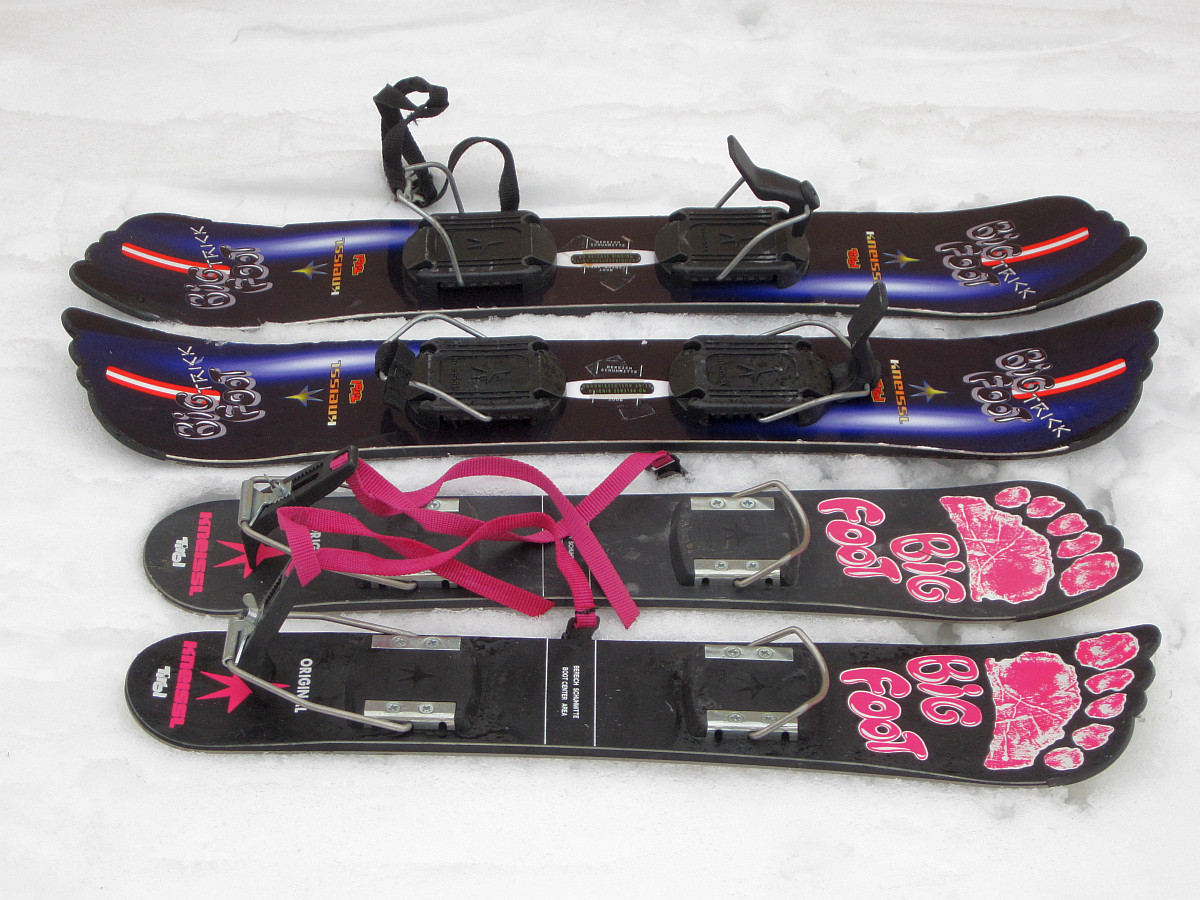
Kneissl Bigfoot skiboards

Kneissl was credited with the invention of “big foot” skis in 1990. It was also the first company to sell a carving ski in Austria. Several different versions and styles of the "Big Foot" were made

In 1992, Kneissl and Dachstein were merged into Molln-based Kneissl Dachstein Sportartikel AG. In fiscal year 1993/1994, the company, employing 320 people, achieved revenues of 627 million Schilling. However, in 2003, Kneissl became insolvent for the second time. In 1995, Kneissl joined with Switzerland Raichle and integrated the Dynafit, Dee Luxe and Marker brands.

In 1998, the company was renamed Kneissl & Friends. In 1999, production was stopped at Molln and headquarters moved back to Kufstein. Two production sites were opened in Hungary.

=== In the early and mid-2000s ===
In September 2002, the expansion strategy had failed. Ski production in Kufstein had to be adjusted, and part of it taken up by Fischer. Raichl was sold to Mammut AG in January 2003 and three months later, Kneissl applied for insolvency. It was bought by a consortium, which saw its members step down one by one.

In 2006, production was terminated in Kufstein and moved to the Czech Republic and Carinthia or contracted out to Fischer.

=== New orientation since 2008 ===
In 2008, Sheikh Mohamed Bin Issa Al Jaber took a controlling stake in Kneissl through his JJW Hotels & Resorts group. New orientation was the opening of up to 70 Kneissl Star Lounges worldwide – a concept mixing shopping and catering in a same place – as well as several Kneissl Star Resort Hotels.

The first Kneissl Star Lounge opened in the city center of Innsbruck in 2009. Another built in Hochfügen has never been occupied. Establishment of the Kneissl Hotel project was postponed several times. Plans to build a ski factory in Kiefersfelden were discarded.

After Mohamed Bin Issa Al Jaber had delayed a €1,2 million investment, former shareholder Fritz Unterberger requested (January 3, 2011) that bankruptcy proceedings be initiated for Kneissl. He was owed about 900.000 euros. Other litigation erupted with fashion label Susan Strasser and football club FC Wacker Innsbruck.

Despite ongoing reports on financial difficulties, the CEO stood by the 25 million euros hotel project in Stockenboi. As Sheikh Al Jaber again postponed the investment, resumption of negotiations on bankruptcy were necessary. Andreas Gebauer was called upon to prove Kneissl's solvency in Innsbruck regional court.

=== 2011 bankruptcy ===
On the 8th of February 2011, Andreas Gebauer applied for insolvency for Kneissl Holding GmbH, Kneissl Tirol GmbH and Kneissl Star Lounge GmbH. In his initial statement, Gebauer spoke of a legal claim against Sheikh Al Jaber, for not respecting his capital injection engagements, he was responsible of the situation. Al Jaber repeated his will not to abandon Kneissl, and offered support to a redevelopment plan. Creditor Susan Strasser GmbH filed complaint for grossly neglection of creditors interest, opposition to insolvency application and fraudulent bankruptcy. Related investigations started in February 2011 and were later expanded to JJW.

In June 2011, a negotiated redevelopment plan was thwarted by Al Jaber failing to pay €2,1 million. In July, ski production in Kufstein was terminated. In October 2011, the liquidator lawyer Stefan Geiler chose to sell Kneissl to Friends of Sports. However, Friends of Sport delayed the payment Eventually, sheikh Al Jaber bade €1.98 million and took back control of the company, offering creditors a 20% rate. Al Jaber's company JJA Beteiligungsverwaltungs GmbH became the sole stakeholder.

== Organization ==
Andreas Gebauer has been CEO since 2007, Andrea King vice-CEO since January 2011.

Holding company Kneissl Holding GmbH controls 100% of Kneissl Holding GmbH, Kneissl Star Lounge GmbH and Kneissl Star Resort AG.
