= List of 2020 box office number-one films in Austria =

This is a list of films which placed number one at the weekend box office for the year 2020.

== Number-one films ==
†	This implies the highest-grossing movie of the year.

#	Date	Film	Admissions	Total weekend gross	Notes
1	January 5, 2020	Star Wars: The Rise of Skywalker		€504,167	
2	January 12, 2020	Knives Out		€212,000	
3	January 19, 2020	Bad Boys for Life †		€503,000	
4	January 26, 2020	Bad Boys for Life †		€372,000	
5	February 2, 2020	Dolittle		€327,000	
6	February 9, 2020	Dolittle		€236,000	
7	February 16, 2020	Sonic the Hedgehog		€345,000	
8	February 23, 2020	Sonic the Hedgehog		€267,000	
9	March 1, 2020	Sonic the Hedgehog		€207,728	
10	March 8, 2020	Bloodshot		€154,000	
11	March 15, 2020	My Spy		€6,283^{[a]}	
12–28	22 March 2020 – 12 July 2020	For these weekends box office reporting was suspended due to the COVID-19 pandemic.			
29	July 19, 2020	Scoob!		€34,000	
30	July 26, 2020	Scoob!	2,364 viewers	€20,000	
31	August 2, 2020	Scoob!		€10,000	
32	August 9, 2020	Unhinged		€33,916	
33	August 16, 2020	I Still Believe		€64,404	
34	August 23, 2020	I Still Believe		€39,550	
35	August 30, 2020	Tenet		€409,043	
36	September 6, 2020	Tenet		€250,000	
37	September 13, 2020	Tenet		€129,000	
38	September 20, 2020	Tenet		€94,000	
39	September 27, 2020	Tenet		€107,000	
40	October 4, 2020	Tenet		€73,000	
41	October 11, 2020	Es ist zu deinem Besten		€90,000	
42	October 18, 2020	Es ist zu deinem Besten		€69,000	
43	October 25, 2020	Es ist zu deinem Besten		€48,000	
44	November 1, 2020	Greenland		€162,494	
45–52	8 November 2020 – 27 December 2020	For these weekends box office reporting was suspended due to the COVID-19 pandemic.			

== Notes ==
^{a} According to Comscore, for this weekend Sony did not report any numbers.

== See also ==
- Cinema of Austria

Preceded by 2019	2020	Succeeded by 2021
