= Mohamed bin Issa Al Jaber =

Saudi Arabian businessman

Mohamed bin Issa Al Jaber (Arabic: محمد بن عيسى الجابر, romanized: Muḥammad bin ʿĪssā al-Ǧābir) is an Arab billionaire businessman.

== Business ==
In 1982, Al Jaber founded Jadawel International Construction & Development. He is founder, chairman and CEO of the MBI Group. He owns 80% of the Group. The MBI Group activities include various entities including the following companies:

- JJW Hotels & Resorts, including luxury hotels in Austria, France, Portugal and the United Kingdom. Amarante 4-star hotels in France, Portugal and Egypt

Al Jaber was listed as a billionaire in March 2013 by Forbes and in May 2014 featured in The Sunday Times Rich List at number 13, the highest entry for an Arab. Arabian Business's 2013 rich list 'The world's richest Arabs' puts Al Jaber at number 2 with $12.66bn. Bloomberg Billionaires reported his net worth as $7.19BN as of August 2018 and Forbes Austria at $7BN in December 2023.

=== Portugal ===
In September 2003, Al Jaber took over the management of Quinta Vale Da Gondra Hotel e SPA (Unipessoal) Lda. In January 2008, Portuguese press revealed that Al Jaber is expanding his business in the Algarve and investing about €200 million to buy the Hotel Dona Filipa in Vale do Lobo, the golf course San Lourenzo in Quinta do Lago, the Hotel Penina and its 3 golf courses from Starman (a joint venture between the Lehman Brothers bank and Starwood Capital Group). Other assets in the regions are the Pinheiros Altos Golf Resort and the Formosa Hotel. In 2013 JJW Hotels and Resorts took over the management of the Penina Hotel and Golf Resort, and also announced plans for a major refurbishment of the Dona Filipa. Mohsen MBI Al Jaber, son of Mohamed Bin Issa Al Jaber, has held the role of Vice President of the Portugal sector of the MBI Group since October 2015.

=== Austria ===
In 2002, Al Jaber acquired the famous Grand Hotel, Vienna from the Japanese airline All Nippon Airways. He later acquired the premises of a former bank on Kärntner Ring and converted the building to the boutique Ring Hotel. In October 2006, he bought the Palais Corso, Vienna's premier luxury shopping and office complex from Generali Versicherung, for about €70 million. In 2007, JJW purchased the Palace Schwarzenberg Hotel in Vienna and unsuccessfully sought to expand the hotel.

In 2007, Al Jaber agreed to invest 10% in the building of the Vienna Tourism University (Modul University Vienna), and provided scholarships for students there.

In the beginning of 2008, Al Jaber sought to purchase a 20% stake in the financially troubled Austrian Airlines. However, he withdrew his offer in May 2008 after the company published its negative quarterly results, based on the grounds that the company intentionally withheld the actual level of trouble faced. Auditor Herbert Heiser, who was called by the court to consult in the legal dispute between AUA and Al Jaber, agreed with Al Jaber's conclusions. He states in his report that rather than its officially declared profit of €3.3 million, the AUA should have revealed a hefty loss – of around €235 million. In 2023, Al Jaber won the legal dispute with Austrian Airlines. Vienna Commercial Court ruled that he was entitled to withdraw from an investment contract concluded in April 2008 due to clear misconduct on the part of Austrian Airlines. Al Jaber announced that he will file a lawsuit against AUA to compensate for business and reputational damage.

In July 2008, Al Jaber took a 60% stake in Kneissl Holding GmbH, an Austrian manufacturer of sports equipment, and in 2015 the JJW Group acquired 100% of the company.

In May 2011, Al Jaber said that he was defamed by Austrian Media after it implied financial difficulties in some of the companies that Al Jaber had invested in. He accused the newspapers of reporting a one-sided version of events.

In October 2020, Al Jaber and Robert Zadrazil, CEO of Bank Austria UniCredit, reached an amicable end to a legal dispute that had existed since 2012 following constructive discussions between the parties. As part of the resolution, the two business leaders have committed to work together in an attempt to strengthen the Austrian economy.

=== France ===
The Group opened their first office in France in 1991. The hotel empire of Al Jaber was initially started in France in 1988 and expanded to over 35 hotel properties in France and almost 80 in Europe. In October 2008, it was announced that the Group planned to acquire a number of hotels in France from the Starwood Capital Group for $2billion but the deal was not concluded.

== Personal life ==
Al Jaber is married and has three children. His children are all Trustees of the MBI Al Jaber Foundation. In 2007, Al Jaber obtained Austrian nationality.

Al Jaber is the founder and Chairman of the MBI Al Jaber Foundation, founded in 2002. MBI Al Jaber is the founding patron and donor of the London Middle East Institute at SOAS and the MBI Al Jaber Chair in Middle East Studies. MBI Al Jaber has donated to Corpus Christi College, University of Oxford; University of Westminster; and London School of Hygiene and Tropical Medicine. MBI Al Jaber was co-founding patron of the Olive Tree Programme at City, University of London, which ran from 2004 to 2016, and which brought Israeli and Palestinian students together to study in London.

He has been on the advisory board of the Middle East Centre of the London School of Economics (LSE). In 2003, MBI Al Jaber donated SR21 million to Dar Al-Hekma University for women in Jeddah. In 2013 the MBI Al Jaber Foundation launched a Media Training Institute in Sana'a, Yemen; with a view to promoting a free press, the institute offered free courses in all types of journalism and broadcasting. Between 2013 and 2015, the MBI Al Jaber Foundation spent approx £1.2m; it spent £114,000 in 2016; and less than £40,000 in 2017. The foundation reported no income or expenses for 2021–2024, and filed no report for 2025.

== See also ==
- Human Rights Watch: Criticism. HRW criticized aspects of his business morals and had to return a donation from him after facing accusations of corruption.
