= Pheme (project) =

Research project

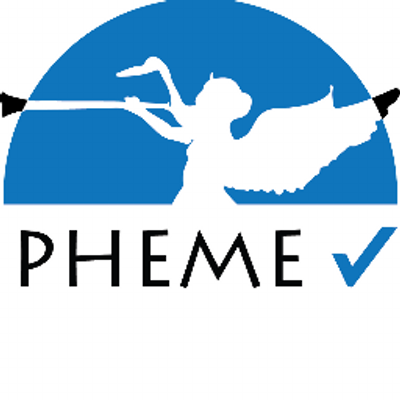
- Commercial?: No
- Type of project: Research
- Location: EU
- Owner: European Commission
- Funding: FP7 project, 36 months, EUR 4.3 M
- Website: http://www.pheme.eu

Pheme is a 36-month research project begun in 2014 into establishing the veracity of claims made on the internet.

== Introduction ==
Unverified content is dominant and prolific in social media messages. While big data typically presents challenges in its information volume, variety and velocity, social media presents a fourth: establishing veracity. The Pheme project aims to analyse content in real time and determine how accurate the claims made in it are. As claims propagate through a social network, each individual chooses whether or not to pass on information, based on how accurate they think it is. Analysing the language used and the spread of information through a network, as well as the spatial and temporal context of the information, is used to build a real-time lie detector for social media. This will help, for example, emergency services (who already integrate social media as part of their alerting and response systems) to flag potential hoax emergencies.

Evaluating the authority of sources automatically is also a project goal, based on the treatment of the news and information that comes from them. For example, a tweet of a BBC news article would hold more weight than one from an unknown source.

The project is named after the Greek goddess Pheme.

== Case studies ==
Pheme addresses social media lies in two scenarios: information about healthcare, which can be particularly damaging if wrong, and information used by journalists.

== Categories of rumour ==
Pheme addresses speculation, controversy, misinformation and disinformation.

== Partners ==
The project is a partnership between the University of Sheffield as part of GATE, the University of Warwick, King's College London, Saarland University in Germany and Modul University Vienna. Four companies are also taking part - Atos, iHub Nairobi, Ontotext and swissinfo. Pheme is funded by the EU.

== Relevant Publications ==
- L. Derczynski, K. Bontcheva. Passive-Aggressive Sequence Labeling with Discriminative Post-Editing for Recognising Person Entities in Tweets. Proceedings of the European Association for Computation Linguistics, 2014.
