= Austrian Economic Chamber =

Austrian federal chamber of commerce

Austrian Federal Economic Chamber
- Wirtschaftskammer Österreich
- Abbreviation: WKO
- Predecessor: Austrian Trade Association
- Formation: 1839; 187 years ago
- Type: Chamber of commerce
- Headquarters: Wiedner Hauptstraße 63
- President: Harald Mahrer
- Budget: €850 million (2013)
- Staff: 3,812 (2013)
- Website: www.wko.at

The Austrian Federal Economic Chamber (de: Wirtschaftskammer Österreich or WKO) functions as the federal parent organization for the nine State Chambers and 110 trade associations for different industries within Austria's system of economy. Most State Chambers and associations have local offices to provide services in close proximity to members.

Compulsory membership by Austrian federal law is automatic with obtaining the operating licence of the company and thus includes all Austrian companies in operation. The resultant membership of 517.477 active businesses as per 2017 includes diverse sectors such as trade and craft, commerce, industry, transportation, tourism, services industries, finance and insurance, but not agriculture, as this sector is served by its own Chamber.

== Main tasks and activities ==
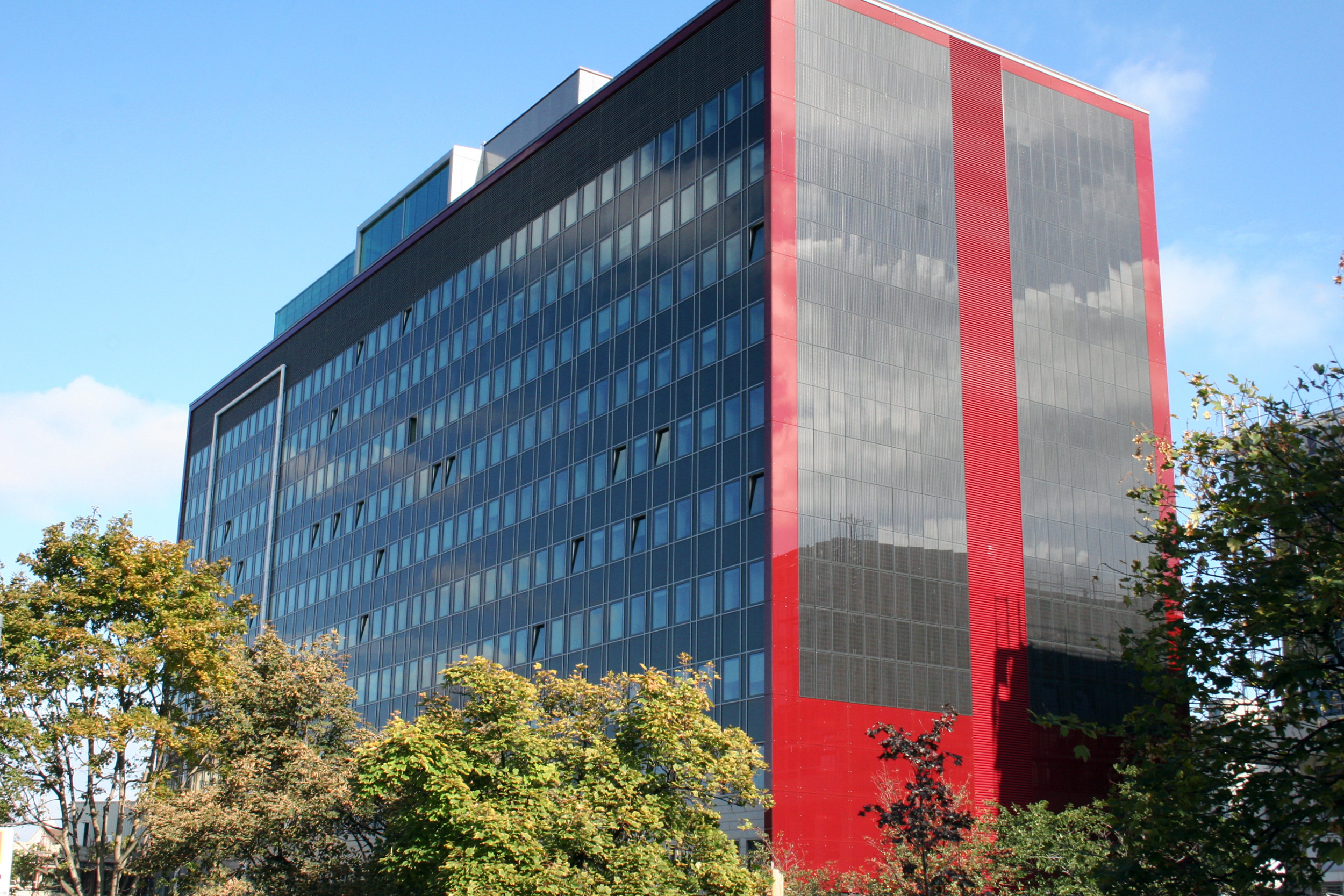
Building of the Austrian Federal Economic Chamber

Representation of membership interests at all levels of government. By law governments are obliged to consult with Chambers on legislative projects and important regulation. In many laws a provision is made to involve Chambers in decision-making and administrative procedures. Information and advisory service to members: Typical issues include taxation, labour law, vocational training, industry-specific legislation, industry-wide advertising and market research.

=== Collective bargaining with unions ===
Trade associations engage in negotiations with their respective sectoral countrywide union. Economic Promotion and Development as well as training and consulting are mainly organised by a specialised department in each region (WIFI, Wirtschaftsfoerderungsinstitut).

=== Business Support ===
Austrian companies interested in international business (trade and investment) and innovation are supported by a specialised department (AUSSENWIRTSCHAFT AUSTRIA) with more than 100 field offices around the world (ADVANTAGE AUSTRIA offices) plus a network of specialised experts within the State Chambers. The ADVANTAGE AUSTRIA offices act as Austria's official business representatives abroad and are notified as the Trade Sections of Austrian embassies and consulates abroad.

Public law (Wirtschaftskammergesetz) provides a legal foundation for the Austrian Federal Economic Chambers, supplying the legal framework for all Chambers, their co-operation, mandatory membership, and rules for setting membership fees. Although established by public law the Federal Economic Chambers are exclusively business driven.

Every 5 years entrepreneurs elect officers and representatives for the trade associations and the Chamber (amounting to a total of more than 10,000 officers) from their own ranks. In these elections free associations of entrepreneurs field their candidates to compete for the leadership of the Chambers and individual trade associations. Some of these entrepreneurial associations are affiliated with political parties while others are independent platforms. Since 2018 Dr. Harald Mahrer is the current President of the Austrian Federal Economic Chamber.

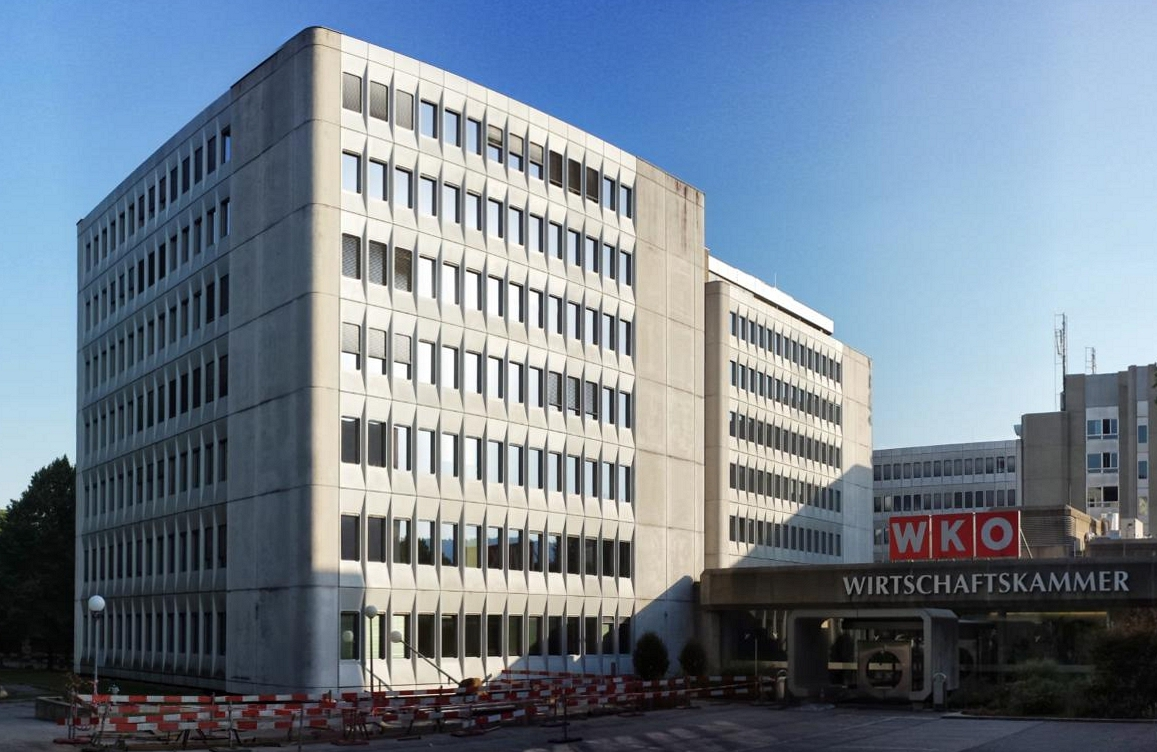
Building of the Economic Chamber in Graz

The Austrian Federal Economic Chamber is financially self-sufficient with around 85% of expenditure covered by member contributions and a further 15% by revenues from marketable sales. This factor, combined with organisational management through democratic self-government, makes them independent from public authorities.

== Advantage Austria ==
In Austria the promotion of foreign trade constitutes is, by law, one major part of the activities of the Austrian Federal Economic Chamber. The importance of international business and access to international innovation to Austria is reflected in the wide range of services provided by AdvantageAustria.org (AUSSENWIRTSCHAFT AUSTRIA) with an international network of more than 100 ADVANTAGE AUSTRIA Offices worldwide, in most cases sections of the Austrian embassies and consulates in the respective countries.

AUSSENWIRTSCHAFT AUSTRIA offers Austrian businesses a wide range of complementary services relating to foster international trade (exports and imports), investing outside of Austria and supporting Austrian companies abroad including business expertise and individual consultancy, match-making with potential business partners and trusted consultants, access to international innovation networks. The offices can provide market overviews, research potential agents, importers and cooperation partners for Austrian companies and background checks on potential partners. AdvantageAustria.org is also responsible for the organization of trade missions and Austria's official country pavilions at international trade fairs.

The heads of the ADVANTAGE AUSTRIA offices and their teams also assist local companies in accessing official information on Austria as a business location and in identifying Austrian companies interested in doing international business. www.advantageaustria.org
