= Revolutions of 1848 =

Series of political upheavals in Europe

- Part of the Age of Revolution
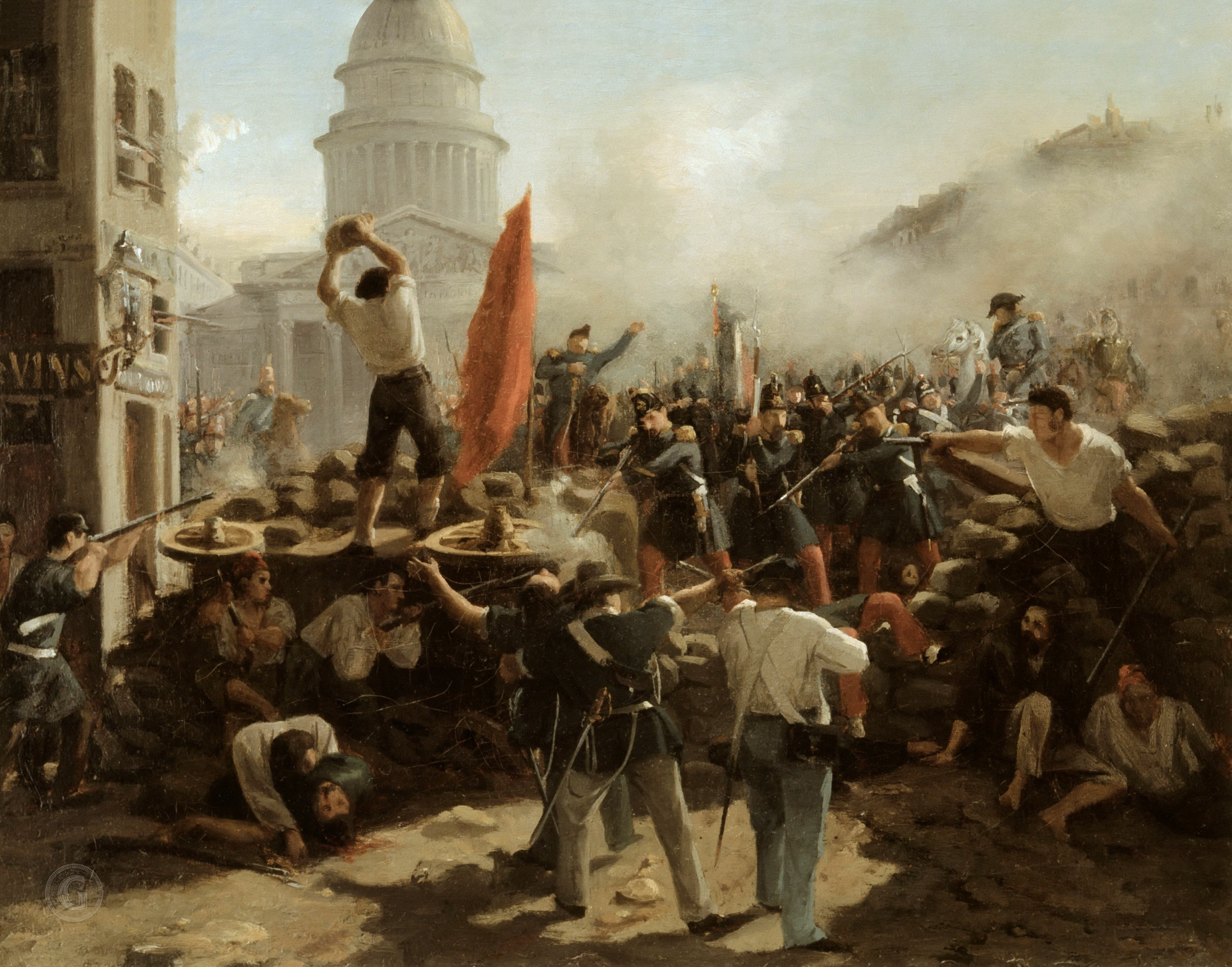
- Barricade on the rue Soufflot, an 1848 painting by Horace Vernet depicting the June Days uprising. A red flag, symbol of the workers, is visible in opposition to the tricolour of the French Second Republic.
- Date: 12 January 1848 – 4 October 1849
- Location: Europe
- Also known as: Springtime of the peoples
- Participants: People and governments of France, the German Confederation, the Austrian Empire, Italian states, Denmark, Ireland, Moldavia, Wallachia, Greater Poland, and others
- Outcome: See Events by country or region: Political change in a few countries; Significant social and cultural change

The revolutions of 1848, also known as the springtime of the peoples, (Note: From German Völkerfrühling, this name is applied to both the events of the spring of 1848 and the revolutions as a whole.) were a series of revolutions throughout Europe that spanned almost two years, between January 1848 and October 1849. They remain the most widespread revolutionary wave in European history to date.

The revolutions varied widely in their aims but generally opposed conservative systems, such as absolute monarchy and feudalism, and sought to establish nation states, founded on constitutionalism and popular sovereignty. The revolutionary wave began with the revolution in Sicily in January and spread across Europe after the revolution in France in February 1848. Over fifty countries were affected, but with no significant coordination or cooperation among their respective revolutionaries. Some of the major political contributing factors were widespread dissatisfaction with political leadership, demands for more participation in government and democracy, for freedom of the press, and by the working class for economic rights, and the rise of nationalism. Other economic factors, such as the European potato failure, triggered mass starvation, migration, and civil unrest.

The uprisings were led by temporary coalitions of workers and reformers, including figures from the middle and upper classes (the bourgeoisie); however, these coalitions did not hold together for long. Many of the revolutions were quickly suppressed, as tens of thousands of people were killed, and even more were forced into exile. Despite this, significant lasting reforms included the abolition of serfdom in Austria and Hungary, the end of absolute monarchy in Denmark, and the introduction of representative democracy in the Netherlands. The revolutions were most prominent in France, Italy, the Austrian Empire, and the states of the German Confederation that would make up the German Empire in the late 19th and early 20th centuries. The wave of uprisings ended in October 1849.

== Background ==
The revolutions were shaped by a wide variety of causes, which were linked to the short- and long-term socioeconomic transformations brought about by industrialization and the political legacy of the French Revolution. These included the adoption of modern agricultural practices that led to rapid and destabilizing population growth, the intensification of industrialization and urbanization, the repressive political environment established in reaction to the French Revolution, and the spread of ideologies opposed to repressive governments, including liberalism, radicalism, and nationalism. In addition to longer-term trends, an acute economic crisis between 1845 and 1847, resulting from the combination of a food crisis and an industrial recession, led to significant civil unrest and revolutionary agitation. The failure of governments to adequately address popular demands for reform led to an accumulation of discontent across Europe, culminating in the simultaneous outbreak of revolutions across the continent in 1848.

=== Social discontent and conflict ===
==== In rural areas ====
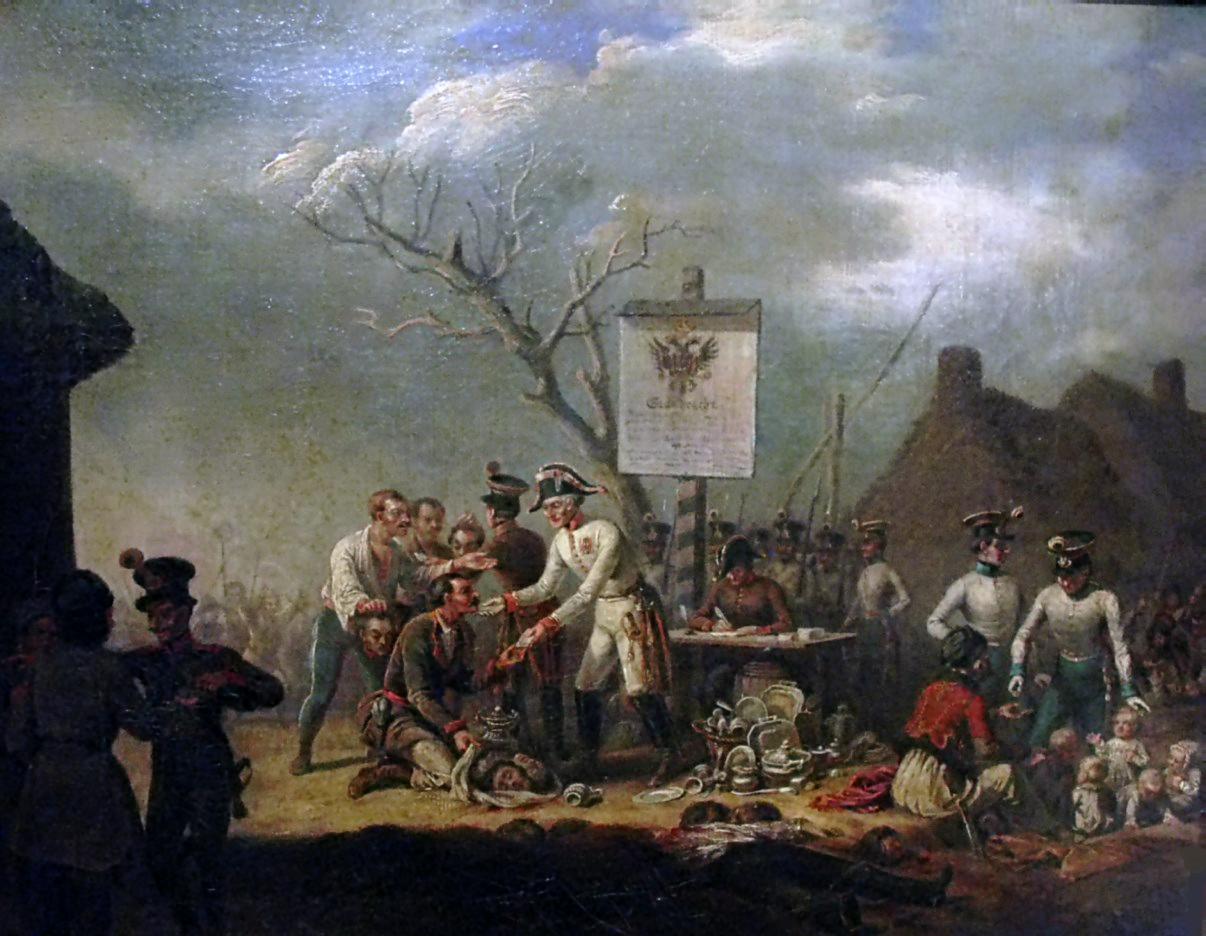
Galician Massacre (Polish: Rzeź galicyjska) by Jan Lewicki depicts the fictional rewarding of Polish peasants by Austrian authorities for massacring their lords, who had attempted an uprising to reestablish an independent Polish state.

According to Jonathan Sperber, conflict over agricultural land rights was the most prevalent form of social conflict in the pre-revolutionary period. The abolition of feudalism in parts of Western and Central Europe (especially in France) in the wake of the French Revolutionary and Napoleonic Wars had major ramifications for the rural populace. Customary rights that peasants had once held on common land, especially to acquire wood from communal forests, were increasingly lost with the enclosure and privatization of the commons. These processes were often aided by modernizing states, such as France, which, with the enactment of the Forest Code of 1827, legally abolished peasants' rights to forests and the wood within them.

Peasants resorted to both legal and violent means to reclaim their land rights. Lawsuits were frequently filed by peasants against landowners, and could remain active for decades; one such lawsuit in Sicily was first brought in 1829 and not settled until 1896. Peasants also stole wood from privatized forests or occupied them to reassert their land rights by force. Wood theft in particular was widespread in parts of Germany. Between the 1820s and 1840s, the number of those convicted of wood theft in the Bavarian Palatinate increased from 37,500 in 1821–22 to 185,000 in 1846–47, accounting for a third of the population. In France, opposition to the Forest Code led to the "War of the Maidens" from 1829 to 1832, in which peasants disguised in women's clothes violently resisted the Code's implementation in the department of Ariège.

Unrest among the peasantry was also widespread in regions that retained feudalism, as in parts of Central Europe and most of Eastern Europe, though this had been commonplace for several centuries. Disputes and revolts were directed variously at oppressive lords, taxation and military conscription by the state, and religious authorities. The largest pre-revolutionary peasant uprising against feudal lords occurred in Austrian Galicia in 1846, which put an end to the Kraków Uprising by the Polish nobility.

==== Among urban workers ====
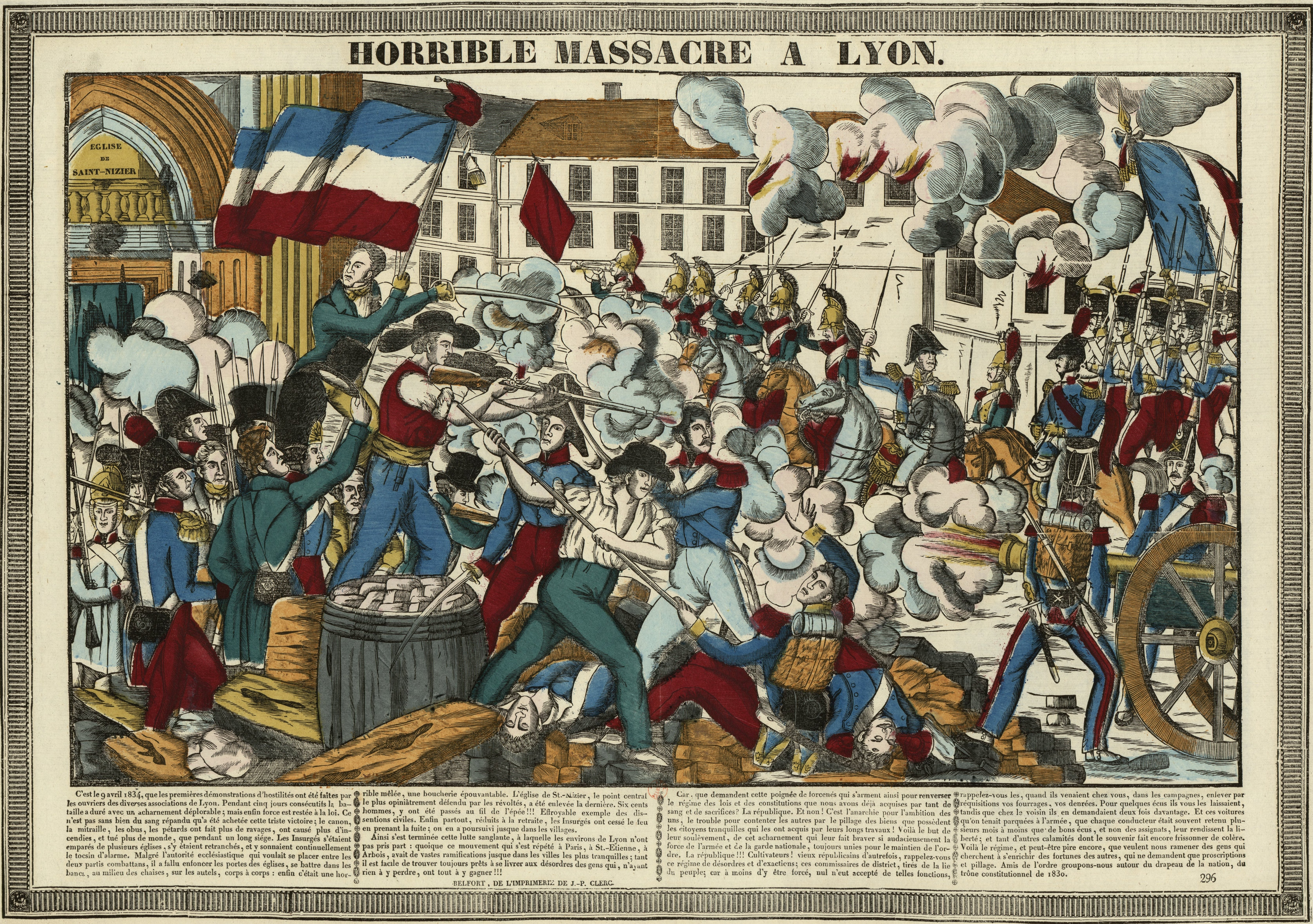
Silk weavers in Lyon revolted in 1831 and 1834 in response to the refusal of their employers to pay agreed rates for their labour. Their motto was "Live working or die fighting!" (French: Vivre en travaillant, mourir en combattant).

Rapid population growth was the most serious issue affecting urban workers, as migration into the cities due to poor conditions in the countryside led to a major oversaturation of labour markets and a decline in real wages among workers, while the cost of living continued to increase. Poor workers became more vulnerable to economic shocks, and the inability to afford foodstuffs other than potatoes and bread proved catastrophic amid a major food crisis affecting both between 1845 and 1847. Industrialization and the transition from the traditional economy to capitalist production also negatively affected urban workers, leading to a decline in their standard of living and social status. Most workers in 1848 were artisans who worked in the trades, while there were relatively few factory workers. Mechanization threatened some trades, such as the textile industry and metalworking, leading to a growing sense of insecurity among artisans, who felt their livelihoods and economic agency threatened.

The most prevalent disputes, however, were between employers and workers. Master craftsmen and journeymen came into increasing conflict as the guild system was weakened across Europe in the early nineteenth century. Under the new economy, master craftsmen began to accumulate wealth and were able to hire more workers, many of whom were unemployed due to the massive surplus of artisans. At the same time, masters sought to prevent the growing number of journeymen and apprentices from ever advancing to become masters to protect their economic interests from growing competition.

Both master craftsmen and journeymen were threatened by economic transformations within the proto-industrial putting-out system, in which self-employed artisans were contracted by capitalist merchants to manufacture finished products. Conflict between merchants and artisans, especially in the textile industry, was primarily over payment disputes, as merchants frequently underpaid outworkers for their finished products to maximize profit. These disputes led to civil unrest, including uprisings by weavers in Lyon in 1831 and 1834, and in Silesia in 1844. Deep frustration among artisans continued into 1848, as they demanded the right of association to reclaim economic agency lost during the transition. This was advocated for both in novel forms such as the establishment of cooperatives, mutual benefit societies, and early trade unions, as in France, or through a return to the traditional guild system, as in Germany.

==== Among the educated ====
The educated middle class was also affected by a decline in living standards. Across Western Europe, industrialization had increased the demand for professionals to support the new industries. Societal expectations also began to favor education and careerism as means to achieve upward mobility, especially after the French Revolution. As a result, more young men across Europe enrolled in universities, expecting, according to Lenore O'Boyle, that "the diploma might do what a title of nobility had once done" and they would achieve positions of leadership in society. In the more industrialized economies of Britain and the United States, more educated men were able to find work in private businesses, and consequently, there was little to no revolutionary agitation among them in 1848. In mainland Europe, however, where the pace of industrialization lagged, the only available professional careers were in the civil service, which could not open enough positions to meet demand.

The lack of work led to dissatisfaction among the educated, who felt that they were unable to live as their status demanded. This issue was most pronounced in Germany, where overcrowding in professional careers was so severe that it gave rise to what sociologist Wilhelm Heinrich Riehl termed an "intellectual proletariat" of "underpaid and aspiring lower civil servants, journalists, and schoolteachers". The intellectual proletariat was so numerous in Germany that, according to Riehl, they, not manual labourers, comprised "the real proletariat". Apart from the overcrowding of the professions, the middle class was also often deliberately excluded from political life and the bureaucracy by the state. Positions in the bureaucracy were restricted to those who could afford the education required for them, and, especially in France and the Austrian Empire, aristocrats remained influential, hindering career advancement. Professionals who could not find work turned to journalism as "the last refuge of those who had failed in other middle-class or professional careers", and were able to channel their frustration into political agitation, eventually becoming leaders in the revolutions in 1848.

=== Revolutionary politics ===
==== Ideology ====
New political ideologies were emerging in the 1840s that would go on to influence the revolutions in 1848, with liberalism, radicalism, and nationalism being the principal opposition movements to European governments.

Liberals formed a distinct political force in the 19th century but varied widely in their beliefs. Generally, liberals supported equality before the law and the protection of civil liberties, such as the freedoms of speech, the press, association, religion, and especially to own property, and favoured constitutions to achieve such. They opposed both absolute monarchies and radical republics, which they viewed as equally despotic, and favoured constitutional monarchies as a balance between the two extremes. They favoured popular sovereignty, but made a distinction between "the people" and "the rabble". To that end, liberalism generally sought a restriction of the franchise to male property-owners. Liberals were reluctant to engage in revolution or seek popular support due to their fears of a radical takeover and violent mob rule, as they had experienced during the French Revolution under the Jacobins and the Reign of Terror. Liberals saw gradual, political reforms and economic development through parliaments, free markets, industrialization, and public education as means by which societal equality could be achieved, as more men could become property-owners and enter into political life. When liberals gained power, as in the July Monarchy in France after 1830, they trended toward conservatism, and their restriction of political life alienated wide swaths of the population, bringing them into conflict with the radical left.

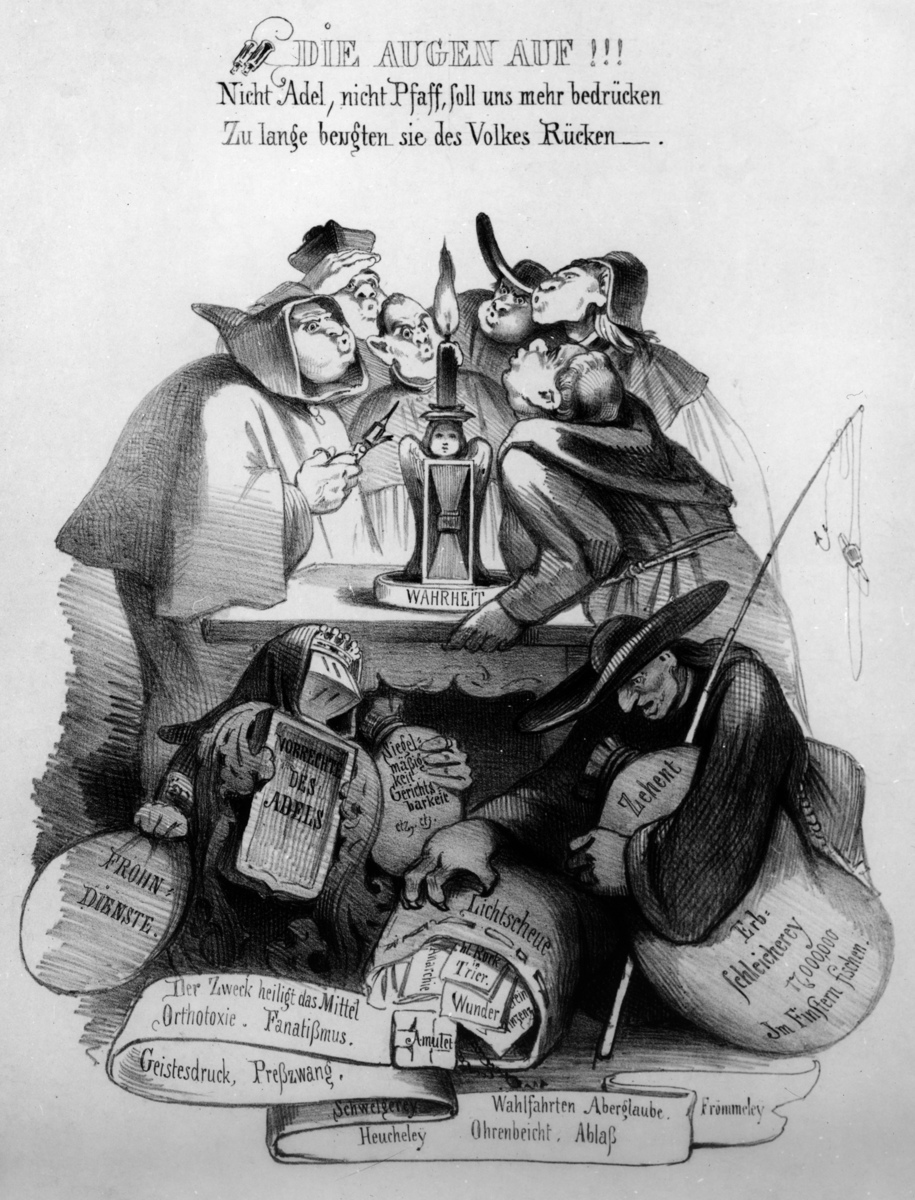
An anti-clerical and anti-aristocratic print, published in Germany in 1845. The text reads: "Eyes Open!!!—Neither the nobility, nor the clergy will oppress us any longer; they have broken the backs of the people for too long."

Radicalism generally represented the loose and ill-defined coalition of democrats and socialists. Radicals differed from moderate liberals in their support for democracy and universal manhood suffrage, extending the franchise to all adult men. Both liberals and radicals shared in their opposition to "backwards" institutions, and especially in their anti-clericalism, though radicals were notably more violent in their opposition. While liberals were generally more concerned with political and legal questions and sought the expansion of civil liberties, radicals placed greater weight on the "social question", or the question of how to address the growth and precarity of the working poor in the capitalist economy. Radicals were divided as to how to address the social question; radical democrats generally sought to address it through regulation and state intervention, whereas socialists sought the abolition of capitalism and economic redistribution. Some radical democrats were economic liberals who tended to support political reform, especially universal manhood suffrage, over social and economic reform, and did not support government intervention of any sort. (Note: Broers argues a greater distinction between radicals and socialists, characterizing radicals as broadly economically liberal in comparison to socialists, who were more interventionist.) Both democrats and socialists were, however, united in their desire to overthrow the existing regimes through revolution.

"Nationalism" promoted the unity and primacy of people bound by some mix of common language, culture, religion, shared history and destiny, and immediate geography. There were also irredentist movements. Nationalism had developed a broader appeal during the pre-1848 period, as seen in the František Palacký's 1836 History of the Czech Nation, which emphasized a national lineage of conflict with the Germans, or the popular patriotic Liederkranz (song-circles) that were held across Germany: patriotic and belligerent songs about Schleswig had dominated the Würzburg national song festival in 1845.

==== Expression and participation ====
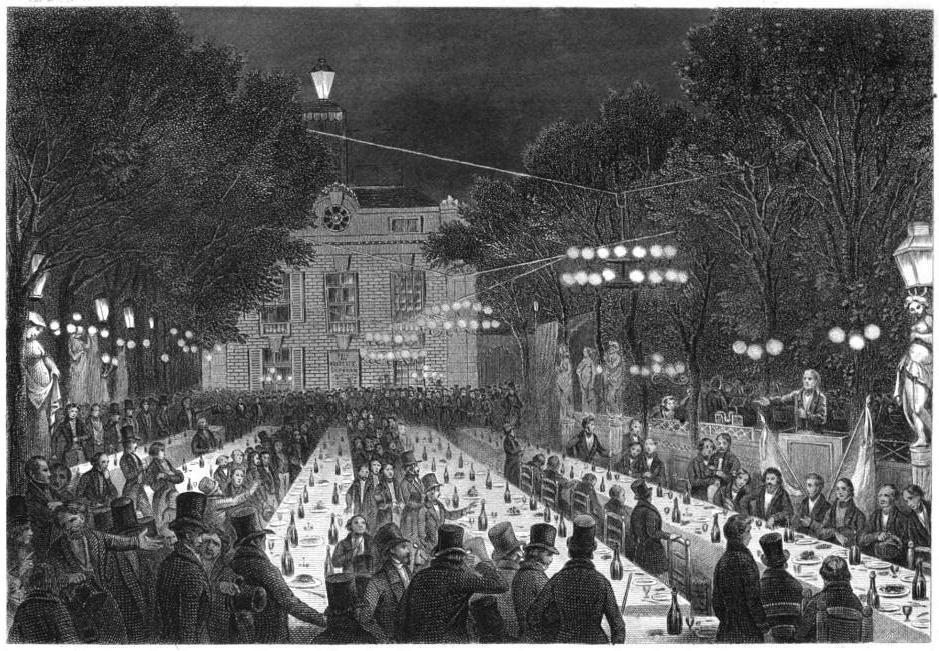
The beginning of the campagne des banquets in France on 9 July 1847. Public festivities such as banquets were a common form of political participation in the pre-revolutionary period.

Political participation was increasing in the pre-revolutionary period, though it was limited in scope, and what forms existed were heavily restricted by state authorities. Where elections were held, very few people could vote or run for office due to strict property requirements; in France, for example, the franchise was open to 0.5 percent of the population, or 241,000 people out of a population of 26 million.

Outside of elections, the reading, writing, and publishing of newspapers was the most basic form of political participation and expression, and the means by which political awareness as a whole was expanding. Papers such as the Rheinische Zeitung in Germany and La Réforme in France became outlets for oppositional thought. Circulation was generally low, ranging from several thousand for regional papers to hundreds for town and city papers. However, newspapers were often available to read communally or were read aloud to large public gatherings for those who were illiterate, allowing for a wider dissemination of political thought. Mass politics was carried out through public celebrations, such as festivals and banquets, which were organized as de facto political rallies to circumvent state restrictions on them.

Informal political organizations existed to a degree in informal social circles, such as reading clubs, coffeehouses, and Masonic lodges. Formal political parties and organizations were largely banned, leading the editorial staffs of newspapers to also became leaders of the political opposition. What formal organizations did exist were in the form of illegal secret societies, many of which attempted to organize unsuccessful uprisings in the pre-revolutionary period. Among the most famous was the Young Italy movement, part of the larger Young Europe international network led by Giuseppe Mazzini, whose activism and methods in political organization were widely admired by contemporaries and imitated by other revolutionaries.

=== Economic crisis ===
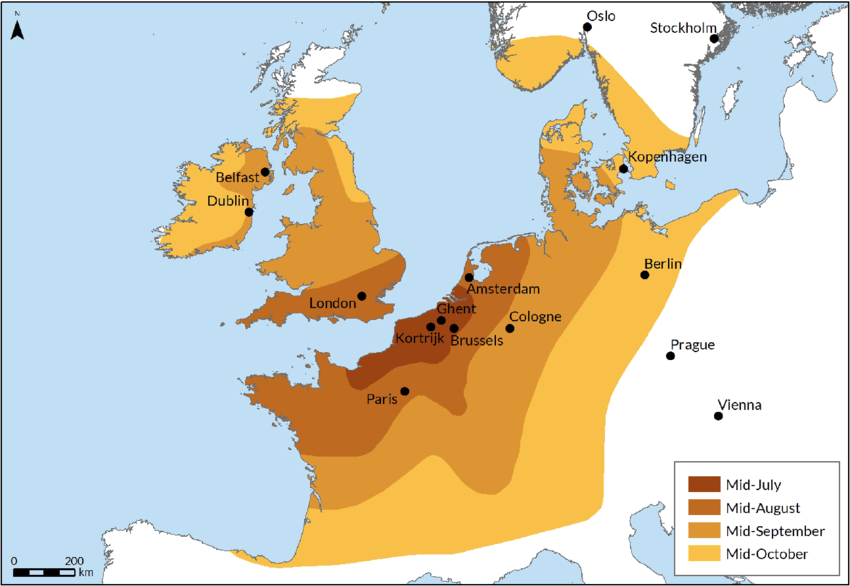
Spread of the potato blight in Europe in 1845

According to economic historians Helge Berger and Mark Spoerer, the most immediate cause of the revolutions of 1848 was the multitudinous economic crisis between 1845 and 1847. The crisis began with a major food crisis in Europe in 1845. Phytophthora infestans, the microorganism responsible for potato blight, arrived in Europe from North America around 1840 and spread rapidly during a period of unusually wet weather in 1845, devastating harvests across Northern Europe. Potatoes had become a staple food due to their high nutritional value and affordability, and were being grown on a large scale to feed growing populations, especially in Northern Europe. The effects of the potato blight were most severe in Ireland, where the Great Famine directly killed over an eighth of the population, or over 1 million people out of a population of 8 million. Other countries, including Scotland, Belgium, and the Netherlands saw similar damage to crops, with 60,000 deaths in the Netherlands due to the potato blight. Drought conditions in 1846 stopped the spread of the potato blight but damaged grain harvests, resulting in a sharp increase in food prices across the continent, and consequently virtually all foodstuffs became unaffordable for the poor. Food riots erupted across Europe as the poor attempted by force to stave off starvation, with over 400 such riots in France between 1846 and 1847 and 164 riots in the German states in 1847. (Note: Counts in Germany differ between sources: Clark 2023, p. 47 counts 158 riots in Prussia between April–May 1847, while Siemann 1998, p. 39 counts 103 protests between 1840 and 1847.)

Although severe famine was averted in most countries through strong government intervention, the rising cost of food, coupled with poor cotton harvests from the Southern United States necessary for textile manufacture, led to a major industrial recession in 1847. Unemployment and pauperism spread rampantly among urban communities: according to Christopher Clark, by 1847 a fifth of the population in Friesland in the Netherlands were receiving relief from the state, or 47,482 out of 245,000 people; and in the same period, "the number of residents officially classified as poor in German towns could swell to two thirds or even three fourths of the population". Berger and Spoerer found a strong correlation among the countries that were most deeply affected by the industrial shock of 1847 and those that underwent a revolution in 1848. (Note: The sole exception is the Netherlands, which Berger and Spoerer argue experienced a revolution (through its preemptive enactment of the Constitutional Reform of 1848) without having experienced an industrial shock.)

== Chronology ==
=== "Springtime of the peoples" (January–May 1848) ===
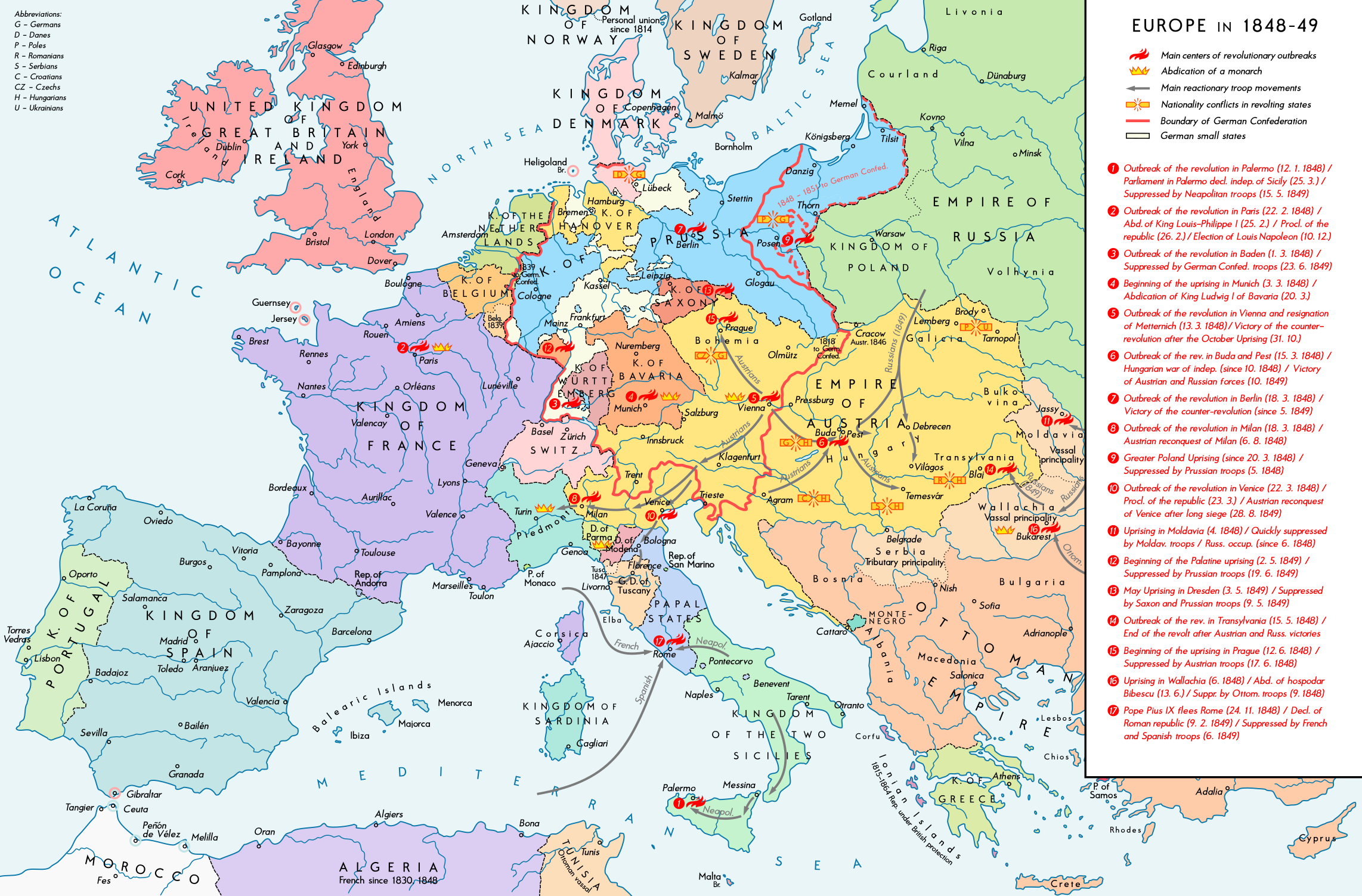
Map of Europe during the revolutions, showing major events, revolutionary centres, reactionary troop movements, and states with abdications and national conflicts.

The revolutionary events in 1848 began after the "February Revolution" in France, which overthrew the July Monarchy and led to the establishment of the French Second Republic. The revolution in France was not the first to occur, as a revolution had already occurred in January in the Kingdom of the Two Sicilies. In previous years, the Greater Poland uprising in 1846 and the Sonderbund War in Switzerland in 1847 had also seen similarly violent struggles for political reform. However, the revolution in France held far greater import among contemporaries due to the central role of France in European politics after the French Revolution, and the belief that the events in France were a portent for the rest of Europe.

Over the course of one week, news of the revolution in France spread rapidly throughout the continent and caused a media sensation, inspiring both excitement and fear alike. In Vienna, the news came "like a thunder-bolt from a clear sky, and caused a shock which vibrated though every nerve of her political system"; upon receiving word of the revolutions, Austrian chancellor Klemens von Metternich exclaimed, in French, "well, my dear, it's all over!" (Eh bien, mon cher, tout est fini!) Tsar Nicholas I of Russia was more belligerent, allegedly declaring to his courtiers, "saddle your horses gentlemen! The republic has been declared in France", and ordering a partial mobilization in response to the perceived military threat.

Within weeks of the revolution in France, similar uprisings occurred in Munich, Vienna, Buda and Pest, (Note: The modern city of Budapest was not founded until 1873, with the unification of Buda, Pest, and Óbuda.) Venice, Krakow, Milan, and Berlin through early-to-mid March. As the revolutions spread, reformers across Europe demanded the formation of a representative parliament, the freedom of the press, freedom of association, universal manhood suffrage, and the arming of the people under a national guard. Faced with overwhelming political pressure, governments capitulated without offering significant resistance, and granted various political concessions. In Austria, after violent clashes in Vienna from 13 to 15 March, Metternich was forced to resign and went into exile, and Emperor Ferdinand I pledged to grant an imperial constitution. Revolution broke out in Hungary shortly afterward, and the Diet of Hungary successfully appealed for Hungarian national sovereignty within the Habsburg monarchy. When the news from Vienna reached Austrian-ruled northern Italy some days later, revolutionary governments were declared in Milan and Venice, and the Kingdom of Piedmont–Sardinia declared war on Austria, beginning the First Italian War of Independence. In Prussia, after a brief but deadly spate of barricade fighting in Berlin on 18 March, King Frederick William IV ordered the army to withdraw, appointed a liberal ministry, and committed Prussia to the cause of German national unification.

==== Early achievements and conflicts ====
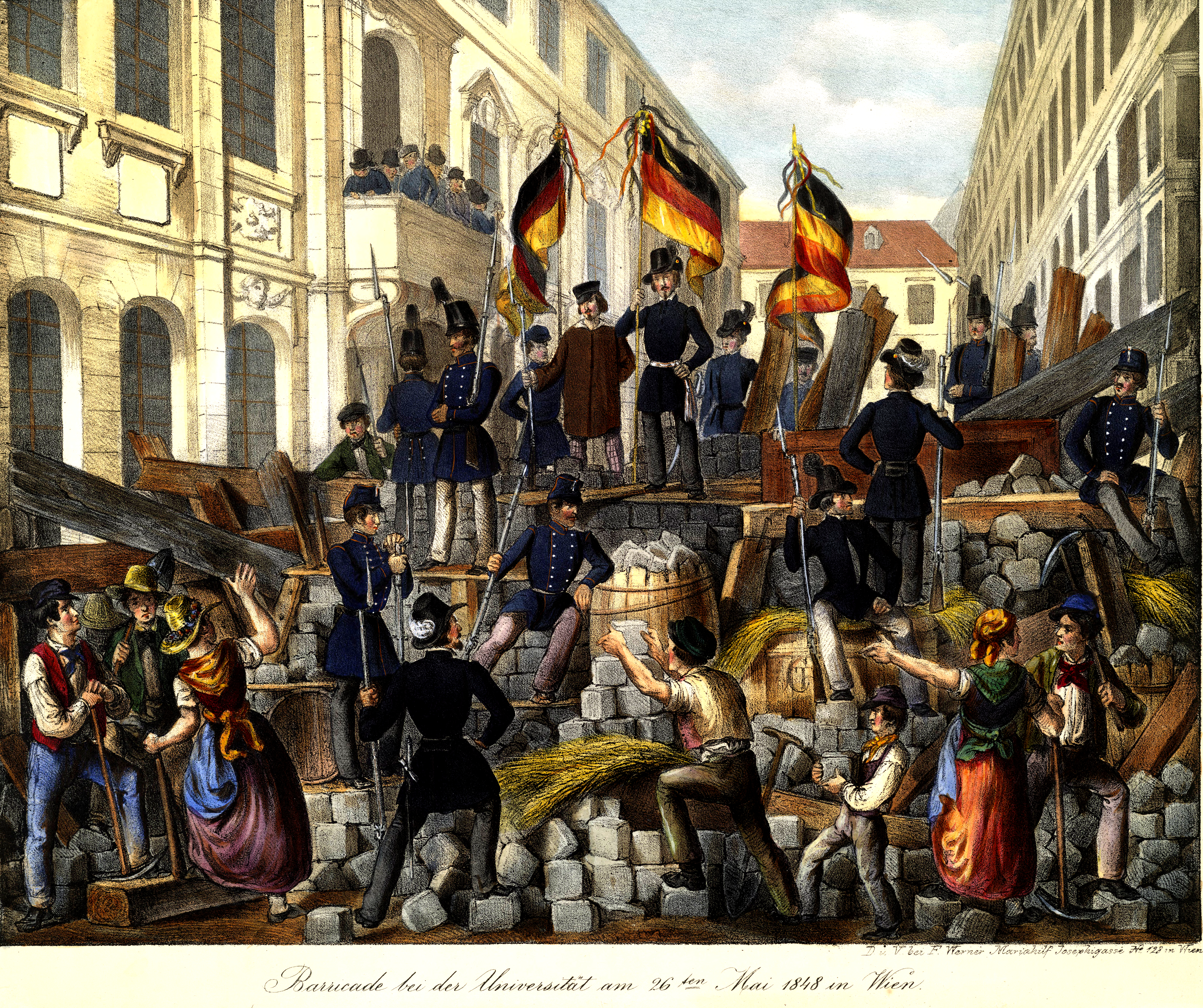
Revolutionary barricades in Vienna in May 1848, flying the flag of Germany

The earliest months of the revolutions were characterized by profound political change across Europe. Elections were held under broad franchises through the spring of 1848 for newly established or reformed parliaments. (Note: The size of the franchise could vary considerably. The French Constituent Assembly was directly elected under universal manhood suffrage. The Frankfurt National Assembly was indirectly elected under near-universal manhood suffrage. The Austrian Reichstag was elected through a broad franchise, but excluded itinerant or migrant workers, including many journeymen. The parliaments in Hungary, Croatia, and Italy imposed restrictive property requirements which prevented half to two-thirds of people from voting; the Hungarian Diet further required voters to speak Hungarian, disenfranchising non-Hungarians.) These included, among many others, the French Constituent Assembly, which replaced the unrepresentative Chamber of Deputies, the Austrian Reichstag, the Hungarian Diet, and five other national parliaments within the Austrian Empire, and the Frankfurt National Assembly, the first national parliament representing all of Germany.

Political participation increased substantially among the people as press censorship was relaxed and restrictions on association were lifted under the new constitutions. Political clubs and newspapers massively increased in number, extending political awareness to far more people than in the pre-revolutionary period. A labour movement also began to develop during the early revolutions, though workers' associations were less organized and widespread compared to political clubs.

A "revolutionary psychosis" was felt across Europe during the earliest phase of the revolutions as people celebrated the accomplishments of the "springtime of the peoples". Even in the smallest provincial towns in Germany "there were illuminations, festive parades by the riflemen’s associations, banquets of local notables, and embracing in the streets". A "wave of fraternization" was also felt, "uniting the most implausible elements"; in France "priests blessed the planting of trees of liberty", in Transylvania "Romanians and Hungarians [...] embraced each other", and in Mainz "Protestants, Catholics, and Jews [...] all came to the Rhineland city's cathedral to celebrate jointly the great tidings of liberty."

The early revolutions, however, also saw widespread violence and a major increase in social conflict, as people of all backgrounds sought to affect a social revolution and further their position or to violently seek revenge for various grievances. In urban centres, rioters ransacked the homes and offices of their employers, broke machines and destroyed factories and workshops, and attacked tax collectors and customs officials. In the countryside, peasants occupied and took control of lost common land; where feudalism remained, peasants attacked their lords and destroyed records of their obligations, and where it was abolished, they attacked government officials, especially foresters, who were perceived as infringing on peasants' customary rights to forests.

National conflicts also began to emerge in the late spring of 1848, especially in Germany and the multi-ethnic Austrian Empire. Efforts toward German national unification led to conflict with other nationalities within German territory, including Poles, Danes, and Czechs. In the Grand Duchy of Posen in eastern Prussia, an uprising by Polish nationalists led to conflict between Germans and Poles, despite earlier German support for Polish independence; the uprising was suppressed by Prussian troops by April. In Schleswig, the German population revolted against efforts by Denmark to annex the duchy, and were supported by the German states, leading to the First Schleswig War. Some maximalist German nationalists also sought to extend the German nation to the crown lands of the Habsburg monarchy, including the German Archduchy of Austria as well as Czech Bohemia, Slovenian Carniola, and Italian Trieste and Trentino. National conflicts pervaded throughout the entire Habsburg monarchy, especially in Hungary, where non-Magyars (especially Croats and Romanians) resisted attempts to form a homogeneous Hungarian nation, as well as in Galicia between Poles and Ruthenians, and Bohemia between Czechs and Germans.

=== Counter-revolution (May–December 1848) ===
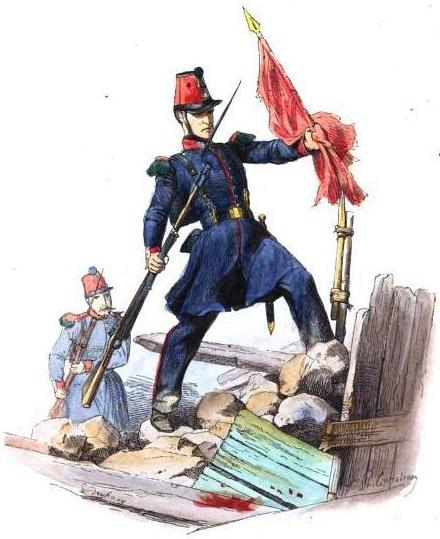
A soldier of the French Mobile Guard takes down the red flag from a barricade during the June Days

In the summer of 1848, serious divisions emerged in France between radical workers and the moderate government. In the early spring, the provisional government had been able to rely on their support, agreeing to their demands for the right to work and the "organization of labour" through the formation of the national workshops. However, after the conservative victory in the Constituent Assembly elections on 23 April and the radical attempt to overthrow the Assembly on 15 May, the new French government came under pressure to close them. After 15 May, the government also began to repress the left by jailing its leaders, closing its clubs and newspapers, and dissolving the Luxembourg Commission. On 21 June, the national workshops were closed, leading to a major insurrection by workers against the government, known as the "June Days". The uprising was suppressed with significant bloodshed by General Louis-Eugène Cavaignac, who was vested with dictatorial powers by the Constituent Assembly to restore order, targeting both the insurgents and the left-wing opposition in general.

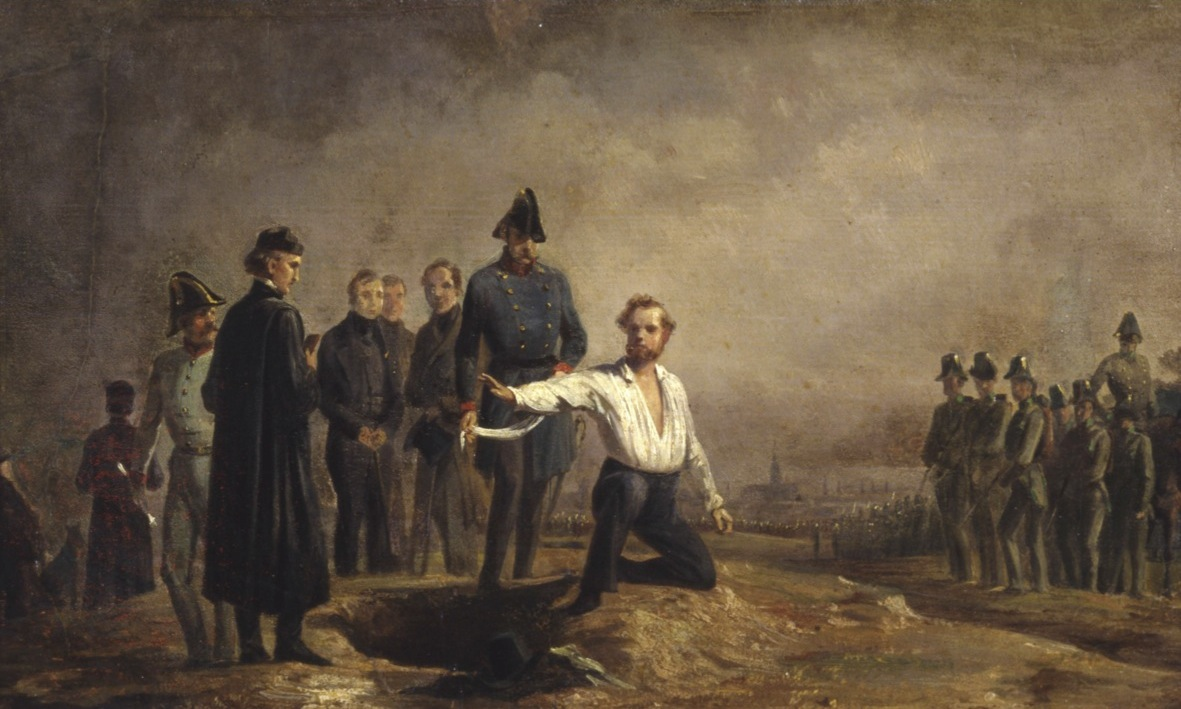
The execution of Robert Blum, an envoy of the Frankfurt National Assembly, on 9 November, at the end of the Vienna Uprising

The counter-revolution in the Austrian Empire was carried out largely by the army and conservatives in the Habsburg court. The first Habsburg victories were against the June Uprising in Prague, provoked by the reactionary Alfred I, Prince of Windisch-Grätz. The uprising was suppressed when the city was bombarded with artillery, despite attempts at conciliation by the liberal government of Baron Franz von Pillersdorf. More crucially in northern Italy, the army under Joseph Radetzky defeated the disorganized Piedmontese army at the Battle of Custoza in July, leaving Austria in near-total control of its Italian provinces. As conservatives gained strength, they mobilized Josip Jelačić, the Ban of Croatia, to invade Hungary and put an end to its sovereignty. The beginning of the Hungarian War of Independence on 11 September led to the Vienna Uprising in October, during which radicals occupied the city for three weeks, until they were crushed by the forces of Jelačić and Windisch-Grätz on 31 October.

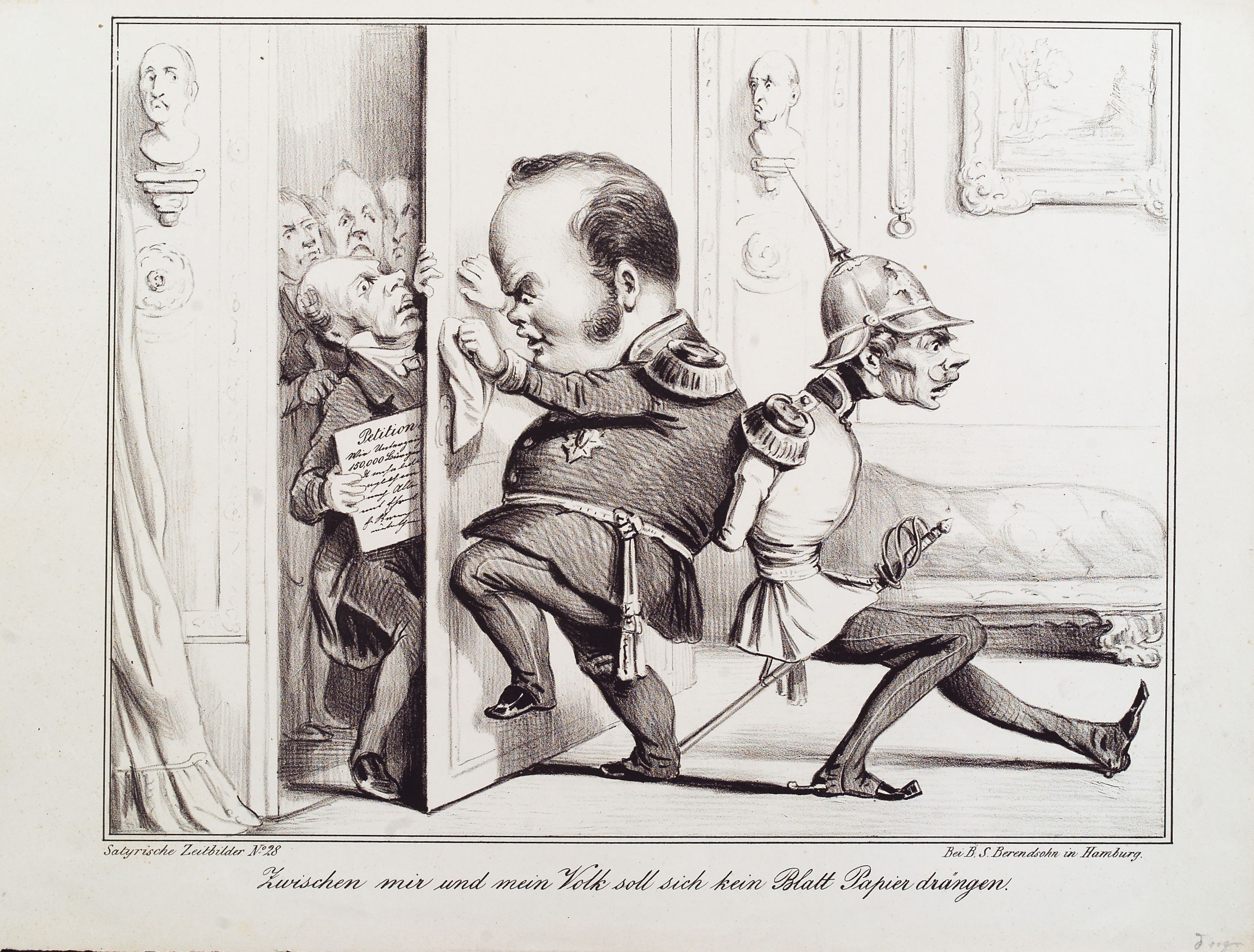
Caricature in the Satyrische Zeitbilder No. 28 of 1848 showing King Frederick William IV and Marshal Friedrich von Wrangel, commander-in-chief of the Prussian army, trying to close the door on delegates carrying the Constitution. The caption reads, "No sheet of paper shall come between me and my people."

In Germany, the counter-revolution began in the early autumn of 1848 with the reaction to the Armistice of Malmö, signed between Prussia and Denmark to temporarily suspend the Schleswig War. Although Prussia's unilateral action undermined the Frankfurt parliament's supremacy, the parliament was forced to accept the armistice due to the threat of a war with the great powers, especially Russia. Widespread anger at the Frankfurt parliament's "betrayal" of the German revolution, combined with frustration among the lower classes at the slow pace of reform, led to the outbreak of renewed uprisings in western Germany in September. The radical uprisings were crushed by the German states, with the support of the central government established by the Frankfurt parliament. With the execution of parliamentary deputy Robert Blum by Austrian troops at the end of the October uprising, the Frankfurt parliament's claims of exercising authority over any part of Germany were further discredited.

By the end of 1848, the springtime of the peoples was effectively over, and decidedly conservative governments had come into power across Europe. In Prussia, Frederick William IV, with the support of the army, carried out a coup d'état, dismissing the liberal ministers he appointed in the spring and imposing a conservative constitution. In Austria, Emperor Ferdinand I was made to abdicate in favour of his nephew Franz Joseph I, under the expectation that he would not be beholden to the constitutionalist concessions made during the revolutions. In France, Louis Napoléon Bonaparte, nephew of the last French emperor, was elected president, in large part with the backing of conservatives, who expected him to restore public order in the wake of the June Days.

=== Second wave of the revolutions (1849) ===
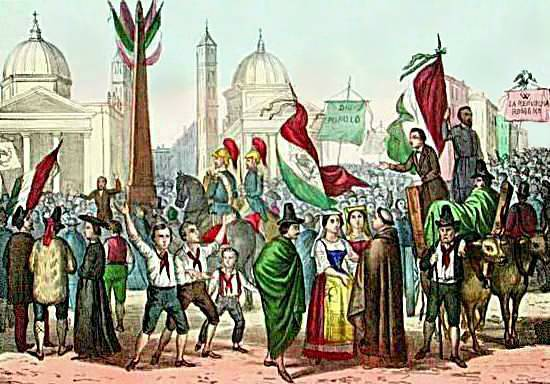
The proclamation of the Roman Republic in February 1849

At the end of 1848, the revolutions were over where they had begun, with the major centres in Paris, Vienna, Berlin, and Milan largely pacified. However, the expansion of political activity in 1848 allowed for radicals to begin organizing in new regions outside of the major cities. In France and Germany, left-wing organizations turned to the provinces, achieving greater support among rural workers in parliamentary elections in 1849. Meanwhile, in central Italy and Hungary, the revolutions gained new strength, and established new regimes to contest the old order.

In central Italy, radicals gained power in the Grand Duchy of Tuscany and the Papal States, proclaiming the Tuscan Republic and the Roman Republic in February. Together with Piedmont–Sardinia, where radicals won the parliamentary elections, the new revolutionary governments in Italy began to make plans for an all-Italian constituent assembly, as had been formed in Germany, and resumed the war with Austria. Piedmont–Sardinia was again decisively defeated by Austria at the Battle of Novara in March, resulting in the abdication of Piedmontese King Charles Albert and the end of the war in August.

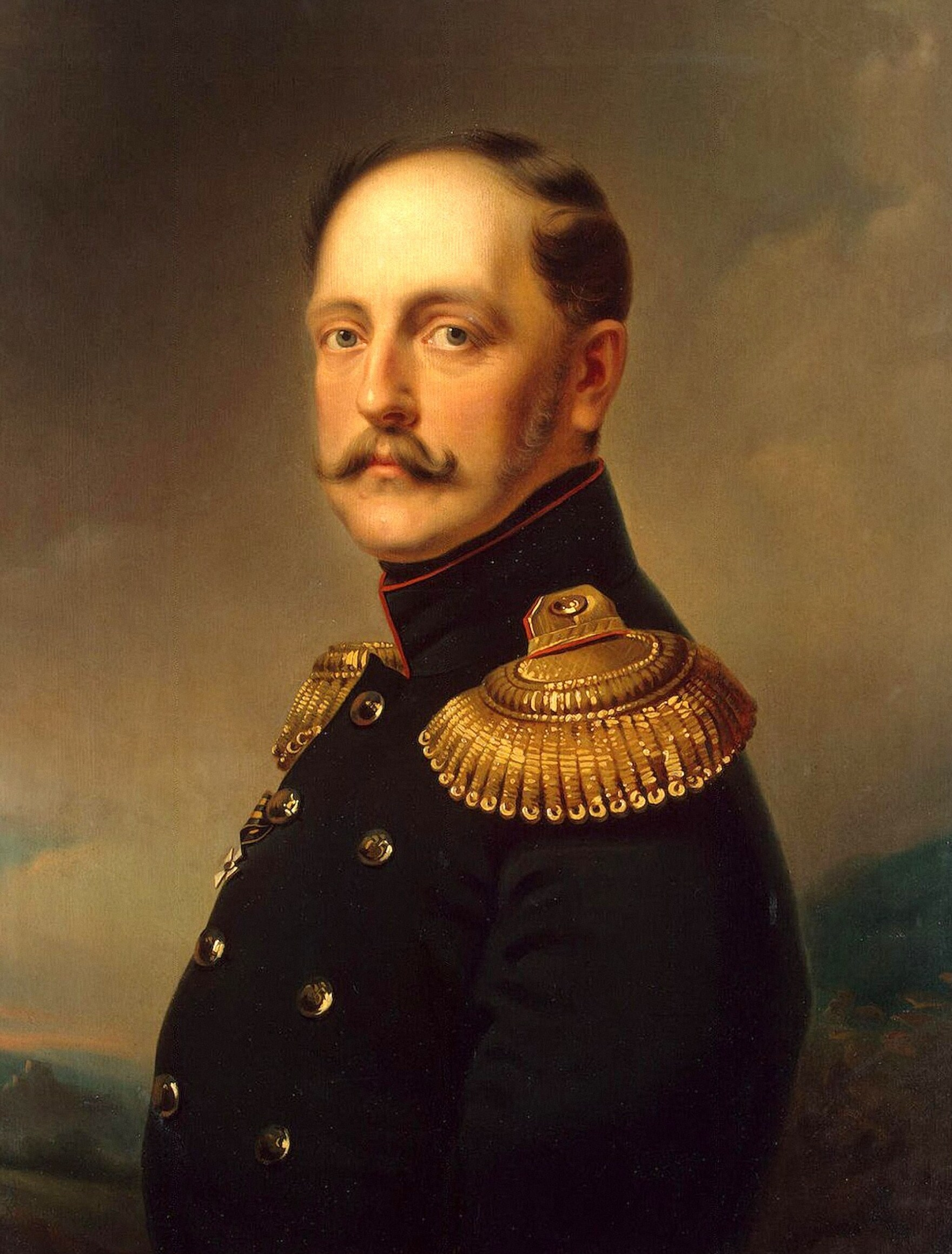
Nicholas I of Russia, the "gendarme of Europe"

Counter-revolution continued in the Habsburg empire under the new emperor Franz Joseph, with the imperial government dissolving the Reichstag and rejecting its constitutional proposal in favour of the imposed March Constitution. The new constitution applied to the entire empire, ending Hungary's autonomy and mandating its partition into several military districts. In response, Hungary declared full independence from the Habsburg empire and dethroned Franz Joseph as King of Hungary. Through the spring, Hungary launched a military campaign that led to the recapture of almost all of Hungary's territory from Habsburg forces. Facing a new crisis in Hungary, the Habsburg empire appealed for Russia's intervention in "the holy struggle against anarchy". Russia mobilized 200,000 troops to invade Hungary, combined with 175,000 Habsburg troops, against the 170,000 troops of Hungary, many of whom were ill-equipped and exhausted. For Russia's support, Austria offered no concessions, and Russia demanded none.

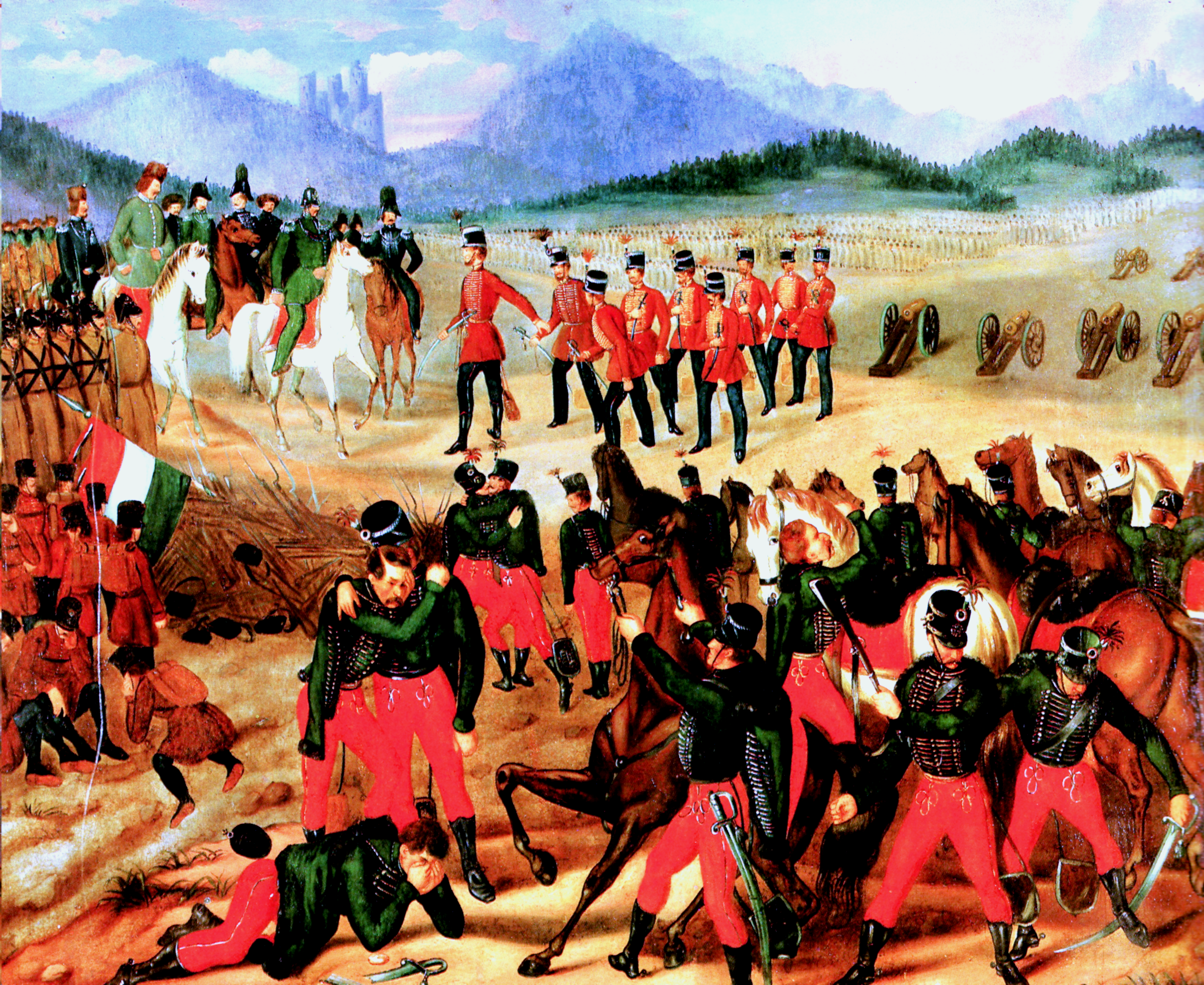
The Surrender at Világos of the Hungarian revolutionaries on 13 August. The last Hungarian forces surrendered by October at the fortress of Komárom.

In Germany, after much deliberation, the Frankfurt National Assembly agreed to the Frankfurt Constitution for the new German Empire in March 1849, and elected Frederick William IV to serve as Emperor of the Germans. However, he rejected the crown on the basis that the Assembly did not have the authority to confer it, and he further denounced the Frankfurt Constitution, refusing any restrictions on his monarchical powers. In response, a new wave of uprisings swept through Germany during the Imperial Constitution campaign as radicals, working largely among the lower classes, sought to force the acceptance of the Frankfurt Constitution. The campaign, lasting between May and July 1849, ultimately ended in defeat, ending the German revolutions.

After the summer of 1849, the last remaining revolutionary regimes were in Rome, Venice, and Hungary. The revolutionary Roman Republic was defeated in July after the intervention of France, and Venice surrendered in August after enduring more than a year of siege and isolation. With the entry of Russia into the war, Hungary, the last revolutionary state, was placed on the defensive, suffering numerous defeats between late June and August. On 13 August, Hungary surrendered to Austria and Russia, formally ending the war of independence; the last Hungarian holdouts at the fortress of Komárom surrendered between 2 and 5 October, marking the end of the revolutions of 1848.

== Events by country or region ==
=== Italian states ===
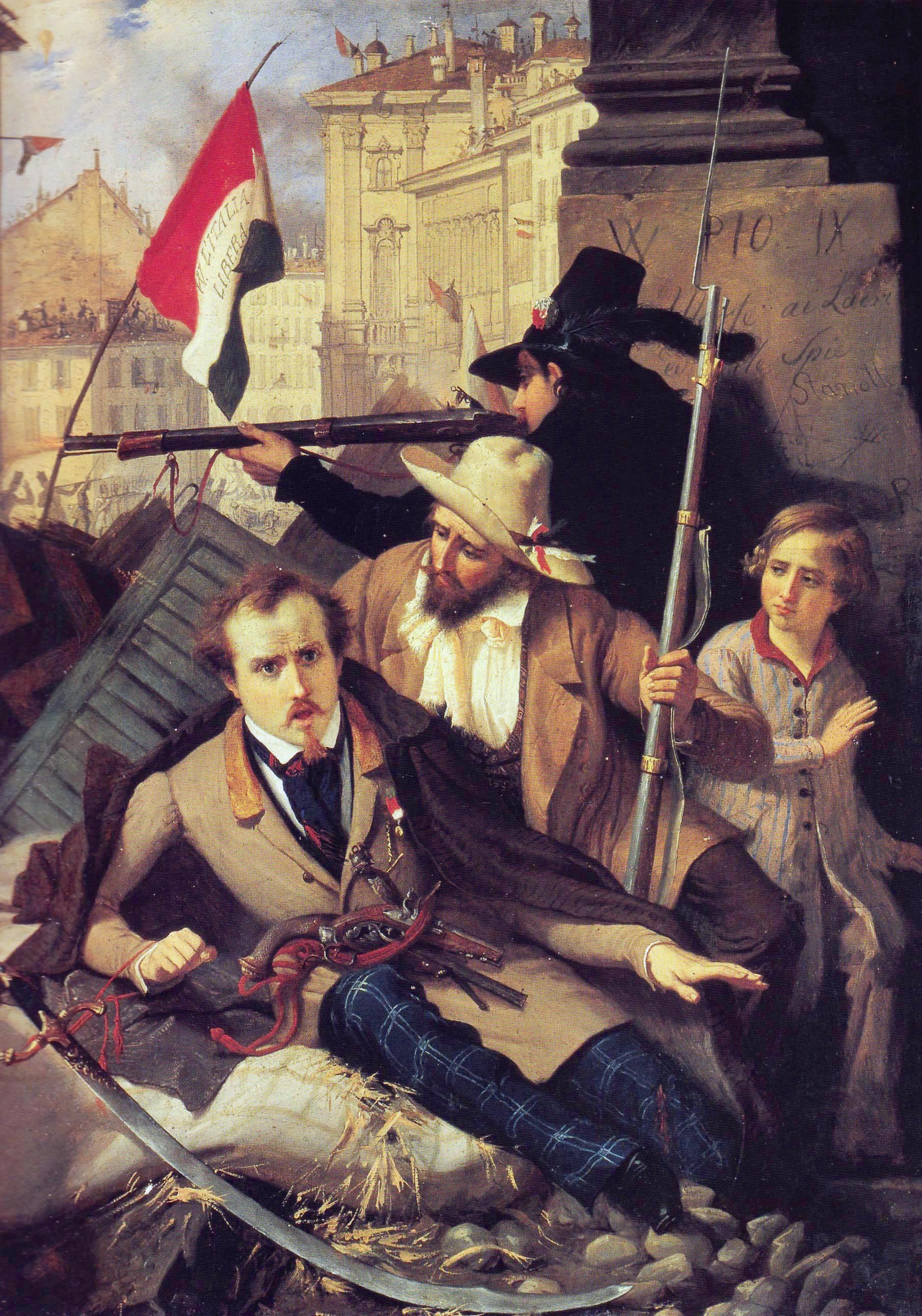
Episode from the Five Days of Milan, painting by Baldassare Verazzi

The first of the numerous revolutions to occur in 1848 in Italy came in Palermo, Sicily, starting in January 1848. There had been several previous revolts against Bourbon rule; this one produced an independent state that lasted only 16 months before the Bourbons were restored to the throne. During those months, the constitution was quite advanced for its time in liberal democratic terms, as was the proposal of a unified Italian confederation of states. The revolt's failure was reversed 12 years later as the Bourbon Kingdom of the Two Sicilies collapsed in 1860–61 with the unification of Italy.

On 11 February 1848, Leopold II of Tuscany, first cousin of Emperor Ferdinand I of Austria, granted the Constitution, with the general approval of his subjects. The Habsburg example was followed by Charles Albert of Sardinia (Albertine Statute; later became the constitution of the unified Kingdom of Italy and remained in force, with changes, until 1948) and by Pope Pius IX (Fundamental Statute). However, only King Charles Albert maintained the statute even after the end of the riots. Revolts broke out throughout the Kingdom of Lombardy–Venetia, such as the Five Days of Milan, which marked the beginning of the First Italian War of Independence.

After declaring independence from the Habsburg Austrian Empire, the Republic of San Marco later joined the Kingdom of Sardinia in an attempt, led by the latter, to unite northern Italy against foreign (mainly Austrian but also French) domination. However, the First Italian War of Independence ended in the defeat of Sardinia, and Austrian forces reconquered the Republic of San Marco on 28 August 1849 following a long siege. Based on the Venetian Lagoon, the Republic of San Marco extended into most of Venetia, or the Terraferma territory of the Republic of Venice, suppressed 51 years earlier in the French Revolutionary Wars.

In the Duchy of Modena and Reggio, Duke Francis V attempted to respond militarily to the first attempts at armed revolt, but faced with the approach of Bolognese volunteers to support the insurgents, to avoid bloodshed, he preferred to leave the city, promising a constitution and amnesties. On 21 March 1848, he left for Bolzano. A provisional government was established in Modena. In the Papal States, an internal revolt ousted Pope Pius IX from his temporal powers and led to the establishment of the Roman Republic.

The municipalities of Menton and Roquebrune united and obtained independence from the Principality of Monaco, becoming a protectorate of the Kingdom of Sardinia, and would eventually join Sardinia in 1861.

=== France ===
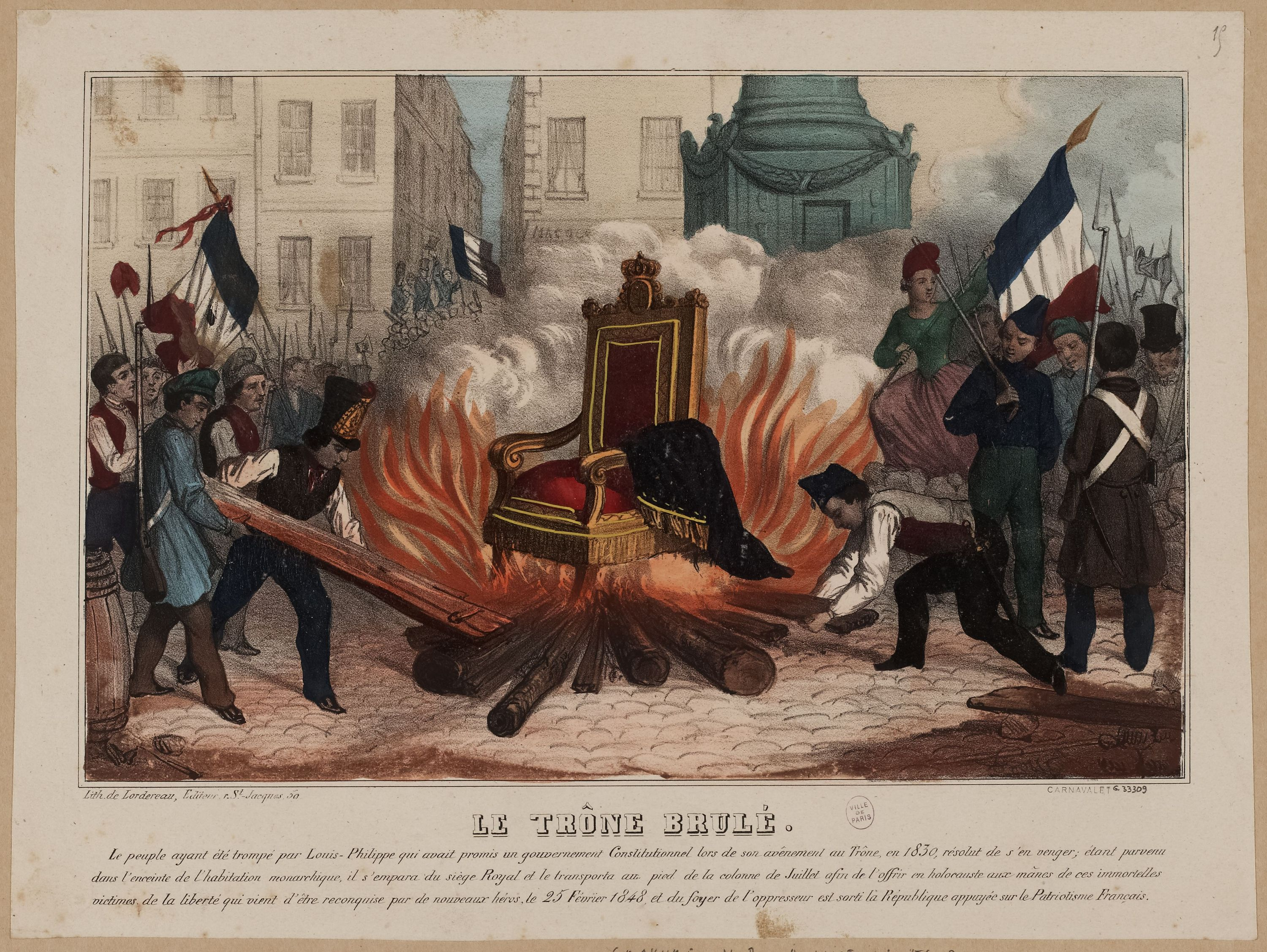
The symbolic burning of the throne of Louis Philippe I on the Place de la Bastille. On the throne was inscribed: "The People of Paris to All Europe: Liberty, Equality, Fraternity. 24 February 1848"

The revolution against the July Monarchy in France began after the banning of the campagne des banquets, held to advocate for an expansion of the electoral franchise and to protest the conservative government of François Guizot. Protests began on 22 February in Paris, led largely by workers and students, and quickly escalated into a revolution, especially after the army's massacre of 65 demonstrators on 23 February. The revolution culminated on 24 February, when King Louis Philippe I abdicated and fled the country.

With the fall of the July Monarchy, a provisional government was formed, consisting of a coalition of moderate republicans and socialists, and the French Second Republic was proclaimed. Shortly after taking power, the provisional government instituted universal manhood suffrage and abolished slavery and the death penalty. To placate labour unrest, it recognized the right to work and established the publicly-run national workshops (ateliers nationaux) for the unemployed. Louis Blanc, a socialist member of the provisional government, was appointed to lead the Luxembourg Commission, (Note: Named for its meeting place, Luxembourg Palace in Paris) consisting of workers' delegates, to investigate economic reforms to address the social question. Some actions proved unpopular in the provinces, such as the "commissioners of the republic" appointed as part of the regime change, whose conduct was criticized as dictatorial, and the 45 percent increase in the property tax to pay for the government's growing expenses.

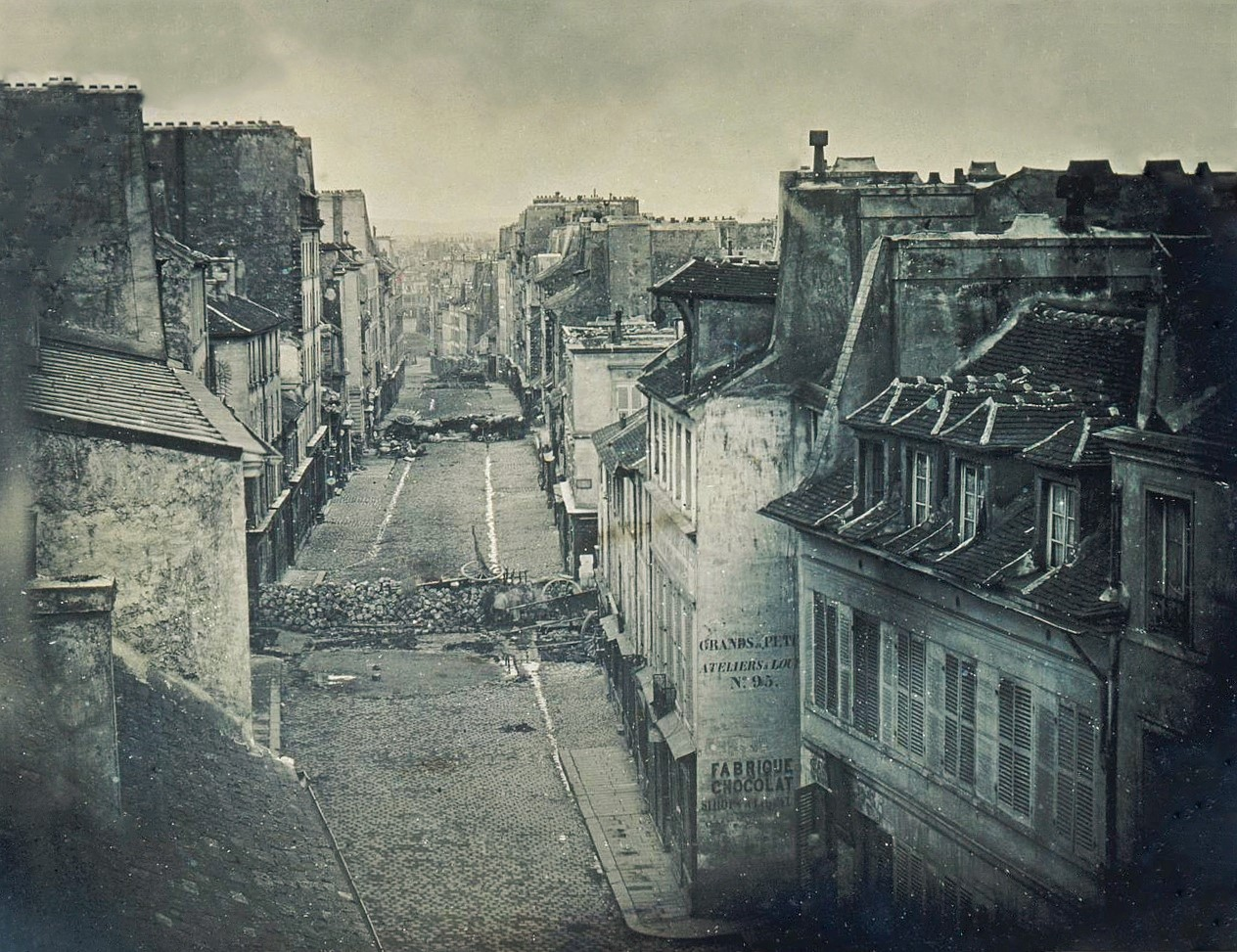
Barricades on rue Saint-Maur-Popincourt on 25 June 1848, during the June Days uprising. This is the first photograph of a barricade.

The Constituent Assembly elections on 23 April returned a conservative majority, and the provisional government was replaced by the more moderate Executive Commission, which largely excluded socialists. After the demonstration of 15 May, the Executive Commission, under pressure from the Assembly, moved to close the national workshops. Conservatives criticized the workshops as an unproductive waste of public funds, and viewed the growing number of workers in Paris as a source of revolt. With the closure of the workshops, workers would be conscripted into the army or sent home if they refused. Facing possible destitution, workers launched the June Days uprising between 22 and 26 June, involving 40,000 to 50,000 insurgents in violent barricade fighting across Paris. The uprising was suppressed by General Louis-Eugène Cavaignac, who was made France's head of state after the Executive Commission resigned on 24 June.

The first French presidential elections were held on 10 December after the adoption of the French Constitution of 1848 on 14 November. The two leading candidates were Cavaignac and Louis Napoléon Bonaparte, the nephew of Napoleon, who returned from exile in England after winning in by-elections to the Constituent Assembly in September. In the presidential election, Bonaparte won in a landslide victory with 75 percent of the vote. Bonaparte appealed to a broad coalition, consisting of conservatives, who assumed he would be easily influenced and could maintain order; peasants, who resented the government for the tax increases issued earlier in the year, and among whom he could count on name recognition; and urban workers, who opposed Cavaignac for his role in the June Days.

The revolution in France finally ended in December 1851, when Bonaparte launched a coup d'état to remain in office, as he was limited to a single term and failed to gain support for a constitutional amendment allowing him to run again. The coup met little resistance except in the provinces, where the left-wing "Republican Solidarity" organization, with 100,000 members, led a failed uprising. The following year, Bonaparte crowned himself as emperor of the Second French Empire, taking the name Napoleon III.

=== German states ===
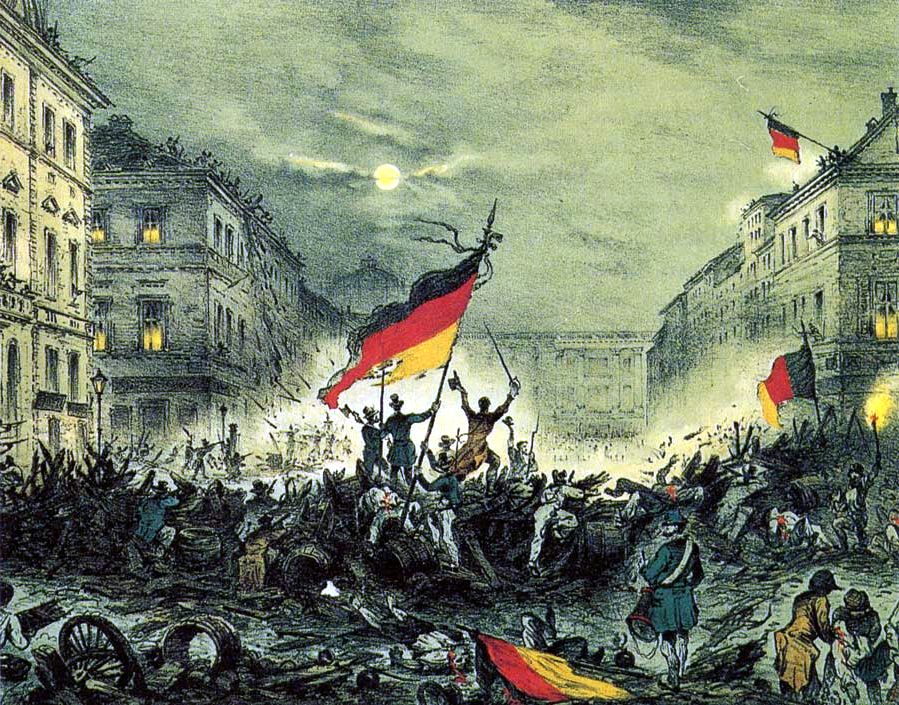
Revolutionaries in Berlin on the night of 18–19 March, flying the flag of Germany

The success of the revolution in France provided the impetus for the German revolutions. The first revolutionary events were in southwestern Germany, with popular demonstrations in Baden beginning on 27 February, followed by the rest of the small- to medium-sized German states. (Note: The Grand Duchy of Hesse, Electorate of Hesse, Duchy of Nassau, Kingdom of Hanover, Kingdom of Württemberg, Kingdom of Bavaria, Kingdom of Saxony, Grand Duchy of Oldenburg and Duchy of Brunswick, and in the Prussian Rhine Province and Province of Silesia.) Across Germany, the ubiquitous "March demands" (Märzforderungen) were issued, which called for, among other things, the immediate formation of a German national parliament. Weeks later, the revolution spread to the Austrian capital of Vienna from 13 to 15 March and the Prussian capital of Berlin from 18 to 19 March, and was successful in both.

At the initiative of middle-class reformers, the German states agreed to hold elections under universal manhood suffrage for a national parliament. The Frankfurt National Assembly sat for the first time on 18 May, with the task of drafting a German constitution. It appointed the "Provisional Central Power" to act as a national government, with Archduke John of Austria as Imperial Regent. As the Assembly and the Central Power had no means of enforcing its authority, it relied on the cooperation of the German states, particularly Austria and Prussia, and their tenuous recognition of the Assembly's legitimacy.

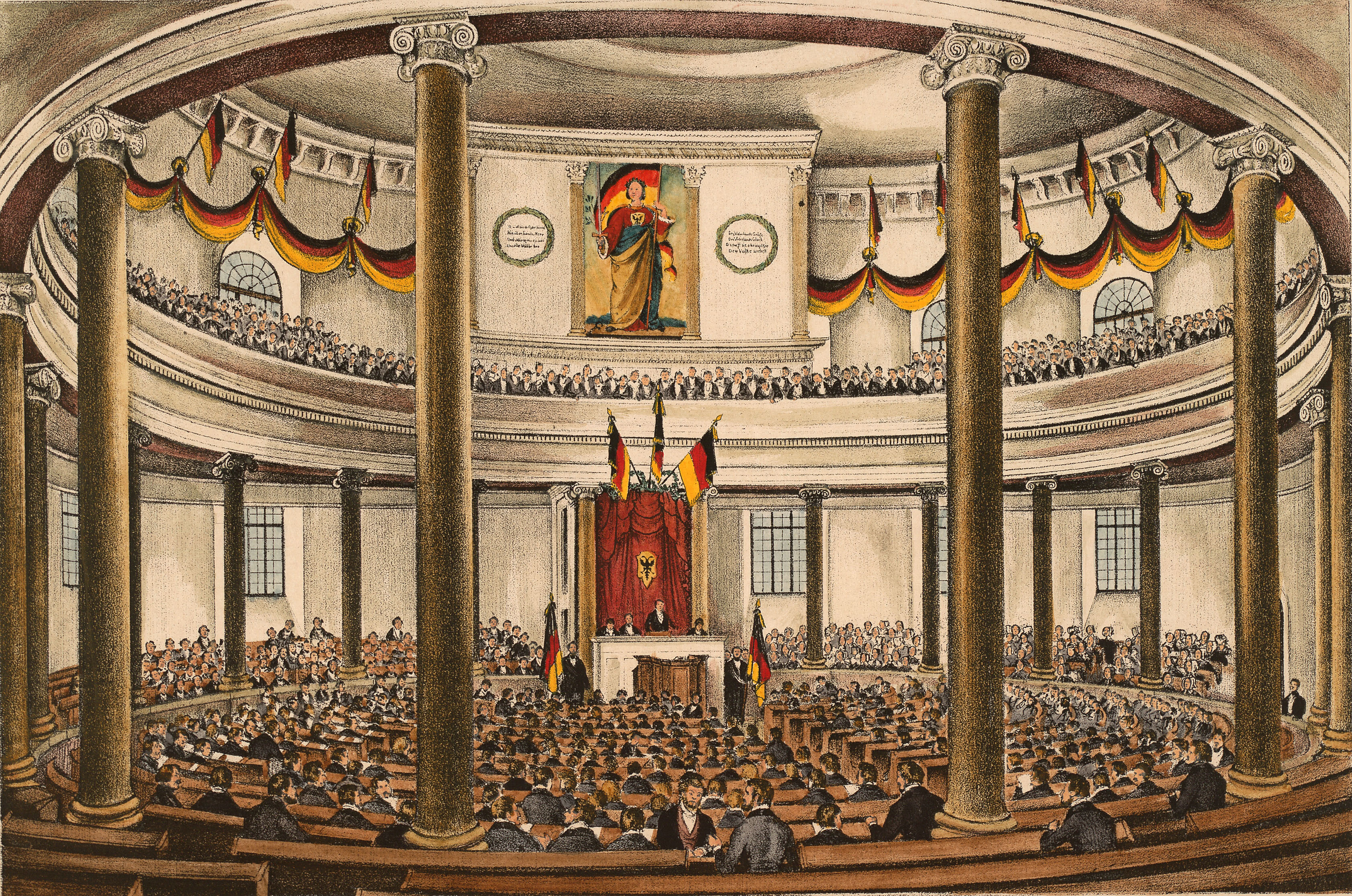
Opening of the Frankfurt National Assembly, the first German national parliament, in the Paulskirche with Germania hanging above

Division and sometimes violent conflict between liberals and radicals over numerous issues characterized the German revolutions from their onset. One immediate point of contention was whether Germany should be a republic or a constitutional monarchy; the "pre-parliament" had voted to support the latter, leading to the Hecker uprising in Baden by the radical republicans Friedrich Hecker and Gustav Struve in April 1848. The reliance of the liberal Frankfurt National Assembly and Central Power on the states to suppress radical uprisings, such as in April, worsened divisions and demonstrated the weakness of the national government. Another major point of contention was the "national question" of German unification. This included whether the German nation should include Austria (the "German question"), and whether it should include non-German lands. Conflicts between Germans and other nationalities occurred in Bohemia against Czechs, Posen (now Poznań) against Poles (in the Greater Poland uprising), and Schleswig–Holstein against Danes (in the First Schleswig War).

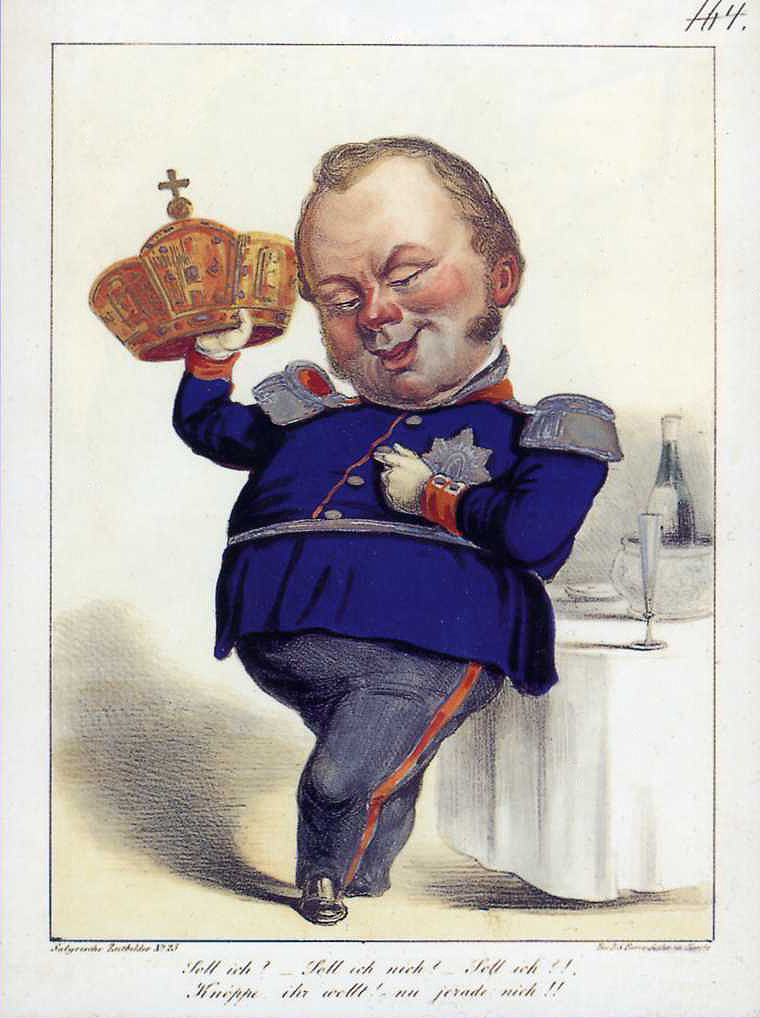
Cariacature of Frederick William IV, satirizing his rejection of the imperial crown offered by the Frankfurt National Assembly; he privately likened the crown to "a dog collar, binding [him] to the revolution of '48'".

In March 1849, despite divisions between liberals and radicals, the Frankfurt National Assembly concluded its work, presenting the Frankfurt Constitution for the German Empire. Under the new constitution, the empire would be governed as a federal constitutional monarchy with significant democratic concessions, including universal manhood suffrage and the protection of minority rights, and ruled by the King of Prussia as hereditary Emperor of the Germans. Austria, emboldened by the success of its counter-revolution, was excluded due to its insistence that all Habsburg territory and its multitude of non-German peoples be incorporated into the empire, threatening to upend the German nation-state. Frederick William IV of Prussia ultimately rejected the crown, as he did not recognize the authority of the Frankfurt National Assembly, and also rejected the constitution, believing, under the divine right of kings, that his rule could not be restricted by one.

The rejection of the imperial crown led to the Imperial Constitution campaign, the final act of the German revolutions. Uprisings again broke out across Germany in May 1849 in an effort to force the implementation of the constitution on the German states. The uprisings had wide support among radicalized workers, bourgeoisie, and soldiers, who were coordinated by highly-developed political organizations. Compared to the regular armies they faced, however, the revolutionaries were poorly armed and organized, and were quickly defeated in combat. The uprising in Baden endured the longest, owing to significant support among the troops. It finally capitulated on 23 July 1849, marking the end of the revolutions in Germany.

=== Denmark ===
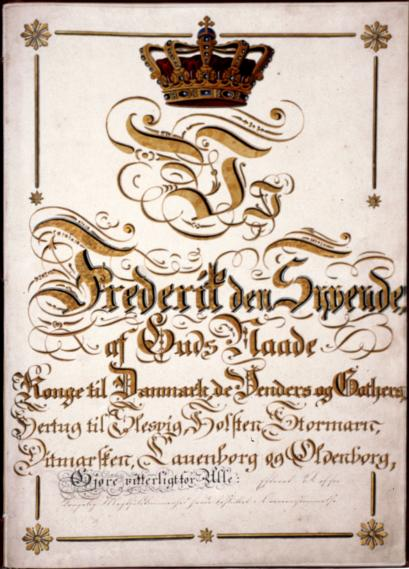
Cover of the first Danish constitution from 1849.

Denmark had been governed by a system of absolute monarchy (King's Law) since the 17th century. King Christian VIII, a moderate reformer but still an absolutist, died in January 1848 during a period of rising opposition from farmers and liberals. The demands for a constitutional monarchy, led by the National Liberals, ended with a popular march to Christiansborg on 21 March. The new king, Frederick VII, met the liberals' demands and installed a new Cabinet that included prominent leaders of the National Liberal Party.

The national-liberal movement wanted to abolish absolutism, but retain a strongly centralized state. The king accepted a new constitution, agreeing to share power with a bicameral parliament called the Rigsdag. It is said that the Danish king's first words after signing away his absolute power were, "that was nice, now I can sleep in the mornings". Although army officers were dissatisfied, they accepted the new arrangement. In contrast to the rest of Europe, this was not overturned by reactionaries. The liberal constitution did not extend to Schleswig, leaving the Schleswig-Holstein Question unanswered.

==== Schleswig ====
The Duchy of Schleswig, a region containing both Danes (a North Germanic population) and Germans (a West Germanic population), was a part of the Danish monarchy, but remained a duchy separate from the Kingdom of Denmark. Spurred by pan-Germanist sentiment, the Germans of Schleswig took up arms against a proposal from the National Liberal government in Copenhagen, which would have fully integrated the duchy into Denmark.

The German population in Schleswig and Holstein revolted, inspired by the Protestant clergy. The German states sent in an army, but Danish victories in 1849 led to the Treaty of Berlin (1850) and the London Protocol (1852). They reaffirmed the sovereignty of the King of Denmark, while prohibiting union with Denmark. The violation of the latter provision led to renewed warfare in 1863 and the Prussian victory in 1864.

=== Habsburg monarchy ===
Cartoon depicting the political situation in the Austrian Empire on the eve of the Prague uprising; east and west have been reversed

From March 1848 through July 1849, the Habsburg Austrian Empire was threatened by revolutionary movements, which often had a nationalist character. The empire, ruled from Vienna, included German-speaking Austrians, Hungarians, Czechs, Poles, Croats, Ukrainians, Romanians, Rusyns, Slovaks, Slovenes, Serbs and Italians, all of whom attempted in the course of the revolution to achieve either autonomy, independence, or even hegemony over other nationalities. The nationalist picture was further complicated by the simultaneous events in the German states, which moved toward greater German national unity.

On 15 April, Emperor Ferdinand I declared himself a "constitutional monarch", despite there not yet being a constitution. He charged Baron Franz von Pillersdorf with drafting one, and it was passed on 25 April 1848. This constitution, called the Pillersdorf Constitution, applied to the whole of the Habsburg monarchy, except for Hungary. The constitution established the Reichstag, a short-lived unicameral parliamentary body. The Reichstag had two goals: to reform the feudal system and to draft a new constitution. It succeeded in its first goal, abolishing serfdom by a patent issued together with the Emperor on 7 September 1848. This was followed by further land reform in the Austrian Empire.

In the midst of its work, the Reichstag was relocated to Kroměříž (German: Kremsier) in Moravia due to the Vienna Uprising in October 1848. The Reichstag was due to present its liberal constitution, the Kremsier Constitution, on the anniversary of the revolution in 1849, but the abdication of Ferdinand I in favor of his more conservative nephew Franz Joseph I in December 1848 prevented such. As the revolutions came to an end in Europe, the Austrian army dissolved the Reichstag on 7 March 1849, and the imperial government promulgated the March Constitution, which strengthened the powers of the emperor.

==== Hungary ====
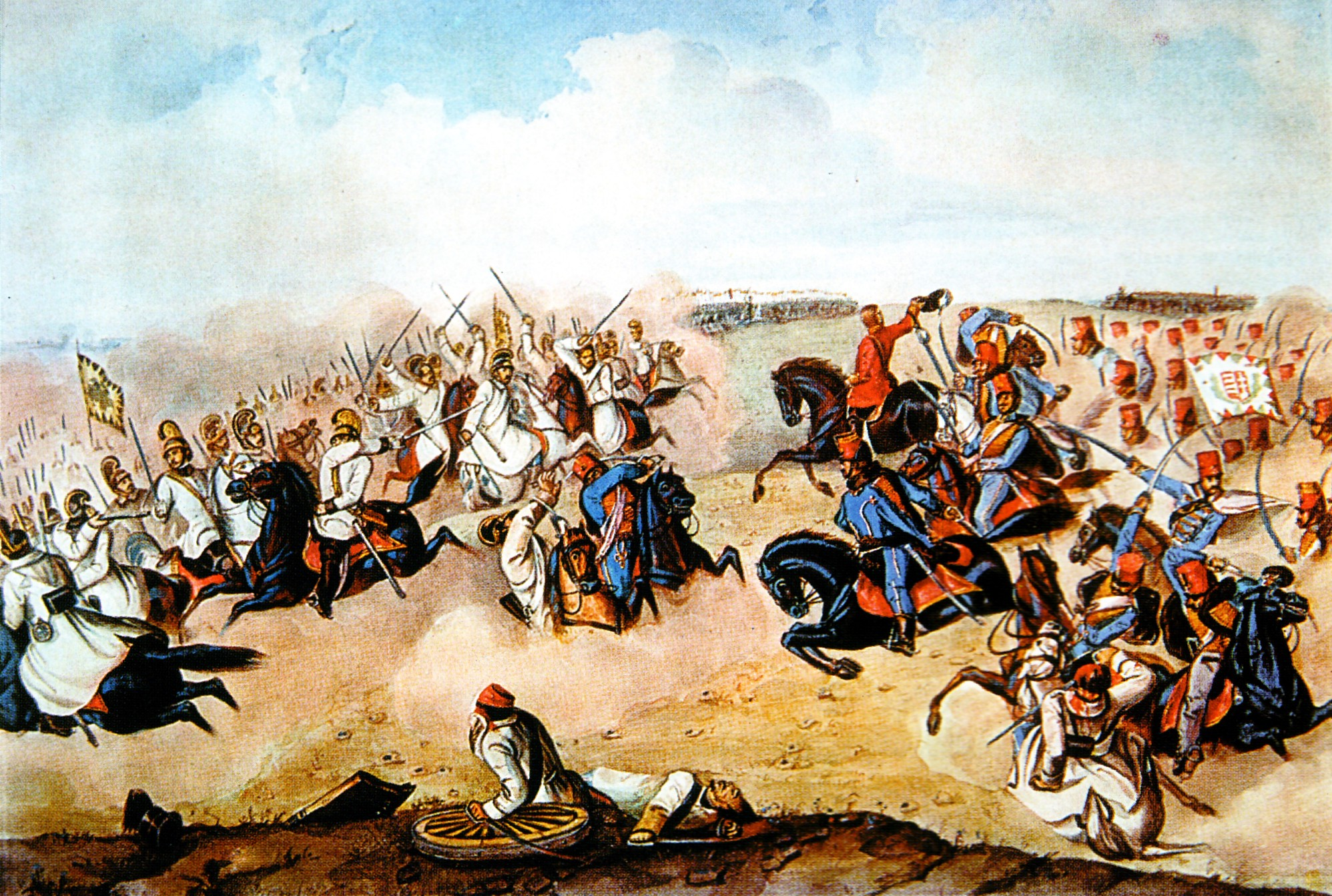
Hungarian hussars in battle during the Hungarian Revolution

The Hungarian Revolution of 1848 was the longest in Europe, crushed in August 1849 by the Austrian and Russian armies. Nevertheless, it had a major effect in freeing the serfs. It began on 15 March 1848, when Hungarian patriots organized mass demonstrations in Pest and Buda (today Budapest) which forced the imperial governor to accept their 12 points of demands. The 12 points included demands for freedom of the press, an independent Hungarian ministry residing in Buda–Pest and responsible to a popularly elected parliament, the formation of a National Guard, complete civil and religious equality, trial by jury, a national bank, a Hungarian army, the withdrawal of foreign (Austrian) troops from Hungary, the freeing of political prisoners, and union with Transylvania. On that morning, the demands were read aloud along with poetry by Sándor Petőfi with the simple lines of "We swear by the God of the Hungarians; we swear, we shall be slaves no more". Lajos Kossuth and other liberal nobles in the Hungarian Diet appealed to the Habsburg court with demands for representative government and civil liberties. These events resulted in Klemens von Metternich, the Austrian chancellor and foreign minister, resigning. The demands of the Diet were agreed upon on 18 March by Emperor Ferdinand I. Although Hungary would remain part of the monarchy through personal union with the emperor, a constitutional government would be founded. The Diet then passed the April laws that established equality before the law, a legislature, a hereditary constitutional monarchy, and an end to the transfer and restrictions of land use.

The revolution grew into a war for independence from the Habsburg monarchy when Josip Jelačić, Ban of Croatia, crossed the border to restore their control. The new government, led by Lajos Kossuth, was initially successful against the Habsburg forces. Although Hungary took a national united stand for its freedom, some minorities of the Kingdom of Hungary, including the Serbs of Vojvodina, the Romanians of Transylvania, and some Slovaks of Upper Hungary, supported the Habsburg Emperor and fought against the Hungarian Revolutionary Army. Eventually, after one and a half years of fighting, the revolution was crushed when Russian Tsar Nicholas I marched into Hungary with over 300,000 troops. As a result of the defeat, Hungary was thus placed under brutal martial law. The leading rebels like Kossuth went into exile or were executed, the latter including former prime minister Batthyány and the Thirteen Martyrs of Arad. In the long run, the passive resistance following the revolution, along with the crushing Austrian defeat in the 1866 Austro-Prussian War, led to the Austro-Hungarian Compromise (1867), which marked the start of the Austro-Hungarian Empire.

==== Galicia ====
The center of the Ukrainian national movement was in Galicia, which is today divided between Ukraine and Poland. On 19 April 1848, a group of representatives led by the Greek Catholic clergy launched a petition to the Austrian Emperor. It expressed wishes that in those regions of Galicia where the Ruthenian (Ukrainian) population represented the majority, the Ukrainian language should be taught at schools and used to announce official decrees for the peasantry; local officials were expected to understand it and the Ruthenian clergy was to be equalized in their rights with the clergy of all other denominations.

On 2 May 1848, the Supreme Ruthenian Council was established. The council (1848–1851) was headed by the Greek-Catholic Bishop Gregory Yakhimovich and consisted of 30 permanent members. Its main goal was the administrative division of Galicia into Western (Polish) and Eastern (Ruthenian/Ukrainian) parts within the borders of the Habsburg Empire, and formation of a separate region with a political self-governance.

Though both Polish and Ruthenian Galicians had nationalist aspirations, the two groups' interests diverged, with Polish nobles in Ruthenia often having dominion over Ruthenian serfs. Emperor Ferdinand responded to Galician agitation in 1848 by freeing the predominantly Ruthenian serfs, thereby dampening the revolutionary ardor of both groups.

==== Czech lands ====
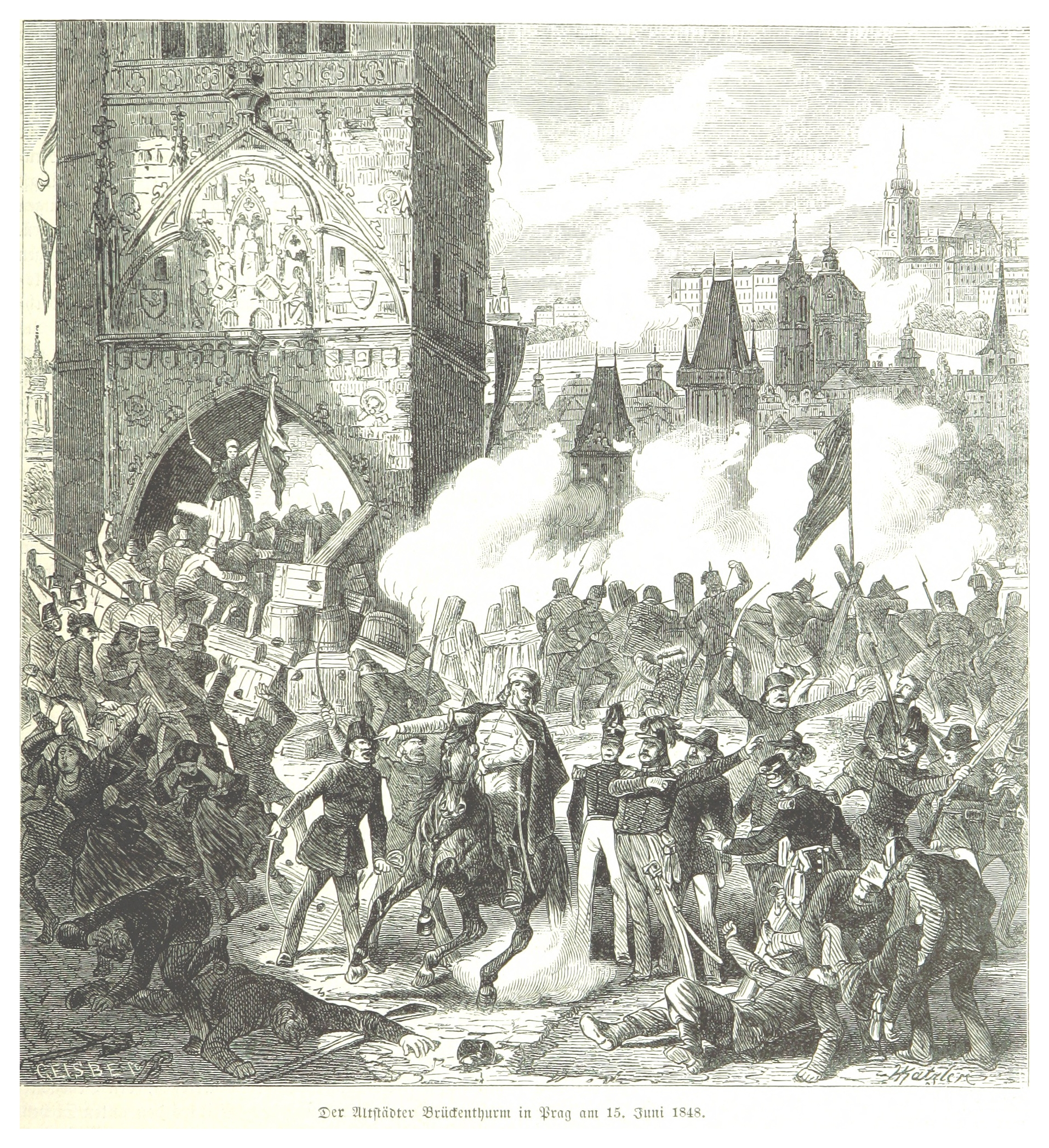
The June Uprising of 1848 in Prague injected a strong political element into Czech National Revival.

The revolution of 1848 in Bohemia began with the drafting of a list of liberal demands of the Czech population of the Czech lands at the St. Wenceslas Spa in Prague by the wealthier inhabitants of the city in March. These were spurred by the more violent events in Vienna and the news of revolutions sweeping across the continent.

The revolution in the Czech lands was complicated by the friction between German Bohemians, who were interested in becoming a part of Germany and representation in the Frankfurt National Assembly, the first all-German parliament, and between Czechs in Bohemia and Moravia, who sought Czech nationality. Austroslavism emerged during the revolutions, propagated by František Palacký, which sought to achieve greater autonomy for the Czech lands, and potentially even a federation, within the Habsburg monarchy, as opposed to potentially all of the Czech lands joining a unified greater Germany.

=== Switzerland ===
Switzerland, already an alliance of republics, also saw an internal struggle. The attempted secession of seven Catholic cantons to form an alliance known as the Sonderbund ("separate alliance", "special alliance") in 1845 led to a short civil conflict in November 1847 in which around 100 people were killed. The Sonderbund was decisively defeated by the Protestant cantons, which had a larger population. A new constitution of 1848 ended the almost-complete independence of the cantons, transforming Switzerland into a federal state.

=== Greater Poland ===
Polish people mounted a military insurrection against the Prussians in the Grand Duchy of Posen (or the Greater Poland region), a part of Prussia since its annexation in 1815. The Poles tried to establish a Polish political entity, but refused to cooperate with the Germans and the Jews. The Germans decided they were better off with the status quo, so they assisted the Prussian governments in recapturing control. In the long-term, the uprising stimulated nationalism among both the Poles and the Germans and brought civil equality to the Jews.

=== Romanian Principalities ===
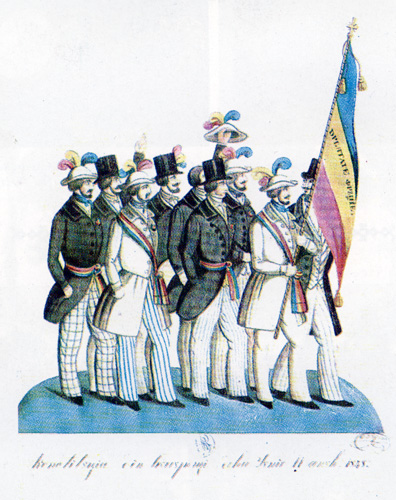
Romanian revolutionaries in Bucharest in 1848, carrying the Romanian tricolour

A Romanian liberal and Romantic nationalist uprising began in June in the principality of Wallachia. Its goals were administrative autonomy, abolition of serfdom, and popular self-determination. It was closely connected with the 1848 unsuccessful revolt in Moldavia, it sought to overturn the administration imposed by Imperial Russian authorities under the Regulamentul Organic regime, and, through many of its leaders, demanded the abolition of boyar privilege. Led by a group of young intellectuals and officers in the Wallachian military forces, the movement succeeded in toppling the ruling Prince Gheorghe Bibescu, whom it replaced with a provisional government and a regency, and in passing a series of major liberal reforms, first announced in the Proclamation of Islaz.

Despite its rapid gains and popular backing, the new administration was marked by conflicts between the radical wing and more conservative forces, especially over the issue of land reform. Two successive abortive coups weakened the new government, and its international status was always contested by Russia. After managing to rally a degree of sympathy from Ottoman political leaders, the Revolution was ultimately isolated by the intervention of Russian diplomats. In September 1848, by agreement with the Ottomans, Russia invaded and put down the revolution. According to Vasile Maciu, the failures were attributable in Wallachia to foreign intervention, in Moldavia to the opposition of the feudalists, and in Transylvania to the failure of the campaigns of General Józef Bem (who led a very successful campaign of liberation in the Hungarian Revolution), and later to Austrian repression. In later decades, the rebels returned and gained their goals.

=== Belgium ===
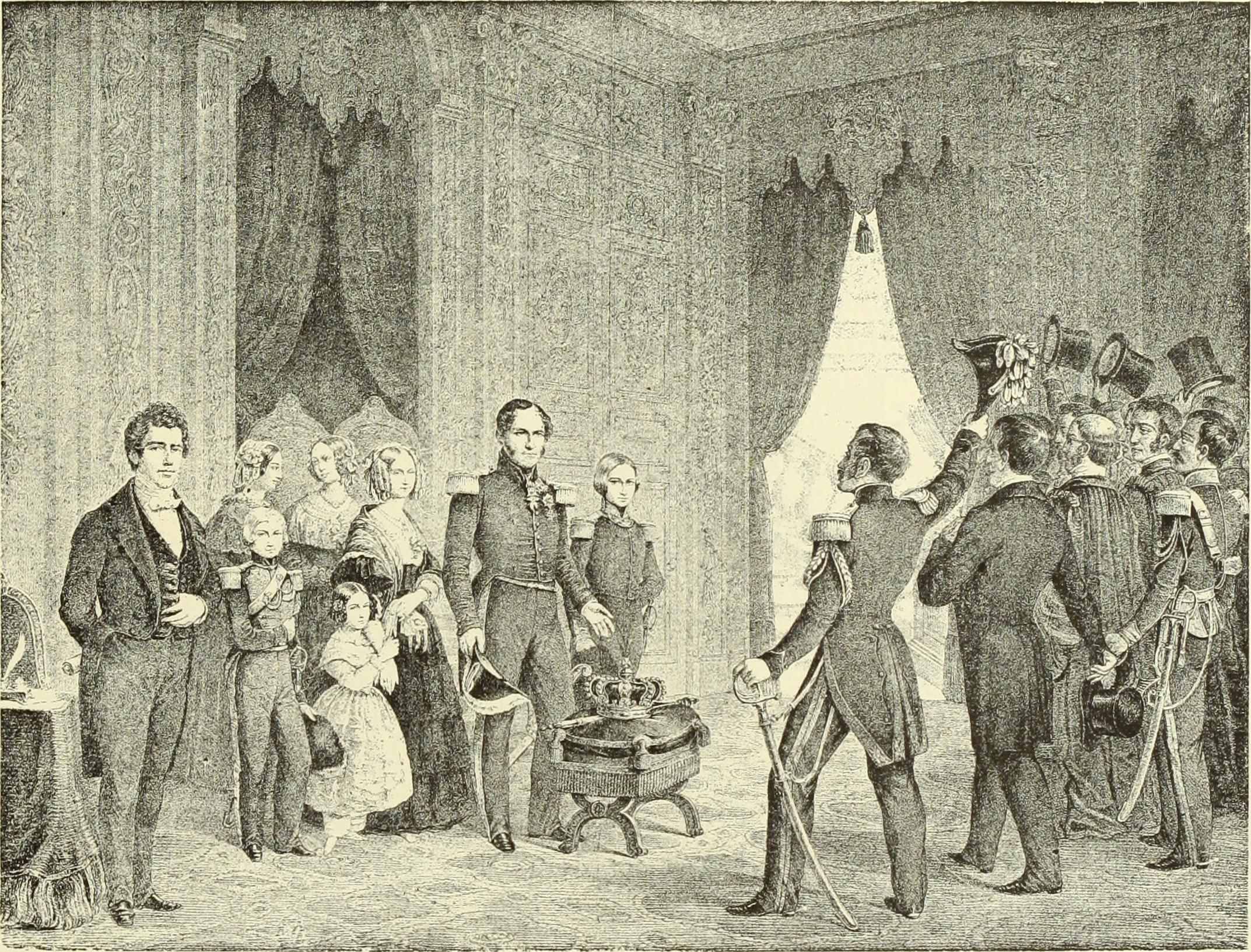
A depiction of Leopold I of Belgium's symbolic offer to resign the crown in 1848

Belgium did not see major unrest in 1848; it had already undergone a liberal reform after the Revolution of 1830, and thus its constitutional system and its monarchy survived.

Many small local riots broke out, concentrated in the sillon industriel industrial region of the provinces of Liège and Hainaut.

The most serious threat of revolutionary contagion, however, was posed by Belgian émigré groups from France. In 1830, the Belgian Revolution had broken out, inspired by the revolution occurring in France, and Belgian authorities feared that a similar 'copycat' phenomenon might occur in 1848. Shortly after the revolution in France, Belgian migrant workers living in Paris were encouraged to return to Belgium to overthrow the monarchy and establish a republic. Belgian authorities expelled Karl Marx himself from Brussels in early March on accusations of having used part of his inheritance to arm Belgian revolutionaries.

Around 6,000 armed émigrés of the "Belgian Legion" attempted to cross the Belgian frontier. There were two divisions that were formed. The first group, travelling by train, was stopped and quickly disarmed at Quiévrain on 26 March 1848. The second group crossed the border on 29 March and headed for Brussels. They were confronted by Belgian troops at the hamlet of Risquons-Tout and defeated. Several smaller groups managed to infiltrate Belgium, but the reinforced Belgian border troops succeeded, and the defeat at Risquons-Tout effectively ended the revolutionary threat to Belgium.

The situation in Belgium began to recover that summer after a good harvest, and fresh elections returned a strong majority to the governing party.

=== Ireland ===
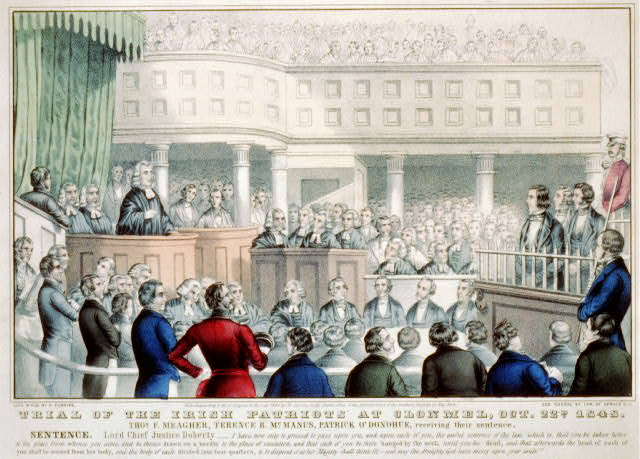
Young Irelanders receiving a death sentence at their trial in Clonmel

Previously a separate kingdom, Ireland was united with Great Britain to form the United Kingdom of Great Britain and Ireland on 1 January 1801. Although the Irish population was made up largely of rural Catholic agricultural workers, tensions arose from the political over-representation, in positions of power, of the Anglo-Irish, Protestant Ascendancy who were loyal to the union. From the 1810s onward, an Irish conservative-liberal movement led by Daniel O'Connell had sought to secure equal political rights for Catholics within the British political system, succeeding with the Roman Catholic Relief Act 1829. But as in other European states, a current inspired by Radicalism criticized Irish conservative-liberals for pursuing the aim of democratic equality with excessive compromise and gradualism.

In Ireland, a current of nationalist, egalitarian and radicalist republicanism, inspired by the French Revolution, had been present since the 1790s – being expressed initially in the Irish Rebellion of 1798. This tendency grew into a movement for social, cultural, and political reform during the 1830s, and in 1839 was realized into a political association called Young Ireland. It was initially not well received, but grew more popular with the Great Famine of 1845–1849, an event that brought catastrophic social effects and which threw into light the inadequate response of authorities. The spark for the Young Ireland rebellion came in 1848 when the British Parliament passed the Prevention of Crime (Ireland) Act 1848, which gave the Lord Lieutenant of Ireland the power to organise Ireland into districts and station the Irish Constabulary in each district at the latter's expense. The act also restricted the ownership of guns and required males between the ages of 16 and 60 to join a type of posse comitatus when called upon by district officials to assist in apprehending suspected murderers or else be guilty of a misdemeanour.

In response the Young Ireland Party launched a rebellion in July 1848, gathering landlords and tenants to its cause. But its first major engagement against police, in the village of Ballingarry, South Tipperary, was a failure. A long gunfight with around 50 policemen ended when police reinforcements arrived. After the arrest of the Young Ireland leaders, the rebellion collapsed, though intermittent fighting continued for the next year. It is sometimes called the Famine Rebellion (since it took place during the Great Famine).

=== Other European states ===
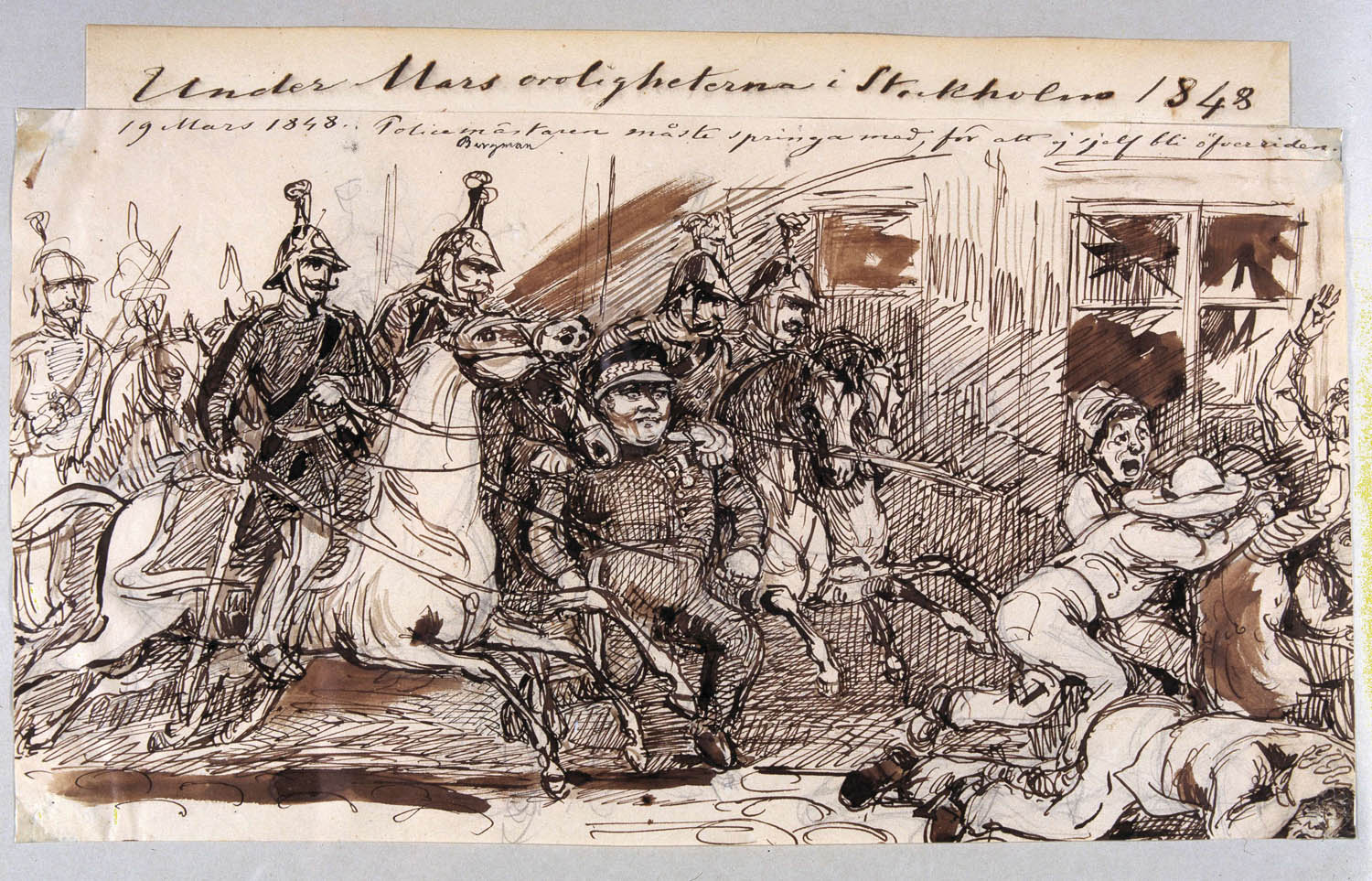
Illustration of the "March troubles" in Stockholm, Sweden in 1848

The United Kingdom, Belgium, the Netherlands, Portugal, the Russian Empire (including Poland and Finland), and the Ottoman Empire did not encounter major national or Radical revolutions in 1848. Sweden and Norway were also little affected. Serbia, though formally unaffected by the revolt as it was a part of the Ottoman state, actively supported Serbian revolutionaries in the Habsburg Empire.

In many countries, the absence of unrest was partly due to governments taking action to prevent revolutionary unrest and pre-emptively granting some of the reforms demanded by revolutionaries elsewhere. This was notably the case for the Netherlands, where King William II decided to alter the Dutch constitution to reform elections and voluntarily reduce the power of the monarchy. The same might be said of Switzerland, where a new constitutional regime was introduced in 1848: the Swiss Federal Constitution was a revolution of sorts, laying the foundation of Swiss society as it is today.

=== Other English-speaking countries ===
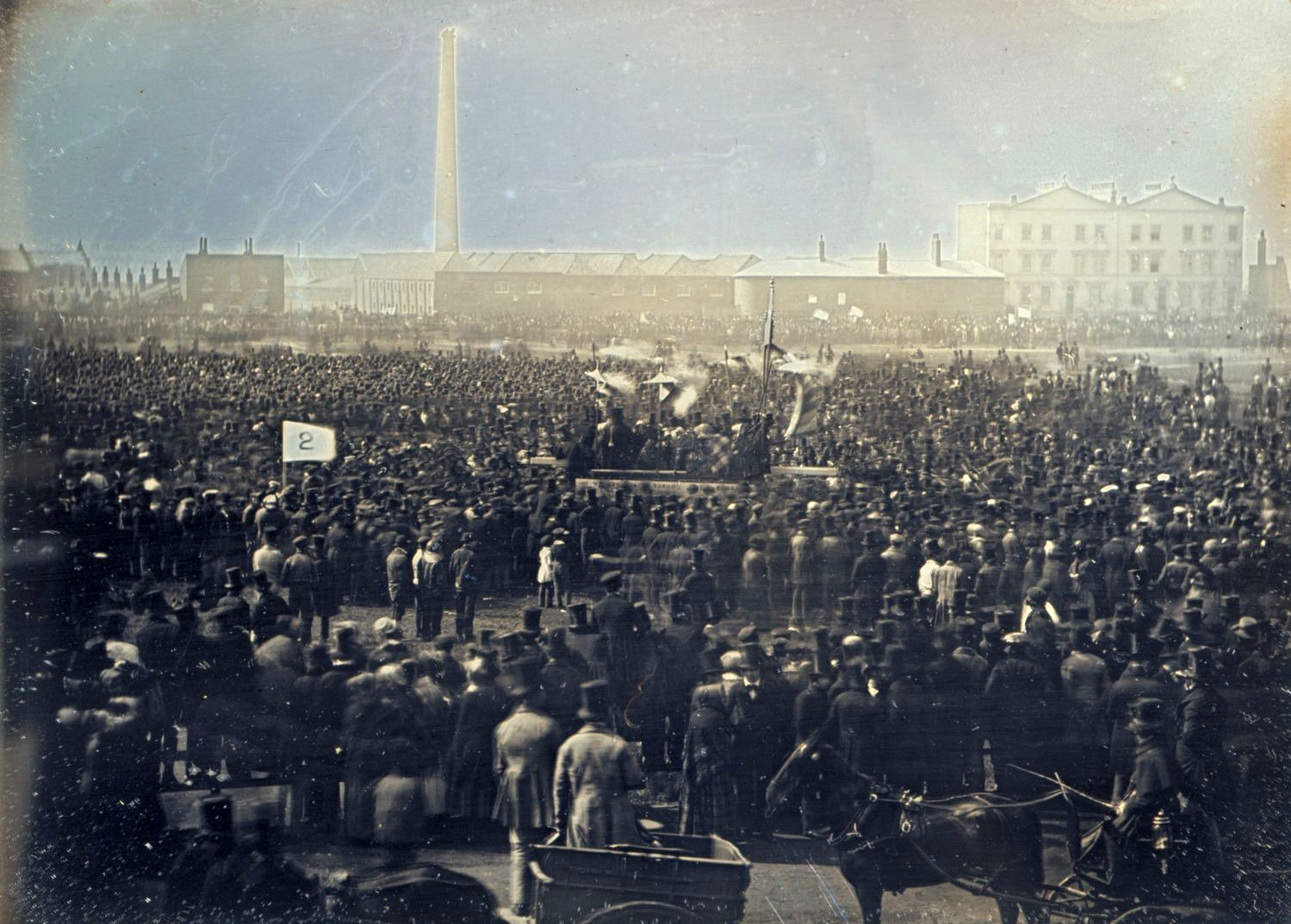
Chartist meeting on Kennington Common 10 April 1848

In the United Kingdom, while the middle classes had been pacified by their inclusion in the extension of the franchise in the Reform Act 1832, the consequential agitations, violence, and petitions of the Chartist movement came to a head with their peaceful petition to Parliament of 1848. The repeal in 1846 of the protectionist agricultural tariffs – called the "Corn Laws" – had defused some proletarian fervour.

In the Isle of Man, there were ongoing efforts to reform the self-elected House of Keys, but no revolution took place. Some of the reformers were encouraged by events in France in particular.

In the United States, opinions were polarized, with Democrats and reformers in favour, although they were distressed at the degree of violence involved. Opposition came from conservative elements, especially Whigs, southern slaveholders, orthodox Calvinists, and Catholics. About 4,000 German exiles arrived, and some became fervent Republicans in the 1850s, such as Carl Schurz. Kossuth toured America and won great applause, but no volunteers or diplomatic or financial help.

Following rebellions in 1837 and 1838, 1848 in Canada saw the establishment of responsible government in Nova Scotia and The Canadas, the first such governments in the British Empire outside the United Kingdom. John Ralston Saul has argued that this development is tied to the revolutions in Europe, but described the Canadian approach to the revolutionary year of 1848 as "talking their way ... out of the empire's control system and into a new democratic model", a stable democratic system which has lasted to the present day. Tory and Orange Order in Canada opposition to responsible government came to a head in riots triggered by the Rebellion Losses Bill in 1849. They succeeded in the burning of the Parliament Buildings in Montreal, but, unlike their counterrevolutionary counterparts in Europe, they were ultimately unsuccessful.

=== Latin America ===
In Spanish Latin America, the Revolution of 1848 appeared in New Granada, where Colombian students, liberals, and intellectuals demanded the election of General José Hilario López. He took power in 1849 and launched major reforms, abolishing slavery and the death penalty, and providing freedom of the press and of religion. The resulting turmoil in Colombia lasted three decades; from 1851 to 1885, the country was ravaged by four general civil wars and 50 local revolutions.

In Chile, the 1848 revolutions inspired the 1851 Chilean revolution.

In Brazil, the Praieira Revolt, a movement in Pernambuco, lasted from November 1848 to 1852. Unresolved conflicts from the period of the regency and local resistance to the consolidation of the Empire of Brazil that had been proclaimed in 1822 helped to plant the seeds of the revolution.

In Mexico, the Centralist Republic led by Antonio López de Santa Anna lost half of its territory to the United States, including California and Texas, in the Mexican–American War of 1845–1848. Derived from this catastrophe and chronic stability problems, the Liberal Party started a reformist movement. This movement, via elections, led liberals to formulate the Plan of Ayutla. The Plan written in 1854 aimed at removing President Santa Anna from control of Mexico during the Second Federal Republic of Mexico period. Initially, it seemed little different from other political plans of the era, but it is considered the first act of the Liberal Reform in Mexico. It was the catalyst for revolts in many parts of Mexico, which led to the resignation of Santa Anna from the presidency, never to vie for office again. The next Presidents of Mexico were the liberals, Juan Álvarez, Ignacio Comonfort, and Benito Juárez. The new regime would then proclaim the 1857 Mexican Constitution, which implemented a variety of liberal reforms. Among other things, these reforms confiscated religious property, aimed to promote economic development, and to stabilize a nascent republican government. The reforms led directly to the so-called Three Years War or Reform War of 1857. The liberals won this war, but the conservatives solicited the French Government of Napoleon III for a European, conservative Monarch, deriving into the Second French intervention in Mexico. Under the puppet Habsburg government of Maximilian I of Mexico, the country became a client state of France (1863–1867).

=== Southeast Asia ===
In the Dutch East Indies, a group of up to six hundred Indo people occupied the Harmonie Club in Batavia in May 1848 to protest against their exclusion from upper-rank colonial posts. Administrators feared the liberal demonstration would spread to the region's Javanese or Chinese and even grow into an independence movement, and the organizers behind the protest were fired and banned from Java entirely.

== Aftermath and legacy ==
We have been beaten and humiliated ... scattered, imprisoned, disarmed, and gagged. The fate of European democracy has slipped from our hands.

— Pierre-Joseph Proudhon

Liberal democrats looked to 1848 as a democratic revolution, which in the long run ensured liberty, equality, and fraternity. For nationalists, 1848 was the springtime of hope, when newly emerging nationalities rejected the old multinational empires, but the results were not as comprehensive as many had hoped. Communists denounced 1848 as a betrayal of working-class ideals by a bourgeoisie indifferent to the legitimate demands of the proletariat. The view of the revolutions of 1848 as a bourgeois revolution is also common in non-Marxist scholarship. Tensions over differing approaches between bourgeois revolutionaries and radicals played a major role in the failure of the revolutions. Many governments engaged in a partial reversal of the revolutionary reforms of 1848–1849 as well as heightened repression and censorship. The Hanoverian nobility successfully appealed to the Confederal Diet in 1851 over the loss of their noble privileges, while the Prussian Junkers recovered their manorial police powers from 1852 to 1855. In the Austrian Empire, the Sylvester Patents (1851) discarded Franz Stadion's constitution and the Statute of Basic Rights, while the number of arrests in Habsburg territories increased from 70,000 in 1850 to one million by 1854. Nicholas I's rule in Russia after 1848 was particularly repressive, marked by an expansion of the secret police (the Tretiye Otdeleniye) and stricter censorship; more Russians were working for censorship organs than actual books published in the period immediately after 1848. In France, the works of Charles Baudelaire, Victor Hugo, Alexandre Ledru-Rollin, and Pierre-Joseph Proudhon were confiscated.

In the post-revolutionary decade after 1848, little had visibly changed, and many historians considered the revolutions a failure, given the seeming lack of permanent structural changes. More recently, Christopher Clark has characterized the period that followed 1848 as one dominated by a revolution in government. Governments after 1848 were forced into managing the public sphere and popular sphere with more effectiveness, resulting in the increased prominence of, for example, the Prussian Zentralstelle für Pressangelegenheiten (Central Press Agency, established 1850), the Austrian Zensur-und polizeihofstelle (Censorship and Police Office), and the French Direction Générale de la Librairie (1856). The conservative Prussian prime minister Otto von Manteuffel declared that the state could no longer be run like the landed estate of a nobleman. Meanwhile, centrist coalitions, consisting of liberals and conservatives united in their anxiety toward working-class socialism, also took power after the revolutions, such as the Connubio coalition led by Camillo Benso, Count of Cavour in Piedmont–Sardinia. Priscilla Robertson considered many of the revolutionaries' goals to have been achieved by the 1870s, though largely by the enemies of the revolutions. Austria and Prussia eliminated feudalism by 1850 and Russia abolished serfdom in 1861, improving conditions for the peasants. The European middle classes made political and economic gains over the next 20 years, with France retaining the universal male suffrage that had been established by the Second Republic. The Austrian Empire was reorganized into the Dual Monarchy, according Hungary more self-determination as part of the Ausgleich of 1867, a process that was spearheaded by the former revolutionaries Gyula Andrássy and Ferenc Deák.

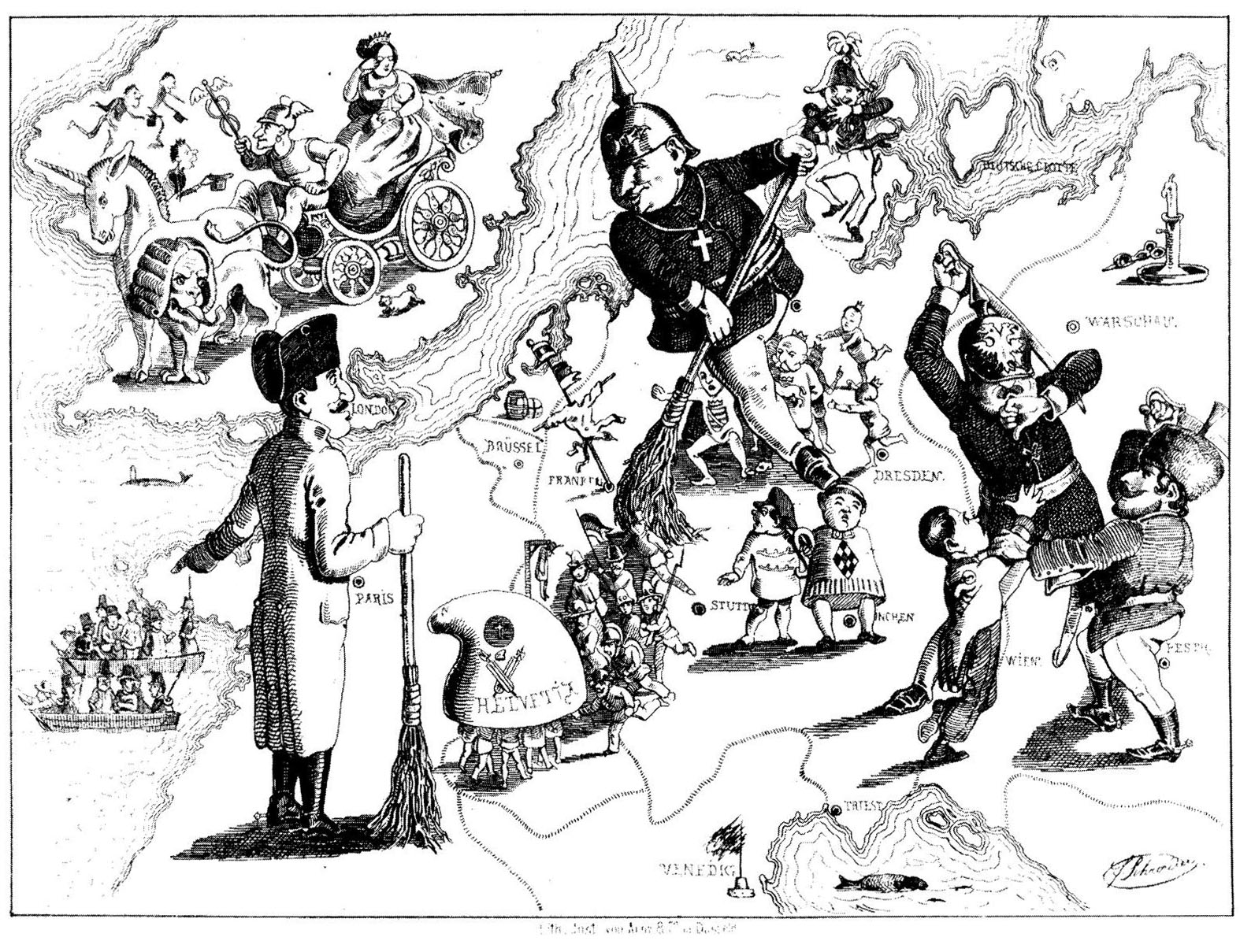
A caricature by Ferdinand Schröder on the defeat of the revolutions of 1848–1849 in Europe (published in Düsseldorfer Monatshefte, August 1849)

Karl Marx expressed disappointment at the bourgeois character of the revolutions. Marx elaborated in his 1850 "Address of the Central Committee to the Communist League" a theory of permanent revolution according to which the proletariat should strengthen democratic bourgeois revolutionary forces until the proletariat itself is ready to seize power.

German historian Reinhard Rürup described the 1848 revolutions as a turning point in the development of modern antisemitism. This was expressed through the development of conspiracies that presented Jews as representative of both the forces of social revolution (apparently typified in Joseph Goldmark and Adolf Fischhof of Vienna) and of international capital, as seen in the 1848 report from Eduard von Müller-Tellering, the Viennese correspondent of Marx's Neue Rheinische Zeitung, which declared that "tyranny comes from money and the money belongs to the Jews".

About 4,000 exiles went to the United States, fleeing the reactionary purges. Of these, 100 went to the Texas Hill Country as German Texans. German Americans would play a major role in the American Civil War. More widely, many disillusioned and persecuted revolutionaries, in particular (though not exclusively) those from Germany and the Austrian Empire, left their homelands for foreign exile in the New World or in the more liberal European nations; these emigrants were known as the Forty-Eighters. Sentiment among German Americans was largely anti-slavery, especially among Forty-Eighters.

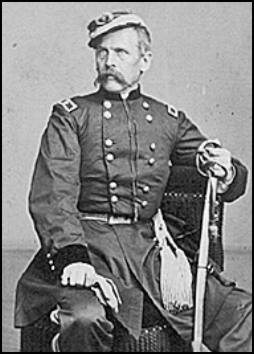
Louis Blenker (Germany)

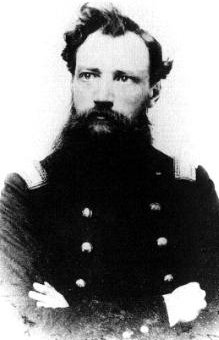
Alexander Schimmelfennig (Germany)

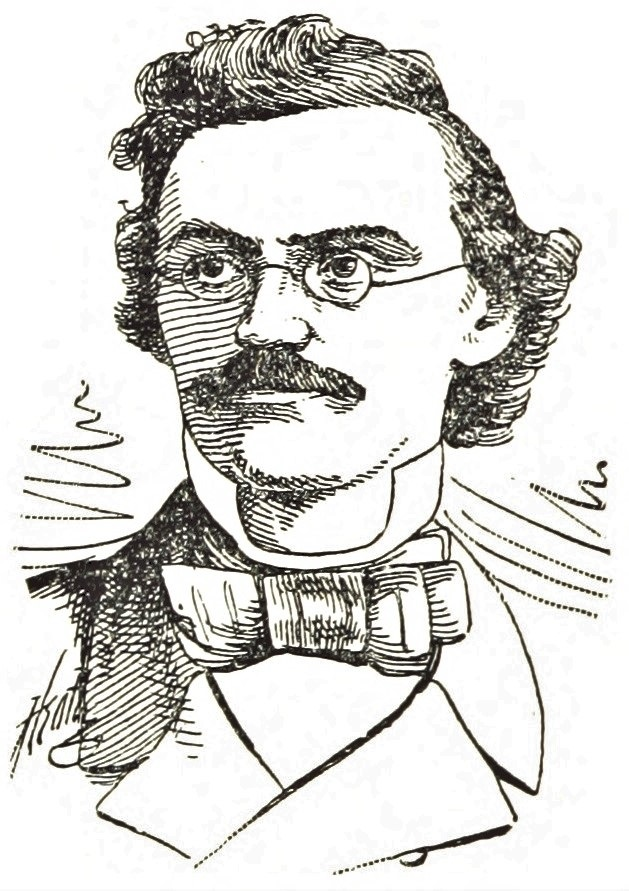
Carl Schurz (Germany)

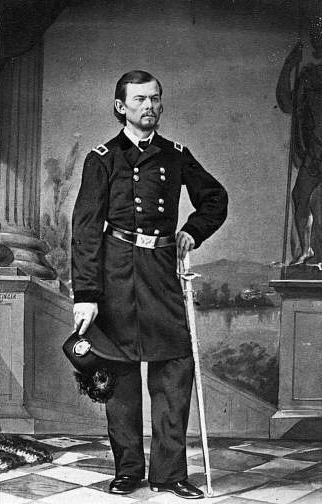
Franz Sigel (Germany)

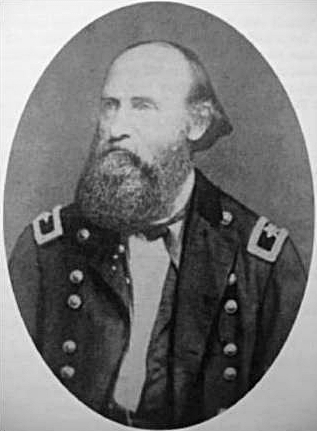
August Willich (Germany)

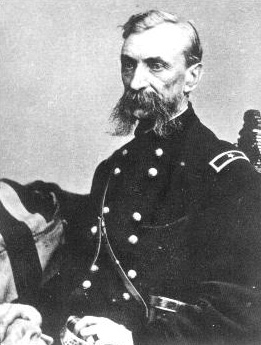
Alexander Asboth (Hungary)

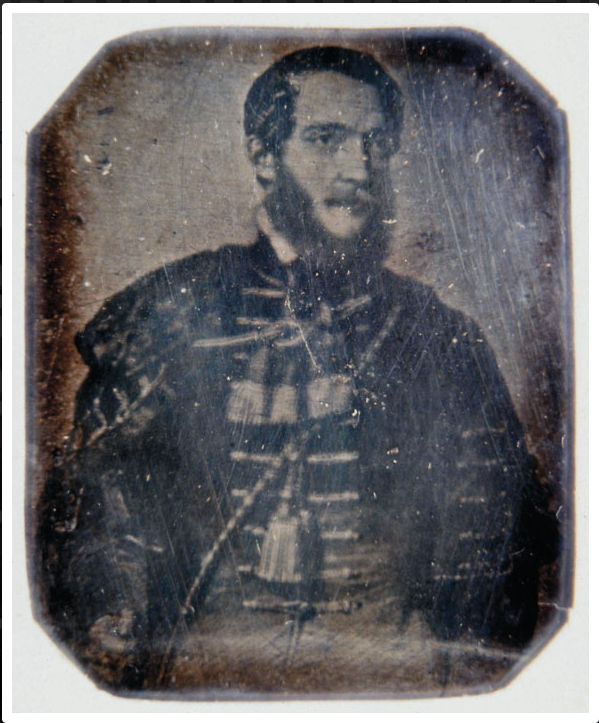
Lajos Kossuth (Hungary)

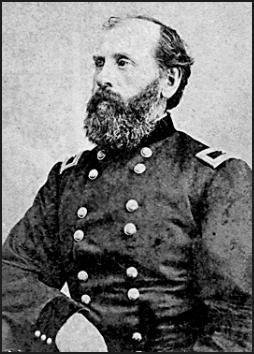
Albin Francisco Schoepf (Poland, Hungary)

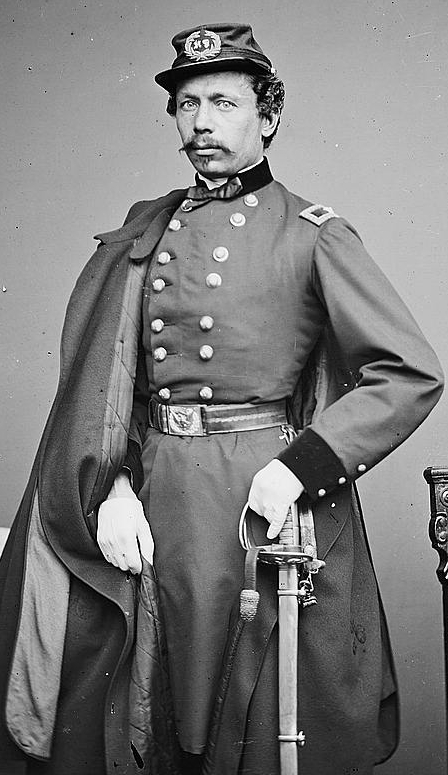
Julius Stahel (Hungary)

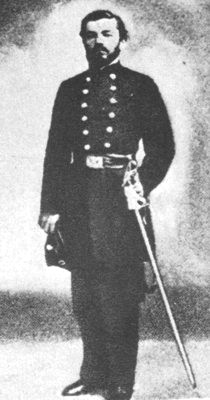
Charles Zagonyi (Hungary)

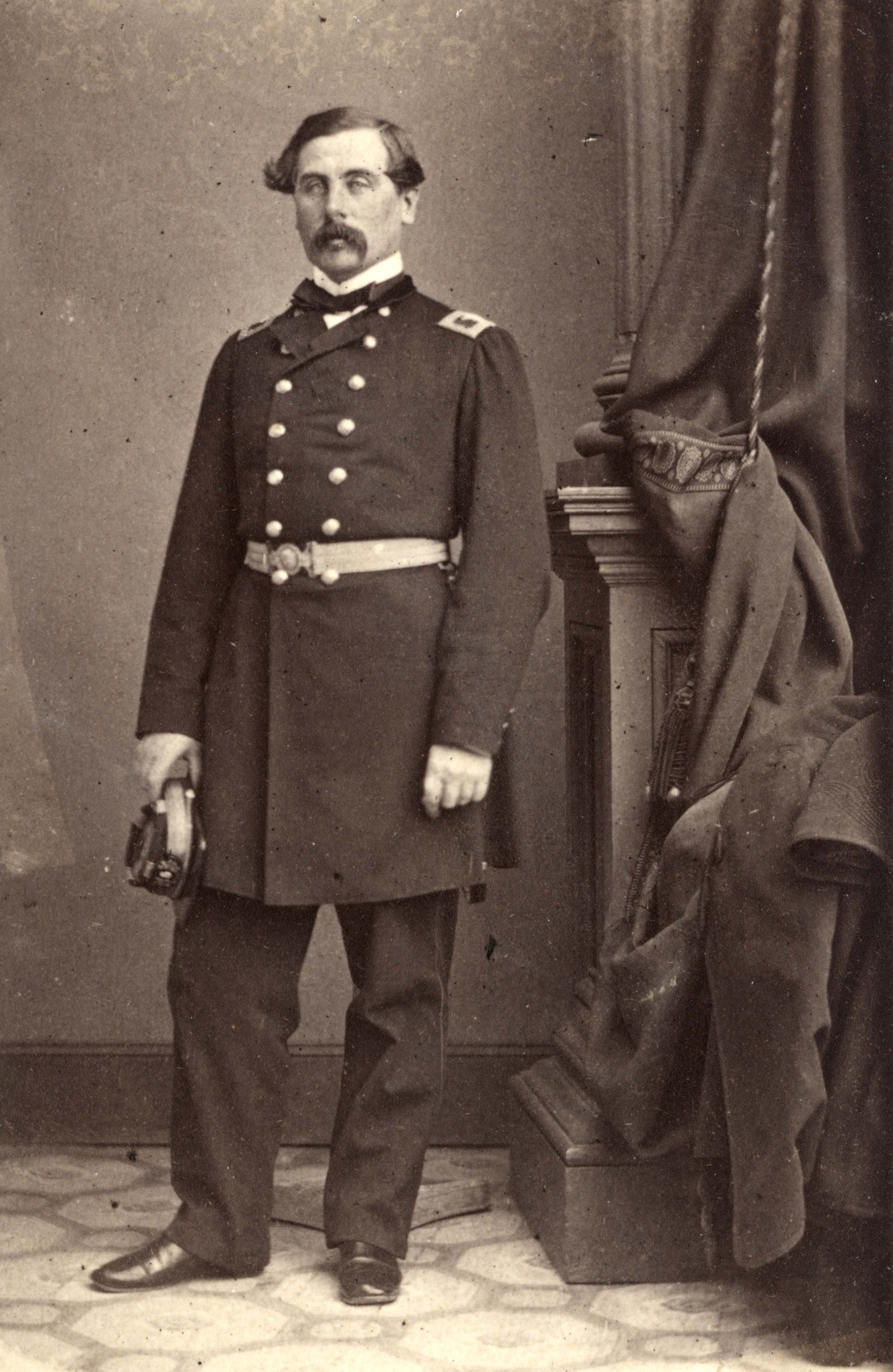
Thomas Francis Meagher (Ireland)

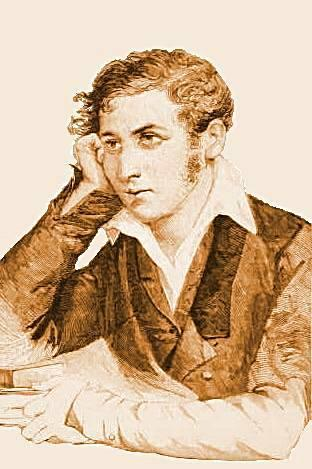
Carlo Cattaneo (Italy)

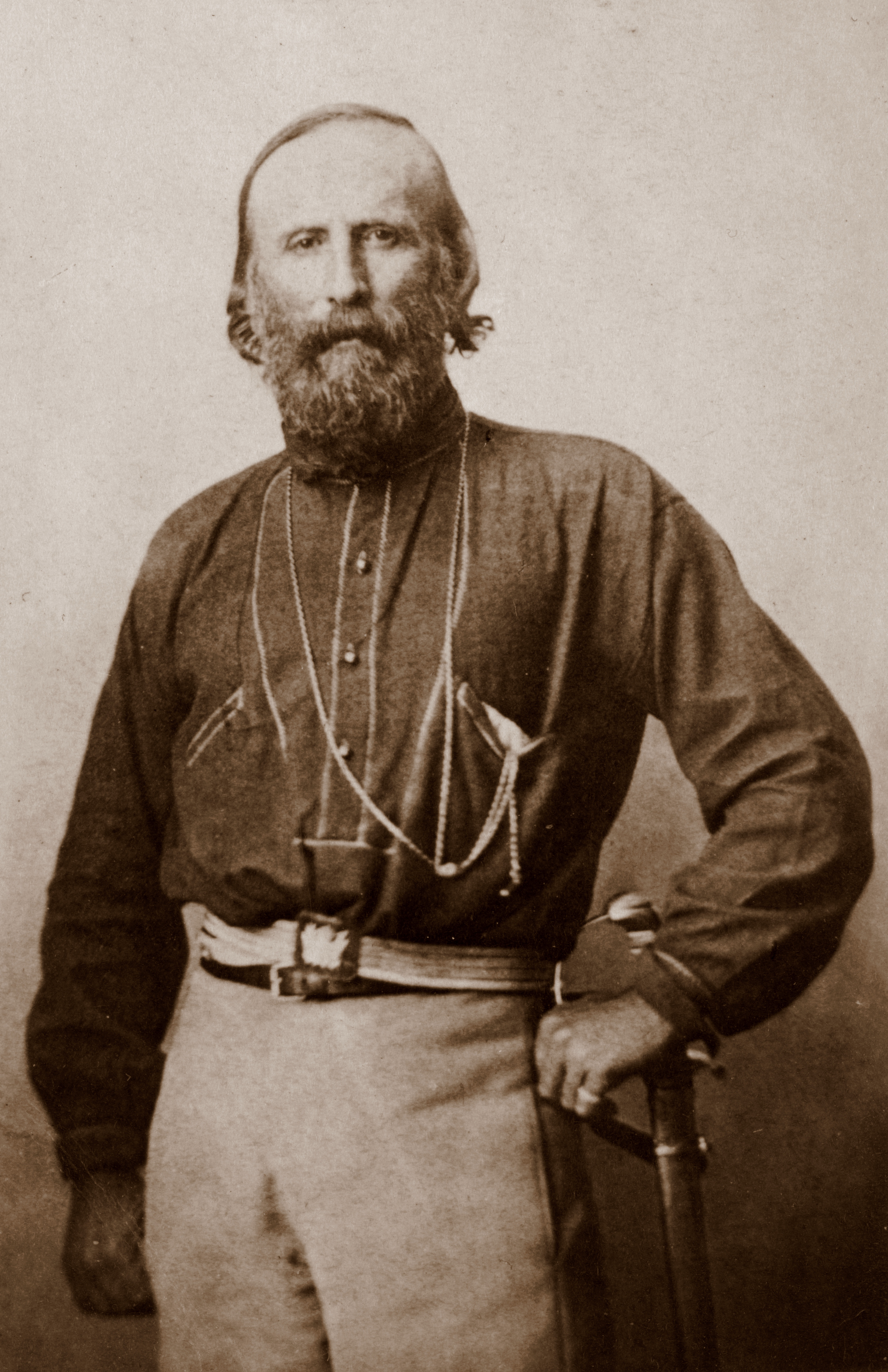
Giuseppe Garibaldi (Italy)

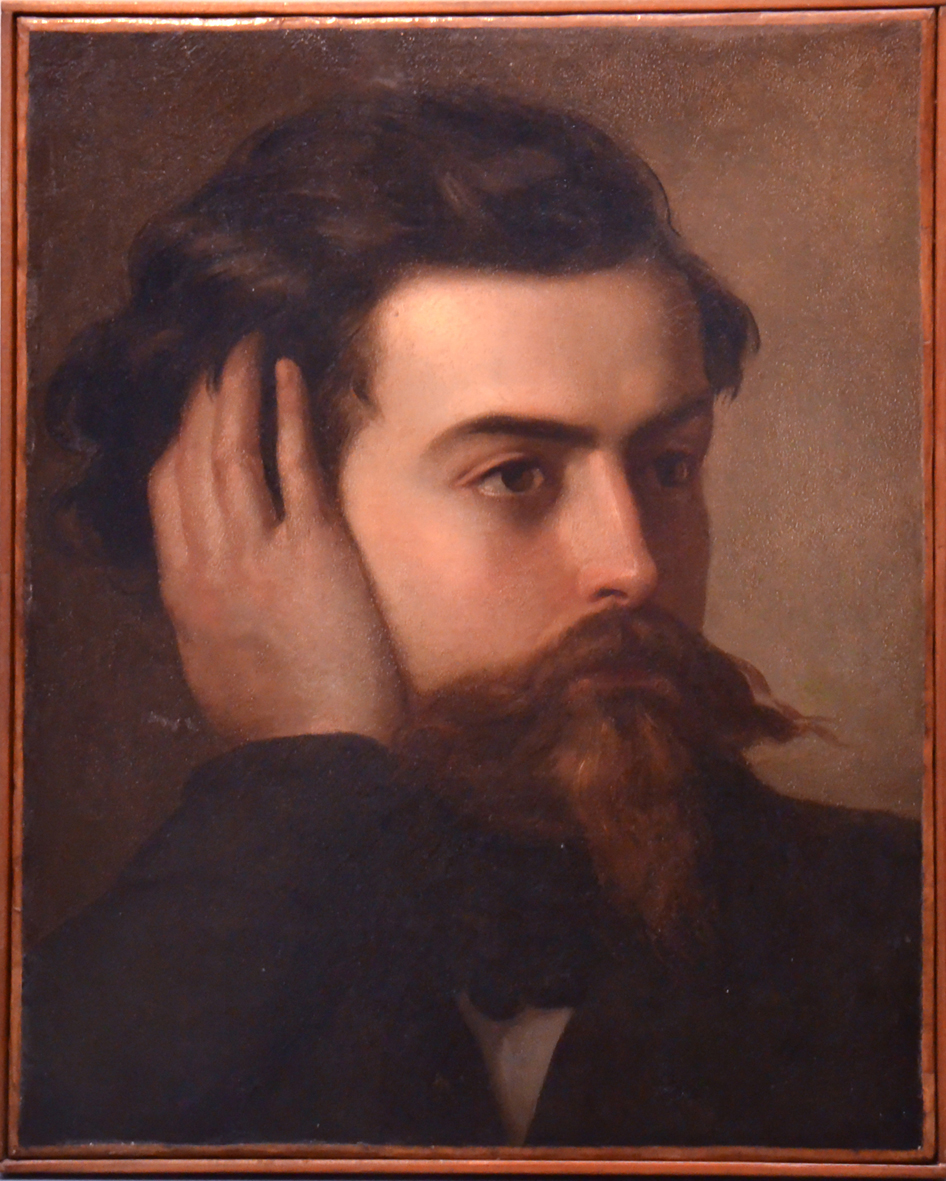
Goffredo Mameli (Italy)

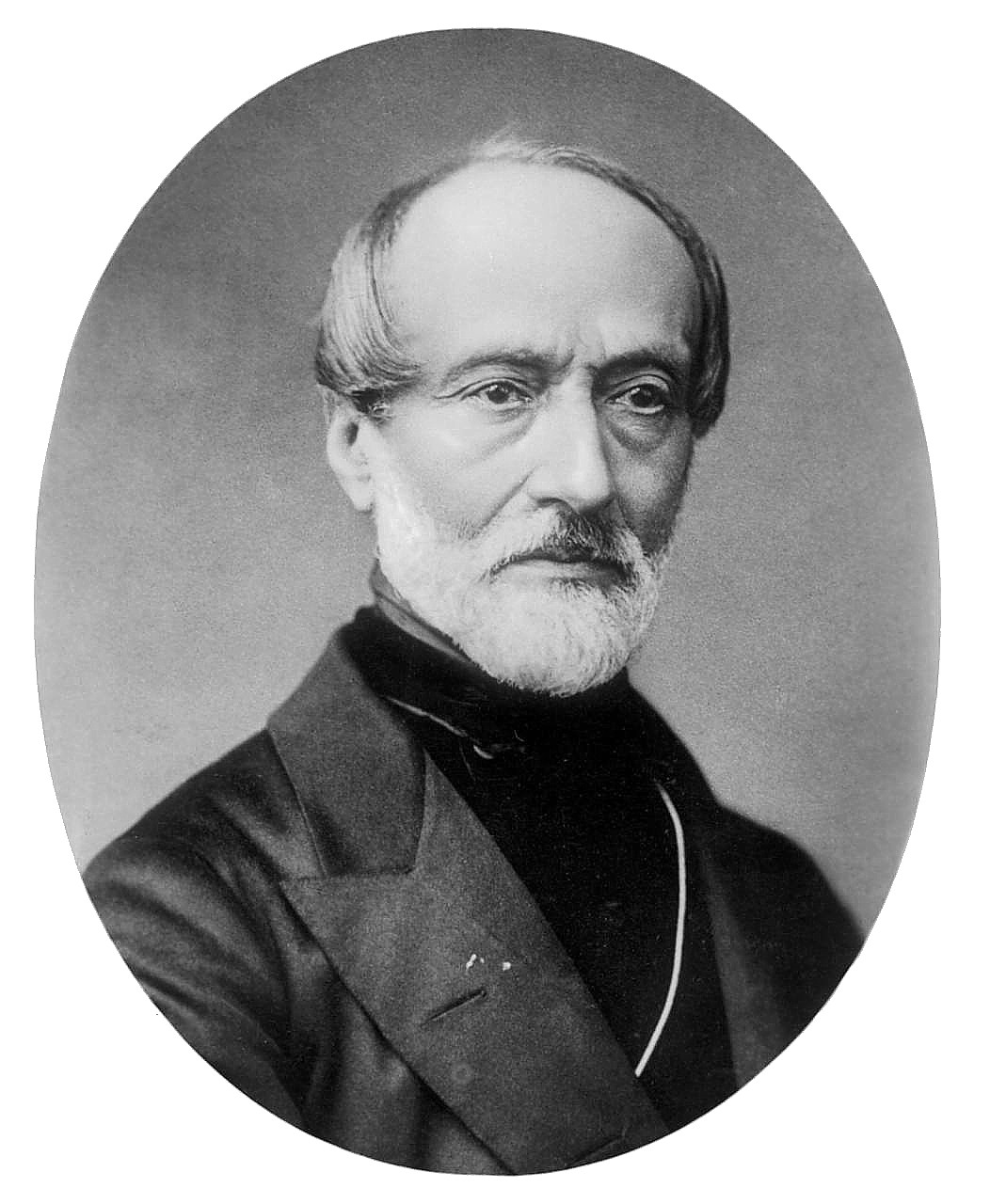
Giuseppe Mazzini (Italy)

Włodzimierz Krzyżanowski (Poland)

=== In popular culture ===
Steven Brust and Emma Bull's 1997 epistolary novel Freedom & Necessity is set in England in the aftermath of the Revolutions of 1848.

The 2021 Ukrainian TV series Coffee with Cardamom follows a love-story amid the Revolutions of 1848.

== See also ==
- Arab Spring
- Colour Revolutions
- Democracy in Europe
- Protests of 1968
- Revolutions of 1830
- Revolutions of 1917–1923
- Revolutions of 1989

== Notes, references, and sources ==
=== Works cited ===
==== Books ====
- Agulhon, Maurice (1983). The Republican Experiment, 1848–1852. Translated by Lloyd, Janet. Cambridge University Press. ISBN 978-0-521-28988-7.
- Blum, Jerome (1978). The End of the Old Order in Rural Europe. Princeton University Press. ISBN 978-1-4008-8577-0. Archived from the original on 30 October 2025.
- Breuilly, John (2014). Austria, Prussia, and the Making of Germany, 1806-1871 (2nd ed.). Routledge. ISBN 978-1-4082-7276-3.
- Broers, Michael (1996). Europe after Napoleon: Revolution, reaction and romanticism, 1814–1848. Manchester University Press. ISBN 0-7190-4722-6.
- Clark, Christopher (2023). Revolutionary Spring: Europe Aflame and the Fight for a New World, 1848-1849. Crown Publishing. ISBN 978-0-525-57520-7.
- Deák, István (1979). The Lawful Revolution: Louis Kossuth and the Hungarians, 1848-1849. Phoenix Press. ISBN 978-0-231-04602-2.
- Fortescue, William (2005). France and 1848: The End of Monarchy (E-book ed.). Routledge. ISBN 0-203-32287-8.
- Guyver, Christopher (2016). The Second French Republic 1848-1852. New York: Palgrave Macmillan US. doi:10.1057/978-1-137-59740-3. ISBN 978-1-137-59739-7.
- Hahn, Hans Joachim (2013). The 1848 Revolutions in German-Speaking Europe. Routledge. ISBN 978-0-582-35765-5.
- Judson, Pieter M. (2016). The Habsburg Empire: A New History. Harvard University Press. ISBN 978-0-674-04776-1.
- Pánek, Jaroslav; Tuma, Oldrich (2019). A History of the Czech Lands (2nd ed.). Karolinum Press. ISBN 978-8-024-62227-9.
- Pech, Stanley Z. (1969). The Czech Revolution of 1848. University of North Carolina Press. ISBN 978-0-807-81123-8.
- Rapport, Mike (2005). Nineteenth-Century Europe. Palgrave Macmillan. ISBN 978-0-333-65245-9.
- Rapport, Mike (2009). 1848: Year of Revolution. Basic Books. ISBN 978-0-465-01436-1.
- Robertson, Priscilla (1971). Revolutions of 1848: A Social History (2nd print. ed.). Princeton University Press. ISBN 978-0-691-00756-4. Archived from the original on 7 October 2024.
- Siemann, Wolfram (1998). The German Revolution of 1848-49. St. Martin's Press. ISBN 978-0-312-21695-5.
- Sked, Alan (2001). The Decline and Fall of the Habsburg Empire, 1815–1918 (2nd ed.). Longman. ISBN 978-0-582-35666-5.
- Sperber, Jonathan (1991). Rhineland Radicals: The Democratic Movement and the Revolution of 1848-1849. Princeton University Press. ISBN 978-0-691-23321-5. Archived from the original on 29 October 2025.
- Sperber, Jonathan (2005). The European Revolutions, 1848–1851 (2nd ed.). Cambridge University Press. ISBN 978-1-139-44590-0. Archived from the original on 7 October 2024.
- Stadelmann, Rudolf (1975). Social and Political History of the German 1848 Revolution. Translated by Chastain, James G. Ohio University Press. ISBN 978-0-821-40177-4.
- Stearns, Peter N. (1974). 1848: The Revolutionary Tide in Europe. W. W. Norton & Company. ISBN 978-0-393-09311-7.
- Traugott, Mark (2010). The Insurgent Barricade. University of California Press. ISBN 978-0-520-26632-2.

==== Book chapters ====
- Ellis, Geoffrey (2002). "The Revolution of 1848–1849 in France". In Evans, Robert; Pogge von Strandmann, Hartmut (eds.). The Revolutions in Europe, 1848–1849: From Reform to Reaction. Oxford University Press. pp. 27–54. ISBN 978-0-199-24997-8. Archived from the original on 6 June 2024.
- Evans, R. J. W. (2002). "1848–1849 in the Habsburg Monarchy". In Evans, Robert; Pogge von Strandmann, Hartmut (eds.). The Revolutions in Europe, 1848–1849: From Reform to Reaction. Oxford University Press. pp. 181–206. ISBN 978-0-199-24997-8. Archived from the original on 6 June 2024.
- Gildea, Robert (2002). "1848 in European Collective Memory". In Evans, Robert; Pogge von Strandmann, Hartmut (eds.). The Revolutions in Europe, 1848–1849: From Reform to Reaction. Oxford University Press. pp. 207–36. ISBN 978-0199249978.
- Haupt, Heinz-Gerhard; Langewiesche, Dieter (2008). "The European Revolution of 1848: Its Political and Social Reforms, its Politics of Nationalism, and its Short- and Long-Term Consequences". In Dowe, Dieter; Haupt, Heinz-Gerhard; Langewische, Dieter; Sperber, Jonathan (eds.). Europe in 1848: Revolution and Reform. Berghahn. pp. 1–23. ISBN 978-1-57181-164-6.
- Kor̆alka, Jir̆í (2008). "Revolutions in the Habsburg Monarchy". In Dowe, Dieter; Haupt, Heinz-Gerhard; Langewische, Dieter; Sperber, Jonathan (eds.). Europe in 1848: Revolution and Reform. Berghahn. pp. 145–69. ISBN 978-1-57181-164-6.
- Langewiesche, Dieter (2008a). "Revolution in Germany: Constitutional State—Nation-State—Social Reform". In Dowe, Dieter; Haupt, Heinz-Gerhard; Langewische, Dieter; Sperber, Jonathan (eds.). Europe in 1848: Revolution and Reform. Berghahn. pp. 120–43. ISBN 978-1-57181-164-6.
- Langewiesche, Dieter (2008b). "The Role of the Military in the European Revolutions of 1848". In Dowe, Dieter; Haupt, Heinz-Gerhard; Langewische, Dieter; Sperber, Jonathan (eds.). Europe in 1848: Revolution and Reform. Berghahn. pp. 694–707. ISBN 978-1-57181-164-6.
- Mack Smith, Denis (2002). "The Revolutions of 1848–1849 in Italy". In Evans, Robert; Pogge von Strandmann, Hartmut (eds.). The Revolutions in Europe, 1848–1849: From Reform to Reaction. Oxford University Press. pp. 55–82. ISBN 978-0-19-924997-8. Archived from the original on 6 June 2024.
- Pogge von Strandmann, Hartmut (2002). "1848–1849: A European Revolution?". In Evans, Robert; Pogge von Strandmann, Hartmut (eds.). The Revolutions in Europe, 1848–1849: From Reform to Reaction. Oxford: Oxford University Press. pp. 1–8. ISBN 978-0199249978.

==== Journal articles ====
- Berger, Helge; Spoerer, Mark (2001). "Economic Crises and the European Revolutions of 1848". The Journal of Economic History. 61 (2): 293–326. doi:10.1017/S0022050701028029. JSTOR 2698022. Archived from the original on 6 April 2025 – via JSTOR.
- Gouldner, Alvin (1983). "Artisans and Intellectuals in the German Revolution of 1848". Theory and Society. 12 (4): 521–32. doi:10.1007/BF00187755. JSTOR 657388. Archived from the original on 25 May 2021 – via JSTOR.
- O'Boyle, Lenore (1961). "The Democratic Left in Germany, 1848". The Journal of Modern History. 33 (4): 374–383. doi:10.1086/238910. JSTOR 1877214. Archived from the original on 30 October 2025 – via JSTOR.
- O'Boyle, Lenore (1966). "The Middle Class in Western Europe, 1815–1848". The American Historical Review. 71 (3): 825–845. doi:10.2307/1846024. JSTOR 1846024. Archived from the original on 18 May 2026 – via JSTOR.
- O'Boyle, Lenore (1970). "The Problem of an Excess of Educated Men in Western Europe, 1800–1850". The Journal of Modern History. 42 (4): 471–495. doi:10.1086/244035. JSTOR 1905825. Archived from the original on 4 November 2025 – via JSTOR.
- Shorter, Edward (1969). "Middle-Class Anxiety in the German Revolution of 1848". The Journal of Social History. 2 (3): 189–215. doi:10.1353/jsh/2.3.189. JSTOR 3786483. Archived from the original on 31 October 2025 – via JSTOR.
- Weyland, Kurt (July 2009). "The Diffusion of Revolution: '1848' in Europe and Latin America". International Organization. 63 (3): 391–423. doi:10.1017/S0020818309090146. ISSN 0020-8183. JSTOR 40345942.

==== Web sources ====
- Chastain, James (4 November 2005). "Encyclopedia of 1848 Revolutions". Ohio State University. Archived from the original on 7 October 2024.
- Ó Gráda, Cormac; Vanhaute, Eric; Paping, Richard (2006). The European subsistence crisis of 1845-1850: a comparative perspective (PDF). XIV International Economic History Congress. Archived from the original (PDF) on 17 April 2017.

=== Further reading ===
==== Surveys ====
- Pouthas, Charles (1971). "The Revolutions of 1848". In Bury, J. P. T. (ed.). The New Cambridge Modern History. Vol. X. The Zenith of European Power, 1830–70 (Repr. ed.). Cambridge University Press. pp. 389–415. ISBN 978-0-521-04548-3.
- Langer, William L. (1969). Political and social upheaval, 1832-1852. New York: Harper & Row.
  - Langer, William L. (1971). The revolutions of 1848: chapters from political and social upheaval. Harper torchbooks (1. ed.). New York: Harper & Row. ISBN 978-0-06-131582-4. Ch 10–14 of his 1969 book

==== France ====
- Clark, Timothy James (1999). Image of the people: Gustave Courbet and the 1848 revolution. Berkeley: University of California Press. ISBN 978-0-520-21745-4.
- Duveau, Georges (1967). 1848: The Making of a Revolution. Translated by Carter, Anne. Introduction by George Rudé. New York: Vintage Books. ISBN 978-0-394-70471-5.
- Fasel, George (Autumn 1974). "The Wrong Revolution: French Republicanism in 1848". French Historical Studies. 8 (4): 654–677. doi:10.2307/285857. JSTOR 285857.
- Loubere, Leo A. (April 1968). "The Emergence of the Extreme Left in Lower Languedoc, 1848-1851: Social and Economic Factors in Politics". The American Historical Review. 73 (4): 1019–1051. doi:10.2307/1847387. JSTOR 1847387.
- Merriman, John M. (1978). The agony of the Republic: the repression of the left in revolutionary France, 1848-1851. New Haven: Yale University Press. ISBN 978-0-300-02151-6.

==== Germany and Austria ====
- Hahn, Hans Joachim (2001). The 1848 revolutions in German-speaking Europe. Themes in modern German history series (1. ed.). Harlow; Munich: Longman. ISBN 978-0-582-35765-5.
- Hamerow, Theodore S. (October 1954). "History and the German Revolution of 1848". The American Historical Review. 60 (1): 27–44. doi:10.2307/1842744. JSTOR 1842744.
- Hewitson, M. (October 2010). "'The Old Forms are Breaking Up, ... Our New Germany is Rebuilding Itself': Constitutionalism, Nationalism and the Creation of a German Polity during the Revolutions of 1848-49". The English Historical Review. CXXV (516): 1173–1214. doi:10.1093/ehr/ceq276. ISSN 0013-8266.
- Macartney, C.A. (July 1977). "1848 in the Habsburg Monarchy". European Studies Review. 7 (3): 285–309. doi:10.1177/026569147700700303. ISSN 0014-3111.
- Robertson, Priscilla Smith (1967). Revolutions of 1848: A Social History. Princeton University Press. pp. 105–286. ISBN 978-0-691-00756-4.
- Sked, Alan (1979). The Survival of the Habsburg empire: Radetzky, the imperial army and the class war, 1848. London; New York: Longman. ISBN 978-0-582-50711-1.
- Vick, Brian E. (2002). Defining Germany: the 1848 Frankfurt parliamentarians and national identity. Harvard historical studies. Cambridge, Mass: Harvard University Press. ISBN 978-0-674-00911-0.

==== Italy ====
- Ginsborg, Paul (September 1974). "Peasants and Revolutionaries in Venice and the Veneto, 1848". The Historical Journal. 17 (3): 503–550. doi:10.1017/S0018246X00005276. ISSN 0018-246X. JSTOR 2638387.
- Ginsborg, Paul (1979). Daniele Manin and the Venitian revolution of 1848-1849. London; New York; Melbourne: Cambridge University Press. ISBN 978-0-521-22077-4.
- Robertson, Priscilla (1971). Revolutions of 1848: a social history (2. ed.). Princeton, NJ: Princeton University Press. pp. 309–381. ISBN 978-0-691-00756-4.

==== Other ====
- Kilich-Cafer Güler, Selda; Sezer Feyzioğlu, Hamiyet (2009). "Revolutions of 1848 and the Ottoman Empire". Bulgarian Historical Review. 37 (3–4): 196–205.

==== Historiography ====
- Dénes, Iván Zoltán (2010). "Reinterpreting a 'Founding Father': Kossuth Images and Their Contexts, 1848-2009" (PDF). East Central Europe. 37 (1): 90–117. doi:10.1163/187633010X489299. hdl:2437/103081. ISSN 0094-3037.
- Hamerow, Theodore S. (December 1954). "History and the German Revolution of 1848". The American Historical Review. 60 (1): 27–44. doi:10.2307/1842744. JSTOR 1842744.
- Jones, Peter (1991). The 1848 Revolutions. Seminar studies in history (2nd ed.). London : New York: Longman. ISBN 978-0-582-06106-4.
- Mattheisen, Donald J. (December 1983). "History as Current Events: Recent Works on the German Revolution of 1848". The American Historical Review. 88 (5): 1219–1237. doi:10.2307/1904890. JSTOR 1904890.
- Rothfels, Hans (December 1948). "1848-One Hundred Years After". The Journal of Modern History. 20 (4): 291–319. doi:10.1086/237220. ISSN 0022-2801. JSTOR 1871060.
