= December Constitution =

The December Constitution (German: Dezemberverfassung) is a set of six acts that served as the constitution of the Cisleithanian half of Austria-Hungary. The acts were proclaimed by Emperor Franz Joseph on 21 December 1867 and functioned as the supreme law of the land until the collapse of the empire in 1918. Five of the Constitution's acts were replaced by the Federal Constitutional Law between 1918 and 1920; the sixth law, a bill of rights, is still in force.

== Content ==
The December Constitution consists of

- a law expanding the powers of the Imperial Council;
- the Basic Law on the General Rights of Nationals (Staatsgrundgesetz über die allgemeinen Rechte der Staatsbürger), a bill of rights;
- the Basic Law Establishing a Supreme Court of the Empire (Staatsgrundgesetz über die Einsetzung eines Reichsgerichts);
- the Basic Law on the Judiciary (Staatsgrundgesetz über die richterliche Gewalt), a law establishing an independent court system;
- the Basic Law on the Executive (Staatsgrundgesetz über die Ausübung der Regierungs- und Vollzugsgewalt);
- the Delegation Law, a law regulating relations between the Cisleithanian and Transleithanian legislatures.

The Basic Law on the General Rights of Nationals is a bill of rights stipulating, among other things, equality before the law for all the empire's ethnicities (articles 1, 2, 3, and 19), the end of all forms of serfdom (art. 7), freedom of the press (art. 13), freedom of religion (articles 14 and 15), freedom of assembly (article 12), and secrecy of correspondence (art. 10). It also established a limited form of due process; under the Basic Law, a person could not be arbitrarily deprived of the freedom of their person (art. 8), their property (art. 5), or the inviolability of their home (art. 9).

The Basic Law of the Judiciary stipulated the separation of administration and judiciary and the independence of the courts. It also guaranteed the right of the people to participate in the administration of criminal justice; serious crimes would from now on require trial by jury. Last but not least, the Law established a system administrative courts, making executive acts of government subject to judicial review.

The Delegation Law affirmed and ratified, for the Cisleithanian party to the conflict, the main outcome of the Austro-Hungarian Compromise of 1867: Cisleithania and Transleithania would act as a single monolithic entity for the purposes of international law; they would have a joint diplomatic service, a joint foreign office, and joint armed forces. Otherwise, the Kingdom of Hungary would be a fully independent separate country.

The remaining laws dealt mainly with procedural details and miscellanea such as the immunity of Imperial Council delegates.

== Genesis ==
Until 1848, the Austrian Empire was an absolute monarchy with no written constitution and no modern concept of the rule of law. In 1848, a wave of revolutions swept Austria; the revolutionaries demanded, among other things, constitutionalism and freedom of the press. By 15 March, Emperor Ferdinand I had been forced to promise to meet these demands. On 25 April, pursuant to this promise, Ferdinand proclaimed the Pillersdorf Constitution, named after its principal framer, Minister of the Interior Baron Franz von Pillersdorf. The Pillersdorf Constitution, written essentially by the cabinet with no consultation of any kind of elected council, was widely seen as inadequate and did nothing to stem the tide of revolutionary unrest. In December, Ferdinand was forced to abdicate. Among other desperate measures, he had already declared the constitution "provisional" in May and completely scrapped it in July.

Ferdinand's successor, Franz Joseph, was determined to reassert absolute monarchy. By March 1849, he had taken back the streets and mostly neutralized the intellectuals. He still needed to sideline the revolutionaries' unauthorised constitutional assembly, the Kremsier Parliament, which had promulgated its own draft constitution, the Kremsier Constitution. Between 4 and 7 March, to preempt the Kremsier Parliament, he proclaimed his March Constitution, seemingly giving in to most of the Kremsier demands. The Kremsier Parliament dealt with, he revoked his own constitution with the 31 December 1851 New Year's Eve Patent.

No written constitution left in force, Austria lurched back towards a centralized monarchy. The empire, and with it the personal authority of the Emperor, was severely weakened by a series of diplomatic setbacks, the rise of civic nationalism, and the growing disaffection of the empire's Hungarian and Slavic subjects with the Habsburgs' rule. By 1860, Franz Joseph was forced to formally share power again. A new constitution, the 1860 October Diploma, granted more autonomy to the provinces and strengthened regional nobility; regional legislative and administrative authority would partially lie with each region's respective aristocracy. The October diploma proved to be too little, too late: it neither satisfied the nobles nor, in particular, the people of the Kingdom of Hungary. The 1861 February Patent made further concessions, again failing to pacify Hungary.

Hungary had come close to independence during the 1848 revolutions, had been beaten into submission only with the help of the Russian Empire, and had lived under what effectively was a military dictatorship ever since. In 1866, Austria was defeated in the Austro-Prussian War and lost its claim to being the leading German state, plunging the Habsburg dynasty and their German-speaking realms into an unprecedented identity crisis. The monarch's moral authority gravely damaged once more, unrest in Hungary threatened to erupt again. As a result, Franz Joseph granted Hungary all but full independence in the Austro-Hungarian Compromise of 1867. To prevent the empire's non-Hungarian ethnicities from demanding similar levels of autonomy, Franz Joseph then had to return to constitutionalism and vest the empire's peoples with participation rights in the legislative and administrative process.

== Abrogation ==
As a result of Austria's defeat in World War I, Austria-Hungary collapsed in October 1918. Both the Kingdom of Hungary and the Slavic provinces of Cisleithania broke away from the German-speaking core lands to form modern nation states. Many of the institutions established by the December Constitution collapsed; in particular, the Imperial Council could no longer function. Many of the provisions of the Constitution became moot outright. It was obvious the emerging rump state would need a new legal framework. On 21 October 1918, parliamentarians from the German-speaking regions convened to form a Provisional National Assembly (Provisorische Nationalversammlung) to manage this transition.

On 30 October, the Assembly proclaimed a provisional constitution. The provisional constitution did little more than establish the Assembly as a provisional parliament, establish the parliament's three-member presidium as the provisional head of state, and set up a provisional cabinet. Even so, most of the articles of the December Constitution were thus implicitly abrogated. The act did not include any catalogue of basic rights, although it was followed on the same day by a resolution abolishing censorship and establishing freedom of the press, leaving the Basic Law on the General Rights of Nationals on the books.

General elections on 16 February 1919 replaced the Provisional Assembly with a Constitutional Assembly (Konstituierende Nationalversammlung). On 1 October 1920, the Assembly passed the Federal Constitutional Law, confirming and formalizing the abrogation of the December Constitution. The Law not containing any new bill of rights either, the Basic Law on the General Rights of Nationals in still in force. Together with the 1955 Austrian State Treaty and the 1955 European Convention on Human Rights, ratified by Austria in 1958 and part of the country's body of constitutional law since 1964, it serves as Austria's bill of rights to this day. In particular, the promise of equality in Austria's current constitution is modelled on the analogue provision in the statute.

== Literature ==
- Berchtold, Klaus (1998): Verfassungsgeschichte der Republik Österreich. Springer. Vienna, Austria. ISBN 3-211-83188-6.
- Brauneder, Wilhelm (2005): Österreichische Verfassungsgeschichte. 10. Auflage. Manz. Vienna, Austria. ISBN 3-214-14875-3.
- Öhlinger, Theo and Eberhard, Harald (2014): Verfassungsrecht. 9., überarbeitete Auflage. Facultas. Vienna, Austria. ISBN 978-3-7089-0844-1
- Walter, Friedrich (1970): Die österreichische Zentralverwaltung. III. Abteilung. Von der Märzrevolution 1848 bis zur Dezemberverfassung 1867. Band 3. Die Geschichte der Ministerien vom Durchbruch des Absolutismus bis zum Ausgleich mit Ungarn und zur Konstitutionalisierung der österreichischen Länder 1852 bis 1867. Holzhausen. Vienna, Austria. No ISBN.
