= 1848 Cisleithanian legislative election =

Parliamentary elections were held for the first time the Austrian section of the Austrian Empire (Cisleithania) in June 1848.

The elections were held after the Revolutions of 1848 caused the Klemens von Metternich government to fall. The elections followed the imposition of a new constitution on 25 April by Ferdinand I. The new Imperial Council first met in Vienna on 22 July, but was then relocated to Kremsier in Moravia due to fighting, after which it became known as the Kremsier Parliament.
