= Baron Anton von Doblhoff-Dier =

Austrian politician

Hochwohlgeboren Anton Freiherr von Doblhoff-Dier
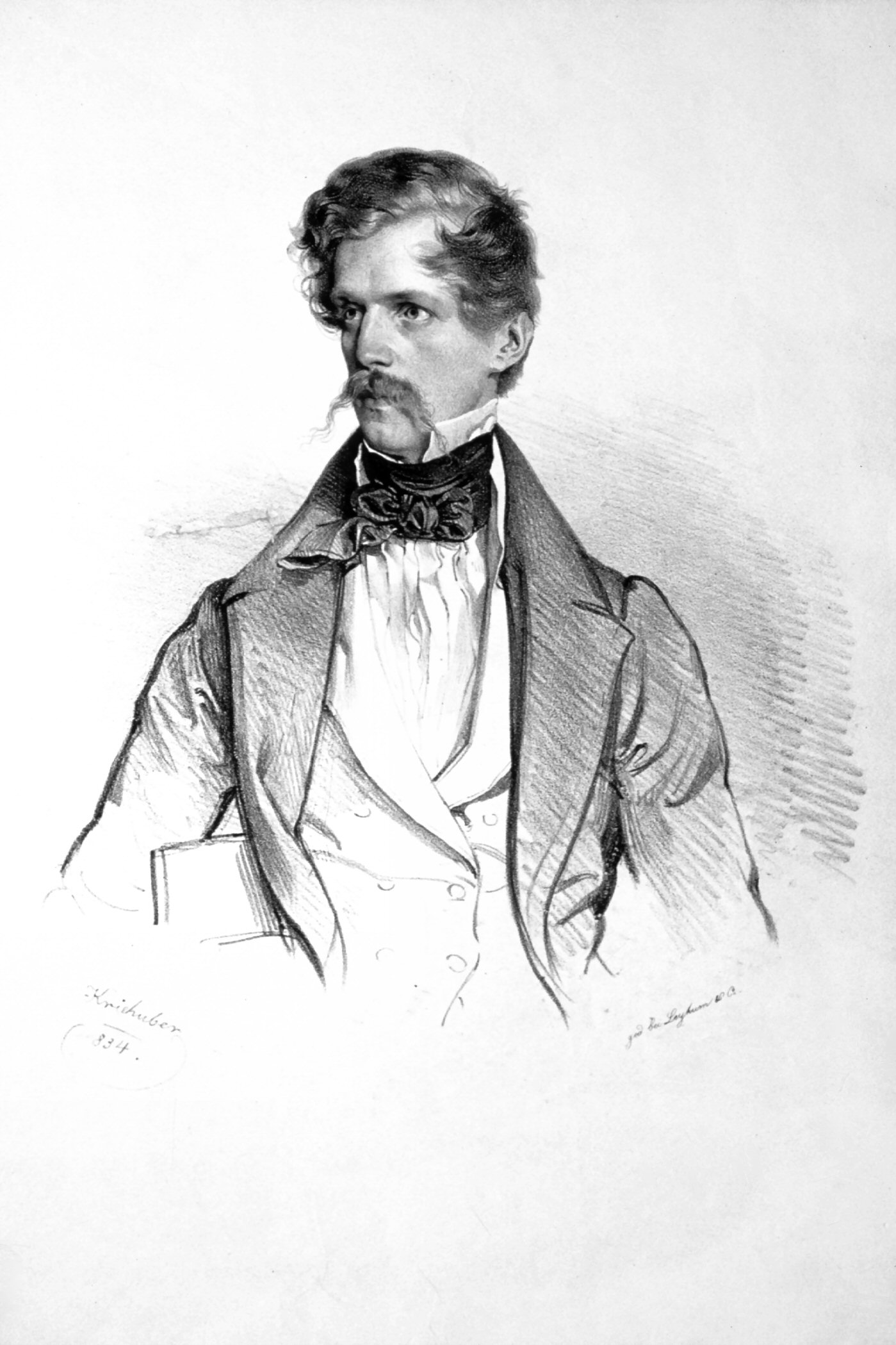
- Baron Anton von Doblhoff, lithograph by Josef Kriehuber, 1834

Minister-President of the Austrian Empire
- In office 8 July 1848 – 18 July 1848
- Monarch: Ferdinand I
- Preceded by: Baron Franz von Pillersdorf
- Succeeded by: Baron Johann von Wessenberg-Ampringen

Interior Minister of the Austrian Empire
- In office 8 July 1848 – October 1848
- Monarch: Ferdinand I
- Prime Minister: Johann Freiherr von Wessenberg-Ampringen
- Preceded by: Franz Freiherr von Pillersdorf
- Succeeded by: Franz Stadion Graf von Warthausen

Personal details
- Born: 10 November 1800 Gorizia, Görz and Gradisca
- Died: 16 April 1872 (aged 71) Vienna, Austria

Baron Anton von Doblhoff-Dier (German: Anton Freiherr von Doblhoff-Dier) (10 November 1800 – 16 April 1872) was an Austrian statesman.

== Early life ==
Born in Gorizia into an Austrian noble family, he was the son of Joseph von Doblhoff-Dier (1770–1831) and his wife, Josepha von Buschmann (1773–1846).

== Biography ==
He studied law at the University of Vienna and later entered into the civil service. In 1836 he retired to cultivate the manor estate of his uncle at Weikersdorf Castle in Baden, where he excelled in agronomic studies. In the course of the Revolutions of March 1848 he became a liberal member of the Imperial Diet at Kremsier, and trade minister in the cabinet of Franz von Pillersdorf.

Doblhoff-Dier himself resigned from all offices in the violent Vienna Uprising of October 1848. In the next year, he was appointed ambassador at The Hague, a post he held until 1858. In 1861 he became a member of the newly established Reichsrat, from 1867 onwards of the Herrenhaus.

Preceded by Baron Franz von Pillersdorf	Minister-President of the Austrian Empire; 1848	Succeeded by Johann von Wessenberg-Ampringen
Preceded by Baron Franz von Pillersdorf	Interior Minister of the Austrian Empire; 1848	Succeeded by Franz Stadion, Count von Warthausen
