= March Constitution =

March Constitution may refer to:

- March Constitution (Austria)
- March Constitution (Poland)
