= Baron Johann von Wessenberg-Ampringen =

Austrian diplomat statesman

Hochwohlgeboren Johann Philipp Freiherr von Wessenberg-Ampringen
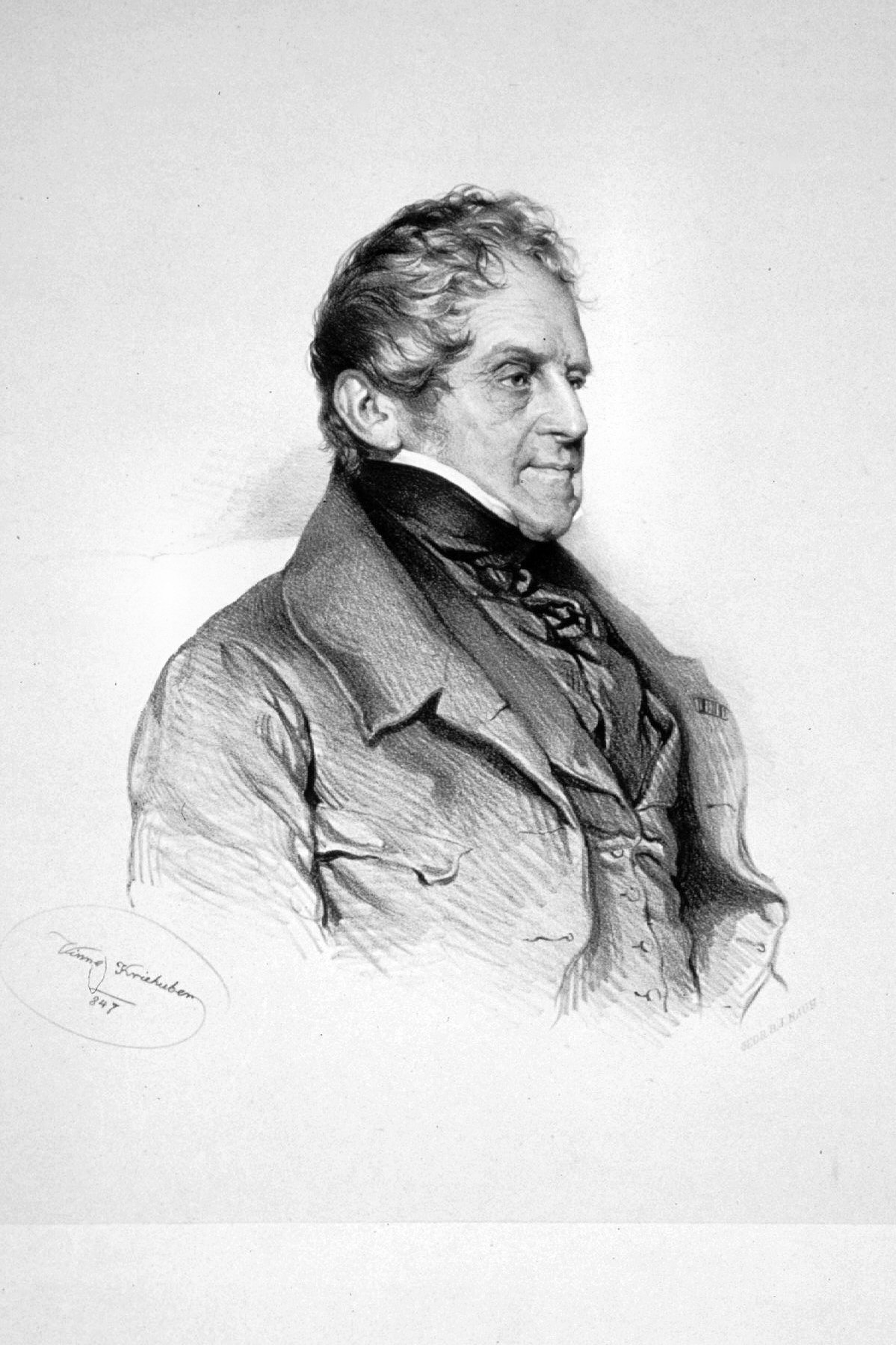
- Lithography by Josef Kriehuber, 1847

Minister-President of the Austrian Empire
- In office 18 July 1848 – 21 November 1848
- Monarch: Ferdinand I
- Preceded by: Anton Feirherr
- Succeeded by: Felix zu Schwarzenberg

4th Foreign Minister of the Austrian Empire
- In office 8 May 1848 – 21 November 1848
- Monarch: Ferdinand I
- Preceded by: Karl Ludwig Reichsgraf von Ficquelmont
- Succeeded by: Felix Prinz zu Schwarzenberg

Personal details
- Born: 28 November 1773 Dresden, Saxony
- Died: 1 August 1858 (aged 84) Freiburg, Baden

Baron Johann von Wessenberg-Ampringen (German: Johann Philipp Freiherr von Wessenberg-Ampringen; 28 November 1773 – 1 August 1858, Freiburg im Breisgau) was an Austrian diplomat statesman.

== Early life ==
Wessenberg was born in Dresden, where his father worked as a tutor to the princes of the electoral House of Wettin. Johann's younger brother Ignaz Heinrich von Wessenberg later chose an ecclesiastical career and in 1801 was appointed Vicar general of the Bishopric of Constance. In 1776 the family returned to Freiburg in Further Austria.

== Career ==
Johann joined the Austrian civil service in 1794. He served as a diplomatic envoy during the War of the Second Coalition supporting the forces of Archduke Charles. From 1801 he worked as a secretary at the Austrian embassy in Berlin led by Count Johann Philipp von Stadion and in 1805 was appointed ambassador at Kassel, where he witnessed the occupation by the French troops under General Mortier in 1806.

In 1808 Wessenberg returned to Berlin as ambassador at the Prussian court. King Frederick William III had fled from Napoleon's forces to East Prussia and Wessenberg had no opportunity to convince him to join the Fifth Coalition against France. From 1811 to 1813 on he led the legation at Munich and afterwards travelled as special envoy to London, France and Milan before in 1814 he was appointed second Austrian delegate (after Prince Metternich) at the Congress of Vienna. Wessenberg efforts made a major contribution to the establishment of the German Confederation. From 1830 he again served as ambassador at The Hague, he also took part in the proceedings after the Belgian Revolution that finally led to the 1839 Treaty of London.

After the Revolutions of 1848, retired Wessenberg was appointed Minister President on 18 July, he nevertheless was forced to flee with the court from the Vienna Uprising to Olomouc, whereafter he resigned on 21 November in favour of Prince Felix of Schwarzenberg.

== Personal life ==
Wessenberg spent his last years at his family's estates in Freiburg, where he also died.

== Notes ==
Preceded by Anton von Doblhoff-Dier	Minister-President of the Austrian Empire; 1848	Succeeded by Prince Felix of Schwarzenberg
