= Baron Franz von Pillersdorf =

Austrian politician (1786–1862)

Hochwohlgeboren Franz Freiherr von Pillersdorf
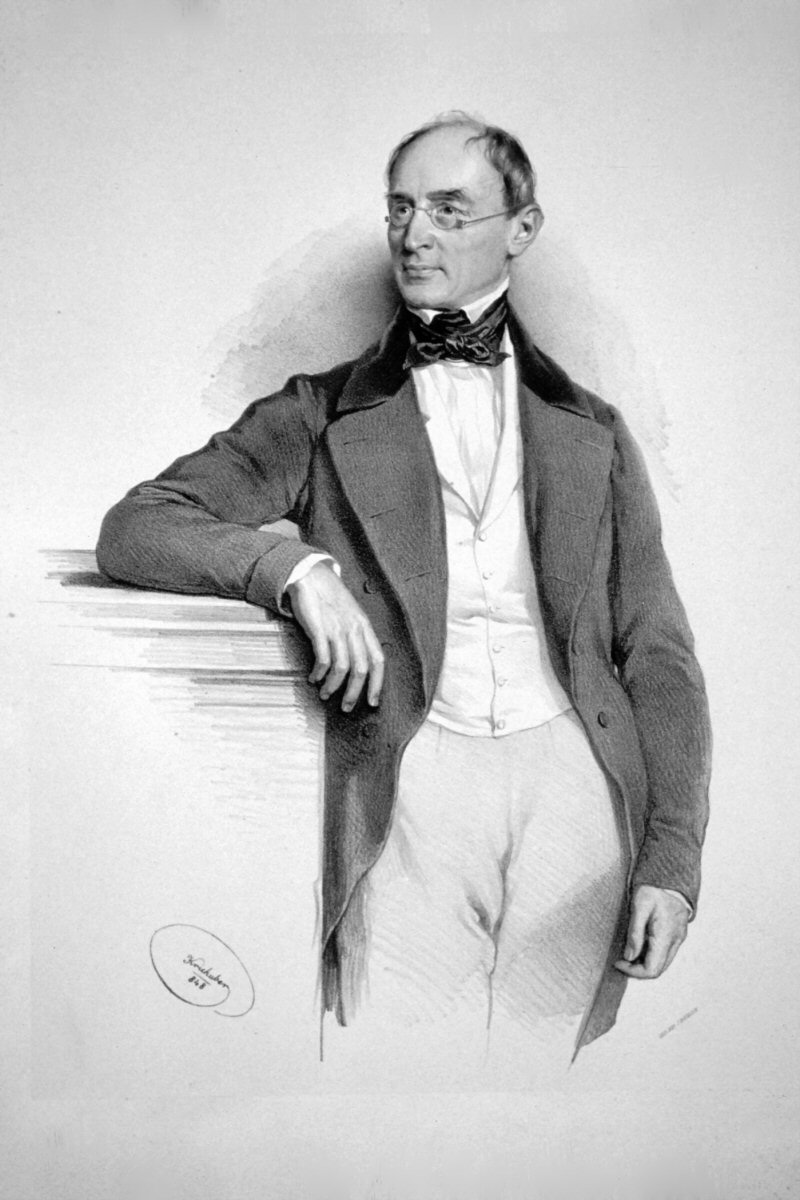
- Lithograph by Josef Kriehuber, 1848

Minister-President of the Austrian Empire
- In office 4 May 1848 – 8 July 1848
- Monarch: Ferdinand I
- Preceded by: Count Karl Ludwig von Ficquelmont
- Succeeded by: Baron Anton von Doblhoff-Dier

Interior Minister of the Austrian Empire
- In office 20 March 1848 – 8 July 1848
- Monarch: Ferdinand I
- Prime Minister: Franz Anton Graf von Kolowrat-Liebsteinsky (March–April); Count Karl Ludwig von Ficquelmont (April–May)
- Preceded by: Franz Anton Graf von Kolowrat-Liebsteinsky
- Succeeded by: Anton Feirherr von Doblhoff-Dier

Personal details
- Born: 1 March 1786 Brno, Moravia
- Died: 22 February 1862 (aged 75) Vienna, Austria

Baron Franz Xaver von Pillersdorf (1 March 1786 – 22 February 1862) was an Austrian statesman.

== Life and career ==
Born in Brno as the son of a judge, Pillersdorf after a legal education in Vienna in 1805 started his public service career in Galicia. In 1807, he returned to Vienna as assistant to the court councillor Baron von Baldacci. This put him in the centre of the action when the war with Napoleon broke out. In the disadvantageous peace according to the 1809 Treaty of Schönbrunn that followed, the Austrian foreign minister Johann Philipp von Stadion had to resign and a new ministry was formed, with Prince Metternich at its head. Baldacci moved to the periphery of power, but Pillersdorff advanced to court secretary and then became a court councillor. Here, Pillersdorff had ample opportunity to acquaint himself with the great disarray in the operation of the Austrian state, and how necessary reform was, but uncommonly difficult to implement.

The events of 1812-1815 increased the oppressive political climate still more. Baldacci became minister of the army and headed the administration of the occupied zones in France, and Pillersdorf was put at his side. Pillersdorf's stay in France and travels to the United Kingdom allowed him to make comparative studies and think about how the people could start participating in lawmaking and government in Austria as well. But the time had not come for such changes in Austria, since Emperor Francis I kept the reins of power tightly to himself.

After the Napoleonic Wars, Austrian finances urgently required attention. The paper money issued amounted to ƒ700 million, but at least a portion of this disappeared from circulation and was replaced by specie. By 1830, there was even the prospect of a surplus in the treasury. This situation brought to the fore the question of whether or not the government should be representative, for to maintain the partially achieved financial order, the participation of the public in financial management was needed, as well as confidence that the ministries would not overstep their budgets. The future of Austria lay in the solution of this question, for the financial element comprised much more important affairs. But those near the throne did not want to see the solution of the financial question turn into a question of a constitution — yet that was its essence.

The French July Revolution of 1830 heightened the tension in the various classes of the population. In 1832, Pillersdorf, who thought that concerns about conflict with the new government in France should not frustrate attempts to bring more order to Austria's finances, was taken away from finances and moved to the chancellery, where he became a privy councillor (Geheimrat) on the inner track of the government. A new field opened itself to him where no skilled hand had been on the plough since the reign of Emperor Joseph II. All kinds of weeds needed to be pulled, and obstacles removed, in order to create a foundation for public welfare which until now had not been allowed to develop. As stubbornly as the current order was maintained, so public discontent with it became greater. Even patriotic men faced with a sort of longing the storm that rose up from the French July Monarchy and unleashed itself on Austria.

In the Revolutions of 1848, the brittle government collapsed. On 13 March, Prince Metternich resigned. Pillersdorf became Minister of the Interior under Count Kolowrat on 20 March and submitted the Pillersdorf Constitution on 25 April. He was appointed Minister-President on 4 May. If he had hoped for a moment to be able to calmly and gradually reorganise the government, everything conspired against his honest intention — the turmoil in Lombardy and Hungary, the unrest in Vienna, and relations with the states of the German Confederation. The unexpected flight of Emperor Ferdinand I made it an affair of honour for the prime minister not to resign, and Pillersdorf remained true to his post. He held fast to the concessions made by the crown, but the resistance he offered to constantly emerging new demands was too weak. He avoided the summoning of the government's sources of influence. In the meantime, public affairs came into such confusion and disarray, and Pillersdorf showed himself so little suited to manage them and create order, that finally on 8 July he resigned.

Pillersdorf then was elected as a deputy of the Imperial Diet at Kremsier, which was constituted on 22 July. Here, he took his place centre-right with the men who earnestly wanted to support the new government. Never was there a vote in which he did not take the government's side. When the Reichstag was dissolved in 1849, Pillersdorf's ministerial activity, as well as his behavior during the days of September leading to the Vienna Uprising, became the subject of a disciplinary investigation. Pillersdorf's efforts during his career were directed, as he himself said, toward "reinforcing the power and prestige of the government and instilling confidence in it by avoiding motives for dissatisfaction through suggestions for peaceful reforms."

Pillersdorf went into deep seclusion. His lot was to stand, "not amongst those who had been judged, but among those who had been shamed." But his fellow citizens sought to heal these wounds: when constitutional government returned to Austria in 1861, they confidently called him to the newly established Reichsrat house of representatives. The old man, who had reached the end of his days, took up the mandate with joyful readiness and uprightly performed the duties of his office as head of the finance committee until his death in the following year.

== Honours ==
- Order of Saint Stephen of Hungary

Political offices
Preceded by Count Karl Ludwig von Ficquelmont	Minister-President of the Austrian Empire; 1848	Succeeded by Baron Anton von Doblhoff-Dier
Preceded by Count Franz Anton von Kolowrat-Liebsteinsky	Interior Minister of the Austrian Empire; 1848	Succeeded by Baron Anton von Doblhoff-Dier
