= Giovanni Battista Spangher =

Italian politician

Von Johann Spangher

District Commissioner of Gorizia, Monfalcone and Aquileia
- In office 30 November 1848 – 29 July 1852
- Prime Minister: Anton Strahobach
- Deputy: Franz Smolka

Member of the Reichstag
- In office 30 November 1848 – 6 February 1849
- Prime Minister: Anton Strahobach
- Deputy: Franz Smolka
- Preceded by: Karl Catinelli
- Succeeded by: Karl Doljak

Personal details
- Born: Giovanni Battista Spangher; 24 May 1802 Villesse, Austrian Empire
- Died: 29 June 1852 (aged 50) Villesse, Austrian Empire
- Party: Zentral Klub
- Education: University of Padova
- Occupation: Judge, lawyer, entrepreneur
- Website: Johann Spangher

Johann Spangher (Villesse, 24 May 1802 – Villesse, 29 July 1852) was an Italian politician, judge and irredentist.

== Biography ==
G.B Spangher was born in Villesse, a small town near Gorizia, from G.B. Spangar and from Vecchi Pasqua. The family was well off and practiced mercantile activity. He married in 1842 with Orsola Vianello, daughter of Giuseppe and Giuditta Venier, exponent of a noble family of the Venetian patriciate, from which he had in 1852 Cav.Giovanni Spangher (who then embarked on a brilliant career within Credito Italiano). He transmitted the patriotic ideals to his son who was later condemned to death because he refused to fight in the Austrian army (as he considered himself an Italian citizen).

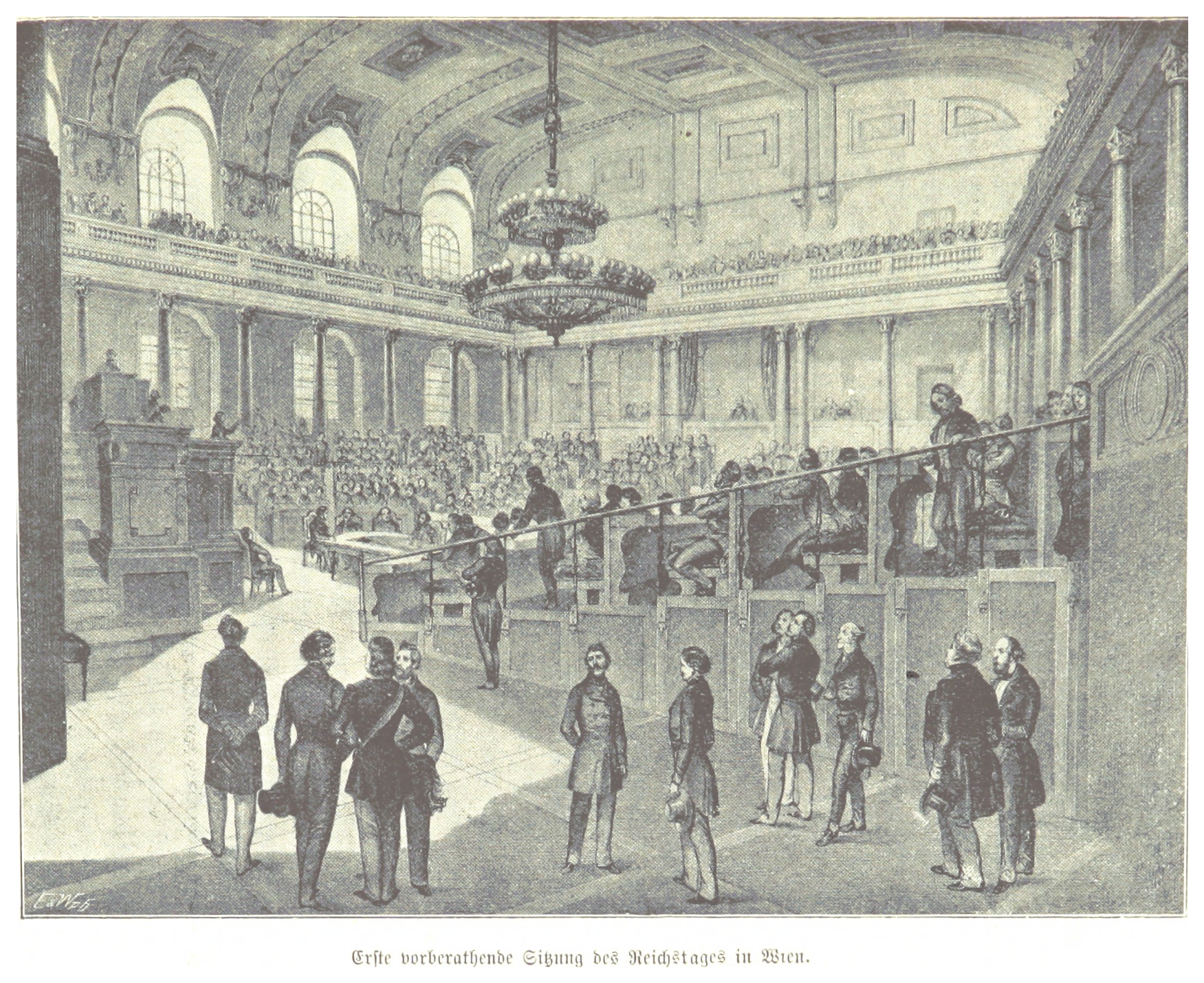
Reichstag in the 1848

After completing his law studies, he worked as a lawyer and judge in Gorizia, Monfalcone, Aquileia and Grandisca. On 30 November 1848 he was elected to the first Austrian democratic parliament after the revolutions of March 1848, where he remained in office until February 1849. He took part in the great renewal approved in parliament towards the end of 1848 which released from the point of economic view the proletarians from the noble landowners, ending to decades of infighting. In the 1850s he started and financed the project to complete the bell tower of the church of San Rocco in Villesse. Giovanni Battista died suddenly in his hometown in 1852.

== Bibliography ==
- Das heilige Geistspital zu Freising: eine Gelegenheitsschrift Di Johann B. Prechtl.
- Archive of the Austrian Parliament.
- Protokoll der ... Sitzung der constituirenden Reichsversammlung.
- Verhandlungen des österreichischen Reichstages nach der ..., Volume 4 Di Austria. Reichstag.
