= Pillersdorf Constitution =

1848 constitution in the Austrian Empire

The Pillersdorf Constitution (German: Pillersdorfsche Verfassung) was a constitution of the Austrian Empire that was promulgated by Minister of the Interior Baron Pillersdorf on 25 April 1848. It called for public, oral, and jury trials.

It only lasted until 16 May when it was replaced for a call for a constitutional convention and completely withdrawn in July when the Kremsier Parliament was elected. The Kremsier Parliament created the Kremsier Constitution, which was preempted by the imposed March Constitution between 4 March and 7 March 1849 after which the Kremsier Parliament was dissolved. The March Constitution was revoked by the New Year's Eve Patent (Silvesterpatent) of Emperor Franz Joseph I on 31 December 1851.
