= Federal Constitutional Law =

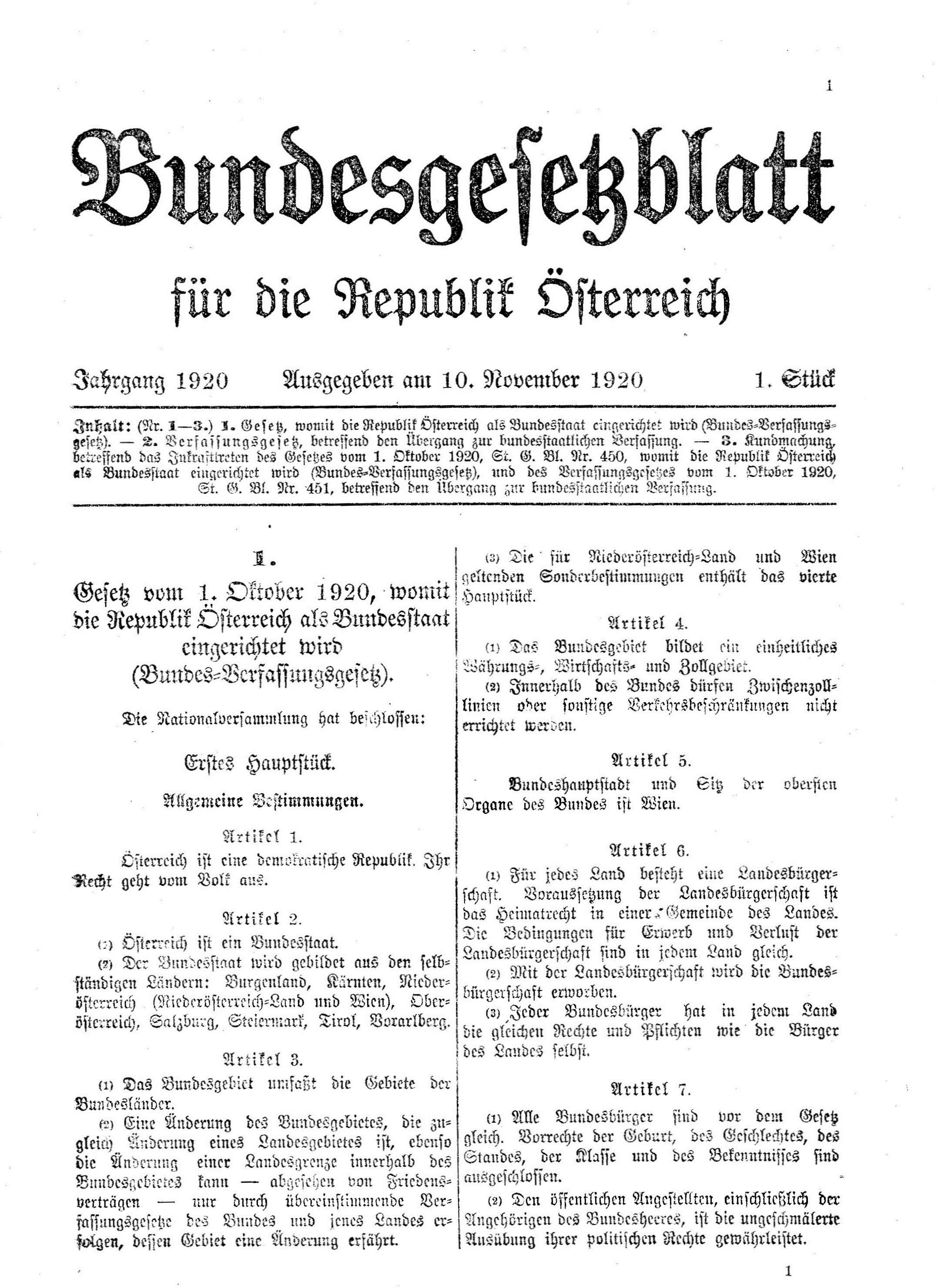
- Promulgation of the Constitution in the Federal Law Gazette (1920)

Overview
- Jurisdiction: Republic of Austria
- Created: 1 October 1920
- Date effective: 10 November 1920
- Location: State Archives Building
- Commissioned by: Constituent National Assembly
- Author: Hans Kelsen

The Federal Constitutional Law (German: Bundes-Verfassungsgesetz, abbreviated B-VG) is a federal constitutional law in Austria serving as the centerpiece of the Constitution. It establishes Austria as a democratic federal parliamentary republic.

The Law was drafted following the 1918 collapse of Austria-Hungary and was promulgated in 1920. It underwent significant revisions in 1925 and 1929, the latter reform changing the system of government from purely parliamentary to semi-presidential. The Law was superseded by the authoritarian Ständestaat constitution in 1934, which itself became void with the 1938 incorporation of Austria into Nazi Germany. It was reestablished when the nation regained independence from Germany in 1945. The Law was fully restored to force with the end of the Allied occupation in 1955 and has remained in force ever since.

== Content ==
=== System of government ===
The Federal Constitutional Law stipulates a bicameral parliament as the national legislature, the two chambers being the National Council and the Federal Council (Article 24). Law is created by the National Council. The Federal Council has certain veto powers, but can be overruled by a National Council supermajority on most matters (Art. 41, 42).

Members of the National Council are chosen in nationwide free elections with universal suffrage. The Law does not prescribe any particular voting system. Austria has consistently been using party-list proportional representation, but nothing in the Federal Constitutional Law prevents the legislature from moving, for example, to single-member legislative districts with first-past-the-post voting. National Council elections are held at least once every five years. (Art. 26)

Members of the Federal Council are chosen by the federal states, seats being apportioned to the states according to population (Art. 34).

Executive power lies with the President and the cabinet (Art. 19). The president is elected in a nationwide free election using a simple two-round system. The president's term of office is six years (Art. 60). In theory, it is the president who chooses the cabinet (Art. 70). As a practical matter, a cabinet that does not command the confidence of the National Council is effectively unable to govern; the National Council controls the budget and has extensive monitoring and supervisory rights (Art. 51–55).

=== Checks and balances ===
The National Council can submit parliamentary inquiries that cabinet members are required to answer; its standing committees can summon cabinet members or bureaucrats for questioning and demand to inspect executive branch paperwork (Art. 52). It can form special parliamentary investigation committees with sweeping powers (Art. 53). As a matter of simple law, the National Council can also make acts of government subject to National Council assent that the constitution places in the executive purview (Art. 55).

The National Council can force the president to dismiss the cabinet, or specific individual cabinet members, through a vote of no confidence (Art. 74). In concert with the Federal Council, it can also impeach the President before the Constitutional Court (Art. 142) or call for a referendum to have the President removed by the electorate (Art. 60).

The president can dissolve the National Council (Art. 29)

The president can also dissolve state legislatures upon the advice on the cabinet. (Art. 100)

Legislative and administrative acts of government are subject to judicial review. The Constitutional Court reviews statutes and secondary legislation, striking laws and regulations it deems unconstitutional (Art. 137). The Constitutional Court also resolves demarcation conflicts between other courts, between courts and the executive branch, or between the national government and the states (Art. 138). A system of Administrative Courts reviews executive acts (Art. 129).

=== Defense ===
The Austrian army is a militia (Art. 79).

=== Regional autonomy ===
The republic established by the Federal Constitutional Law is an unusual hybrid of federal and unitary state. The country's provinces are defined to be "federal states" (Bundesländer) but have neither their own judiciaries (Art. 82) nor their own law enforcement structures in general (Art 78a). They also do not have any significant legislative authority. All courts are "federal" courts. All police departments answer to the "federal" ministry of the interior, all prosecutors to the "federal" ministry of justice. Most legislation of everyday relevance, from family law to trade regulation and from education to the criminal code, is in the "federal" purview (Art. 10–15).

The provinces do have substantial executive responsibilities, however. Much of the nation's executive powers and duties are discharged through its system of district administrative authorities, which are "state" rather than "federal" institutions according to the Federal Constitutional Law. The national government decides who can apply for a marriage permit, for example, but when actually applying for one the resident is interacting with a province employee in a province facility.

The provinces have some limited ability to collect their own taxes and could in theory issue their own bonds, but these powers are severely circumscribed and do not result in meaningful fiscal autonomy. Only the national government can raise payroll taxes, capital gains taxes, corporate taxes, value-added taxes, or inheritance taxes, or tax real estate and other forms of property. The provinces, accordingly, depend on money doled out to them by the national government to meet even basic obligations.

=== Bill of rights ===
The Federal Constitutional Law demands that Austria be governed according to the rule of law (Art. 18), prescribes the separation of judiciary and administration (Art. 94), and guarantees judicial independence (Art. 87). It also prescribes equality regardless of class, gender, or confession for Austrian nationals (Art. 7). It does not include a comprehensive bill of rights, however, nor does it demand any kind of equality before the law extending to visitors and residents who are not citizens.

The Republic of Austria originally continued to rely on the 1867 Imperial Basic Law on the General Rights of Nationals as its main charter of civil liberties and procedural guarantees, the framers of the new constitution being unable to agree on anything to replace it. The situation first fundamentally changed in 1955. As a condition of having the allied occupation lifted and being restored to full sovereignty, Austria had to commit itself to upholding human rights, including but not limited to modern forms of freedom of religion and freedom of the press. It also had to guarantee modern forms of equality, including full civil rights for its Croat and Slovenian minorities, which had historically been discriminated against. Stipulated in the Austrian State Treaty and thus commitments under international law, these promises cannot be rescinded by simple acts of parliament and are therefore implicitly part of the supreme law of the land.

In 1958, Austria ratified the European Convention on Human Rights; in 1964, the Convention became part of Austrian constitutional law as well.

=== Entrenchment ===
The National Council can enact constitutional law provided that at least half of the members are present and that at least two thirds of those present vote in favor. A "fundamental" change (Gesamtänderung) to the country's body of constitutional law additionally requires a plebiscite; the bill does not become law unless supported by a simple majority of the electorate. (Art. 44)

== Structure ==
The Law is divided into nine parts (Hauptstücke, an archaic word for "chapters"), most of which are divided into two or more sections.

The structure has a few quirks. For example, the chapter called "Executive" (Vollziehung) covers both the executive and the judicial branches of government, whereas the Court of Audit, a comptrolling office supervising the administration, has a chapter all by itself. Another office that has a chapter to itself is the Ombudsman Board, a powerless bureau of public advocates that mainly serves as a sinecure for aging party loyalists. Wedged between the Court of Audit and the Ombudsman Board is a chapter of provisions regarding the administrative and constitutional courts that were omitted from the Executive chapter for reasons lost to time.

The act's articles used to be numbered sequentially, but frequent deletions and insertions have thrown the numbering into disarray. For example, there are currently only three articles between articles 106 and 115, but there are ten articles between articles 148 and 149: articles 148a through 148j.

| Part | Articles |
| 1. General and European Union-related provisions | |
| A. General provisions | 1–23 |
| B. Austria as a part of the European Union | 23a–23k |
| 2. Federal Legislature | |
| A. National Council | 24–33 |
| B. Federal Council | 34–37 |
| C. Federal Assembly | 38–40 |
| D. Legislative procedure | 41–49a |
| E. Administrative roles of the legislature | 50–59b |
| 3. Federal Administration | |
A. Administration
| 1. President | 60–68 |
| 2. Cabinet | 69–78 |
| 3. Police | 78a–78d |
| 4. Army | 79–81 |
| 5. Schools | 81a–81b |
| 6. Universities | 81c |
| B. Judiciary | 82-94 |
| 4. State Legislature and Administration | |
| A. General provisions | 95–106 |
| B. Vienna | 108–112 |
| 5. Local self-administration | |
| A. Municipalities | 115–120 |
| B. Other structures | 120a–120c |
| 6. Court of Audit | 121–128 |
| 7. Procedural guarantees | |
| A. Administrative courts | 129–136 |
| B. Constitutional court | 137–148 |
| 8. Ombudsman board | 148a–148j |
| 9. Final provisions | 149–152 |

== History ==
=== Genesis ===
Between 1867 and 1918, the territories that make up modern Austria were part of the Cisleithanian half of Austria-Hungary. As such, they were governed according to the December Constitution, a set of five "Basic Laws" (Staatsgrundgesetze) characterizing Cisleithania as a constitutional monarchy. The monarchy collapsed in October 1918 as a result of long-standing disaffection between the ethnicities that made up the multi-national empire, exacerbated by the outcome of World War I. Breaking away from the empire, its former provinces were in the process of forming modern nation states. On 21 October 1918, parliamentarians from the German-speaking regions of the exploding empire assembled to form a Provisional National Assembly (Provisorische Nationalversammlung) to manage this transition for their collective constituencies.

By 30 October, the Provisional National Assembly had proclaimed a provisional constitution for their emerging rump state. The provisional constitution did little more than establish the Assembly as a provisional parliament, establish the parliament's three-member presidium as the provisional head of state, and set up a provisional cabinet. The act did not include any catalogue of basic rights, although it was followed on the same day by a resolution abolishing censorship and establishing freedom of the press. It also did not undertake to create any administrative subdivisions, define any permanent branches of government, or even stipulate the electoral rules pursuant to which it was to be replaced. Most notably, it also did not define Austria to be either a monarchy or a republic, or even a sovereign state: some members were still loyal to the Habsburg dynasty, some were in favor of an independent republic; some were in favor of a joining Germany, should Germany become a republic.

The question was resolved by 11 November: the German Emperor had been ousted, Germany had declared itself a republic, the Austrian Emperor had abdicated. On 12 November, the Assembly passed a proclamation establishing Austria as a republic, de facto sovereign for the time being but de jure part of Germany. Since Austria was going to join Germany, promulgating a comprehensive new constitution was not a priority.

When the 1919 Treaty of Saint Germain prohibited the union of Germany and Austria, Austria had to go to work on a permanent constitution in earnest, but was deeply divided on numerous issues. General elections on 16 February 1919 replaced the Provisional Assembly with a Constitutional Assembly (Konstituierende Nationalversammlung). The new parliament was dominated by Social Democrats, who favored a unitary state with a strong central government, and the Christian Social Party, who fought for a federation devolving significant authority to regional governments. Unable to reach consensus, the parties chose to defer the decision. The new constitution, passed on 1 October and formally published on 5 October 1920, stipulated that Austria was to be a parliamentary federal republic consisting of eight (at the time) federal states, but did not state which powers and duties would lie with the national government and which ones with the states.

Another thing the Assembly could not reach consensus on was a new bill of rights. The 1867 Basic Law on the General Rights of Nationals, part of the Imperial December Constitution, remained on the books as a core part of Austria's corpus of constitutional law.

=== First reform ===
The question of how to distribute responsibilities between national government and provincial governments was resolved in 1925. As a consequence, the Federal Constitutional Law underwent its first material revision. The 1925 version stipulates that legislative authority is concentrated with the "federal" parliament but that "state" governments have significant roles to play in the administration of the country. In particular, district administrative authorities were transformed from "federal" to "state" institutions. District offices are the primary point of contact between resident and government for most matters exceeding municipal purview, meaning that the executive branches of the province governments are carrying out a large fraction of the tasks of the executive branch of the national government.

=== Second reform ===
The republic established by the original 1920 B-VG was radically parliamentarian in nature. The President was elected by and answerable to the National Assembly and was essentially a figurehead; the president neither appointed the cabinet nor had the reserve power to dissolve the National Council. The National Council chose the cabinet on a motion from its principal committee. The drafters of the original Act chose this system of government with the stated intent of preventing the President from becoming an "ersatz emperor." In fact, the mere existence of the office of President was a compromise; the Social Democrats would have preferred to have the president of the National Council act as ex officio head of state.

Pressured by authoritarian movements demanding a move to a presidential system, Austria greatly enhanced both the formal powers and the prestige of the office in a reform enacted in 1929 and in force starting in 1930. From now on, the President would be elected directly by the people. The term of office was increased from four to six years. The President would appoint the cabinet. While the National Council would be able to force the President to dismiss the cabinet, this ability would be a reserve power, to be used only in emergencies. At the same time, the President would now have the reciprocal reserve power to dismiss the National Council.

=== Abrogation ===
By 1933, the Christian Social Party had become an authoritarian movement bent on disestablishing multi-party democracy. On 4 March 1933, a contested National Council vote precipitated a series of quarrels that caused all three presidents of the chamber to resign their offices, one by one. The code of parliamentary procedure made no provision for a National Council with no presidents; the session disbanded without having been properly closed and with no clear way forward. Seeing his chance, Christian Social Chancellor Engelbert Dollfuss declared that the National Council had rendered itself inoperative and that the cabinet would assume its responsibilities. His self-coup had the color of law due to a 1917 act granting certain legislative powers to the then-Imperial cabinet. Originally meant as a temporary measure to help the nation deal with wartime economic trouble, the act was never formally repealed. Police prevented the National Council from reconvening.

The cabinet spent the next months abolishing freedom of the press, bringing back Catholicism as the state religion and enacting other repressive measures. The Constitutional Court was crippled to the point that it was in no position to intervene. The Heimwehr, a reactionary paramilitary force that supported Dolfuss, provoked the Social Democrats into four days of skirmishes in February 1934 that ultimately resulted in a Heimwehr victory. On 24 April 1934, his power secured, Dolfuss drafted a new constitution that replaced the Republic of Austria with the Federal State of Austria, a clerico-fascist one-party state. The constitution was affirmed in a specially convened assembly of the Christian Social members of the National Council on 30 April and went into force on 1 May.

=== Reestablishment ===
In April 1945, the German Reich in the final stages of collapse and Fascism in both its German and its Austrian incarnation thoroughly discredited, Austria's pre-1933 political parties began reconstituting themselves. On 27 April, leaders of the three major factions issued a Proclamation on the Independence of Austria. In Article 1, the Proclamation stated that Austria was to be rebuilt "in the spirit of the constitution of 1920." On the same day, the parties formed a Provisional Government (Provisorische Staatsregierung), a committee that would act as both cabinet and legislature until constitutional structures would haven been reestablished and elections could be held.

On 1 May the Provisional Government enacted the Constitution Transition Act (Verfassungs-Überleitungsgesetz) reestablishing the Federal Constitutional Law in its 1929 revision. The Act explicitly rescinded all constitutional law proclaimed by both the Austrofascist and the Nazi regime. For the time being, the Act was largely symbolic, however: in the same breath, the Government enacted a Provisional Constitution (Vorläufige Verfassung) that reconfirmed the Government's dual role as the country's supreme administrative and supreme legislative authority. It also "temporarily" readopted a number of province border changes made by Nazi Germany and ostensibly nullified by the Government just minutes earlier. Most notably, the Provisional Constitution confirmed that the provinces were "states" but denied them the authority to form their own provincial legislatures. Even this second act was mostly symbolic. Austria was in the process of being occupied by the Allies; it was obvious to all concerned that for the foreseeable future any act of government would be subject to approval by the Allied occupation administration.

On 25 November, Austria elected a new National Council. Since a separate presidential election was not yet considered feasible, it was decided that the first President of the Second Austrian Republic would be elected by the Federal Assembly pursuant to the provisions of the 1920 version of the Federal Constitutional Act. On 13 December, the Provisional Government passed a second Transition Act that reestablished the Federal Council and stipulated that the Provisional Constitution would become void as soon as the two Councils had convened for their first sessions, chosen their presiding officers, and installed a president. By 20 December these conditions had been met, and the Federal Constitutional Law had thus gone back into full force.

Up until June 1946, bills passed by the National Council still needed the unanimous assent of the occupation administration to become law. In an agreement signed on 28 June, the Allies eased this restriction; Austria was now allowed to proclaim laws that had not been vetoed by all four Allied commissioners within 31 days of having been passed. Only changes to constitutional law remained subject to stricter scrutiny.

Following the ratification of the Austrian State Treaty, Austria regained full sovereignty on 25 July 1955.

=== Accession to the European Union ===
In early 1994, Austria and the European Union concluded negotiations regarding accession of the former to the latter. The accession would make Austria subject to a complex network of international treaties that would deprive it, de facto if not immediately de jure, of part of its independence. The accession would therefore require a change to the country's constitution; this being a "fundamental" change (Gesamtänderung), it would also require approval by the electorate. The National Council passed the necessary act on 5 May 1994, and the people approved the act in a plebiscite on 12 June.

== Source texts ==
- Full text of the Federal Constitutional Law on the web site of the Chancellery
- Full text as of 1 January 2014, with English translation on the Chancellery web site

== Literature ==
- Olechowski, Thomas (2020): Hans Kelsen: Biographie eines Rechtswissenschaftlers. Mohr Siebeck. Tübingen, Germany. ISBN 978-3-16-159292-8. pages 271-305.
- Öhlinger, Theo and Eberhard, Harald (2014): Verfassungsrecht. 9., überarbeitete Auflage. Facultas. Vienna, Austria. ISBN 978-3-7089-0844-1
- Ucakar, Karl and Gschiedl, Stefan (2011): Das politische System Österreichs und die EU. 3. Auflage. Facultas. Vienna, Austria. ISBN 978-3-7089-0838-0
- Mayer, Heinz et al. (2007). Grundriss des österreichischen Bundesverfassungsrechts. 10. Auflage. Manz. Wien, Austria. ISBN 978-3-214-08888-0
- Pernthaler, Peter (2004): Österreichisches Bundesstaatsrecht. Lehr- und Handbuch. Verlag Österreich. Vienna, Austria. ISBN 3-7046-4361-0
- Schärf, Adolf (1950). Zwischen Demokratie und Volksdemokratie. Verlag der Wiener Volksbuchhandlung. Vienna, Austria. No ISBN.
