= Franz Anton von Kolowrat-Liebsteinsky =

Austrian statesman (1778–1861)

Hochgeboren Franz Anton Graf von Kolowrat-Liebsteinsky
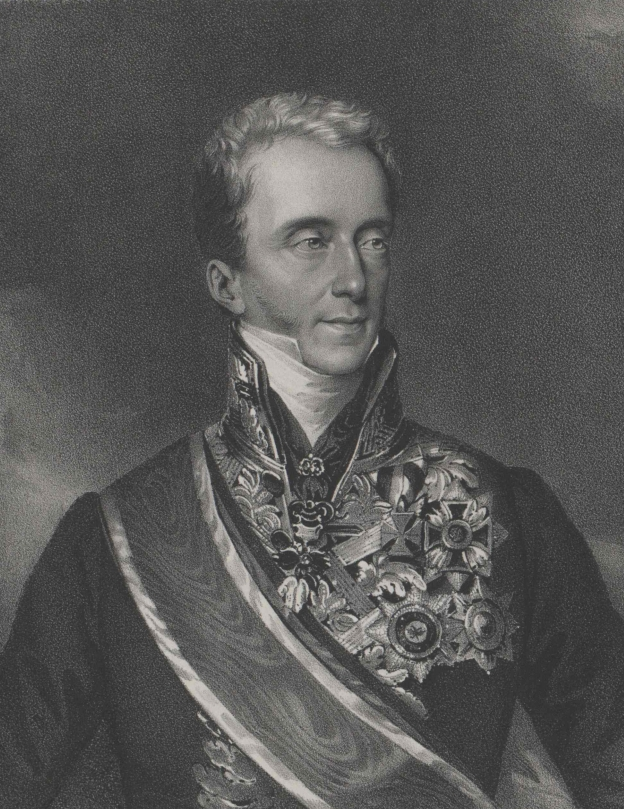
- Lithograph after a portrait by Johann Ender

Minister-President of the Austrian Empire
- In office 20 March 1848 – 19 April 1848
- Monarch: Ferdinand I
- Preceded by: Klemens von Metternich as Chancellor
- Succeeded by: Karl Ludwig von Ficquelmont

Interior Minister of the Austrian Empire
- In office 29 September 1826 – 20 March 1848
- Succeeded by: Franz von Pillersdorf

Personal details
- Born: 31 January 1778 Prague, Bohemia
- Died: 4 April 1861 (aged 83) Vienna, Austria
- Spouse: Countess Maria Rosa Johanna Kinsky von Wchinitz und Tettau

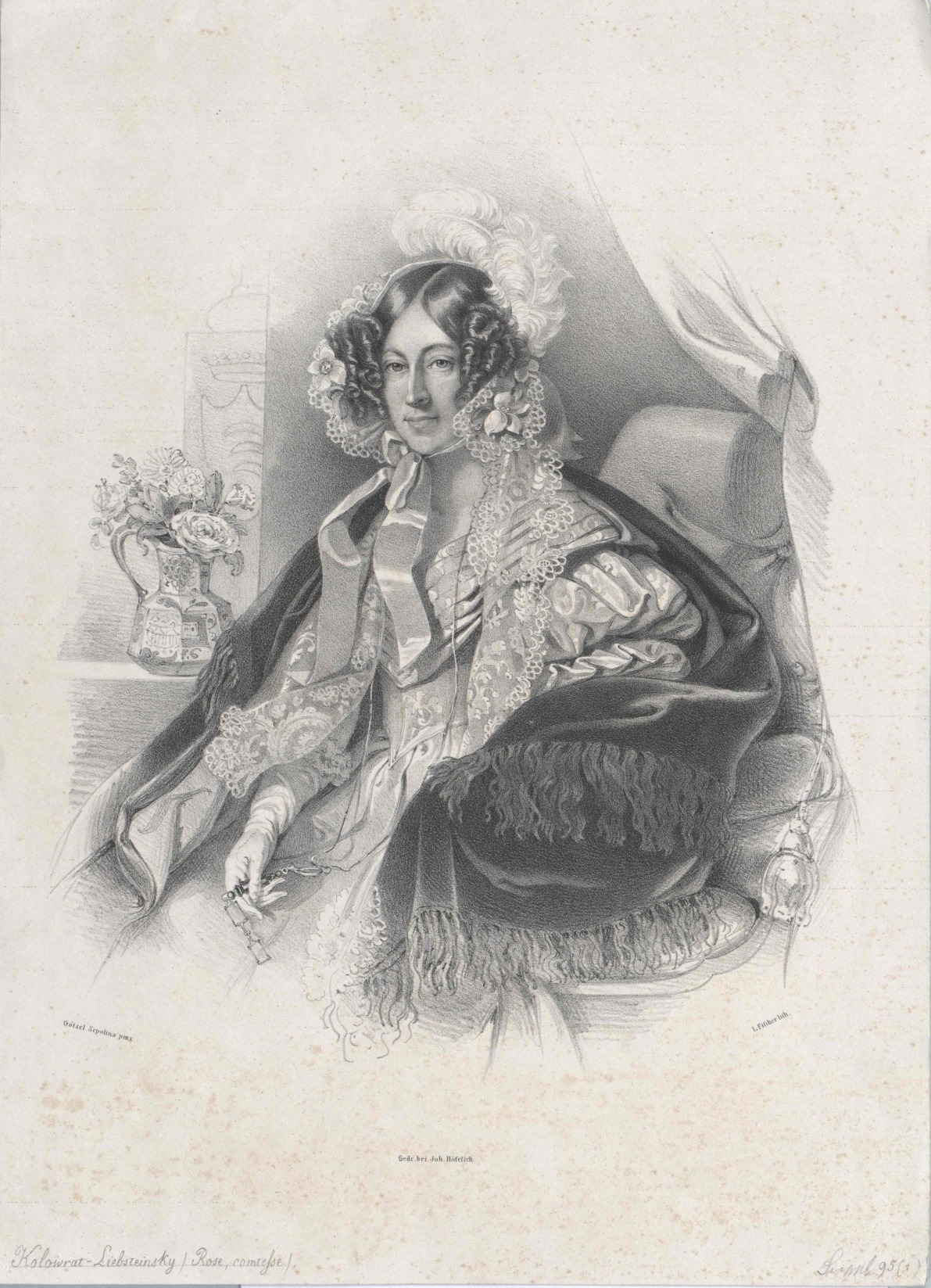
Franz Anton's wife: Countess Marie Rosa Johanna Kinsky von Wchinitz und Tettau (1780-1842)

Count Franz Anton von Kolowrat-Liebsteinsky (Czech: František Antonín Kolovrat-Libštejnský; 31 January 1778 – 4 April 1861) was a Bohemian noble and Austrian statesman from the House of Kolowrat. As a moderate liberal politician, he was one of the major opponents of State Chancellor Prince Klemens von Metternich during the Vormärz era. In the March Revolution of 1848, Kolowrat became the first constitutional Minister-President of Austria; however, he resigned after one month in office.

== Life ==
He was born as the only son of Count Franz Josef von Kolowrat-Liebsteinsky (1747-1825) and his wife, Countess Maria Katharina von Kolowrat-Krakowsky (1748-1812). Raised in the Bohemian capital Prague, he was a scion of the Liebsteinsky branch of the House of Kolowrat, an ancient Bohemian family of high nobility, whose ancestors had already served under the Luxembourg emperor Charles IV. Having finished his studies at Charles University, Franz Anton entered the Austrian civil service at the Beroun district administration in January 1799. During the Napoleonic Wars he achieved the office of a stadtholder of the Habsburg emperor Francis I of Austria at Prague and in 1810 became Oberstburggraf of the Bohemian kingdom. Contrary to Chancellor Metternich, he encouraged Czech cultural and civic-national movements, exemplified by the founding of the Prague National Museum in 1818.

Kolowrat's rivalry with Metternich intensified when in 1826 the emperor called him to Vienna, where he was elevated to lead the Austrian State Council responsible for the Interior and Finances. The tensions between him and the chancellor continued: while Metternich favored a strong army, Kolowrat reduced the military budget. After the accession of Francis' incapable son Ferdinand I to the throne in 1835, Kolowrat together with Metternich led the Secret State Conference, the de facto government of the Empire from 1836 to 1848. However, the continuous disagreement between the two leaders palsied the Austrian politics and ultimately contributed to collapse of the "Metternich system".

Upon the outbreak of the Revolutions of 1848, Metternich had to resign. A ministers' conference was established and Kolowrat assumed the newly created office of an Austrian minister-president, which he nevertheless laid down after only one month between 3–5 April, officially for health reasons.

On 8 June 1801 Franz Anton married Countess Maria Rosa Johanna Kinsky von Wchinitz und Tettau (1780-1842), second eldest daughter of Prince Joseph Ernst Kinsky von Wchinitz und Tettau (1751-1798) and his wife, Countess Maria Rosa von Harrach (1758-1814). The marriage remained childless. After her death, Kolowrat retired to private life; he died in Vienna aged 83, outliving both his wife and sisters. With his death, the Liebsteinsky branch of the Kolowrat dynasty became extinct. He was buried in the Holy Trinity Church at his ancestral castle in Rychnov nad Kněžnou.

== Decorations ==
- Order of the Golden Fleece
- Order of Leopold
- Order of St. Andrew
- Order of St. Anna
- Order of St. Vladimir
- Order of the White Eagle
- Order of Alexander Nevsky
- Venerable Order of Saint John

Preceded by Klemens von Metternich (State Chancellor)	Minister-President of the Austrian Empire; 1848	Succeeded by Karl Ludwig von Ficquelmont
Preceded by Károly Zichy	Minister of State of the Austrian Empire for the Interior; 1826–1848	Succeeded by Franz von Pillersdorf
