= Imperial Diet (Austria) =

1848–9 parliament in the Austrian Empire

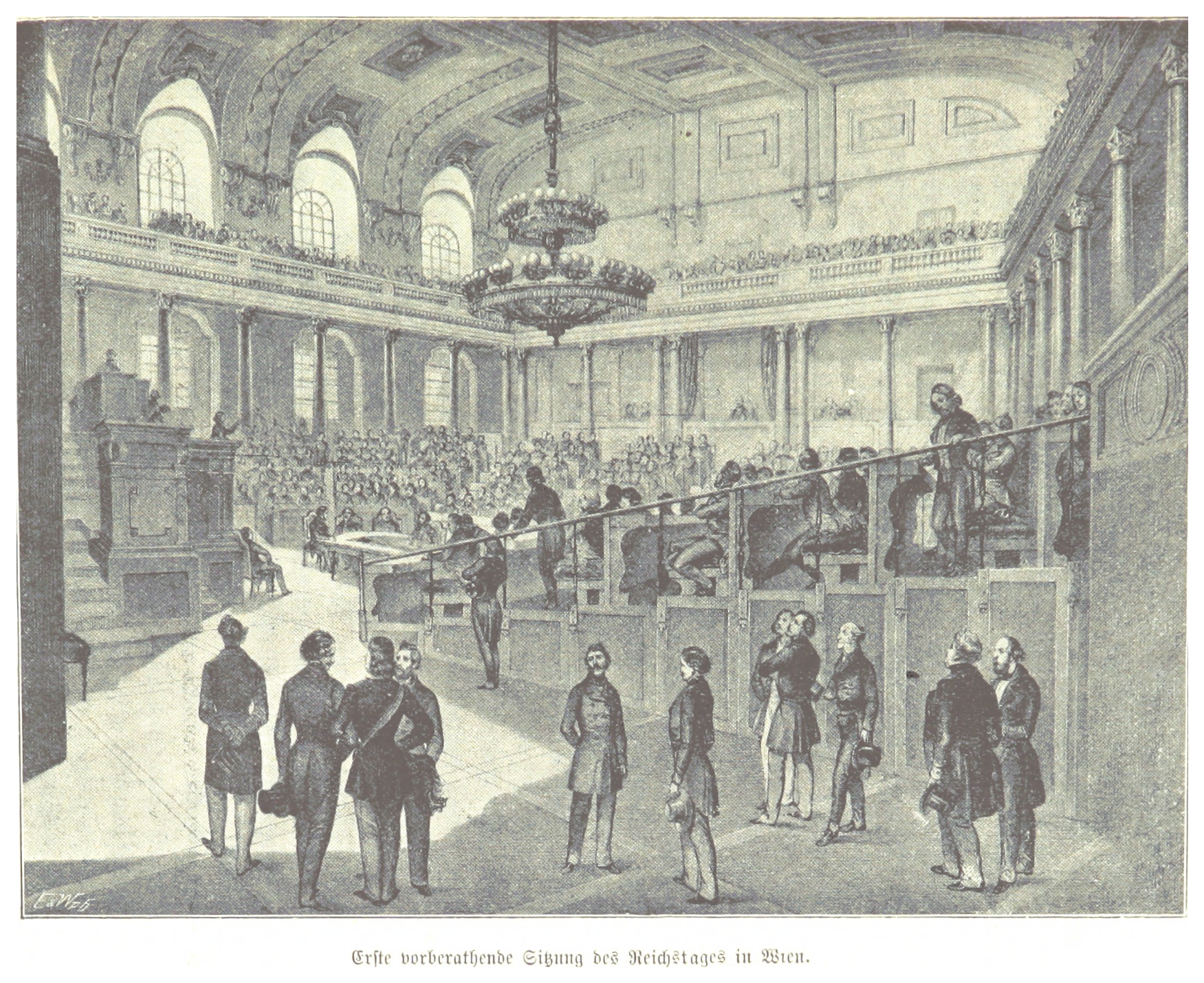
Image extracted from page 517 of Geschichte der Wiener Revolution im Jahre 1848, by Maximilian Bach.

The Reichstag ("Imperial Diet"), also called Kremsier Parliament, was the first elected parliament in the Austrian Empire. It lasted for only a short time between July 1848 and 7 March 1849, but had an important effect on Austrian history. Its main product was the Kremsier Constitution which was preempted by the imposed March Constitution.

Formed after the March Revolution of 1848 and in reaction to opposition to the Pillersdorf Constitution of 25 April 1848. The Diet consisted of 383 deputies from the German-speaking and Slavic crown lands of Habsburg Austria, that is, without representatives from the Kingdom of Hungary. It met for the first time on 22 July 1848 and was opened by Archduke Johann. On 22 October 1848, in the wake of the Vienna Uprising, it relocated to Kremsier and was finally dissolved on 7 March 1849. Its most important work was the abolition of the feudal system.

== Historical background ==
The Kremsier Parliament had been elected in June, and convened in July in reaction to the Pillersdorf Constitution of 25 April 1848. The Kremsier Parliament formerly convened in Vienna but later resided in Kremsier, Moravia, to avoid martial law in Vienna following the Vienna Uprising. Following the popular trend in Europe during the Revolutions of 1848, in October 1848 workers rioted in Vienna for a constitutional monarchy and blockaded the troop transports headed for Hungary. The workers hoped that siding with the Hungarian rebellion would bring military strength to the Viennese workers revolt. However, the revolt was violently crushed by General Windisch-Grätz. With Vienna under martial law, the Assembly decided to move to Kremsier to write the new constitution.

== The Kremsier Assembly ==
The overarching theme of the Assembly's deliberations was the vast array of conflicting nationalities living under the Habsburg monarchy. In the first week of March 1849, the Kremsier Constitution was completed. It featured many liberal and progressive reforms including forming a constitutional monarchy, creating a parliament that would share power with the Emperor, abolishing the privileged status and all titles of the Catholic Church within the Empire, deriving the Emperor's power from the people rather than the "Grace of God", and finally, making all languages and nationalities equal in the eyes of the Monarchy. The Kremsier Constitution was short-lived, however, with Prime Minister Felix Schwarzenberg dissolving the Assembly and nullifying the constitution within days of completing the document (sometime between 4 March 1849 and 6 March 1849 depending on source used).

== Critique of the Assembly ==
Edward Crankshaw raises three major critiques of the Kremsier Assembly in his book, The Fall of the House of Habsburg. First, the constitution claimed that all political power was derived from the people yet it called for a central authority. Could anyone have honestly thought a Habsburg Emperor with central authority vested in him would have been an ideological proponent of and see himself as an extension of a Rousseauan "will of the people"? Is it even possible to understand one's subjects if they come from thirteen major ethnicities? Second, the Assembly had zero representatives from Hungary since the region was in revolt, thus all Hungarian issues were completely ignored. Third, the Assembly failed to take into account the larger picture, meaning there was no acknowledgement of the Frankfurt Parliament's attempts to create a unified Germany (including the German states within Austria) and there was no realization that the Prime Minister, Schwarzenberg, was drawn to the Frankfurt Parliament.

== Reaction to the Kremsier Constitution ==
Following the dissolution of the Assembly, Schwarzenberg had his own constitution drawn up. The new constitution saved only one significant piece of the Kremsier Constitution: vernaculars were permissible at the local levels for all non-political discussion. Besides this stripped version of an article in the Kremsier Constitution, four major points were drawn up in the new constitution: 1) the Emperor was given absolute authority in dealing with the military and foreign policy. 2) Parliament would meet once a year but the Emperor had the power to dismiss them and veto all legislation Parliament passed. 3) the Emperor was equipped with an advisory council of his choosing. 4) German was the official language of the Empire for politics, education, and administration and the Empire was united under one crown, one constitution, and one parliament. As one can see, the progressive movement of the Kremsier Parliament created a devastating backlash against the growing national identities of the Empire. The Empire was now tightly controlled in a neo-absolutist regime with a hostile attitude towards nationalist tendencies.

== 1860s ==
The concept of a Reichstag as representative body of the Austrian people turned up again in the October Diploma of 1860, but this would have required ratification by the various state legislatures of the Austrian Empire, which was not forthcoming.

After the adoption of the February Patent in 1861, another attempt was made to elect a general representative body for the people, mainly from Prime Minister Anton von Schmerling. This, too, failed due to opposition from the Hungarian and Italian, and subsequently, Czech lands of the empire. A rump parliament did serve in a temporary wooden building in the Schmerling Theater in Vienna. This Parliament was named the Reichsrat ("Imperial Council"), because Emperor Francis Joseph I wanted it to serve in only a consultative role. Finally a formalized Reichsrat was created in 1867 and associated with the new constitution of Austria-Hungary on an institutional basis.

== See also ==
- Giovanni Battista Spangher

== Literature ==
- G. Kolmer: Parliament and the Constitution in Austria, Volume 1, 1920.
- W. Braun Eder: Austrian Constitutional History, 11th Edition, 2009.
- Andreas Gottsmann: The Diet of Kromeriz and the Government Schwarzenberg. The constitutional debate of 1848 between the poles of the national question and response. (Wien: Verl. 1995)
