= Kremsier Constitution =

The Kremsier Constitution. also called Kremsier Draft (German: Kremsierer Verfassungsentwurf or Kremsierer Entwurf), was a draft constitution of the Austrian Empire drafted by the Kremsier Parliament from October 1848 to early March 1849. The Kremsier Parliament had moved from Vienna to Kremsier after the failed Vienna Uprising. It was preempted by the imposed March Constitution within days of its publication.

== Contents ==
The Kremsier constitution had a compromise where the delegates agreed that the historical regions of the empire should remain, but that they should be further subdivided along ethnic boundaries. Another compromise would have allowed the monarch only a suspensive veto on legislation, whilst retaining control of the military and foreign policy.
