= March Constitution (Austria) =

1849 constitution in Austrian Empire

The March Constitution, also called Imposed March Constitution or Stadion Constitution (German: Oktroyierte Märzverfassung or Oktroyierte Stadionverfassung, Hungarian: olmützi alkotmány or oktrojált alkotmány), was a constitution of the Austrian Empire promulgated by Minister of the Interior Count Stadion between 4 March and 7 March 1849. Though declared irrevocable, it was eventually revoked by the New Year's Eve Patent (Silvesterpatent) of Emperor Franz Joseph I on 31 December 1851. The Stadion Constitution emphasized power for the monarch; it also marked the way of the neo-absolutism in the Habsburg ruled territories. It preempted the Kremsier Constitution of the Kremsier Parliament. This state of affairs would last until the October Diploma of 20 October 1860 and the later February Patent of 26 February 1861.

== Hungary ==
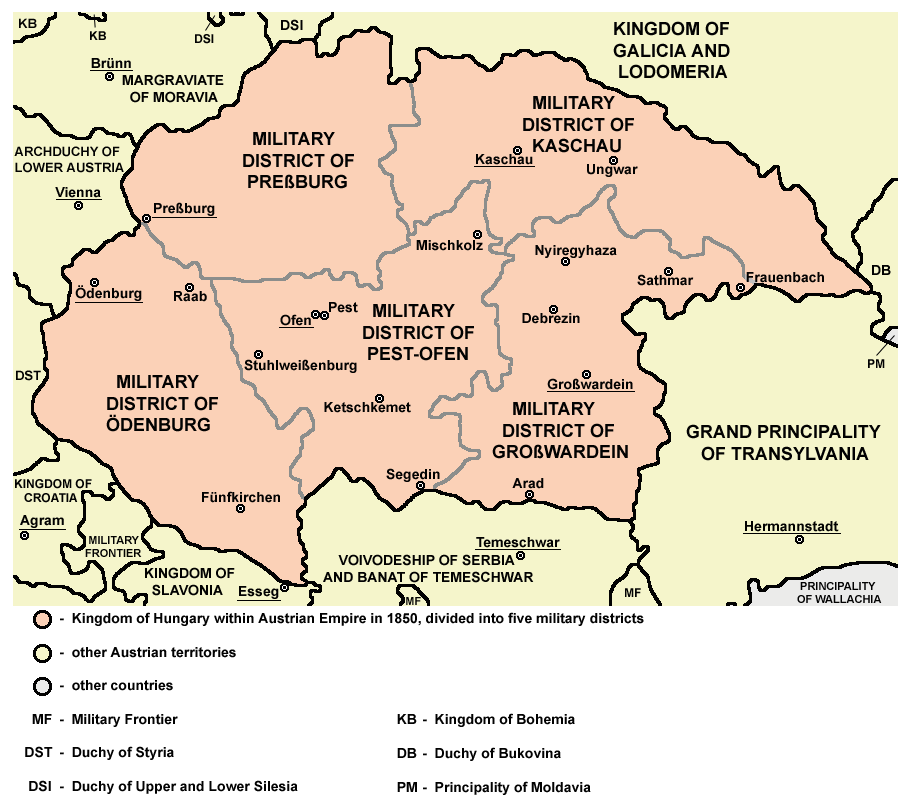
Hungary was divided into five military districts, Transylvania was also separated. The order was executed in 1850

Franz Joseph, at that time the freshly appointed Emperor of Austria, refused to accept the reforms of the Hungarian April laws, and so he revoked them. This could be seen as an unconstitutional act, because the laws had already been signed by his predecessor Ferdinand, and the monarch had no right to revoke parliamentary laws that were already signed. However, unlike his uncle who was bound by the oaths he had sworn, Franz Joseph had sworn no oaths to Hungary, and so was not subject to the limitations imposed on Ferdinand.

The March Constitution reclaimed Habsburg power after the concessions it had made during the Revolutions of 1848. The constitution was accepted by the Imperial Diet of Austria. The March Constitution also tried to abolish the Diet of Hungary and the historical constitution of Hungary. The revoking of the Hungarian April Laws and reduction of Hungary's territory and traditional status prompted a renewal of the Hungarian Revolution.

On 7 March 1849 an imperial proclamation issued in the name of Emperor Francis Joseph established a united constitution for the empire. According to the proclamation, the traditional territory of the Kingdom of Hungary would be carved up and administered by five separated military districts, while the Principality of Transylvania would be reestablished. These events represented an existential threat for the Hungarian state, and contributed to the renewal of the Hungarian revolution.

The Stadion constitution abolished Hungary’s separate constitutional statehood and reduced the Hungarian state to the status of a typical Habsburg province/crownland within a centralized Austrian Empire.

=== Legitimacy problems of Franz Joseph in Hungary ===
From a legal point of view, according to the coronation oath, a crowned Hungarian king could not abdicate the throne during his life. If the king was alive and unable to do his duty as ruler, a regent had to undertake the royal duties. Constitutionally, his uncle Ferdinand V remained the legal king of Hungary. If there was no possibility to inherit the throne automatically due to the death of the predecessor king (King Ferdinand was still alive), but the monarch wanted to relinquish his throne and appoint another king before his death, technically only one legal solution remained: the parliament had the power to dethrone the king and elect his successor as the new king. Due to the legal and military tensions, the Hungarian parliament did not offer that favor to Franz Joseph. This event gave an excuse to the revolt. "From this time until the collapse of the revolution, Lajos Kossuth (as elected regent-president) became the de facto and de jure ruler of Hungary."

== See also ==
- Kremsier Constitution
