= Elisabeth Lovrek =

Austrian jurist, incumbent President of the Supreme Court of Justice

President of the Supreme Court of Justice
- In office 1 July 2018 – 31 December 2023
- Preceded by: Eckart Ratz
- Succeeded by: Georg Kodek

Vice President of the Supreme Court of Justice
- In office 2015 – 1 July 2018
- President: Eckart Ratz
- Succeeded by: position vacant

Personal details
- Born: 31 December 1958 (age 66); Vienna, Austria

Elisabeth Lovrek (born 31 December 1958) is an Austrian jurist and lawyer who has served as the president of the Supreme Court of Justice from 2018 until 2023. She previously was one of the court's Vice Presidents.
