= Judicial review in Austria =

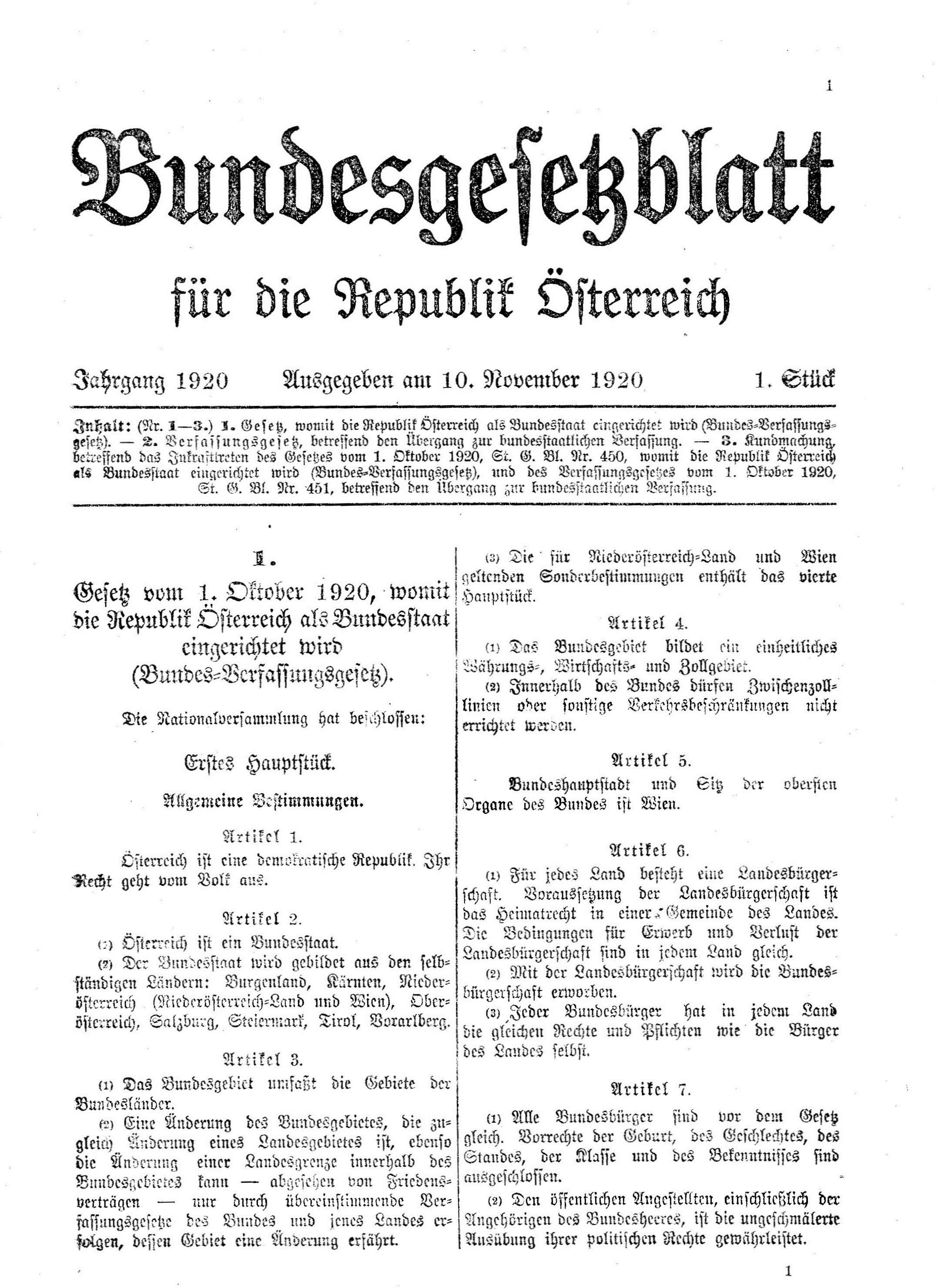
The 1920 Federal Constitutional Law established judicial review of legislation in Austria

The European and Austrian constitutions endow the Austrian court system with broad powers of judicial review. All Austrian courts are charged with verifying that the statutes and ordinances they are about to apply conform to European Union law, and to refuse to apply them if not. A specialized Constitutional Court checks statutes for compliance with the Austrian constitution and executive ordinances for compliance with Austrian law in general.

A system of administrative courts reviews individual-scope actions of the executive branch.

Influenced by Hans Kelsen and a general local tradition of legal positivism, the statutory construction of the Austrian Constitutional Court relied mostly on grammatical interpretation from its beginnings in 1920 to the mid-1980s. In the decades since then, the court has increasingly made use of teleological reasoning. Much of the court's workload is due to – and many of its decisions are the product of – unique distinctivenesses of the legal and political framework it is operating in.

== Fundamentals ==
The European Union constitutional framework charges the Austrian court system with checking Austrian statutes and ordinances for compliance with Union law. Austrian legislation, either primary or secondary, that violates Union law must not be applied. The Union does not charge Austrian courts with checking statutes for compliance with the Austrian constitution, or administrative ordinances for compliance with Austrian law. The country's national constitution, on the other hand, does. It also provides for judicial review not just of ordinances (German: Verordnungen) but also of individual-scope decisions of the Austrian executive branch – written findings and assessments (Bescheide) as well as face-to-face personal orders and instances of the use of physical force (Maßnahmen).

In effect, the Austrian constitution concentrates the power of judicial review of primary and secondary legislation in a single specialist tribunal, the Constitutional Court. The approach is called the centralized system of judicial review. Because Austria was the first country ever to adopt centralized judicial review – with the 1920 Kelsen constitution – the approach is sometimes also called the Austrian system. Because centralized judicial review has since spread to Germany, Italy, Spain, Portugal, and Belgium, some people call it the European system.

Judicial review of individual-scope administrative actions is performed by a special system of administrative courts.

== Review of legislation ==
=== Ways of challenging legislation ===
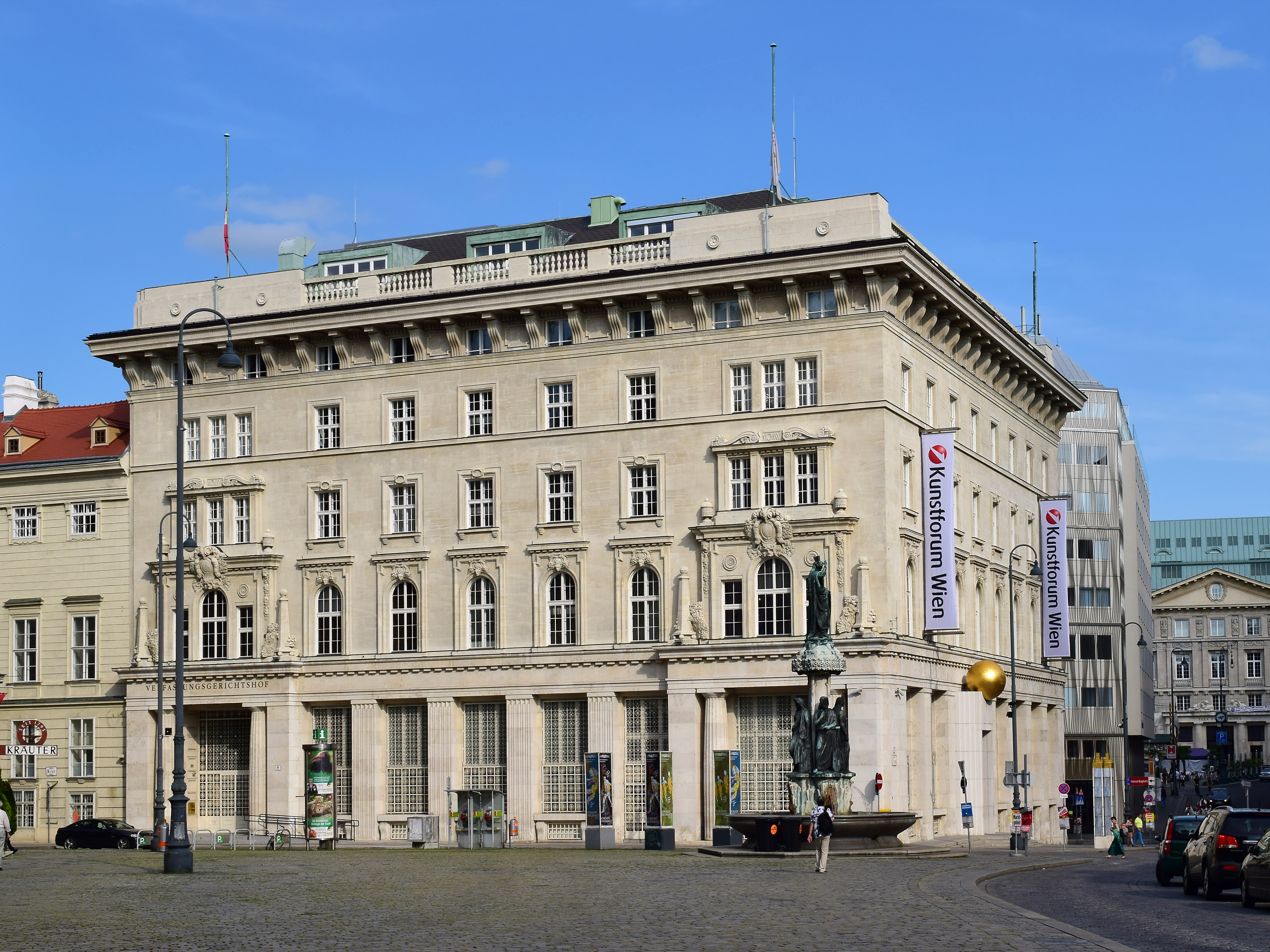
Constitutional Court

The general courts – civil and criminal chambers, essentially – are encouraged (and in fact required) to make sure that statutes they are about to apply have been enacted and promulgated in accordance with the constitution, and that ordinances they are about to apply have been issued in accordance with the constitution and with pertinent other legislation, primary or secondary. Statutes and ordinances that fail this test cannot be applied.

General courts are also authorized to consider whether a statute or ordinance at issue might be unconstitutional or illegal on other grounds. They can neither strike nor refuse to apply legislation they deem suspicious, however. Instead, they are encouraged (and required) to put the matter before the Constitutional Court. If a party to the trial believes that the court has applied a statute or an ordinance that is unconstitutional or illegal, that party can file a special appeal at law (Parteiantrag auf Normenkontrolle) against the verdict with the Constitutional Court.

In addition, the Constitutional Court can also be asked to intervene by legislative or administrative authorities:

- Review of a provincial ordinance can be requested by the national cabinet; review of a national ordinance by a provincial cabinet.
- Review of a provincial statute can be requested by the national cabinet; review of a national statute by a provincial cabinet, through a petition supported by one third of the members of the National Council, or through a petition supported by one third of the members of the Federal Council.

Finally, a private person, natural or other, can file a complaint (Individualantrag) against a statute or an ordinance with the Constitutional Court. The complaint has to argue that the complainant is being violated in their rights by the piece of legislation at issue, actually and not just potentially. The complaint also has to argue that there is no plausible way for the complainant to get the problem resolved through any other means available to them.

=== Purview of the Constitutional Court ===
The Constitutional Court is charged with making sure that all Austrian legislation, primary or secondary, conforms to any Austrian legislation outranking it. Statutes have to conform to the constitution. Executive ordinances also have to conform to ordinary law; supplementary ordinances also have to conform to the original ordinances they derive from. A road sign, for instance, needs to be legal under the Road Traffic Act but also in compliance with the Ministry of Commerce Regulation on Road Signs. Since the Austrian constitution defines Austria to be a federation, the provinces are federated states on paper and have token constitutions of their own; provincial law has to conform with these as well as with the national constitution. Since provinces do not run any courts of their own, reviewing provincial law for compatibility with provincial constitutions falls within the purview of the Constitutional Court as well.

The court does not check legislation for compliance with European Union law.

Unconstitutional laws and ordinances are not void ex tunc. The Court's decision rescinds them just like abrogation by the legislature would have done; decisions based on them that have been made in the past remain standing. The court has some latitude with respect to the date its decision becomes effective. Usually, laws and ordinances found to be unconstitutional go out of force the day after the publication of the verdict. To prevent disruption, however, the court can set a grace period during which a piece of unconstitutional legislation still remains on the rolls and may still be applied. The grace period may last up to six months for ordinances and up to eighteen months for laws. The court may allow eighteen months for ordinances that are de facto statutes because their disappearance will require a new statute to deal with. On the other hand, the court can also make its decision retroactive. The court's broad discretion forces the court to "legislate from the bench" whether it wants to or not: it does not simply announce a finding it notionally cannot avoid; it is officially choosing policy.

=== Treaties ===
Judicial review of legislation includes judicial review of international treaties. Since treaties are concluded by the president, they originate with the executive branch. This makes them equivalent to ordinances, meaning they cannot be incompatible with any statutes. Certain treaties can be elevated to statute rank by the National Council, however, meaning they only have to be constitutional.

Since Austria cannot unilaterally rescind an agreement it has entered into under international law, the court cannot actually void any treaty. It can, however, order Austrian officials to stop applying it. If this puts Austria in breach of treaty obligations, it is up to the administration to negotiate an amendment to the treaty or a withdrawal from it. As with legislation it strikes, the court can grant a grace period during which the provisions of the treaty can still be applied. The grace period may last up to two years for treaties that alter the constitution of the European Union and up to one year for most other treaties.

== Review of administrative actions ==
=== Administrative courts ===
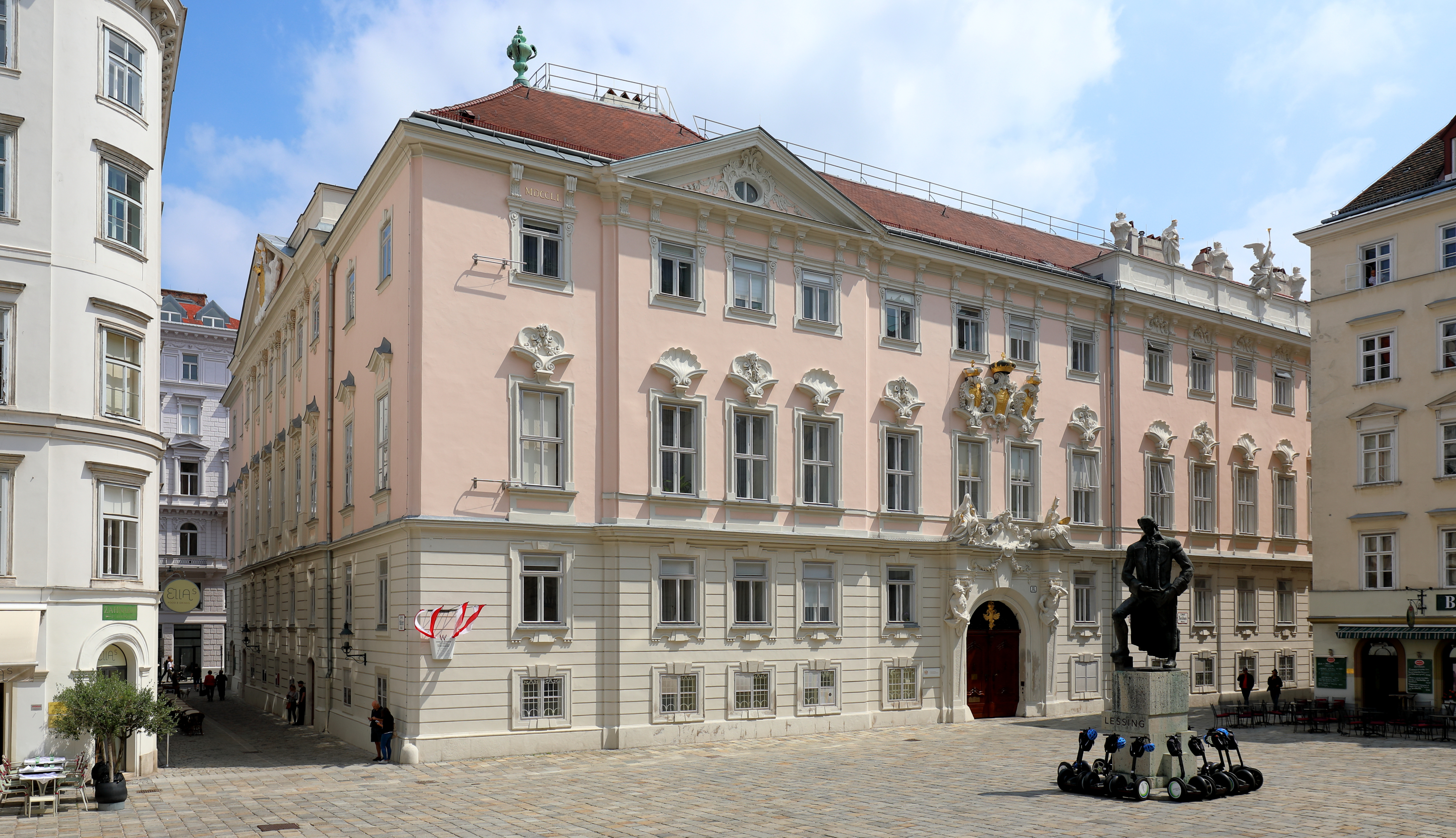
Supreme Administrative Court

Judicial review of actions of the executive branch other than secondary legislation is performed by a special system of administrative courts. These courts are where persons, natural or other, complain about written findings and assessments (Bescheide), about officials making use of their authority to issue face-to-face personal orders (Befehlsgewalt) and against officials using physical force or threats of physical force (Zwangsgewalt). The systems hears complaints not just about action but also about inaction; Austrians can take the administration to court if it refuses to make decisions it is required to make, misses deadlines, or generally neglects its responsibilities.

There are eleven administrative trial courts (Verwaltungsgerichte), two for each province and two for the national level. Verdicts of the administrative trial courts can be appealed to the Supreme Administrative Court (Verwaltungsgerichtshof).

=== Escalation to the Constitutional Court ===
Like general courts, administrative courts can (and should) invoke the assistance of the Constitutional Court if the constitutionality or legality of a statute or an ordinance appears dubious. As with general courts, a party to the trial can file an appeal at law against the verdict of the trial court with the Constitutional Court. With administrative courts, however, the complaint (Erkenntnisbeschwerde) does not have to argue that the court has applied an unconstitutional statute or an illegal ordinance, it can also argue that the verdict is violating the complainant's constitutional rights in some other way.

An appeal to the Constitutional Court either against a general court (Parteiantrag) or against an administrative court (Erkenntnisbeschwerde) is not a regular appeal at law (Revision); it is an extraordinary measure independent of the normal appeals process:

- The extraordinary appeal can only be filed against the verdict of the original trial court. The complainant cannot appeal verdicts of appellate courts to the Constitutional Court, including but not limited to decisions handed down by the Supreme Court of Justice and the Supreme Administrative Court.
- If the Constitutional Court upholds the legislation in question, the complainant still has their regular appeal to the regular appellate court, which may still overturn the original verdict for reasons the Constitutional Court is not charged with considering. It is even possible, and often useful, to file both the ordinary and the extraordinary appeal in parallel. In fact, complainants fighting a verdict of a general court are required to file both appeals at essentially the same time.

The relative complexity of this arrangement is due to historical reasons.

Starting with the reforms of Maria Theresa and Joseph II, Austrian constitutional thinking gradually developed the principle that general court system and administration should not interfere with each other. Judges should not be allowed to overturn administrative decisions just like bureaucrats should not be allowed to overturns verdicts. Citizens would not fight unfavorable administrative decisions in court, they would appeal them to higher levels of the administration, much like they appealed unfavorable judicial decisions to higher levels of the judiciary. By the 1840s, this principle was well established. In 1848, it became enshrined in the Pillersdorf Constitution.

Originally, keeping judges and bureaucrats at arm's length was a great step forward because the main practical consequence was judicial independence. By 1867, however, the downsides of the arrangement had also become obvious. The 1867 December Constitution established the Administrative Court (Verwaltungsgerichtshof), a tribunal that could overturn administrative decisions on behalf of complainants who had exhausted their administrative appeals. It also created the Imperial Court (Reichsgericht), a tribunal that would hear complaints about general violations of constitutional rights by the executive branch. The Republic of Austria renamed the Imperial Court to Constitutional Court but did not change the arrangement in any fundamental way. Austrians who felt violated in their constitutional rights by an administrative decision or assessment (Bescheid) could petition the Constitutional Court to overturn it. The complaint had to name a right specifically guaranteed by the constitution and had to assert that the administration had applied a law violating the constitution or an ordinance violating the law. The complainant still had to already have exhausted their appeals.

Not designed with the modern regulatory state in mind, both Administrative Court and Constitutional Court were under serious strain by the late 20th century. It was also increasingly seen as outdated and inadequate from a human rights perspective; European integration demanded an upgrade.

A reform in 2014 added created eleven new administrative trial courts (Verwaltungsgerichte), one for each of the nine provinces and two for the national level. The original Administrative Court was retained as the appeals court in which verdicts of the new trial courts could be fought. The intra-administrative appeals process was scrapped to prevent durations of proceedings from becoming excessive. The Constitutional Court no longer hears complaints about the administration directly. Instead, it now hears complaints regarding the constitutionality of verdicts of administrative trial courts. While unusual, the system allows the Constitutional Court to keep both the administration and the judiciary in line with the constitution, even though it technically hears neither complaints about the former nor appeals against verdicts of the latter. At the same time, it prevents the Constitutional Court from getting overburdened.

== Review of legislation in practice ==
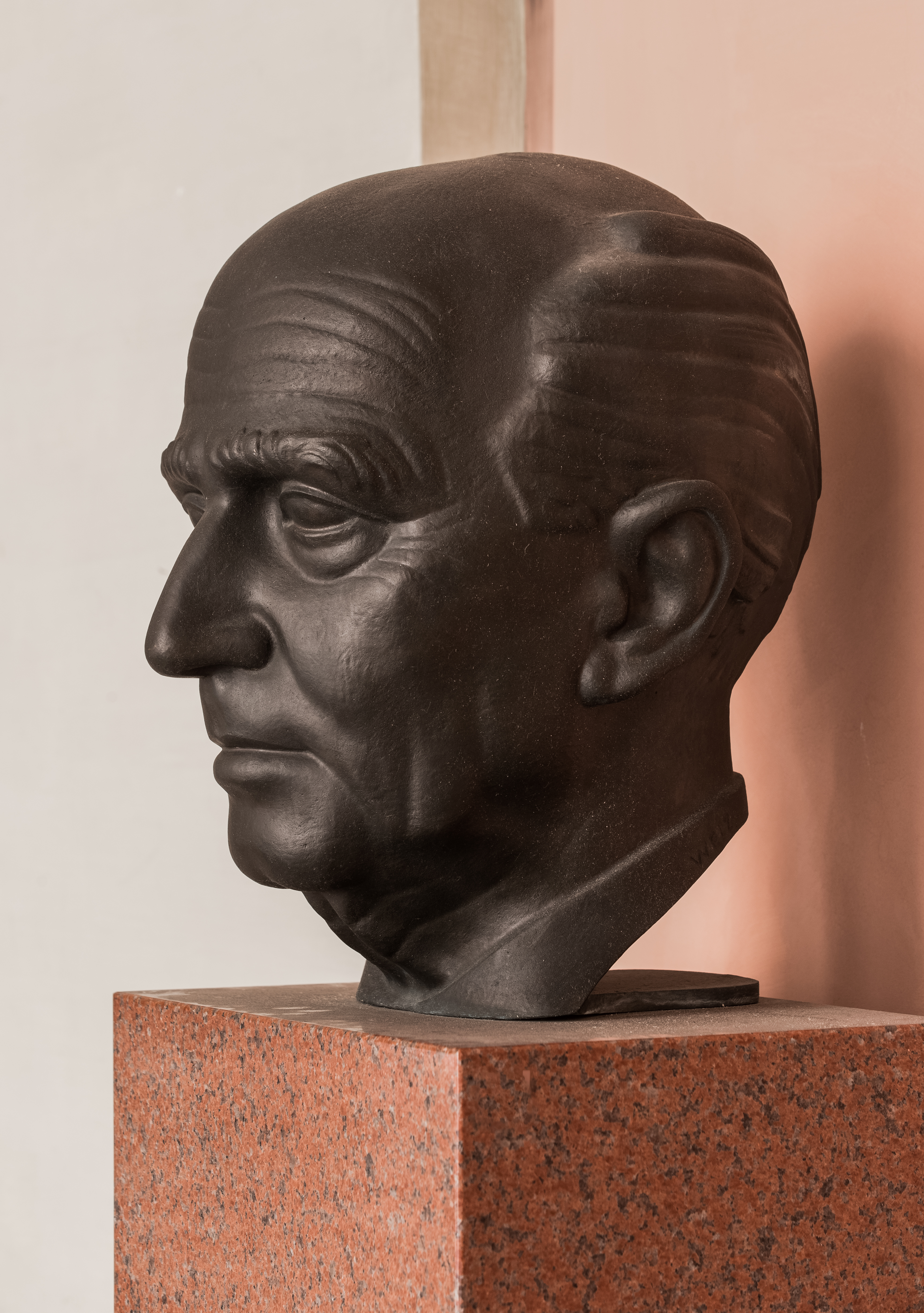
Austrian constitutional thought continues to be heavily influenced by the work of Hans Kelsen

The judicial review of legislation in Austria is marked by three apparent contradictions: a strong Constitutional Court in a country with a high degree of constitutional flexibility; a constitution that uses the language of federalism but stipulates strong centralization; a sprawling and fragmented constitution that practically forces jurists to legislate from the bench in a democracy that used to be consociationalist and remains strongly consensus-oriented to this day. All three incongruities have inspired significant volumes of legal scholarship over the years; they have also strongly influenced the court's actual decisions.

=== Flexibility ===
The Constitutional Court is powerful but Austria has what political scientists call a high degree of constitutional flexibility: the Austrian constitution is comparatively easy to amend. With a few qualifications that have proven mostly irrelevant in practice, a two-thirds supermajority in the National Council is enough. For much of the second half of the 20th century, Austria's Grand Coalition governments of Social Democrats and People's Party have commanded majorities well in excess of this requirement; in the late 1940s to early 1960s, the government controlled 92% of the seats on average. The backbone of the constitution, the Federal Constitutional Law, has been amended over a hundred times since 1945. As a result of this tension, political scientists rate Austrian judicial review as "medium strength" even though the Austrian-style centralized model generally tends to result in strong judicial review.

=== Fragmentation ===
One consequence of Austria's easy amendments is that the constitution has to be treated as layered (mehrschichtig): if the core of the constitution and the amendment of the week had been treated as equal in rank, there would effectively not have been any real constitution at all. In acknowledgement of this, the court has established that some parts of the constitution are more constitutional than others. This gives rise to the possibility that constitutional law can be unconstitutional.

Another consequence of the ease of amending it is that Austria's constitution has grown exceptionally large; it may in fact be the most extensive national constitution in the world. Austria has about 60 constitutional statutes (Verfassungsgesetze). In addition, there are about 100 ordinary statutes (Einfachgesetze) some of whose sections are individually marked as constitutional provisions (Verfassungsbestimmungen); these constitutional provisions number about 1000 total. Yet more constitutional provisions are contained in about 100 international treaties.

Additional complications arise from the fact that different parts of Austria's constitutional law were written by authors from fundamentally different schools of legislative thought; the corpus is therefore very uneven in style. This makes statutory interpretation technically challenging. Core parts of the corpus are unusually terse, practically guaranteeing that subtly different approaches will yield widely different results.

=== Federalist elements ===
The Federal Constitutional Law defines Austria to be a federation but distributes powers and responsibilities in a way that makes the country more or less unitary in reality. Cisleithania had been a unitary state with some limited devolution of responsibility to regional administrations; the modern Republic of Austria mostly retains this structure. The national level clearly dominates political life. Austria is commonly described as "centralized" or "highly centralized". The country has also been called "a federation without federalism" and "so centrally dominated in design as to be little short of unitary". The apportionment of areas of competence between national and regional levels is internationally unique, highly complex, and badly outdated. The framework is immune to reform because, for all its faults, it represents a stable compromise between political camps with radically different visions regarding the Austrian government's basic structure.

The Constitutional Court regularly has to create new rules to allow legislatures to handle pressing matters that a straightforward reading of the constitution would make impossible to legislate on: neither the national level nor the regional level could deal with the problem without disturbing the respectively other level's territory. These issues create a large amount of legal theory and academic literature; scholars are torn between two competing schools of thought on the subject.

=== Disposition ===
The Constitutional Court has historically shown considerable judicial restraint. To some degree, this was a choice, made out of a desire not to appropriate the power to legislate. To some degree, especially in the decades since 1945, it was also a result of the appointment process. Very early into the Second Republic, Social Democrats and People's Party reached an informal agreement regarding Constitutional Court nominations that prevented either camp from gaining a strong upper hand. Each party would effectively own a share of the seats. Retiring Social Democratic members would be replaced by other Social Democratic members; the People's Party would get to replace retiring People's Party justices. As a result, the court has tended to take non-interventionist positions on politically sensitive issues.

=== Interpretative approach ===
From its beginning in 1920 to its elimination by the Austrofascist putsch in 1934, the Constitutional Court has leaned strongly towards grammatical interpretation (strikte Wortlautinterpretation), although with occasional elements of the historical approach. Reasons include the court's general philosophy of restraint, the influence of Hans Kelsen, and a general local tradition of legal positivism. In the first few decades after the court's reestablishment in 1945, restraint continued to seem a wise policy, and grammatical reasoning continued to be the court's preferred approach. From the 1980s forward, the court has gradually shifted towards teleological reasoning, similar to the approach taken by the German Federal Constitutional Court and partly influenced by it. Today, both approaches are used side by side; this can make verdicts difficult to predict even in the absence of political contentiousness.
