= Eckart Ratz =

Austrian jurist

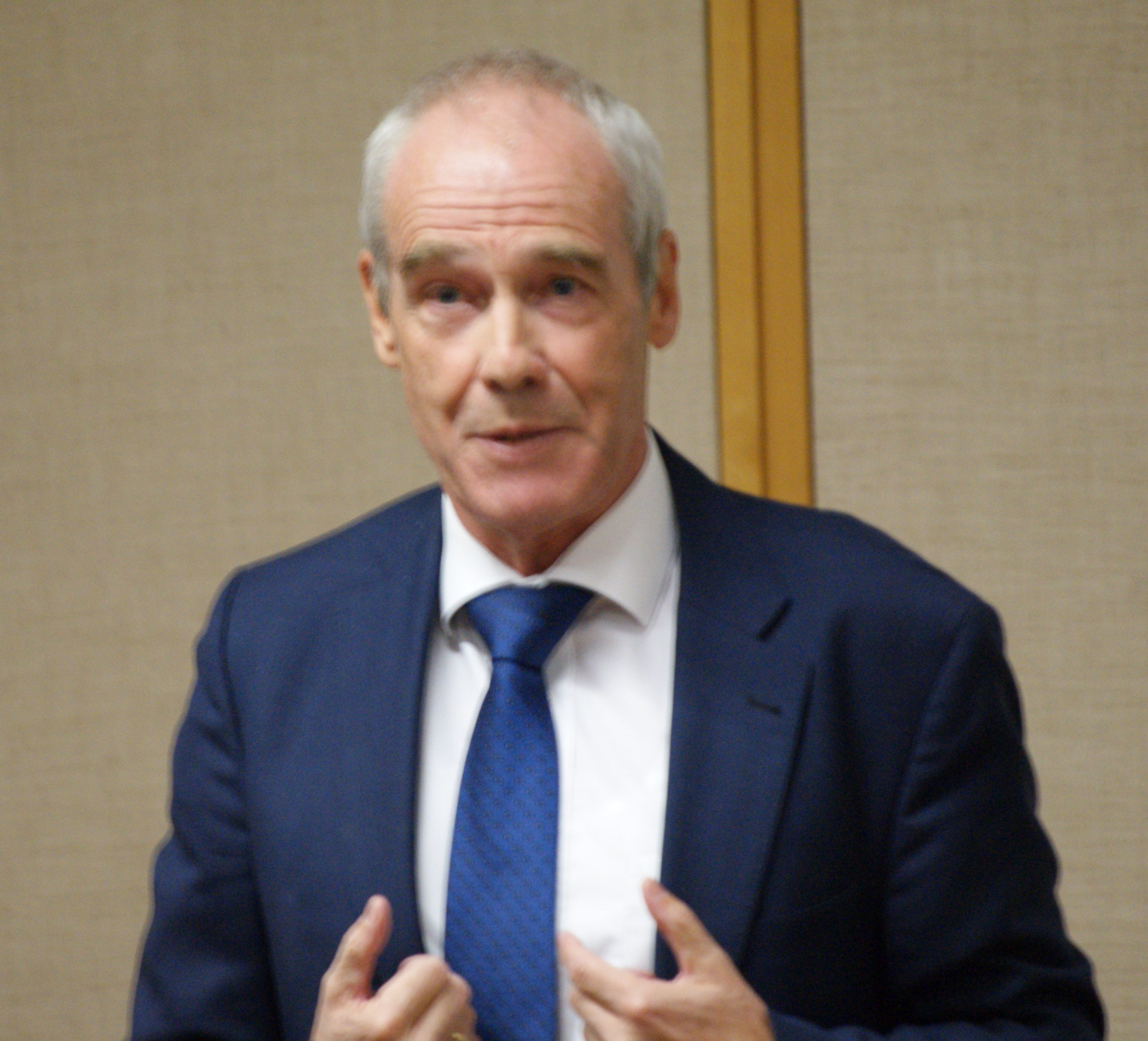

Minister of the Interior
- In office 22 May – 3 June 2019
- Chancellor: Sebastian Kurz
- Preceded by: Herbert Kickl
- Succeeded by: Wolfgang Peschorn

President of the Supreme Court of Justice
- In office 1 January 2012 – 1 July 2018
- Preceded by: Irmgard Griss
- Succeeded by: Elisabeth Lovrek

Vice President of the Supreme Court of Justice
- In office 9 March 2011 – 1 January 2012
- President: Irmgard Griss

Personal details
- Born: 28 June 1953 (age 71); Bregenz, Austria

Eckart Ratz (born 28 June 1953) is an Austrian jurist who served as a judge and the president of the Supreme Court of Justice. From 2011 to 2012 he was a vice president of the Supreme Court.
On 22 May 2019, he was appointed Austrian minister of the interior, replacing Herbert Kickl who had been dismissed from office by President Alexander Van der Bellen. Originally, Ratz was going to serve as a cabinet minister of the transitional government until the General Elections in fall 2019; however, the entire second Kurz government was ousted by a vote of no-confidence, after it lost support in parliament by the former coalition partner FPÖ.
