= Verwaltungsgerichtshof =

Verwaltungsgerichtshof may refer to:

- Supreme Administrative Court (Austria)
- a high administrative court in the Judiciary of Germany
