= Supreme Court of Justice (Austria) =

Supreme civil and criminal court of Austria

- Oberster Gerichtshof
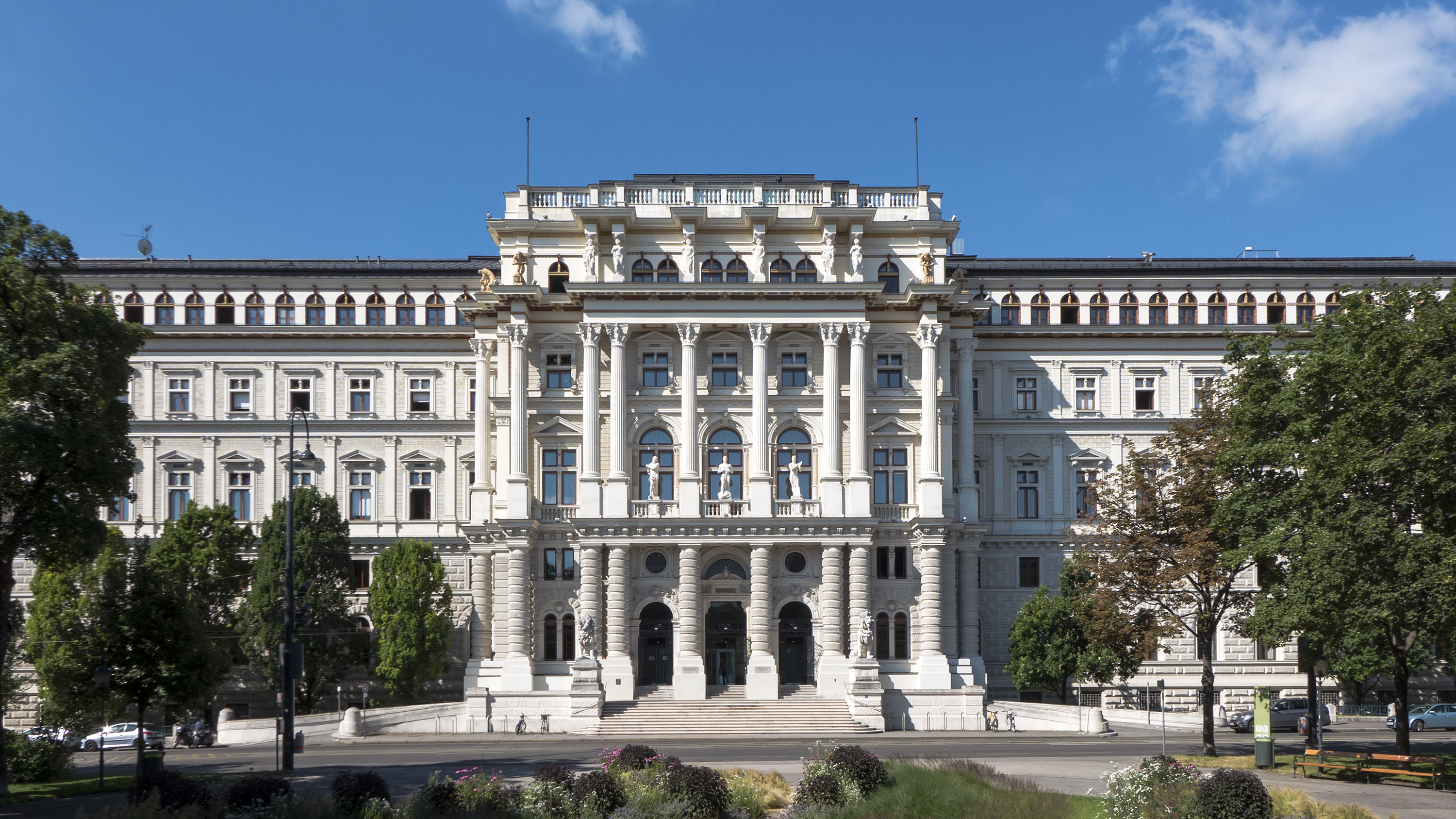
- Established: 1 May 1749 (as Supreme Judicial Office); 21 August 1848 (as Supreme Court of Cassation); 25 January 1919 (as Supreme Court of Justice)
- Location: Palace of Justice, Vienna
- Composition method: Appointed by the president on nomination of the minister of justice
- Number of positions: 61 (January 2024)
- Website: ogh.gv.at

President
- Currently: Georg Kodek
- Since: 1 January 2024

The Supreme Court of Justice (German: Oberster Gerichtshof or OGH) is the final court of appeal of Austria in civil and criminal matters. Along with the Supreme Administrative Court and the Constitutional Court, it is one of Austria's three apex courts.

The Court does not have a fixed number of members. As of the early 21st century, there are typically between fifty and sixty justices on the Court. The responsibility for appointing Supreme Court justices is vested in the president of Austria, but the president can and usually does delegate this task to the minister of justice. The minister picks from a shortlist of three nominees provided by the Court itself.

The Supreme Court of Justice convenes in the Palace of Justice in Vienna.

== Powers and responsibilities ==
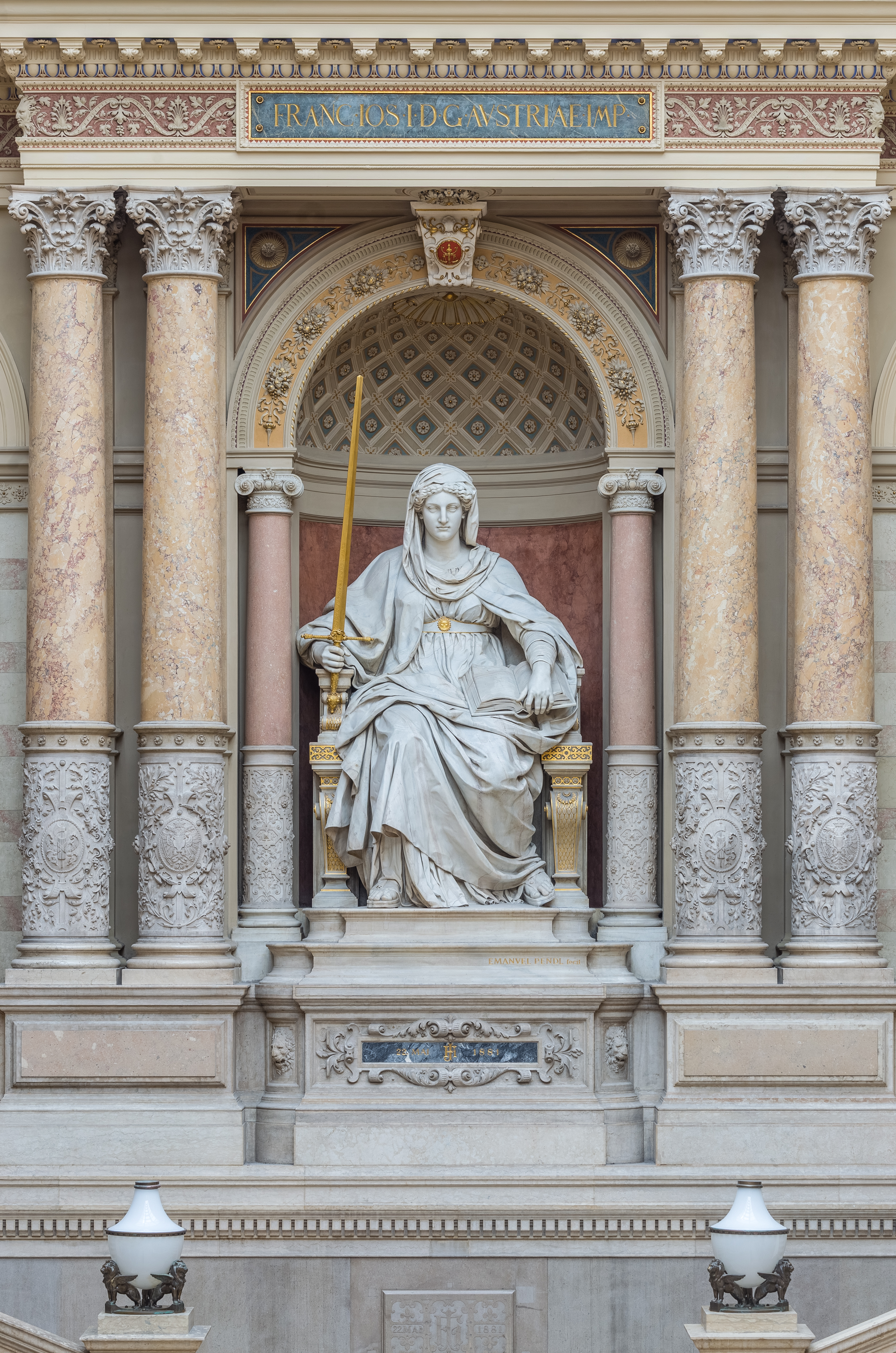
A statue of Iustitia in the Austrian Palace of Justice, the seat of the Supreme Court since 1881

=== Jurisdiction ===
The Supreme Court of Justice has ultimate appellate jurisdiction over all civil and criminal court cases in Austria and is the highest body within the general court system (ordentliche Gerichtsbarkeit).

Any party to a general court case can file an appeal on points of fact and law (Berufung). If the case is a civil case, the appellate court will examine whether the trial court has made any procedural errors: if yes, it orders a retrial, sending the case back to the trial court; if no, or if the case is criminal, the appellate court conducts what is essentially a retrial itself. An appellate trial does not merely review points of law but also points of fact, assessing evidence and questioning witnesses again.

While an appeal-at-law in civil matters (Revision) can be filed by any party, appeals-at-law in criminal matters (Nichtigkeitsbeschwerde) can only be filed by the Supreme Prosecutorial Service (Generalprokuratur), a unique specialised judicial body with the power to review the compliance of lower court verdicts with statutory and constitutional law; as its nature and purpose is different from all other prosecution services, the Supreme Prosecutorial Service cannot file criminal charges and does not have operational authority over lower prosecution services, though it may handle certain demarcation conflicts between them.

Civil cases include regular civil trials (Zivilprozess) as well as so-called "non-adversary proceedings" (Außerstreitverfahren), enforcement proceedings (Exekutionsverfahren) and insolvency proceedings (Insolvenzverfahren). Non-adversary proceedings in turn include matters related to property (Grundbuchssachen), incorporation (Firmenbuchssachen), guardianship (Obsorge), inheritance (Verlassenschaftsverfahren), child support (Unterhaltsverfahren), preliminary lawsuits (Mahnverfahren), adoption (Adoption), involuntary hospitalization (Unterbringung), declarations of death (Todeserklärung) and various other things; they are primarily adjudicated by judicial magistrates (Rechtspfleger).

It hears "appeals-at-law" against decisions of appellate courts. A successful appeal-at-law not only overturns but utterly erases the ruling of the appellate court, sending the case down the ladder again. Decisions of trial courts − although not of appellate courts − that result from a trial court's invocation of an unconstitutional statute or ordinance can be challenged in the Constitutional Court by filing an "extraordinary appeal-at-law".

=== Status within the judiciary ===
The Austrian judiciary is organized into general courts (ordentliche Gerichte) and courts of public law (Gerichte öffentlichen Rechts). The courts of public law are responsible for the executive and legislative branches of government. One of its limbs, the administrative court system, reviews the legality of administrative acts. Its other limb, the Constitutional Court, adjudicates on liability claims against Austria, its states and its municipalities, handles demarcation conflicts between courts of law, or between courts and members of the public administration; hears complaints regarding the constitutionality of statutes or the legality of ordinances, hears election complaints, and hears complaints regarding the conduct of sitting elected officials and political appointees. While the general courts deal with all civil and criminal cases.

Within the general court system, all trial court cases are adjudicated either by district courts (Bezirksgericht) or regional courts (Landesgericht); decisions of district courts can be appealed to the respective regional court, regional court verdicts can be appealed to a higher regional court (Oberlandesgericht). The four higher regional courts and the Supreme Court of Justice do not have original jurisdiction and are limited to hearing appeals. To guarantee a consistent, nationwide interpretation and application of the law, some verdicts may be appealed to the Supreme Court directly, especially verdicts citing past and potentially outdated Supreme Court decisions.

=== Disciplinary authority ===
In addition to that, the Court also deals with some intra-judicial disputes. It hears, as court of first instance, complaints lodged by judges against the public administration and disciplinary complaints against justices of the Supreme Court and higher regional courts and attorneys of the Supreme Prosecutorial Service and the higher regional prosecution services (Oberstaatsanwaltschaft). The first disciplinary committee of the Court deals with the Court's own justices and personnel. In contrast, the second disciplinary committee deals with the judges, attorneys and other personnel of the aforementioned inferior institutions.

It also has appellate jurisdiction in disciplinary proceedings against lower-ranking judges, prosecutors, attorneys, and notaries. Decisions handed down by the Court are final.

Although the Supreme Court has disciplinary authority (Disziplinargewalt) over lower-ranking judicial bodies, it does not have operational authority (Dienstaufsicht) over them. The Ministry of Justice has operational authority over the higher regional courts, the higher regional courts over the regional courts and the regional courts over the district courts; operational authority does not confer the right to meddle with judicial independence (richterliche Unabhängigkeit). The higher regional courts are also responsible for the general management (Geschäftsführung) of all courts within their circuit (Oberlandesgerichtssprengel).

=== Legislative role ===
In addition to its adjudicative functions, the Court is charged with publishing appraisals of draft legislation presented to the National Council by the Cabinet; the Court is required to evaluate a Cabinet bill if asked to do so by the president of the Court or the minister of justice. The Court does not have the authority to actually veto legislation, however, and neither does it have the soft power to make draft bills politically untenable. Austria is a parliamentary democracy in which most bills originate not from individual lawmakers but from the Cabinet; the country has had strong consociationalist tendencies historically and remains highly consensus-oriented to this day. Formal expert opinions on draft bills offered by political lobbying groups, professional associations, churches, regional governments, and various arms of the federal bureaucracy are a routine part of the legislative process; neither the Cabinet nor the legislature are required to defer to any of them.

=== Miscellany ===
The Court maintains the Central Library (Zentralbibliothek), Austria's official public law library.

== Composition ==
=== Membership ===
As of September 2023, the Supreme Court of Justice consists of a president, two vice presidents, thirteen presiding justices (Senatspräsident) and forty-four regular justices (Hofrat).

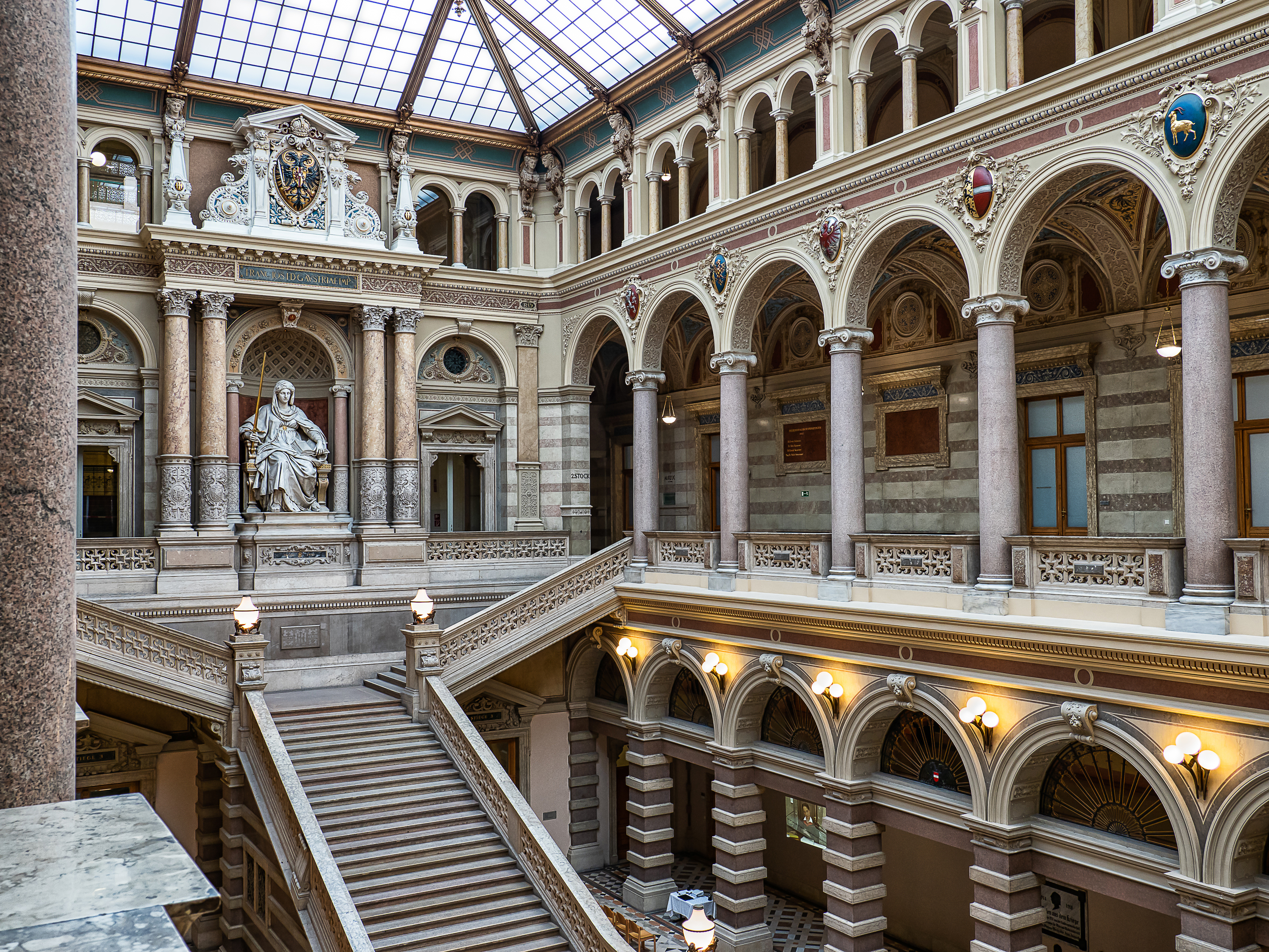
The four courtrooms for public hearings of the Supreme Court are all located on the right side of the second floor in the Palace of Justice.

Since the early 21st century, the Supreme Court typically has fifty to sixty members but Court and Cabinet may appoint as many justices as they deem necessary and appropriate. As with any other general court, Supreme Court justices are professional judges; they have graduated from law school, done four years of internship-type practical work (richterlicher Vorbereitungsdienst) in actual courthouses and passed a specialized final exam (Richteramtsprüfung). Supreme Court justices cannot be members of a cabinet or legislative body.

The responsibility for appointing justices is vested in the president of Austria, but the president can and usually does delegate this power to the minister of justice. The Court maintains a specialized personnel committee (Personalsenat) that provides the minister with a shortlist of three candidates in the event of a vacancy. In theory, the minister may appoint any Austrian legally qualified to sit on the bench (and not excluded by the constitution's rudimentary incompatibility provisions). In practice, the minister dependably picks one of the three candidates nominated by the Court.

=== Panels ===
For the purpose of actually trying cases, the Court is partitioned into 18 panels (Senate) of five members each. As everywhere in the Austrian court system, panels are subject to a fixed and specific apportionment of responsibilities (feste Geschäftseinteilung). The fixed apportionment is meant to prevent the Cabinet from influencing outcomes by hand-picking a panel sympathetic to its perspective. One panel exclusively deals with appeals decisions reached by arbitration tribunals; another panel hears appeals against antitrust verdicts handed down by the Vienna higher regional court, which has specialist exclusive jurisdiction over all Austrian antitrust cases. A third panel handles disciplinary proceedings and other disputes internal to the judiciary. Of the remaining fifteen panels, ten deal with regular civil cases and five with criminal trials.

Every panel is presided over by a chairperson. Though it is common for the president, the vice presidents and the presiding justices of the Court to chair a panel, it is not a legal necessity. For example, the 18th panel of the Court is chaired by a vice president and includes a presiding justice as ordinary member; conversely, the 11th panel was chaired by a presiding justice and included a vice president as ordinary member.

A new case that comes before the Court is first assigned to the relevant panel. One of the members of the panel is appointed case manager (Berichterstatter). The case manager directs the preliminary research. An office staffed with about 30 to 40 researchers and other assistants is attached to the Court to aid case managers in this task. Once the preliminary investigation is complete, the panel convenes, hears the official presentation of case and research by the case manager, deliberates, and votes. The case manager votes first, the presiding justice votes last; other members vote in order of decreasing seniority.

In cases that are trivial or routine, the panel is permitted to meet as a panel of just three (Dreiersenat). If a panel of five (einfacher Senat) suspects that a case currently before it may raise a question of law of wider importance (Rechtsfrage von grundsätzlicher Bedeutung) and that existing Supreme Court case law in the matter is ambiguous or inconsistent, the panel has to add an additional six members, for a total of eleven. A case that raises a question of law of wider importance also requires a panel of eleven (verstärkter Senat) if the verdict is going to overturn a large body of existing Supreme Court case law (ein Abgehen von der ständigen Rechtsprechung) or a verdict handed down by another panel of eleven.

The Court only rarely meets in plenum; a plenary session is mainly required to authorize the yearly activity report.

=== Presidency ===
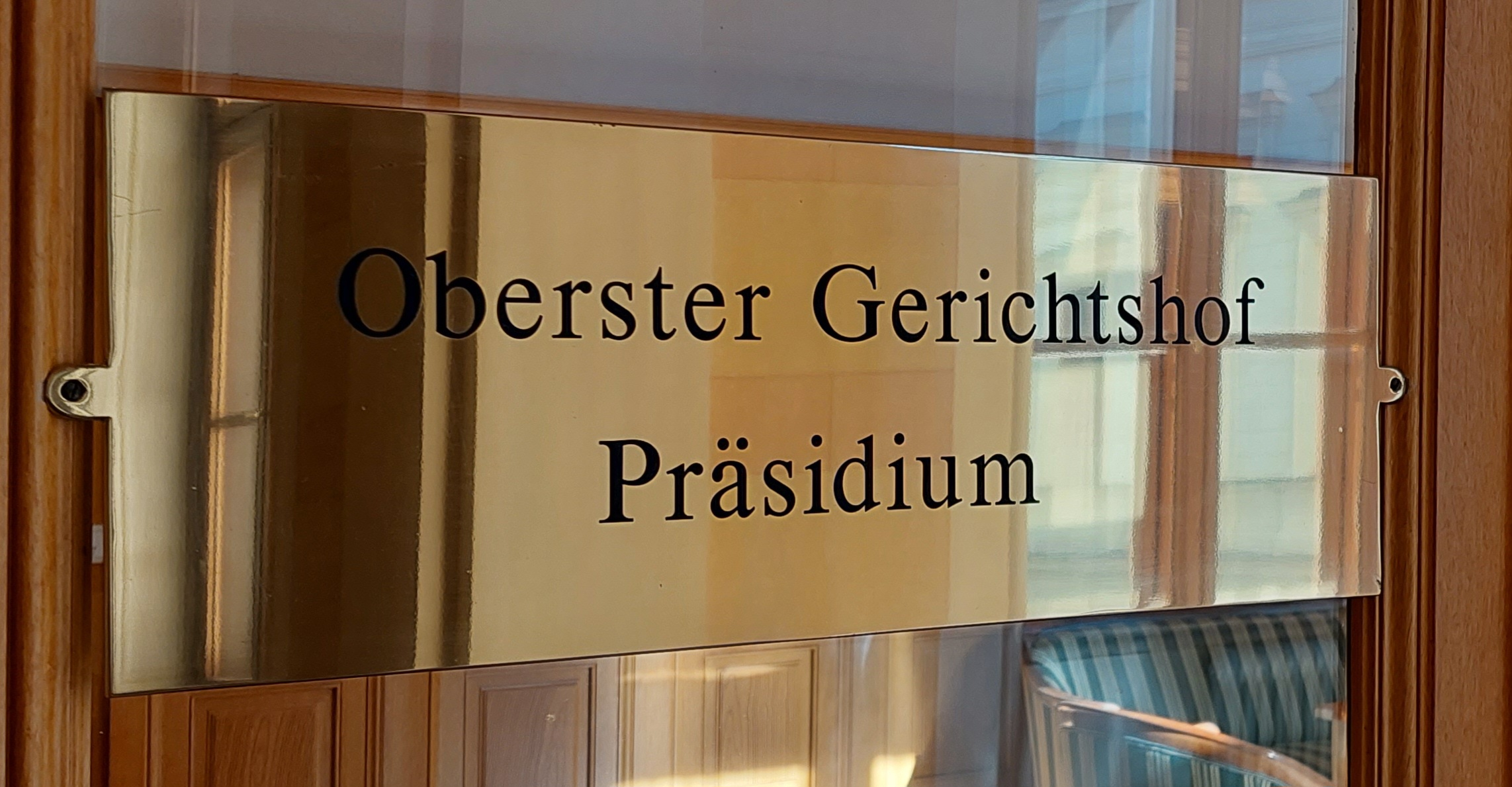
The Office of the President in the Palace of Justice

The president of the Supreme Court is the head and chief administrator of the Court. The president leads the judicial administration (Justizverwaltung), which also comprises the two vice presidents as well as the chief of staff (Präsidialrichter). The Judicial Administration includes affairs related to the personnel, the courthouse, the physical inventory, the budget, collaboration programs with universities, foreign countries, the press, the internal rules as well as the presidium, the secretariat, the bureau of evidence and the library and recruiting commissions. The president also presides over the personnel and second disciplinary committees. Like any other court president, the president of the Supreme Court has the power to indefinitely suspend any justice from duty; a suspension automatically triggers a disciplinary proceeding again that justice.

The following is a list of presidents:

==== Habsburg Monarchy ====
- 1848–1855: Ludwig Graf Taaffe
- 1857–1865: Karl Ritter von Krauss
- 1865–1891: Anton Ritter von Schmerling
- 1891–1899: Karl Ritter von Stremayr
- 1899–1904: Karl Habietinek
- 1904–1907: Emil Steinbach
- 1907–1918: Ignaz Freiherr von Ruber

==== First Republic ====
- 1919–1927: Julius Roller
- 1927–1938: Franz Dinghofer

==== Second Republic ====
- 1945–1953: Guido Strobele-Wangendorf
- 1954–1955: Franz Handler
- 1956–1957: Karl Wahle
- 1958–1965: Ludwig Viktor Heller
- 1966–1968: Hans Kapfer
- 1969–1971: Norbert Elsigan
- 1972–1979: Franz Pallin
- 1980: Wolfgang Lassmann
- 1981–1982: Rudolf Hartmann
- 1983–1986: Leopold Wurzinger
- 1987–1993: Walter Melnizky
- 1994–1998: Herbert Steininger
- 1999–2002 Erwin Felzmann
- 2003–2006: Johann Rzeszut
- 2007–2011: Irmgard Griss
- 2012-2018: Eckart Ratz
- 2018–2024: Elisabeth Lovrek
- 2024–present: Georg Kodek

== History ==
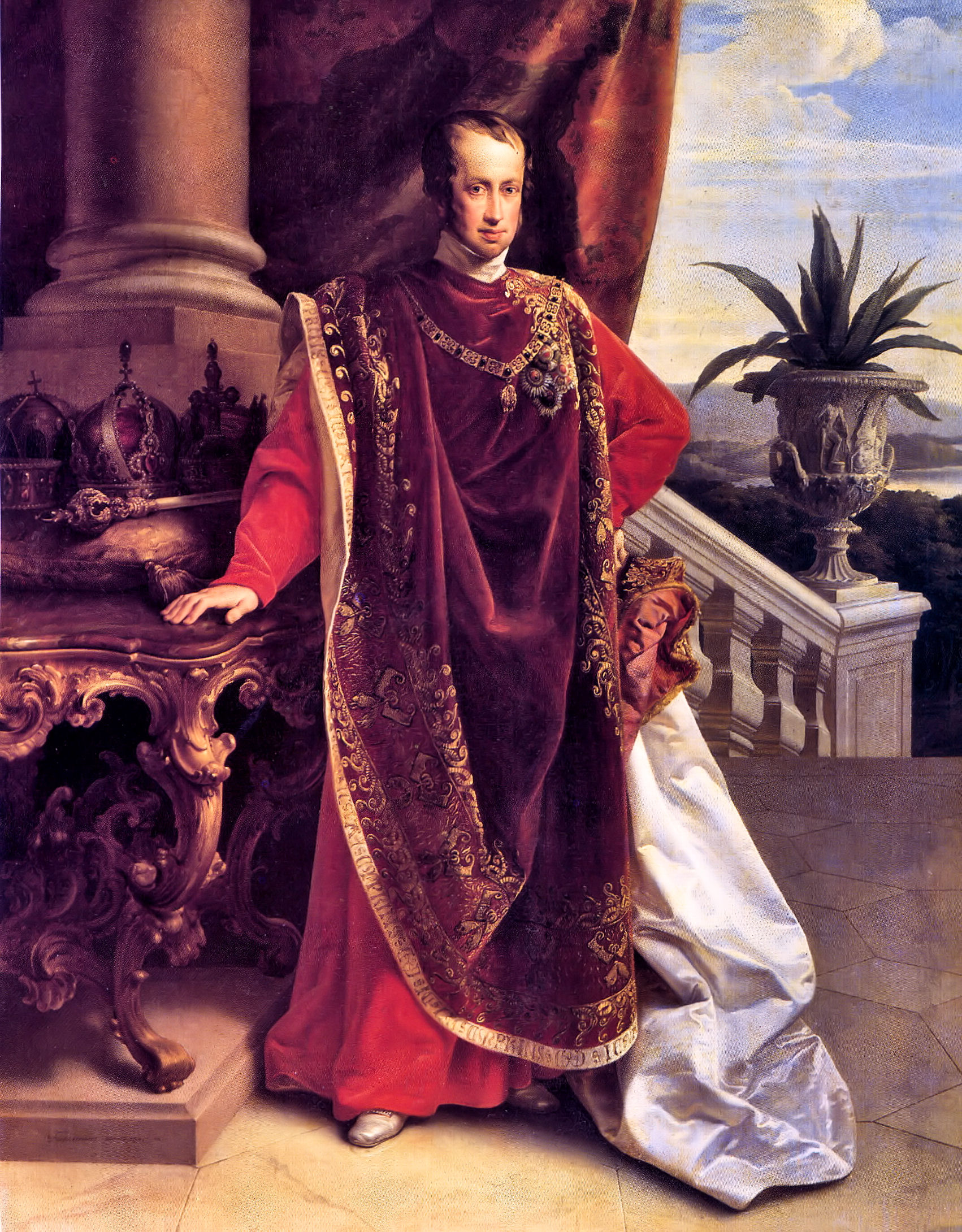
As an independent tribunal committed to the rule of law, the Supreme Court was first established during the reign of Ferdinand I.

=== Absolute monarchy ===
Between shortly after 1300 and shortly before 1800, the Habsburgs had gradually transformed their empire from a personal union of numerous independent realms and territories into a highly centralized unitary state. Feudal structures had been replaced with rules-based bureaucracies, hereditary local potentates with professional civil servants. The consolidation and modernization of jurisprudence, on the other hand, had been allowed to lag. Civil and criminal procedure as well as the criminal code proper had made great strides forward during the reigns of Maria Theresa and Joseph II in the late 18th century, a period of rapid and profound reform. In the early 19th century, Emperor Francis II had revolutionized the civil code. In terms of its organizational structure, however, the Court system was still essentially medieval.

Original jurisdiction over most civil and criminal matters resided with local princes (Landesfürsten) in some regions, with the estates of the realm (Landstände) in others, with petty landlords in parts of the countryside, and with proto-democratic municipal governments in certain cities. Clergy, aristocracy, transients, or members of guilds could be subject to claims of jurisdiction based not on locale or subject matter but purely on social class. There was no systematic separation of powers between judiciary and administration. The State as such mostly only exercised a limited amount of appellate jurisdiction. The Supreme Judicial Office (Oberste Justizstelle) in Vienna, created by Maria Theresa in 1749, functioned both as a token court of last appeal and as a rudimentary ministry of justice.

=== Constitutional monarchy ===
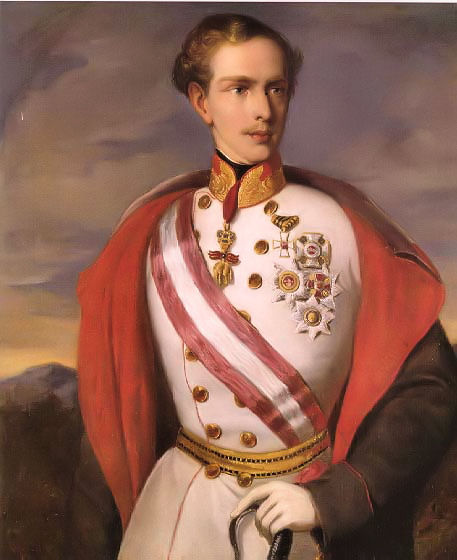
Although he originally resisted judicial independence and the separation of powers, Franz Joseph I ended up presiding over the development of Austria's modern system of general courts.

The Revolutions of 1848, whose goals included constitutional rule, equality before the law, and the abolition of outdated remnants of the feudal system, finally forced the Habsburgs to take drastic action. The first milestone was the Pillersdorf Constitution enacted by Emperor Ferdinand in April 1848. The constitution promised increased civil liberties, provided for a limited form of democratic participation in government, and stipulated that from now on all jurisprudence would be within the purview of the emperor, implicitly promising and end to Austria's jumbled mess of landlord, estate, and ecclesiastical courts. Another milestone was an edict issued on August 21 abolishing the Supreme Judicial Office and creating the Supreme Court of Cassation (Oberster Gerichts- und Kassationshof).

When Ferdinand's concessions failed to appease the revolutionaries and Ferdinand was forced to abdicate, his successor, Emperor Franz Joseph, promulgated the March Constitution, elaborating on a number of the provisions of the Pillersdorf Constitution. In particular, the March Constitution confirmed that the judicial powers and responsibilities of landlords, cities, and ecclesiastical corporations were abolished. All disputes were to be settled by the State, in courts explicitly created by statutory law and according to procedure explicitly set forth in statutory law. The new constitution also expressly established judicial independence and the separation of powers of judiciary and executive.

Subsequent legislation pursuant to the March Constitution created a system of general courts that also survived, with a few significant but narrow alterations, to this day. Most notably, the Constitution of the Courts (Gerichtsverfassungsgesetz or GVG) of June 1849 and the Penal Procedure Code (Strafprozessordnung or StPO) of January 1850 implemented an empire-wide hierarchy of trial and appellate courts that is virtually identical to the contemporary system.

A statute enacted in August 1850 established the panel system and otherwise detailed Supreme Court organization and procedure.

Effective 1852, Franz Joseph rescinded the March Constitution, attempting to reestablish himself as an absolute monarch. A complete rewrite of the Penal Procedure Code in 1853 eliminated judicial independence and, partially, the separation of powers. The hierarchy of trial and appellate courts in general and the Supreme Court of Cassation at its top in particular, however, survived. The Court then also survived the gradual return to constitutional rule between 1860 and 1868, although it lost jurisdiction over the eastern half of the empire when the Lands of the Crown of Saint Stephen gained legal independence ensuing the Austro-Hungarian Compromise of 1867.

=== First Republic ===
The collapse of the empire at the end of World War I and the Austrian rump state's subsequent transition from monarchy to democratic republic necessitated a number of changes to Austria's system of courts of public law. The system of general courts, on the other hand, remained largely unaffected, except of course for its drastic decrease in geographic reach. A pair of laws enacted by the emerging republic's provisional government in late 1918 and early 1919 confirmed the Supreme Court in its existence. The only thing the transition really changed was the name: the Supreme Court of Cassation (Oberster Gerichts- und Kassationshof) became the Supreme Court of Justice (Oberster Gerichtshof). Both the Kelsen Constitution of 1920 and the Austrofascist Federal State of 1934 retained the Court unaltered.

=== Nazi regime ===
The absorption of Austria into the German Reich in March 1938 made the Supreme Court superfluous and, in fact, inconvenient; for one thing, the German judiciary used the same four-tier hierarchy as its Austrian counterpart. The judicial districts served by German and Austrian local, regional, and higher regional courts, respectively, were roughly comparable in size. Decisions of Germany's 28 higher regional courts were appealed to the Reichsgericht in Leipzig; there was no strong reason for an extra appeals court intermediating between the Reichsgericht and the paltry 3 higher regional courts of the Reich's new territorial addition, the State of Austria (Land Österreich). For another thing, the Nazis were already planning to dissolve the State of Austria into a number of unlinked provinces (Reichsgaue) in the near future; any institution that expressly and specifically served the territory traditionally known as Austria would eventually have to be disbanded in any case. The Court ceased operations in March 1939.

When Austria regained independence in 1945, the Supreme Court was restored. Since then, its role and institutional structure have remained largely unchanged.
