= Emil Steinbach =

Austrian politician

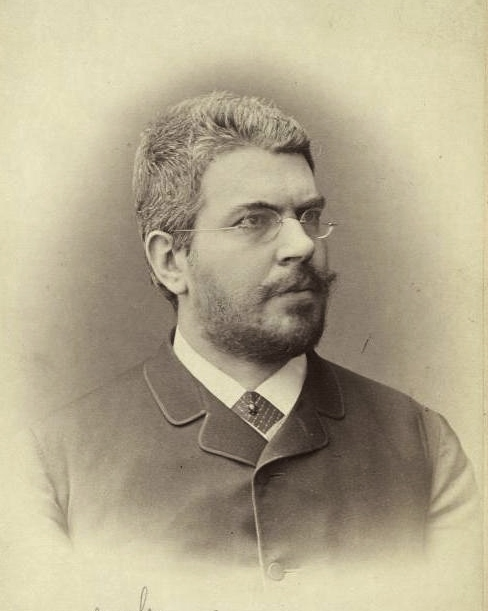

Minister of Finance of Austria
- In office 1891–1893
- Chancellor: Eduard Taaffe

President of the Supreme Court of Justice of Austria
- In office 1904–1907

Personal details
- Born: 11 June 1846; Vienna, Austrian Empire
- Died: 26 May 1907; Purkersdorf, Lower Austria, Austria-Hungary
- Occupation: Politician

Emil Robert Wilhelm Steinbach (11 June 1846 – 26 May 1907) was an Austrian politician.

In collaboration with Minister-President Eduard Taaffe he managed as Minister of Finance 1891–1893 some important reforms in imperial Austria like the extension of the right to vote, the implementation of a currency reform 1892 and the reorganisation of the system of income tax. In 1904–1907 he was President of the Austrian Supreme Court of Justice.

== Biography ==
=== Early life and education ===
Emil was born in Mariahilf, Vienna, the first of three children of the independent goldsmith Wilhelm Steinbach (d. 1877) and his wife Emilie (d. 1881), née Ofner. His father was originally from Arad (then part of the Kingdom of Hungary) and had converted from Judaism to Roman Catholicism at the time of his marriage. The family lived in modest circumstances. Emil’s brother Wilhelm died at the age of 18 from kidney colic.

As a secondary school student, Emil tried to support his family by giving private lessons. In 1862, the highly dedicated pupil transferred as an external student to the Academic Gymnasium in Vienna and graduated the following year, at the age of 17, with an excellent diploma.

Steinbach went on to study jurisprudence at the University of Vienna, where, as in school, his almost photographic memory made a strong impression on both classmates and professors. He earned his doctorate in law (Dr. jur.) in 1868. By 1874, he had completed his legal training as a law clerk, passed the bar examination, and was appointed lecturer, later professor, of law and economics at the Commercial Academy of the Vienna School of Commerce. A devout Catholic, Steinbach never married and devoted himself almost entirely to work. After the death of his parents, he joined the household of his younger brother Robert.

== Sources ==
- Fritz, Wolfgang: Finanzminister Emil Steinbach. Der Sohn des Goldarbeiters. Lit, Vienna, 2007, ISBN 978-3-7000-0711-1. (German)
