= Judiciary of Austria =

Overview of court system in Austria

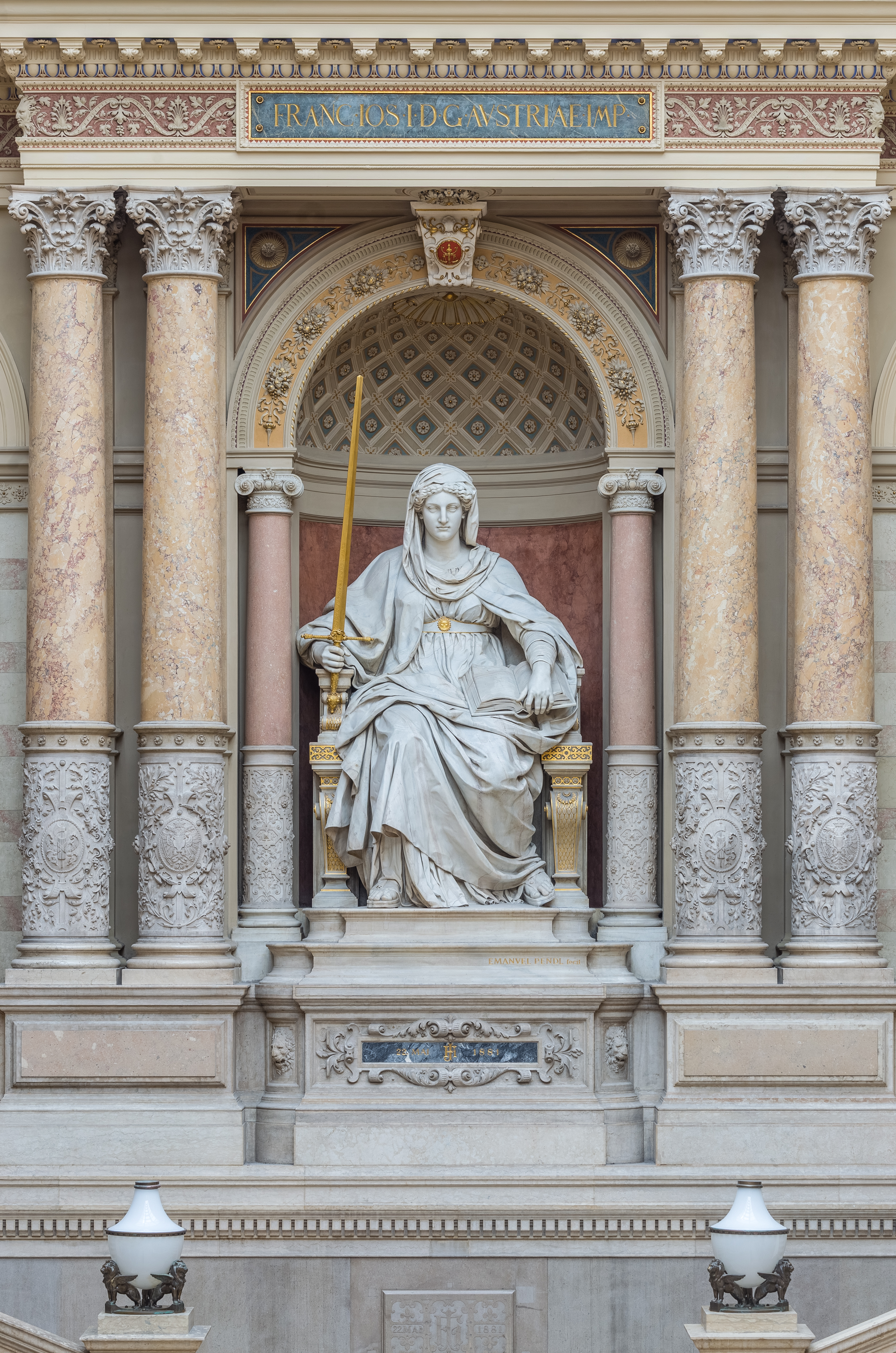
A statue of Iustitia in the Austrian Palace of Justice, the seat of one of the country's top courts

The judiciary of Austria (German: österreischische Judikative) is the system of courts, prosecution and correction of the Republic of Austria as well as the branch of government responsible for upholding the rule of law and administering justice. The judiciary is independent of the other two branches of government and is committed to guaranteeing fair trials and equality before the law. It has broad and effective powers of judicial review.

Structurally, the Austrian judiciary is divided into general courts (ordentliche Gerichte) and courts of public law (Gerichte öffentlichen Rechts). The general courts handle civil and criminal trials as well as non-adversary proceedings such as inheritance cases or legal guardianship matters. The courts of public law supervise the other two branches of government: the administrative court system reviews the legality of administrative acts; the Constitutional Court adjudicates on complaints regarding the constitutionality of statutes, the legality of ordinances, and the conduct of elected officials and political appointees in office.

In addition to the court system proper, the judicial arm of Austrian state power includes the state prosecution service (Staatsanwaltschaft), the prisons (Justizanstalten) and the correctional officers' corps (Justizwache). Remand prisons for pre-trial detention or other types of non-correctional custody (Polizeianhaltezentren) belong to the executive branch. The judiciary is assisted by the Ministry of Justice (Justizministerium), a cabinet-level division of the national executive.

== Organization ==
The administration of justice in Austria is the sole responsibility of the federal government. Judges and prosecutors are recruited, trained, and employed by the Republic; courts hand down verdicts in the name of the Republic (im Namen der Republik). There is no such thing, for example, as an Austrian county court.

The court system has two branches:

- general courts (ordentliche Gerichte) try criminal cases and (most) civil cases; (Note: Some authors, mostly Austrians, translate "ordentliche Gerichte" as "ordinary courts". Among authors who speak English as a first language, "general courts" predominates.)
- courts of public law (Gerichte öffentlichten Rechts) try (some of the) civil cases in which the respondent is a government authority: (Note: Sometimes translated as "public courts"; see above.)
  - the Constitutional Court (Verfassungsgerichtshof) exercises judicial review of legislation and constitutional review of administrative actions;
  - a system of administrative courts (Verwaltungsgerichte) exercises judicial review of administrative actions.

Judges are independent. Appointments are for life; judges cannot be removed or reassigned without their consent. In courts with more than one judge − which is essentially all of them − there has to be a fixed and specific apportionment of responsibilities (feste Geschäftseinteilung) to prevent the government from influencing outcomes by hand-picking a judge sympathetic to its perspective. For example, if a litigant files for divorce in a court with multiple judges handling divorce cases, the first letter of their last name decides which judge they are assigned.

Judges presiding over trials are professionals. In order to become eligible for appointment to a bench, a prospective judge needs to have a master's degree or equivalent in Austrian law, undergo four years of post-graduate training, and pass an exam. The training includes theoretical instruction and internship-type practical work in an actual courthouse. Appointments to benches are made by the president, although the president can and does delegate most of this responsibility to the minister of justice. Nominations come from within the judiciary; panels of judges suggest candidates for benches with vacancies.

There is no military justice in peacetime; members of the military are tried by the regular court system.

== Procedure ==
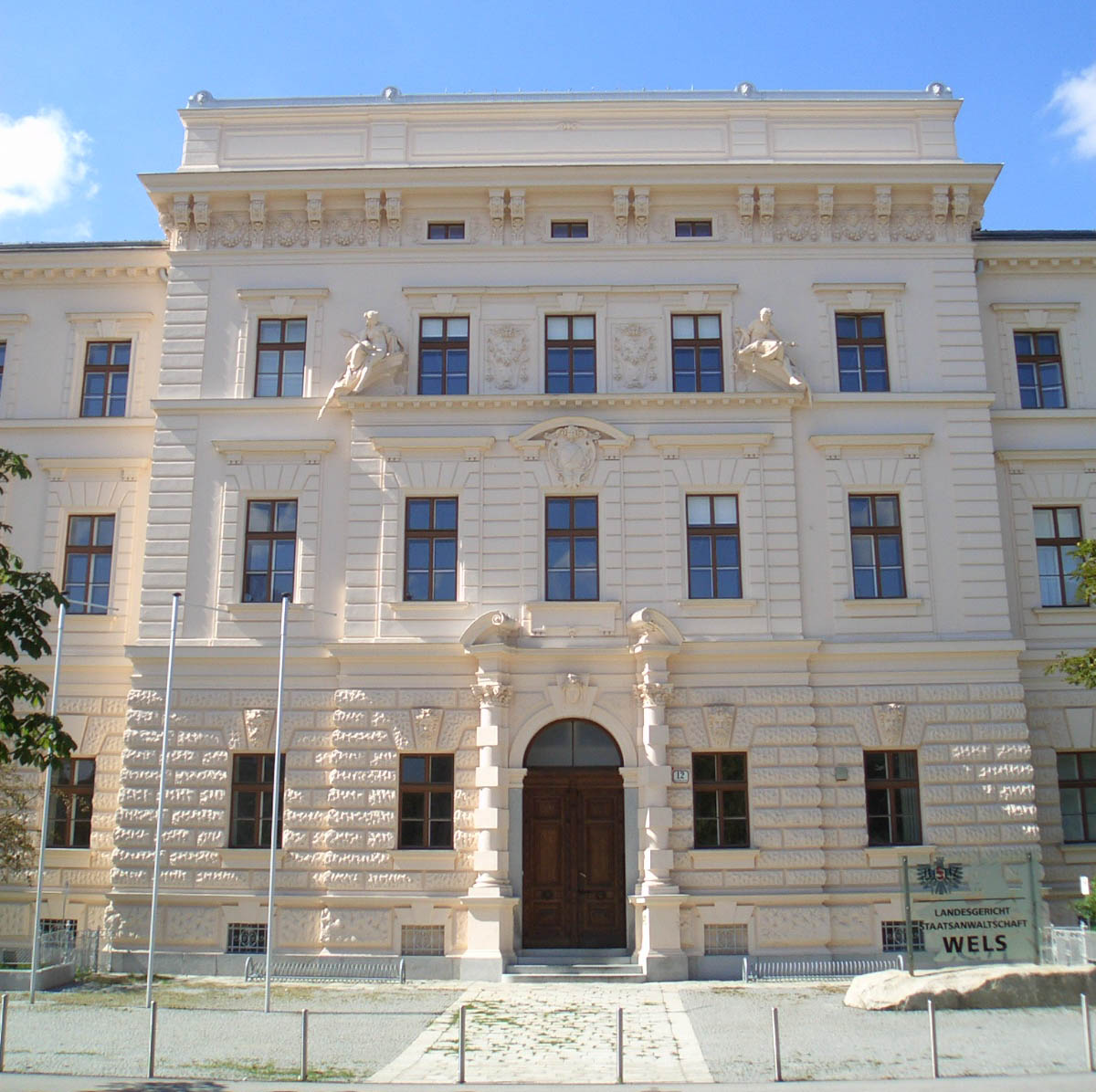
The seat of the Wels regional court

Trials are oral and public.

Civil trials are adversarial trials (streitige Verfahren). The court evaluates evidence brought before it by the parties to the trial but makes no attempt to uncover any additional evidence or otherwise investigate the matter itself. Criminal trials are inquisitorial trials (Anklageverfahren). (Note: In German, inquisitorisches Verfahren is only used to denote inquisitorial trials in which judge and prosecutor are the same person, or the same panel. An inquisitorial trial in which judge and prosecution are separate entities is called an Anklageverfahren, literally "prosecutorial trial". There has been no inquisitorisches Verfahren in Austria since the 1870s.) The court is actively involved, questioning witnesses brought forward by the parties to the trials, summoning expert witnesses on its own initiative, and generally attempting to determine the truth. Most trials are bench trials, although the bench will often be a panel including one or more lay judges (Schöffen). Criminal defendants accused of political transgressions or of serious crimes with severe penalties have a right to trial by jury.

Pursuant to the European Convention on Human Rights, which has been adopted into the Austrian constitution, but also to Austrian constitutional law preceding it, criminal defendants are protected by the set of procedural guarantees typical for modern liberal democracies. Among other things, defendants

- are presumed innocent until proven guilty;
- have the right to a speedy trial;
- cannot be tried in absentia;
- cannot be forced to incriminate themselves;
- cannot be tried for transgressions that are not specifically defined to be criminal offenses by statutory law, or that were not specifically defined to be criminal offenses by statutory law at the time they were committed ("nulla poena sine lege");
- cannot be prosecuted twice for the same crime, alleged or actual ("non bis in idem");
- have a right to an appeal.

The right to an appeal is taken seriously. Any party to any trial before a general court can file an appeal on facts and law (Berufung). If the case is a civil case, the appellate court first checks whether the trial court has committed procedural errors; if yes, it orders a retrial, sending the case back to the trial court. If no, or if the case is criminal, the appellate court conducts what is essentially a retrial itself − the appellate trial does not merely review questions of law but also questions of fact, assessing evidence and questioning witnesses.

In addition to the appeal on facts and law against the verdict of the trial court, an appeal at law (Revision in civil trials, Nichtigkeitsbeschwerde in criminal cases) can be filed against the verdict of the appellate court. In criminal cases, appeals at law that are not obviously frivolous are also handled in public hearings. A successful appeal at law not just overturns but completely erases the verdict of the appellate court, sending the case down the ladder again. Verdicts of trial courts − although not of appellate courts − that result from the trial court's application of an unconstitutional statute or an illegal ordinance can additionally be fought with extraordinary appeals at law to the Constitutional Court.

== General courts ==
The hierarchy of general courts has four levels: district, regional, higher regional, and supreme.

For most cases, original jurisdiction lies with one of the district courts; its decision can be appealed to the relevant regional court. Some cases are first tried before the regional court and can be appealed to the higher regional court. Except for special types proceedings (e.g. certain antitrust matters), higher regional courts and the Supreme Court do not have original jurisdiction; they exclusively hear appeals.

One of the peculiarities of the Austrian judiciary is its strict organizational separation of civil and criminal justice. Courts are divided into civil and criminal chambers; judges spend their days trying either civil cases or criminal cases but never both. In Vienna and in Graz − the country's two largest cities by a wide margin − the two chambers of the regional court are actually two completely separate courts, housed in separate buildings. In Vienna, there is a third regional court for trials at mercantile law (Handelsgericht) and a fourth regional court for cases involving employment and social assistance law (Arbeits- und Sozialgericht). Normally, original jurisdiction over disputes in these areas of law would lie with the civil regional court. As an additional special case, the higher regional court in Vienna has original jurisdiction over antitrust cases.

=== District courts ===
There are currently 113 district courts (Bezirksgerichte). Most judicial districts are coextensive with one of the country's 94 administrative districts, although there are exceptions. Some of the larger administrative districts are partitioned into two or more judicial districts. The extreme case is the City of Vienna, home to no fewer than 12 separate district courts. In some cases, a district court serving a city also serves part of the surrounding suburbs. In others, two or three very small administrative districts are lumped together into a single judicial zone.

District courts are responsible for

- civil trials (Zivilverfahren) involving matrimonial and family matters, real estate rental or lease matters, real estate boundary or easement disputes, or trespass to land;
- most simple debt collection, foreclosure, and bankruptcy matters;
- other civil trials with the amount in dispute not exceeding €15,000, excepting employment and social assistance disputes;
- most criminal trials (Strafverfahren) involving finable offenses or jailable offenses with a jail term of no more than one year;
- most non-adversary matters (Außerstreitsachen), for example probate proceedings, adoptions, declarations of death in absentia, or invalidation of lost securities certificates;
- most adversary non-trial matters (streitige Außerstreitsachen), including but not limited to child custody disputes, child maintenance and visitation rights disputes, appointments of legal guardians for senile elders or the mentally ill, or expropriation proceedings;
- maintaining the land register.

Trials before the district court are bench trials decided by a single judge (Bezirksrichter). Non-adversary proceedings, debt collection, foreclosure, bankruptcy, and land register matters can also be decided by a judiciary clerk (Rechtspfleger).

While there are permanent district judges, there are no district attorneys. Criminal trials are prosecuted by a state attorney (Staatsanwalt) attached to the relevant regional court. In minor cases, the public prosecutor can assign a district prosecutor (Bezirksanwalt) to substitute for them. The district prosecutor is not necessarily an attorney, however, and cannot act on their own initiative or authority.

=== Regional courts ===
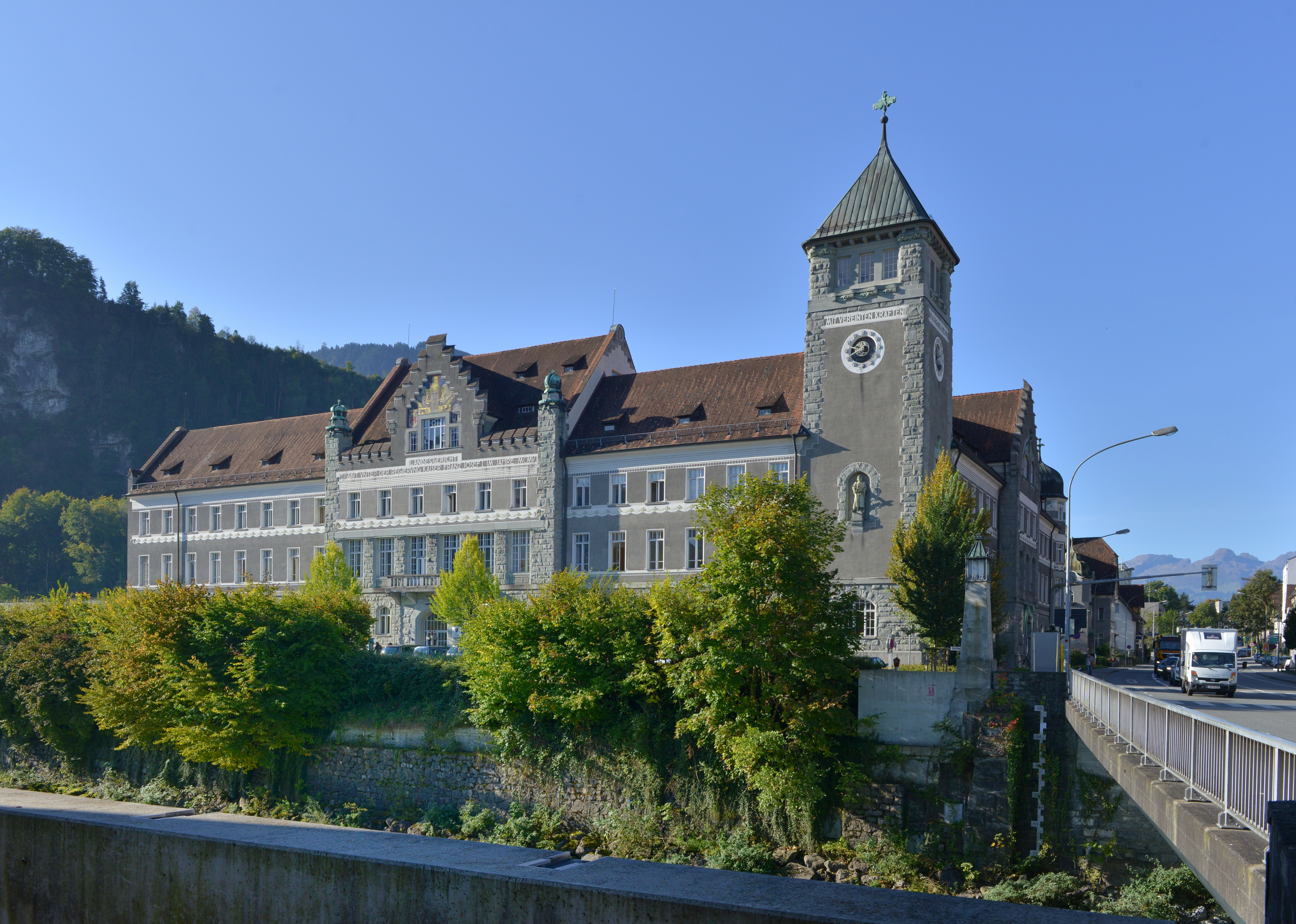
The seat of the Feldkirch regional court

There are 18 regional courts (Landesgerichte) in Austria; their seats are in Eisenstadt, Feldkirch, Graz, Innsbruck, Klagenfurt, Korneuburg, Krems an der Donau, Leoben, Linz, Ried im Innkreis, Salzburg, Sankt Pölten, Steyr, Vienna, Wels, and Wiener Neustadt. In Graz and Vienna, the civil and criminal chambers set up as two separate courts, meaning that Graz and Vienna each have a civil regional court (Landesgericht für Zivilrechtssachen) and a criminal regional court (Landesgericht für Strafrechtssachen).

Regional courts are responsible for

- exercising original jurisdiction over all civil and criminal matters not handled by district courts;
- hearing appeals on facts and law (Berufungen) against district court decisions;
- keeping the company register.

In cases for which the regional court has original jurisdiction, the trial is usually a bench trial decided by a single professional judge, but there are several exceptions:

- Suits at employment law or social assistance law are decided by a panel of three judges, one professional judge (Berufsrichter) and two lay judges (Laienrichter). The lay judges are expert lay judges (fachkundige Laienrichter) and are effectively meant to double as court-appointed disinterested expert witnesses.
- Other civil suits can be tried by three-judge panels upon request of the parties if the amount in dispute exceeds EUR 100,000. In cases at mercantile law, the panel consists of two professional judges and one expert lay judge (fachmännischer Laienrichter here). In other cases, the panel consists of three professional judges.
- Criminal trials are held before three-judge panels, four-judge panels, or juries in cases of alleged homicide, sexual assault, robbery, certain types of grand larceny or fraud, and in any case where the alleged crime carries a maximum jail term of more than five years. The specifics are somewhat involved; the following is a rough outline:
  - Most of the cases outlined above go before a three-judge panel consisting of one professional judge and two lay judges (Schöffen).
  - In cases of alleged manslaughter, aggravated robbery, rape, membership in a terrorist organization, abuse of official authority, or financial crimes causing more than EUR 1,000,000 in damage, a second professional judge is added to the panel.
  - Charges of murder, actual terrorist violence, or armed insurrection are jury trials decided by three professional judges and eight jurors (Geschworene). The same is true for treason, a number of other political crimes, and all other crimes with minimum jail terms of more than five and maximum jail terms of more than ten years.

In criminal trials, some effort is made to prevent panels and juries from being biased or unable to empathize with either defendants or alleged victims. If the crime alleged is a sexual assault or some other violation of a person's sexual integrity serious enough to warrant a panel, then at least one of the judges must belong to the same sex as the alleged victim. If there is a jury, then at least two of the jurors must be of the same sex as the alleged victim. If the defendant is juvenile and the alleged crime is serious enough to warrant a panel, then at least one of the judges must be of the same sex as the defendant and at least one of the judges must be a present or former educator or competent social worker. If there is a jury, at least two of the jurors must be of the relevant sex and at least four must have the relevant job experience.

Appeals of district courts decisions to regional courts are decided by three-judge panels: two professional judges and one expert lay judge in trials at mercantile law, three professional judges in all other civil matters and in all criminal cases.

Routine company register decisions are made by single judges or by judicial clerks.

Attached to every regional court dealing with criminal trials, there is a branch of the state prosecution service (Staatsanwaltschaft) and a prison (Justizanstalt). Regional courts and regional-level state prosecutors organize and supervise most of the pre-trial work (Ermittlungsverfahren) in Austria, even in cases in which the main court proceedings (Hauptverfahren) are going to take place in a district court. In many ways, the regional courts are the backbone of the Austrian judiciary.

=== Higher regional courts ===
There are four higher regional courts (Oberlandesgerichte). They are located in Graz, Innsbruck, Linz, and Vienna.

Higher regional courts decide appeals on facts and law (Berufungen) in cases originally tried before regional courts.

As a special case, the higher regional court in Vienna decides antitrust disputes.

Trials before higher regional courts are bench trials decided by panels of either three or five judges: three professional judges and two expert lay judges in employment and social assistance cases, two professional judges and one expert lay judge in all other civil cases, and three professional judges in all criminal trials.

Each higher regional court has a chief public prosecutor's office (Oberstaatsanwaltschaft).

=== Supreme Court of Justice ===
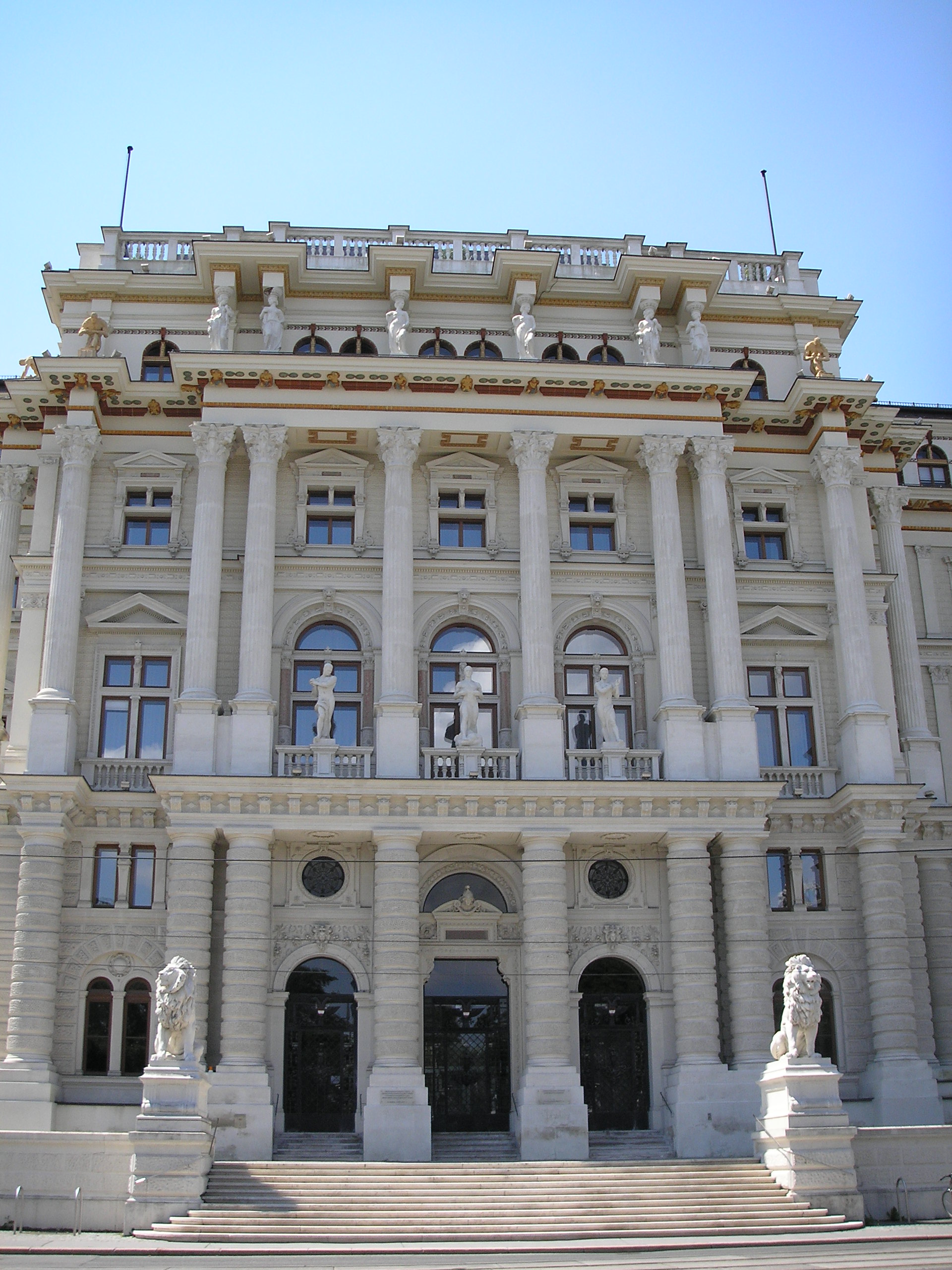
The Palace of Justice, seat of the Supreme Court of Justice since 1881

The Supreme Court of Justice (Oberster Gerichtshof or OGH) hears appeals at law (Revisionen in civil trials, Nichtigkeitsbeschwerden in criminal cases) against verdicts of appellate courts. The court also deals with service-related complaints by jurists against the judiciary and with disciplinary complaints against jurists; it acts as the trial court in cases involving certain senior judges and prosecutors, as an appeals court in cases involving lower-level judges and prosecutors, attorneys, and notaries. In addition to its adjudicative responsibilities, the court is charged with running the Republic's official public law library (the Zentralbibliothek). On the request of the president of the court or the minister of justice, the court produces appraisals of draft legislation presented to the National Council by the government.

The court does not have a fixed number of justices; it consists of a president, a vice president, and as many additional members as Court and cabinet deem necessary and appropriate. As of the early 21st century, there are typically between fifty and sixty judges on the court. As of August 2018, there are 61.

The court is partitioned into 18 panels (Senate) of five members each. One panel exclusively deals with appeals decisions reached by arbitration tribunals; another panel hears to appeals to antitrust verdicts handed down by the Vienna higher regional court, which has specialist exclusive jurisdiction over all Austrian antitrust cases. A third panel handles disciplinary proceedings and other disputes internal to the judiciary. Of the remaining fifteen panels, ten deal with civil cases and five with criminal trials.

The responsibility for appointing justices is vested in the president, but the president can and usually does delegate this task to the minister of justice. The court maintains a special personnel committee (German: Personalsenat) that provides the minister with a shortlist of three candidates in the event of a vacancy. In theory, the minister may appoint any Austrian legally qualified to sit the bench and not excluded by the constitution's rudimentary incompatibility provisions. In practice, the minister dependably picks one of the three candidates nominated by the court.

The Supreme Court of Justice convenes in the Palace of Justice in Vienna.

== Courts of public law ==
The Austrian model of separation of powers forbids the administrative and judicial branches of government from interfering with each other. This peculiarity, established during the neo-absolutist years of the Habsburg monarchy, originally meant that subjects could not take bureaucrats to court or otherwise petition the courts to review the legality of administrative acts. The Constitution of 1920 fixes this problem by establishing the Administrative Court and the Constitutional Court, two tribunals that cut across the division. Pointedly called Gerichtshöfe instead of simply Gerichte, the two tribunals are staffed by lawyer judges and generally behave like courts without technically being courts. The terminology used by most modern English-language literature makes the distinction difficult to see; it remains salient in German texts.

Broadly speaking, the administrative court system reviews administrative acts, the Constitutional Court reviews legislative acts and judicial demarcation conflicts.

=== Constitutional Court ===
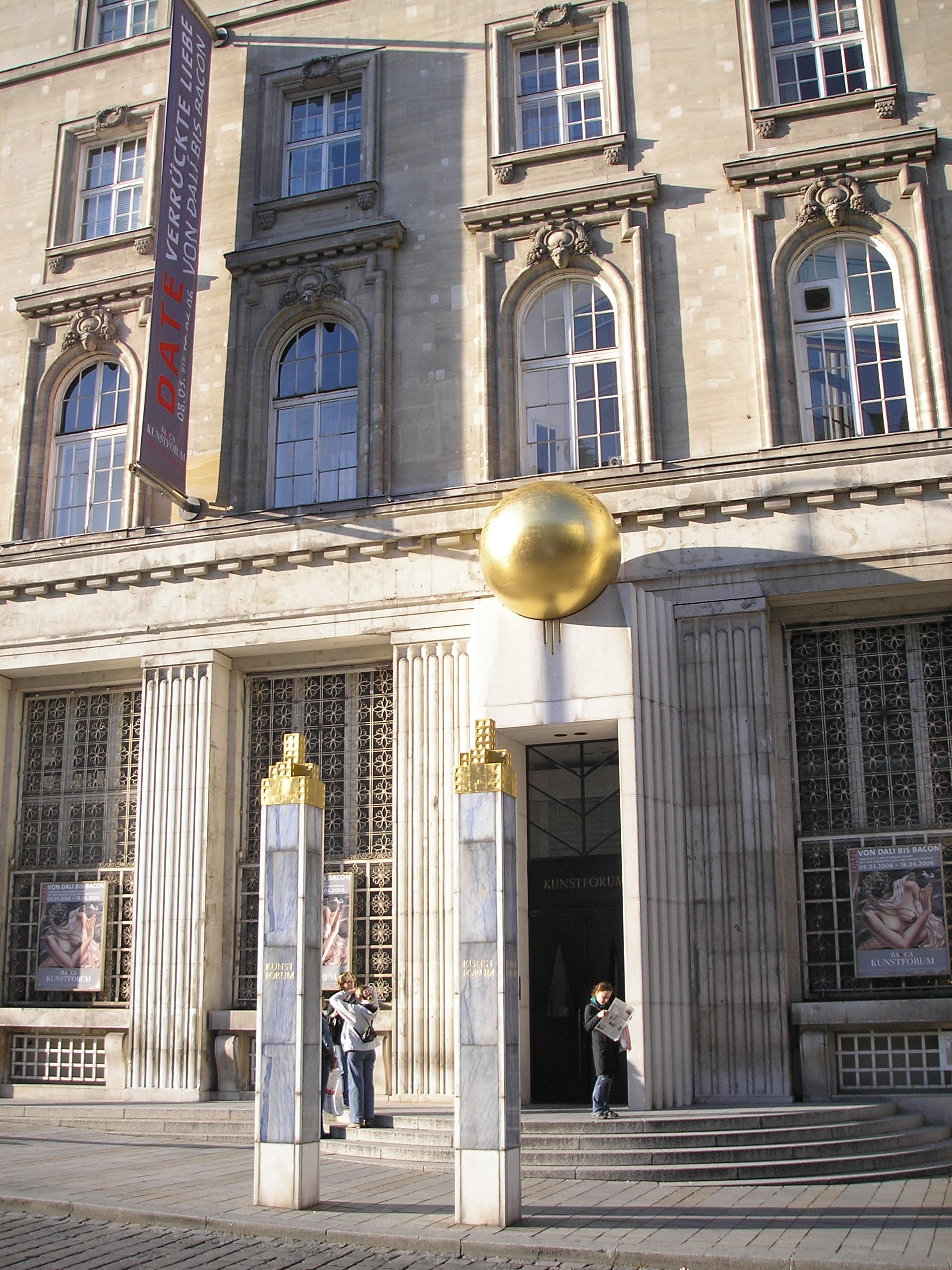
The seat of the Constitutional Court

The Constitutional Court (Verfassungsgerichtshof or VfGH) adjudicates on

- liability claims against Austria, its provinces, and its municipalities;
- demarcation conflicts between courts, between courts and the administration, and between national and regional governments;
- the constitutionality of statutes and the legality of ordinances and other secondary legislation;
- the legality of international treaties;
- election complaints;
- accusations of misconduct in office against certain elected officials and political appointees;
- complaints alleging violations of constitutional rights or the rule of law by the executive branch.

The Constitutional Court is the only court in Austria with the power of judicial review of legislation. The Austrian method of vesting all power to strike legislation in a single specialist court is called the centralized system of judicial review. Because Austria was the first country to adopt this approach when Hans Kelsen created the Constitutional Court in its modern form with the 1920 Kelsen constitution, the approach is sometimes also called the Austrian system. Because the approach has since spread to Germany, Italy, Spain, Portugal, and Belgium, some people call it the European approach.

Legislation can be challenged before the Constitutional Court by any private person, natural or other. The complaint has to argue that the complainant is being violated in their rights by the piece of legislation at issue, actually and not just potentially. The complaint also has to argue that there is no plausible way for the complainant to get the problem resolved through any other procedure. Depending on the type of the statute, ordinance, or treaty, the court can often also be called upon by the national government, by regional governments, or by groups of national or regional legislators.

Legislation can also be challenged by courts that are trying cases for whose outcome it is relevant. Legislation can further be challenged by one of the parties to the a trial, but only after the trial court has handed down its verdict and only if the verdict actually references the piece of legislation in question. Verdicts by administrative trial courts can additionally be challenged on the grounds that they violate the relevant party's constitutional rights in some other way. This possibility lets the Constitutional Court exercise judicial review not just of ordinances but also of individual-scope actions of the executive branch: A citizen who feels violated in their constitutional rights by an administrative decision or assessment files suit in an administrative court. If the administrative court agrees with the complainant, it overrules the administration. If the administrative court does not, the complainant can escalate the matter to the Constitutional Court. If the Constitutional Court agrees with the complainant, it overrules the administrative court, prompting a retrial; it thus potentially also overrules the administration.

Unlike the Supreme Court of Justice and the Supreme Administrative Court, the Constitutional Court is not a court of appeals. It only hears cases it has original jurisdiction over, although the way Austria uses general and administrative courts to vet complaints about unconstitutional legislation and other constitutional rights infringements does present something of an edge case.

The Constitutional Court consists of fourteen members and six substitute members, appointed by the president on nomination of the cabinet, the National Council, and the Federal Council.

In theory, trials before the Constitutional Court are oral, public, and decided by the full plenum. In practice, oral argument and true plenary sessions have become rare because workload is heavy and there are broad exceptions to these general rules; most cases today are decided behind closed doors by panels of either nine or five members. Opinions tend to be concise and academic. Only the actual decision is published; there are no concurring or dissenting opinions.

== History ==
=== March Constitution ===
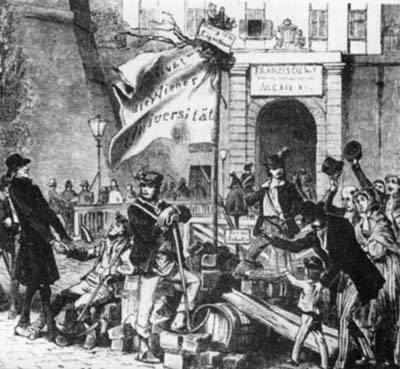
The Revolutions of 1848 set Austria on the path from absolute to constitutional monarchy.

In its modern form, the Austrian judiciary goes back to the March Constitution of 1849.

Throughout the 18th and early 19th century, the Habsburgs had tried to rule as absolute monarchs, holding unrestricted power over their subjects with no constraints due to any kind of feudal social compact and with no interference from any of the estates of their various realms. The Revolutions of 1848 compelled a first step towards constitutional rule. Under intense pressure, Emperor Ferdinand tried to appease the revolutionaries by enacting the Pillersdorf Constitution, a statute that promised increased civil liberties, a limited form of democratic participation in government, and access to independent courts with the power to review administrative acts and halt administrative overreach. Although the document as a whole was fairly short, one of its seven sections was a substantial bill of rights that was modern for the time.

The appeasement failed to stem the crisis; Ferdinand had to abdicate. His successor, Franz Joseph succeeded in ending the protests by promulgating the March Constitution, a set of edicts that built on the Pillersdorf Constitution but included a number of additional concessions.

The constitution established a number of principles that remain in force until the present day:

- The judicial powers and responsibilities of landlords, cities, and ecclesiastical corporations are abolished; all disputes are adjudicated by the State, in courts explicitly created by statutory law and according to procedure explicitly set forth in statutory law. (§20, §100)
- Justices have judicial independence. (§101)
- Judiciary and executive are separate powers; court system and bureaucracy cannot squash each other's decisions or otherwise interfere in each other's domains. (§102)
- Criminal trials are inquisitorial trials (Anklageprozesse). While the judge is tasked with actively searching for the truth as opposed to merely refereeing, however, judge and prosecutor are separate entities. The older form of inquisitorial system, in which judge and prosecutor are the same party (Inquisitionsprozesse proper in German) is no longer used. (§103)
- Trials are oral and public. (§103)
- Political trials are jury trials. (§103)

Subsequent legislation pursuant to the March Constitution created a court system that also survives, with a few significant but narrow alterations, until this day. Most notably, the outline defined by the constitution was fleshed by the Constitution of the courts (Gerichtsverfassungsgesetz or GVG) of 1849 and the Penal Procedure Code (Strafprozessordnung or StPO) of 1850:

- The court system is a hierarchy with five levels: district, district collegiate, regional, higher regional, and supreme; (§1 GVG, §8 StPO)
  - District courts (Bezirksgerichte);
  - District collegiate courts (Bezirkskollegialgerichte);
  - Regional courts (Landesgerichte);
  - Higher regional courts (Oberlandesgerichte);
  - Supreme Court (Oberster Gerichts- und Kassationshof)
- District courts are trial courts with single judges handling civil disputes and minor misdemeanors. (§§2−9 GVG, §9 StPO)
- District collegiate courts are trial courts with panels of judges trying more serious transgressions. (§§10−11 GVG, §§10−13 StPO)
- Regional courts are trial courts with panels of judges trying serious crimes, in some cases assisted by juries, but also appellate courts hearing appeals to verdicts of district and district collegiate courts in their respective regions. (§§12−18 GVG, §§14−16 StPO)
- Higher regional courts and the Supreme Court only have appellate jurisdiction.
- A professional body of state attorneys (Staatsanwaltschaft) represents the State in court where necessary; most notably, the state attorney's offices act as a professional prosecution service, charging defendants and presenting the case against them before the judge. Regional and higher courts have state attorneys' offices attached to them; the state attorneys working at the regional court level are the backbone of the service. Trials before district courts are usually handled through assistants and proxies. (§29 GVG, §§51−60 StPO)
- Appeals are limited. Verdicts in civil cases can be appealed up only once; verdicts in criminal cases can be appealed up twice. Appeals in point of law and pleas in nullity may still be possible even when regular appeals are exhausted, but the specifics are complicated. (§2 GVG, §§352−390 StPO)

The main differences between the court system of the March Constitution and the court system as it exists today are the district collegiate courts, since abolished, the comparatively wide purview of the state attorneys, since narrowed, and the fact that there is no judicial review. The separation of powers between judiciary and executive was complete; courts could not overrule the bureaucracy just as the bureaucracy could not overrule the courts. The also was no mechanism for courts to squash unconstitutional legislation. The need for a judicial review of laws was simply not felt at the time. In modern Austria, the main seat of power (Machtzentrum) is the legislature and the Constitutional Court is the monitoring authority acting as a check on it. In the philosophical framework of 19th-century Austria, the imperial court was the main seat of power and the legislature was meant to be the monitoring authority.

=== Return to absolutism ===
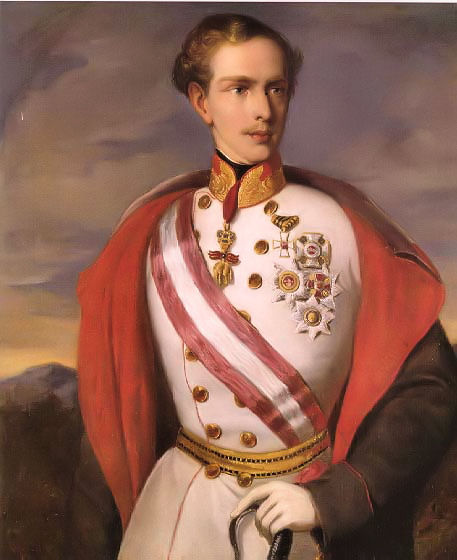
Emperor Franz Joseph spent much of his early reign trying to reassert unqualified sovereignty.

Since the March Constitution was decreed (oktroyiert) by the crown as opposed to enacted by the people or agreed upon by the empire's constituent crown lands, Franz Joseph felt at liberty to walk back on his promises as soon as he had regained a firm grip on his subjects. The Constitution (Verfassung) was abrogated in 1852 and replaced with a number of "constitutional principles" (Verfassungsgrundsätze) that sounded vaguely progressive but did not actually bind the ruling house to any real degree. Franz Joseph was trying to return to absolutist rule.

Jury trials were abolished. A complete rewrite of the Penal Procedure Code in 1853 reintroduced old-style inquisitorial trials. Judges lost their independence. State attorneys continued to exist but lost most of their responsibilities; they were essentially reduced to their function as public prosecutors, and comparatively powerless ones at that. Trials were no longer public. Trials before higher regional courts and the supreme court were no longer oral. On the district level, the separation of powers was abandoned, at least on paper. District courts were merged into district administrative offices, although in practice district judges continued to operate much as they had before.

The return to absolutism ultimately failed. The continuing rise of civic nationalism and continuing demands by Austria's Hungarian and Slavic subjects for material autonomy, exacerbated by a series of diplomatic setbacks, kept eroding the cohesion of the empire and the personal authority of the Emperor. By 1861, Franz Joseph was forced to grant a third constitution. Following his defeat in the Austro-Prussian War in 1866, he was forced to give up for good on his desire to remain the sole sovereign and font of law. In the Austro-Hungarian Compromise of 1867, the Kingdom of Hungary received near-complete independence. Shortly thereafter, the remainder of the empire received the December Constitution, a fourth and final set of fundamental laws that the Emperor would no longer be able to unilaterally scrap.

=== December Constitution ===
As far as civil and criminal jurisprudence was concerned, the December Constitution mostly just resurrected the principles originally stipulated in 1849. Judges regained their autonomy and independence, although state attorneys remained limited to their narrow role as prosecutors. The constitution restored full separation of powers, including on the district level. District courts, accordingly, were detached from district administrative offices again. District collegiate courts, on the other hand, were not; they were simply abandoned.

The system of general courts now had the same four rungs it still has today:

- District courts (Bezirksgerichte);
- Regional courts (now called Kreisgerichte instead of Landesgerichte);
- Higher regional courts (still called Oberlandesgerichte);
- Supreme Court (Oberster Gerichts- und Kassationshof).

The December Constitution did more than merely revive suspended institutions, however. One of its parts, the Basic Law on the General Rights of Nationals (Staatsgrundgesetz über die allgemeinen Rechte der Staatsbürger) was a second bill of rights that was a significant improvement over its 1848 precursor. Other parts of the constitution entrenched the rule of law and made it clear that Habsburg subjects would from now on be able to take the State to court should it violate their fundamental rights. Since regular courts were still unable to overrule the bureaucracy, much less the legislature, these guarantees necessitated the creation of specialist courts that could:

- The Administrative Court (Verwaltungsgerichtshof), stipulated by the 1867 Basic Law on Judicial Power (Staatsgrundgesetz über die richterliche Gewalt) and implemented in 1876, had the power to review the legality of administrative acts, ensuring that the executive branch remained faithful to the principle of the rule of law.
- The Imperial Court (Reichsgericht), stipulated by the Basic Law on the Creation of an Imperial Court (Staatsgrundgesetz über die Einrichtung eines Reichsgerichtes) in 1867 and implemented in 1869, decided demarcation conflicts between courts and the bureaucracy, between its constituent crown lands, and between one of the crown lands and the Empire itself. It also adjudicated on financial liability claims raised by crown lands against each other, by a crown land against the Empire, by the Empire against a crown land, or by a person, corporation, or municipality against a crown land or the Empire. Last but not least, the Imperial Court also heard complaints of citizens who alleged to have been violated in their constitutional rights, although its powers were not cassatory: it could only vindicate the complainant by declaring the government to be in the wrong, not by actually voiding its wrongful decisions.
- The State Court (Staatsgerichtshof) held the Emperor's ministers accountable for political misconduct committed in office. The State Court was an oblique and roundabout way of keeping the Emperor himself in check. The Emperor could not be taken to court, but under the terms of the Law on the Responsibility of Ministers (Gesetz über die Verantwortlichkeit der Minister) of 1867 he was no longer an autocrat; many of his decrees and injunctions now depended on the relevant minister to countersign them. The double-pronged approach of making the Emperor dependent on his ministers and also making ministers criminally liable for bad outcomes would firstly enable, secondly motivate the ministers to put pressure on the monarch. The statute in question actually predates the Constitution by a few months, but the Constitution conspicuously failed to abrogate it; it also expressly confirmed the legal inviolability of the person of the Emperor himself.

The December Constitution thus created the distinction between general courts and courts of public law.

=== First Republic ===
The December Constitution remained in force essentially unaltered until the end of the Habsburg monarchy in 1918.

The end of Austria-Hungary was not a collapse so much as an explosion. Hungary broke away from Austria. The Slavic peoples of Austria broke away from the German-speaking heartland, all essentially at the same time, and started establishing the nation states they had been demanding for decades. The German-speaking remnant was demoralized, rudderless, and crippled by partisan strife. The monarchy was discredited and its administration with it. None of the rump state's various legislative bodies had any real authority either. Provincial legislatures had been elected using a system of curia suffrage, meaning they had no democratic legitimacy. The House of Deputies, the lower chamber of the Imperial Council, had been elected democratically, but the last election had been held in 1911. Political left and political right agreed that Austria should become a democratic republic but had fundamentally different ideas regarding many other aspects of their future constitutional framework.

In acknowledgment of their questionable standing, the remaining deputies decided to meet not as the House of Deputies but as the Provisional National Assembly. The Assembly would only make decisions that could not be delayed; it would retain as much as possible of the existing body of constitutional law until general elections could be held and a properly legitimized Constituting National Assembly could be convoked. In particular, the Provisional Assembly made no drastic changes to the court system; it mainly updated the system of courts of public law:

- The Administrative Court was retained.
- The State Court was disbanded. In its original form, it was pointless without a monarch in possession of permanent and unqualified immunity; besides, it had never actually convened. The responsibility for holding top officials accountable was transferred to a special committee of the Provisional National Assembly.
- The Imperial Court was renamed to Constitutional Court (Verfassungsgerichtshof). In April 1919, the government transferred the responsibilities of the former State Court to the Constitutional Court and also gave the Constitutional Court cassatory power: from now on, the court could not just note the unconstitutionality of an administrative decision, it could actually annul it, sending complainant and defendant back to square one.
- A special Election Court (Wahlgerichtshof) was created to handle complaints regarding the upcoming Constituting Assembly election.

The only other significant change involved the Supreme Court: its name was shortened to its modern form.

The new, permanent Kelsen constitution of 1920 finally gave the Constitutional Court the power of judicial review. The court was now able to void regulations that violated the law and laws that violated the constitution. It also acquired responsibility for handling election complaints; the Kelsen constitution did not retain the Election Court.

Austrian courts other than the Constitutional Court have no power of judicial review to this day; they cannot strike or refuse to apply laws they consider unconstitutional, although they can (and are required to) refuse to apply laws they think have not been constitutionally enacted or promulgated. A court that suspects a statute at issue may be unconstitutional has the right (and the obligation) to refer the matter to the Constitutional Court. The literature calls this approach the centralized system of judicial review. Because Austria was in fact the first country ever to adopt this system and because it has since spread to Germany, Italy, Spain, Portugal, and Belgium, it is also called the "Austrian" or "European" model.

The Revisions of 1925 and 1929 made no further changes to the court system.
