= Supreme Administrative Court of Austria =

Supreme Administrative Court
- Verwaltungsgerichtshof
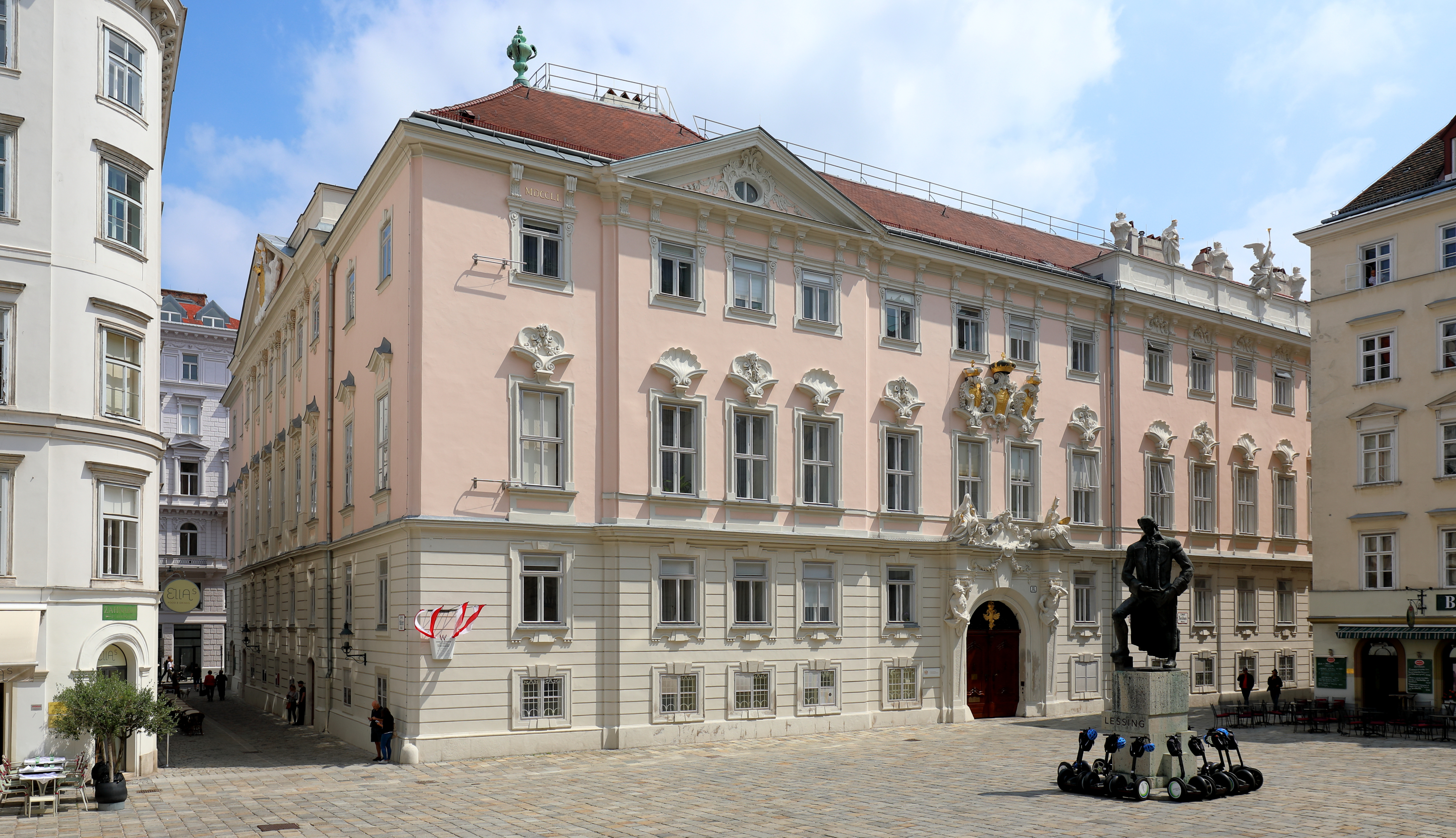
- Established: 1876
- Jurisdiction: Austria
- Location: Judenplatz 11, Vienna
- Website: vwgh.gv.at (in English)

President
- Currently: Albert Posch
- Since: 1 September 2025

Vice President
- Currently: Bettina Maurer-Kober
- Since: 1 July 2025

In the Republic of Austria, the Supreme Administrative Court (German: Verwaltungsgerichtshof or VwGH) is the appellate court to which appeals may be made from the decisions of the country's eleven administrative trial courts. The Supreme Administrative Court also resolves demarcation disputes within the administrative court system and hears complaints about administrative trial courts that fail to issue verdicts legally required of them in a timely manner.

The court does not have a fixed number of members. The theoretical minimum is seven; the actual number, as of June 2018, is about seventy. Members are appointed by the President of Austria on nomination of the cabinet. With respect to most appointments, the cabinet is limited to choosing from a shortlist of three candidates provided by the court. The court is subdivided into 21 panels of three to five members each, each panel handling cases in a specific area of law.

The current president of the Supreme Administrative Court, appointed in June 2025, is Albert Posch.

== Background ==
General courts have no power of judicial review in Austria. Judicial review of Austrian legislation is provided by a specialized Constitutional Court. Judicial review of acts of the executive branch, broadly speaking, is the responsibility of a system of specialized administrative courts. However, there are some exceptions:

- Complaints regarding the legality of executive ordinances are handled not by the administrative courts but by the Constitutional Court. Only the Constitutional Court has the power to strike legislation. Since secondary legislation counts as legislation, this applies to ordinances just as it applies to statutes;
- Misconduct by executive authorities acting in their capacity as regular economic operators is dealt with by the general courts. For example, if the police fails to settle an invoice, the claimant files a civil suit in the appropriate district court or regional court; the police has not done anything a private individual or business could not have done as well. If the police fails to refund an improperly imposed fine, on the other hand, the claimant files suit in an administrative court; the claim derives from a decision the police has made in its capacity as a government authority. This exception has exceptions itself; some types of liability claims against Austria, its states, or its municipalities are handled, again, not by administrative courts but by the Constitutional Court.

Generally meaning, the administrative courts hear complaints about decisions made by executive officials that

- specifically involve their government authority;
- are not broadly legislative in nature but affect specific, individual persons.

The constitution provides a taxative enumeration of the types of decisions that can be fought in an administrative court:

- written rulings and assessments (German: Bescheide);
- face-to-face personal orders, the use of physical force, or threats of the use of physical force (Maßnahmen);
- refusal to act when the public administration would be legally required to act (Säumnis);
- certain types of directives (Weisungen) issued by the government to school administrators.

The administrative court system has two levels: administrative trial courts (Verwaltungsgerichte, singular Verwaltungsgericht), which have original jurisdiction, and the Supreme Administrative Court (Verwaltungsgerichtshof), which hears appeals against the decisions of the trial courts and which supervises them in other respects as well.

== Name ==
The international scholarly literature generally translates Verwaltungsgerichtshof as "Supreme Administrative Court".

Prior to 2014, a minority of authors made strict use of the literal translation, which is simply "Administrative Court". The literal translation was unambiguous at the time because every other tribunal of the administrative court system was called not a "court" (Gericht or Gerichtshof) but a "senate" (Senat). A 2014 reform of the administrative court system replaced the senates with Verwaltungsgerichte, singular Verwaltungsgericht, a word that also translates to "Administrative Court". The reform thus rendered the literal translation impractical.

The court refers to itself as "Supreme Administrative Court" in the English version of its website.

== Powers and responsibilities ==
=== Appeals ===
The Supreme Administrative Court hears appeals against verdicts handed down by administrative trial courts.

Appeals to the Supreme Administrative Court are appeals at law (Revisionen). There are no appeals on facts and law (Berufungen) like there are in the general court system, and even appeals at law are more difficult to get accepted. The court has comparatively little latitude in deciding which appeals to hear and which to decline; statutes lay down detailed rules:

- The court has to hear the appeal if the case raises a question of law of wider importance (grundsätzliche Rechtsfrage). It has to decline hearing the appeal if not. The court has to assume that a question of law is of wider importance if the verdict in question appears inconsistent with a decision the court has handed down in the past, if it has never dealt with the question before, or if it has dealt with the question multiple times and the relevant decisions appear to be inconsistent with each other. The court may decide that a question of law is of wider importance even in the absence of any of these factors.
- The court does not hear appeals of verdicts that uphold trivial administrative fines, in cases in which no significant fine and no imprisonment would have been possible even in theory. If the offense at issue is finable but not jailable, the maximum fine does not exceed €750, and the actual fine imposed does not exceed €400, the court is not permitted to take the case.

=== Complaints about negligent trial courts ===
The Supreme Administrative Court hears complaints about an administrative trial court's failure to issue a verdict in a timely manner.

The right to complain to the Supreme Administrative Court about a negligent administrative trial court (Fristsetzungantrag) is closely linked to the right to complain to an administrative trial court about negligent bureaucrats (Säumnisbeschwerde). On the one hand, a complaint to an administrative court does not necessarily have suspensory effect. On the other hand, administrative trial courts are not just cassatory but reformatory: they cannot merely void administrative decisions but can issue substantive decisions themselves. Inactivity on the part of an administrative trial court can therefore hurt a complainant in much the same way as inactivity on the part of the bureaucracy can.

=== Demarcation conflicts ===
The court resolves demarcation conflicts between two administrative trial courts, or between an administrative trial court and the Supreme Administrative Court itself.

The Supreme Administrative Court does not resolve demarcation conflicts between the administrative court system and other parts of the Austrian judiciary, between judiciary and executive, or between different parts of the executive branch; disputes of these kinds fall within the purview of the Constitutional Court.

== Composition ==
The Supreme Administrative Court consists of a president, a vice president, and as many additional members as court and cabinet deem necessary and appropriate. The theoretical minimum number of members of the court is seven. In the early 2010s, the actual number was about sixty. By 2016, the member count had risen to about seventy.

Justices are appointed by the President of Austria on nomination of the cabinet:

- The president and the vice president of the court are chosen by the cabinet.
- Additional members are chosen by the cabinet from a shortlist of three candidates provided by the court itself.

Nominees must have a law degree and must have spent at least ten years working in a position that actually requires a law degree; they do not need to be licensed to practice law in any particular capacity. In particular, they do not need to be members of the judiciary (Richterstand); members of the judiciary are jurists who have completed post-graduate training for the judgeship and have passed the exam that makes them eligible for appointment to the bench of a general court.

Nominees cannot be members of a national or provincial cabinet or legislative body.

== Process ==
For the purpose of actually trying cases, the court is partitioned into 21 panels (Senate) of either three or five members. Each panel is responsible for cases in a specific area of law − asylum law, aliens' law, procurement law, housing and construction law, and so on. Panels dealing with administrative penal cases have three members; all other panels have five. If a panel of five is dealing with a question with regards to which existing Supreme Administrative Court case law is inconsistent, the panel has to add an additional four members. The panel also has to add an additional four members if it notices it is moving towards a verdict that overturns existing case law; the quorum for any decision that throws out precedent is nine justices.

Plenary sessions of the Supreme Administrative Court are rare. A plenary session is required to make alterations to the panels system, to change the court's internal rules of procedure in some other way, to choose shortlists of nominees for appointment to the court, and to authorize the yearly activity report.

A new case that comes before the court is first assigned to the relevant panel by the president of the court. One of the members of the panel is appointed case manager (Berichter). The case manager directs the preliminary investigation research. An office staffed with about 45 researchers and other assistants is attached to the court to aid case managers in this task. Once the preliminary investigation is complete, the panel convenes, hears the official presentation of case and research by the case manager, deliberates, and votes. The case manager votes first, the chair votes last; other members vote in order of decreasing seniority. Members are required to vote; abstentation is not permitted. Cases are decided by a simple majority.

Generally speaking, panels do not hear oral argument, and their sessions are not public. Parties to the trial may petition the panel to open the session to the public and hear oral argument. In theory, the panel has to grant the request, but the relevant statute defines several classes of exceptions to this rule that are broad enough to render it meaningless in practice. The panel may also decide to open the session to the public and hear oral argument on its own initiative; it does so only very rarely.
