= Andrea Mayer =

Austrian politician (born 1962)

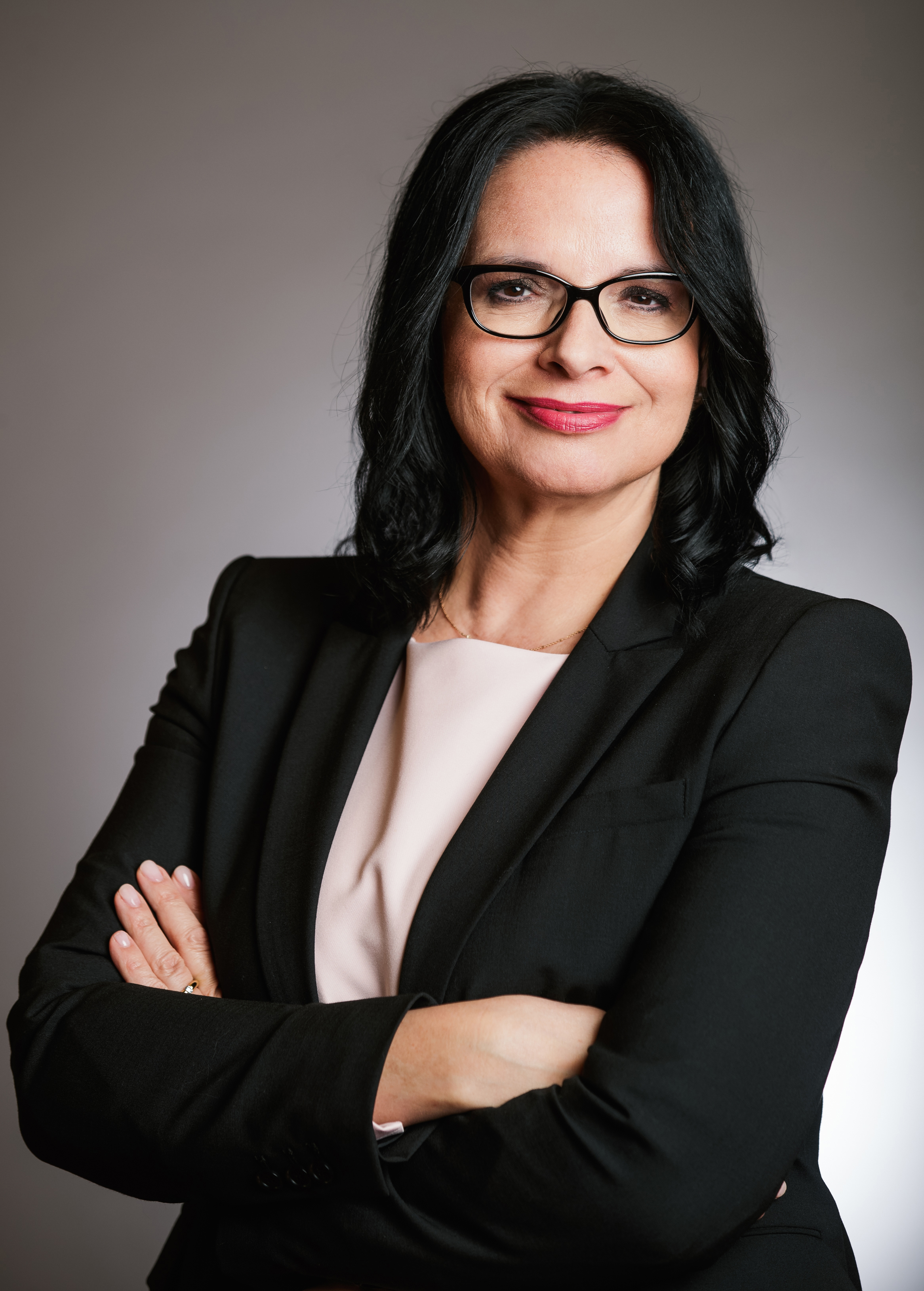
- Mayer in 2020

State Secretary in the Federal Ministry for Arts, Culture, the Civil Service and Sport
- In office 20 May 2020 – 2 October 2024
- Preceded by: Ulrike Lunacek

Personal details
- Born: April 19, 1962 (age 62); Amstetten, Austria
- Education: University of Vienna

Andrea Mayer (born April 19, 1962), during her marriage Andrea Ecker, is an Austrian politician and current cabinet director of the Presidential Chancellery. From 2020 until 2024, she served as state secretary in the Federal Ministry for Arts, Culture, the Civil Service and Sport in the Second Kurz, Schallenberg, and Nehammer governments, nominated by the Greens.

== Career ==
Born in Amstetten, Lower Austria, Mayer studied German and history as well as jurisprudence at the University of Vienna and graduated with the academic degree Magistra. She then worked in the private sector for a few years. In 1993 she became a member of the staff of Education and Culture Minister Rudolf Scholten. She later moved to the Ministry of Science, where she was responsible for innovation and research. In 2007, she was appointed Minister of Culture Claudia Schmied appointed as head of the art section. In 2015, following an advertisement, she prevailed against 17 applicants for the management of the now merged Art and Culture Section and was appointed to this position by Chancellery Minister Josef Ostermayer. She took on control functions in various supervisory bodies of large cultural institutions, such as the Salzburg Festival, and in 2016 she was interim head of the Belvedere Board of Trustees.

In February 2017, she was appointed, the first woman in this position, by Alexander Van der Bellen as head of cabinet in the presidential office. Companions describe their temperament "as ambitious, more pragmatic than creative and characterized by perseverance. Nobody wants to deny her willingness to grow with big tasks. After all, she always did her work properly and to the satisfaction of her superiors."

In May 2020, several Austrian media saw her as the favorite to succeed Ulrike Lunacek in the State Secretariat for Art and Culture. At the same time, she was described by a number of people from the Austrian cultural scene as competent and suitable for the task, including Klaus Albrecht Schröder (Albertina) and Herbert Föttinger (Theater in der Josefstadt), as well as "excellently qualified" and "culturally affine". She also received advance praise from Sabine Haag (Kunsthistorisches Museum), Helga Rabl-Stadler (Salzburg Festival), Johanna Rachinger (Austrian National Library), Marie Rötzer (Landestheater Niederösterreich), from the Vienna Volksoper and the Bregenz Festival and from Gerhard Ruiss (IG authors). Ruiss: "I know her to be very energetic, but in a pleasant way, and very committed to the cause. We need it now, we need it now very urgently!"

She was appointed State Secretary by the Federal Executive of the Greens on May 18, 2020, and sworn in by Federal President Alexander Van der Bellen on May 20, 2020. In the Time in Picture 2 of the same day, she announced that she had suspended her membership of the Social Democratic Party. She does not intend to become a member of the Greens.

Mayer is the mother of twins.
