= President of Austria =

Head of state

- Bundespräsident der Republik Österreich
- Coat of arms

- State flag

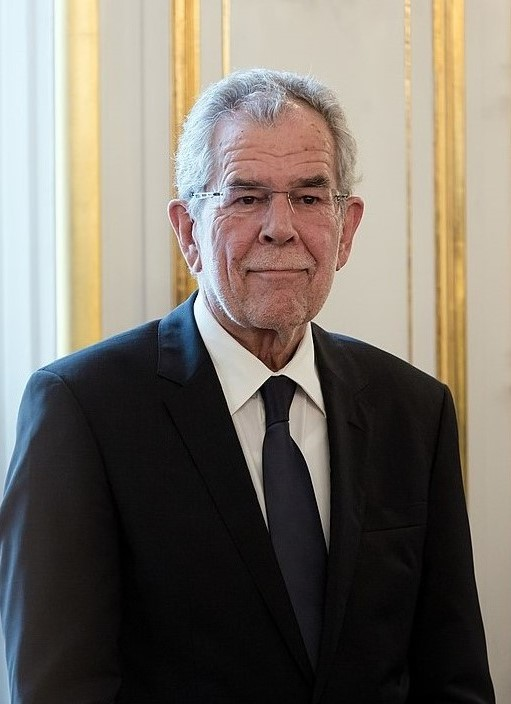
- Incumbent; Alexander Van der Bellen since 26 January 2017
- Style: Mr. President; His Excellency
- Type: Head of state
- Status: Supreme executive organ
- Member of: Presidential Chancellery
- Seat: Leopoldine Wing, Hofburg Imperial Palace; Innere Stadt, Vienna
- Nominator: Political parties or self-nomination
- Appointer: Direct popular vote sworn in by the Federal Assembly
- Term length: Six years, renewable once consecutively
- Constituting instrument: Constitution of Austria (1960)
- Precursor: Emperor of Austria
- Formation: Creation: 10 November 1920 (105 years ago); Restoration: 27 April 1945 (81 years ago)
- First holder: Karl Seitz
- Abolished: Anschluss: 13 March 1938 (88 years ago) (later restored)
- Succession: Line of succession
- Salary: €349,398 annually
- Website: bundespraesident.at

The president of Austria (German: Bundespräsident der Republik Österreich, lit. 'Federal President of the Republic of Austria') is the head of state of the Republic of Austria.

The office of the president was established in 1920 by the Constituent National Assembly of the first republic following the collapse of the Austro-Hungarian Empire and the Habsburg monarchy in 1918. As head of state, the president indirectly succeeded the emperor of Austria. The power and role of the presidency has varied drastically over time. During the early first republic, the president was an utterly powerless figurehead. After a 1929 amendment, the president's powers were greatly expanded on paper, but they were swiftly taken away again following the abrogation of the Constitution and the erection of a corporatist dictatorship in 1934. When Nazi Germany annexed Austria in 1938, the presidency was completely abolished. Following the liberation of Austria by the allied forces in 1945, the republican Constitution was restored and so was the office of the president. Though the president nominally regained the broad power vested in him under the 1929 amendments, the president voluntarily chose to serve as a ceremonial and symbolic figurehead, allowing the chancellor to remain de facto chief executive instead. Since the institution of the popular vote in 1951, only nominees of the Social Democratic Party and the People's Party were elected to the presidency, until Green-endorsed incumbent Alexander Van der Bellen won it in 2017.

The most notable presidential power is the appointment of the chancellor, the vice chancellor and the ministers, which collectively form the Cabinet of Austria. The president also signs bills into law, appoints the justices of the Supreme Courts, signs treaties and exercises various ceremonial duties. Additionally, the president is empowered to remove the chancellor and the Cabinet, dissolve the National Council and the State Legislatures, rule by decree and oversee the Armed Forces but these powers have never or rarely been used. The president ranks first in Austria's order of precedence, ahead of the Presidium of the National Council and the chancellor.

The workplace and official residence of the president is located in the Leopoldine Wing of the Hofburg Imperial Palace in Vienna.

== History ==
=== Background ===
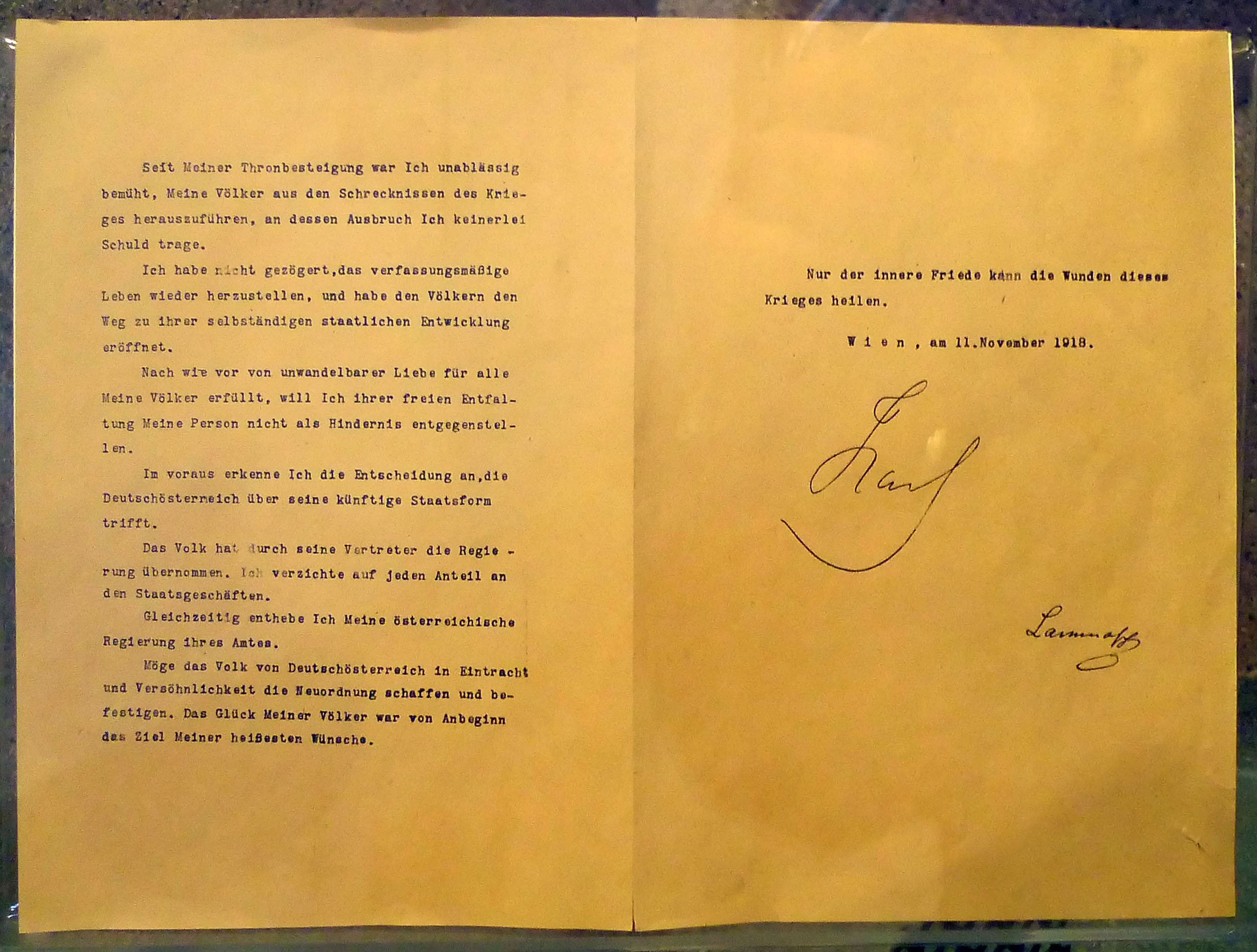
The "Abdication Proclamation" of Emperor Charles I.

Prior to the collapse of the multinational Austro-Hungarian Empire towards the end of World War I, what now is the Republic of Austria had been part of a monarchy with an emperor as its head of state and chief executive. The empire noticeably began to fracture in late 1917 and manifestly disintegrated into a number of independent rump states over the course of the following year.

As the emperor had grown practically powerless, the members of the lower chamber of the Imperial Council – representing Cisleithania, including the empire's ethnically German provinces – formed a Provisional National Assembly for their paralyzed country on 21 October 1918. On 30 October, the National Assembly passed the Staatsgründungsbeschluss, the law that proclaimed the creation of German-Austria and served as its provisional constitution. Additionally, the National Assembly appointed three coequal chairmen, one of them being Karl Seitz, and established a State Council to administer the executive branch. For about two weeks, the Empire and German-Austria co-existed, having a roughly similar population and territory.

On 11 November, Emperor Charles I dissolved the Imperial Cabinet and officially renounced any participation in government affairs but did not abdicate, seeing this move only as a temporary break from his rule. However, the next day, the National Assembly proclaimed German-Austria to be a republic. Despite the effective dissolution of the Empire, the monarchy officially still continued to exist and Emperor Charles I continued exercising ceremonial powers as German-Austria refused to be seen as the successor to Austria-Hungary and thus the monarchy was not legally abolished; only following the passage of the Habsburg Law in April 1919, the monarchy formally ceased to exist and Charles I was dethroned and exiled.

The State Council assumed the remaining powers and responsibilities of the emperor, while the three assembly chairmen – as chairmen of the State Council – became the country's collective head of state.

=== Establishment ===
On 2 March 1919, the Constituent National Assembly, the first parliament to be elected by universal suffrage, convened and named Seitz its chairman a day later. The National Assembly disbanded the State Council on 15 March – hence Seitz became the sole head of state – and began drafting a new Constitution the same year. The Christian Social Party advocated creating a presidency with comprehensive executive powers, similar to the presidency of the Weimar Republic. However, the Social Democratic Worker's Party, fearing that such a president would become a "substitute emperor", favored reverting to a parliamentary presidium acting as collective head of state. In the end, the framers of the Constitution opted for a compromise, creating a presidency that was separate from the legislature but lacked even nominal power.

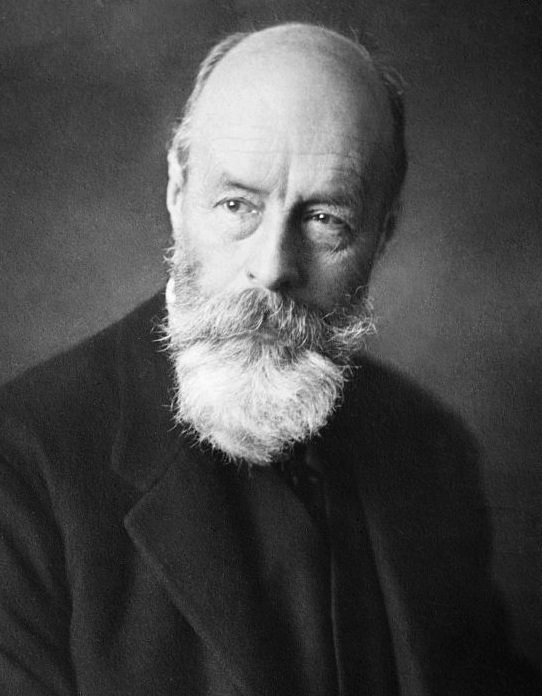
Michael Hainisch, the first president of Austria

On 1 October, the Federal Constitutional Law, the centerpiece of the new Constitution, was ratified by the National Assembly and on 10 November, it became effective, making Seitz president of Austria in all but name. The new Constitution established the president to be elected by the Federal Assembly, a joint session of both houses of the now-bicameral Parliament. On 9 December 1920, the Federal Assembly elected Michael Hainisch as the first official president of Austria.

=== First Republic ===
The parliamentary system erected by the new Constitution was highly unpopular with the majority of the population. This led to surging support for the authoritarian and paramilitary Heimwehr movement, which preferred a system that strengthens presidential authority. On 7 December 1929, under growing pressure from the Heimwehr, the Constitution was amended to give the president sweeping executive and legislative power. Although most of these powers were to be exercised through the ministers, on paper the president now had powers equivalent to those of presidents in presidential systems. It also called for the office to be elected by popular vote and expanded the president's term to six years. The first election was scheduled for 1934. However, owing to the financial ramifications of the Great Depression, all parties agreed to suspend the election in favor of having Wilhelm Miklas reelected by the Federal Assembly.

Three years later, Engelbert Dollfuss and the Fatherland Front tore down Austrian parliamentarism altogether, formally annulling the Constitution on 1 May 1934. It was replaced by an authoritarian and corporatist system of government that concentrated power in the hands of the chancellor, not the president. Miklas was stripped of the authority he had gained in 1929, but agreed to act as a figurehead for the sake of institutional continuity anyway. He was not entirely powerless, however; during the Anschluss crisis, he provided some of the stiffest resistance to Nazi demands. He technically remained in office until 13 March 1938, the day Austria was annexed by Nazi Germany and thus lost its sovereignty. The annexation was legally formalised after Austria and Germany simultaneously passed what was effectively the same law; a plebiscite with 99% support was intended to give the Anschluss additional democratic legitimacy.

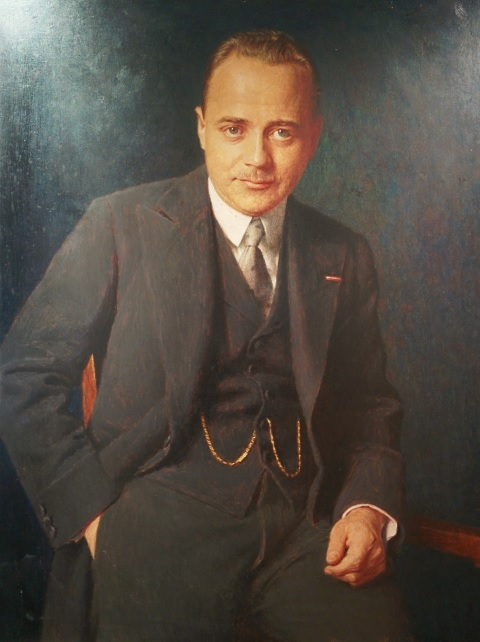
Chancellor Engelbert Dollfuss played a key role in the history of fascism (1934).

=== Second Republic ===
When Austria was re-established as an independent state on 27 April 1945, the party leaders forming the provisional cabinet decided not to write a new constitution, instead reverting to that of 1920, as amended in 1929. Even though this revision was still somewhat controversial at that point, it was part of Austria's most recent constitutional framework, giving it at least some much-needed form of democratic legitimacy. The party leaders were also afraid that lengthy discussion might provoke the Red Army, then in control of Vienna, to barge in and impose Communist rule. The Constitution thus reenacted, effective 1 May, therefore still entailed the provision calling for popular election of the president. Following the November 1945 legislative election, however, the Federal Assembly temporarily suspended this provision and installed Karl Renner as president of Austria as of 20 December. The suspension in question seemed to have been motivated mainly by a lack of money; no attempt was ever made to prolong it, and Renner had already been the universally accepted, de facto head of state anyway. Starting with the 1951 election of Renner's successor Theodor Körner, all presidents have in fact been elected by the people.

Since the restoration of the republic, presidents have taken an increasingly passive role in day-to-day politics (Rollenverzicht) and are rarely ever the focus of the press, except during presidential elections and political upheavals. A notable exception was Kurt Waldheim, who became the subject of national and international controversy, after his service in the Wehrmacht and the Sturmabteilung were revealed to the public. Another exception was Thomas Klestil, who attempted to assume a far more active political role; he called for the grand coalition to remain in power and demanded to represent Austria in the European Council but ultimately failed on both counts.

Alexander Van der Bellen (generally associated with the Green Party) became the first president not affiliated with either of the two dominant parties – the Social Democratic Party and the People's Party – and the first president to dismiss a chancellor as well as an entire Cabinet as a result of a parliamentary ouster.

== Election ==
=== Procedure ===
The president of Austria is elected by popular vote for a term of six years and is limited to two consecutive terms of office. Voting is open to all people entitled to vote in general parliamentary elections, which in practice means that suffrage is universal for all Austrian citizens over the age of sixteen that have not been convicted of a jail term of more than one year of imprisonment. (Even so, they regain the right to vote six months after their release from prison.)

Until 1 October 2011, anyone entitled to vote in elections to the National Council who was at least 35 years of age, and who was not part of any ruling or formerly ruling dynastic houses, was eligible to be elected president. The latter prohibition, primarily aimed at members of the House of Habsburg, was abolished by Wahlrechtsänderungsgesetz 2011 (Amendment of the law on the right to vote 2011), championed by Ulrich Habsburg-Lothringen.

The president is elected under the two-round system. This means that if no candidate receives an absolute majority (i.e. more than 50%) of valid votes cast in the first round, then a second ballot occurs in which only those two candidates who received the greatest number of votes in the first round may stand. However, the constitution also provides that the group that nominates one of these two candidates may instead nominate an alternative candidate in the second round. If there is only one candidate standing in a presidential election then the electorate is granted the opportunity to either accept or reject the candidate in a referendum.

While in office the president cannot belong to an elected body or hold any other position.

=== Oath of office ===
Article 62 of the Austrian Constitution provides that the president must take the following oath or affirmation of office in the presence of the Federal Assembly (although the addition of a religious asseveration is admissible):

I solemnly swear that I will faithfully observe the Constitution and all the laws of the Republic and fulfill my duty to the best of my knowledge and conscience.

== Powers and duties ==
The presidency as well as its powers and duties are established by the Federal Constitutional Law, while additional powers may be rooted in statutory law, convention or precedent.

Every act of the president requires a request or/and a countersignature to become effective, unless the Constitution expressly says otherwise. While requests are made on a discretionary basis, countersignatures exist to confirm that the act has in fact been signed by the president and meets all constitutional prerequisites. The countersigning authority is also responsible for implementing the act, and assumes political responsibility for it.

Act	Requires a request	Requires countersignature
Executive
Appointing a chancellor	No	Chancellor
Removing the chancellor	No	No
Appointing a Cabinet	Chancellor	Chancellor
Dismissing the Cabinet	No	No
Appointing a minister or secretary of state	Chancellor	Chancellor
Removing a minister or secretary of state	Chancellor (unless when enforcing a verdict of the Constitutional Court)	Chancellor
Appointing federal officers	Competent Minister	Competent Minister
Issuing directives as commander-in-chief	Indistinct	Indistinct
Legislative
Issuing emergency decrees	Cabinet	Chancellor
Dissolving the National Council	Cabinet	Chancellor
Dissolving a State Legislature	Cabinet	Chancellor
Signing bills into law	Chancellor	Chancellor
Calling a constituent session of the National Council	Cabinet	Chancellor
Calling a session of the National Council	Cabinet	Chancellor
Calling an extraordinary session of the National Council (discretionary)	No	No
Calling an extraordinary session of the National Council (compulsory)	Cabinet, National Council or Federal Council	No
Adjourning sessions of the National Council	National Council	No
Ordering the administration of a plebiscite	Cabinet	Chancellor
Calling a session of the Federal Assembly	Cabinet	Chancellor
Judicial
Appointing justices of the Supreme Court of Justice and the Supreme Administrative Court	Cabinet	Chancellor
Appointing justices of the Constitutional Court	Cabinet, National Council and Federal Council	Chancellor
Enforcing verdicts of the Constitutional Court (federal level)	Constitutional Court	No
Enforcing verdicts of the Constitutional Court (state level)	Constitutional Court	Constitutional Court
Presidential Clemency	Minister of Justice	Minister of Justice
Diplomatic
Signing treaties	Cabinet	Chancellor
Empowering State Cabinets to make treaties with other countries	State Cabinet	Governor
Receiving foreign emissaries	Minister of Foreign Affairs	Minister of Foreign Affairs
Approving the appointment of consuls	Minister of Foreign Affairs	Minister of Foreign Affairs
Appointing consular representatives	Minister of Foreign Affairs	Minister of Foreign Affairs

=== Executive ===
==== Appointment of the Cabinet ====
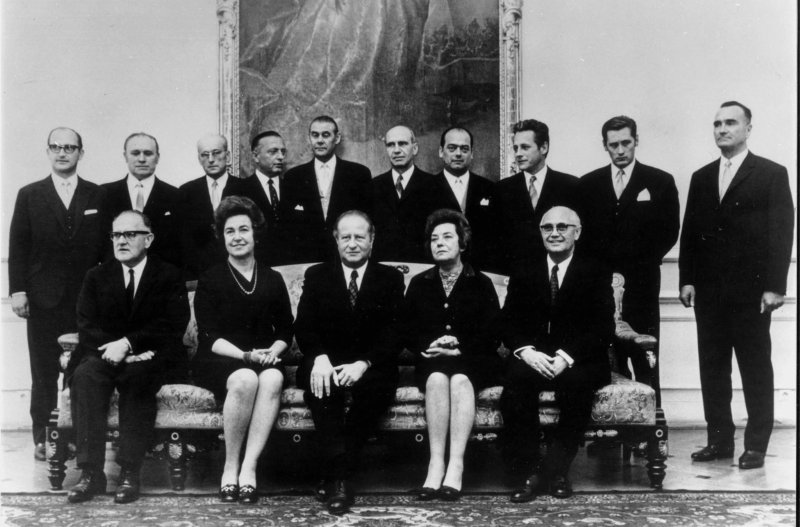
Cabinet Kreisky I, with Chancellor Bruno Kreisky seated at the center of the futon and President Rudolf Kirchschläger standing behind him (center-right)

The president appoints the chancellor, the vice chancellor, and the ministers, which collectively form the Cabinet of Austria.

A new National Council, the dominant lower chamber of Parliament, is elected at least every five years by universal suffrage. Following such an election, the president, according to political convention, charges the chancellor candidate (Note: Which is commonly party leader.) of the party that won the most seats with the formation of a new Cabinet. Theoretically, the president could appoint any adult citizen eligible to be elected to the National Council as chancellor. However, the National Council can adopt a motion of no confidence against the chancellor, a minister, or the entire Cabinet at any time, and the President is constitutionally required to dismiss any minister whom the National Council wants gone. In practice, this means the chancellor must be acceptable to the National Council and maintain its confidence.

If no party wins an absolute majority (the common electoral outcome since 1983), the leader of the largest party will search for a junior coalition partner to create a politically stable Cabinet that commands the support of the National Council. This process will kick off with a series of rather brief "exploratory discussions" (Sondierungsgespräche) with all parties, which usually lasts several weeks. During this time, the chancellor candidate will commonly seek out the party most willing to compromise. Once a potential partner is found, the winning party will subsequently enter more serious and comprehensive "coalition negotiations" (Koalitionsverhandlungen), a process usually lasting several months. The objective of the coalition negotiations is to produce a cabinet agenda (Regierungsprogramm), a coalition contract (Koalitionsvertrag) and a ministers' list (Ministerliste), which determines the Cabinet's composition. The leader of the junior partner usually receives the vice chancellorship and an additional ministry.

Following the end of the negotiations, the leader of the winning party submits the ministers' list to the president, who can either accept or reject it. If the president accepts, the new Cabinet will be appointed and officially sworn in at an inauguration ceremony. If the president rejects the list, there are several options; the president asks the chancellor candidate to rewrite the list or omit certain nominees, charges someone else with the formation of a cabinet or calls new elections.

There have only been three instances where a president refused to appoint a Cabinet nominee; Karl Renner denied to re-appoint a minister suspected of corruption, Theodor Körner dismissed the demand of Chancellor Leopold Figl to appoint a Cabinet that would have included the far-right Federation of Independents, and Thomas Klestil declined to appoint a nominee that has been indicted and a nominee who had made frequent extremist and xenophobic remarks.

==== Removal of the Cabinet ====
The president can remove the chancellor or the entire Cabinet such at will. However, individual Cabinet members can only be dismissed by the president on the request of the chancellor. So far, the dismissal of an entire Cabinet against its will has never occurred. President Wilhelm Miklas did not make use of this power when Chancellor Engelbert Dollfuß absolished the Constitution to establish the dictatorial Federal State of Austria.

The removal of a minister against their will occurred only once, when Chancellor Sebastian Kurz asked President Alexander Van der Bellen to remove Interior Minister Herbert Kickl. Ensuing the Ibiza affair and a likely collapse of the Cabinet, Kickl moved to appoint Peter Goldgruber – with whom he had close ties – to the office of director general for Public Security, which would have granted him direct control over Austrian law enforcement. (Note: Which is generally of professional and permanent nature) President Alexander Van der Bellen refused to assent Goldgruber's appointment – following a convention to avoid high-level appointments during transition periods – thus preventing him from taking office.

The president is the only person legally able to remove any Cabinet member (including the chancellor) from office. Even if a Cabinet member resigns or is ousted by a no confidence vote, the president must remove them.

==== Appointment of other officers ====
From a legal perspective, the president appoints all federal officers and not just the members of Cabinet. This includes all military officers and soldiers, all judges as well as all ordinary functionaries. However, this constitutional power has been statutorily or conventionally delegated to the ministers and their subordinates. Though the president retains the right to personally appoint the top brass of the federal apparatus.

Because the governors of the states do not only serve as the chief executives of their respective state government but also as the representatives of the national Cabinet within that state, the president swears in all governors, following their election by the State Legislature.

=== Legislative ===
==== Signing bills into law ====
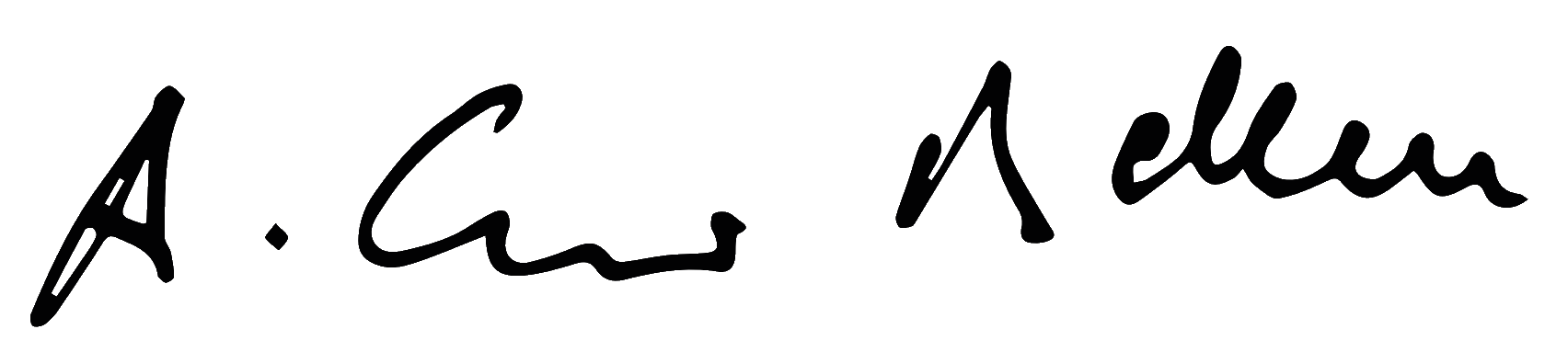
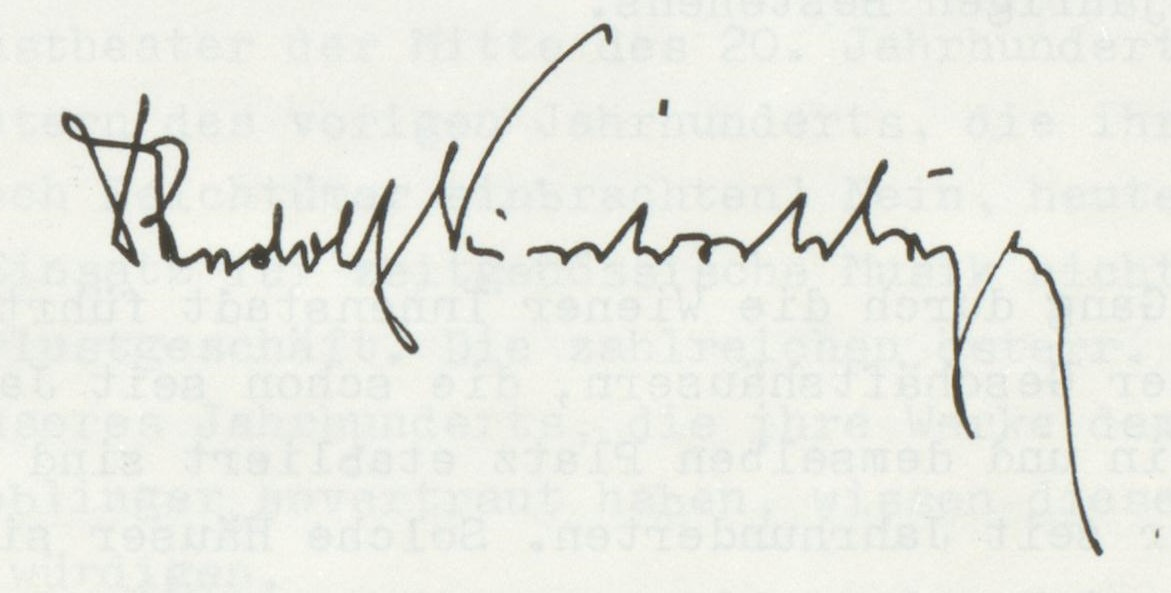
The signatures of four presidents

The president signs all bills into law. Signing bills into law is a duty and not a discretionary power of the president; it is not comparable with the presidential veto in the United States. When signing bills into law, it is the task of the president to check if a piece of legislation was enacted according to constitutional prerequisites. If that is not the case, the president must withhold their signature, which strikes down the bill. All federal bills, statutory and constitutional, must be signed by the president to become effective.

The president generally does not verify if an enacted statute complies with constitutional law; that falls within the purview of the Constitutional Court. Opinions regarding the extent of this responsibility have varied, with some arguing that the president may deny their signature if a statute is undoubtedly unconstitutional. President Heinz Fischer refused to sign a bill – containing criminal provisions with retrospective effect – into law; this remains the only time a president withheld their signature.

Once a bill is introduced in Parliament, it must pass the National Council and be approved by the Federal Council to become enacted. Following its enactment, the bill is given to the chancellor, who submits it to the president. After the president signs the bill into law, the chancellor countersigns and then promulgates the bill in the federal law gazette, rendering it effective.

==== Dissolution of the National Council ====
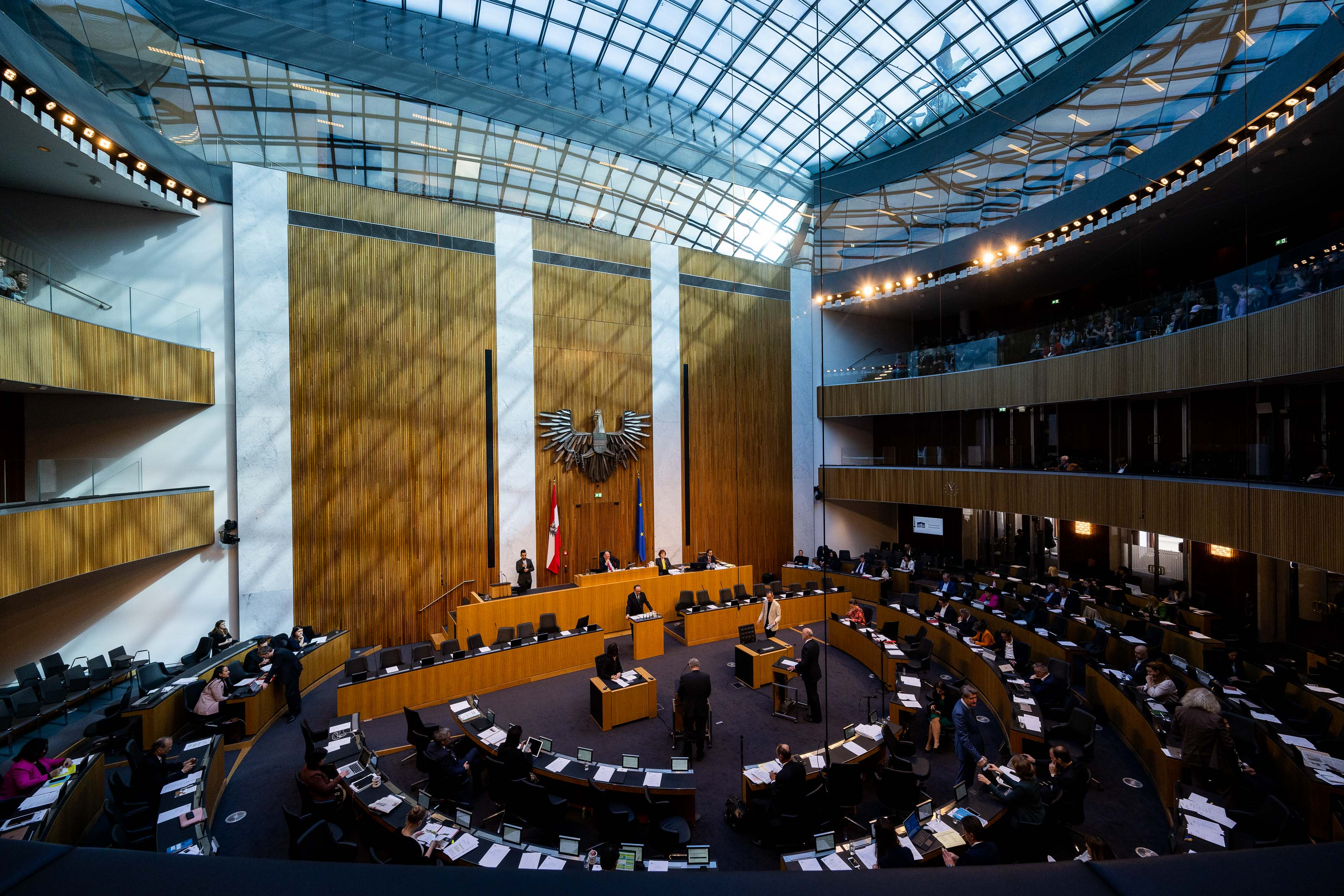
The renovated chamber of the National Council.

The president may dissolve the National Council at the request of Cabinet, but only once for the same reason. The consequences of a presidential dissolution of the National Council differ from those of a "self-dissolution". If the president terminates the legislative period, the National Council is considered immediately dissolved and thereby incapacitated. However, the Standing Subcommittee of the National Council's Principal Committee remains as an emergency body until the newly elected National Council convenes. In the case of self-dissolution, the old National Council keeps meeting until a new one is elected.

So far, only President Wilhelm Miklas has made use of this power, after the Christian Social Party had lost its coalition partner and thus the support of Parliament.

==== Dissolution of State Legislatures ====
The president can dissolve every State Legislature at the request of Cabinet and with the consent of the Federal Council. However, the president may only do so once for the same reason. The Federal Council must agree to the dissolution with a two-thirds supermajority. The delegation of the state whose legislature is to be dissolved, may not partake in the vote.

The dissolution of a State Legislature is viewed as an encroachment on federalism, as national authorities breach the autonomy and self-governance of the states. To date, this power has never been used.

==== Emergency decrees ====
The president is authorized to rule by emergency decree in times of crisis. The Constitution states as follow:

To ward off irreparable damages to the general public, at a time when the National Council is not in session and cannot be convened in time, at the request of the Cabinet, and with the assent of the Standing Subcommittee of the Principal Committee of the National Council, the president is empowered to adopt provisional regulations that have the force of law.

Emergency decrees cannot alter the Constitution or essential laws. As soon as the National Council is in session again, it must approve or invalidate active emergency decrees. The power to rule by decree has never been used.

==== Other legislative powers ====
The president may call and adjourn sessions of the National Council. If requested by the Cabinet or one-third of the members of the National Council or the Federal Council, the president must call a session of the National Council. The president can also call a session of the Federal Assembly. Lastly, the president can instruct the administration of a binding (Volksabstimmung) or non-binding (Volksbefragung) plebiscite.

=== Judicial ===
==== Enforcement of Constitutional Court findings ====
The president is entrusted with the enforcement of findings (decisions) of the Constitutional Court, if said enforcement does not fall within the purview of ordinary courts. The request for presidential enforcement is filed by the Court itself.

The Constitution provides the president with extensive powers when it comes to enforcing findings. As part of enforcements, the president may issue operational directives to any federal or state authorities.

==== Appointment of justices ====
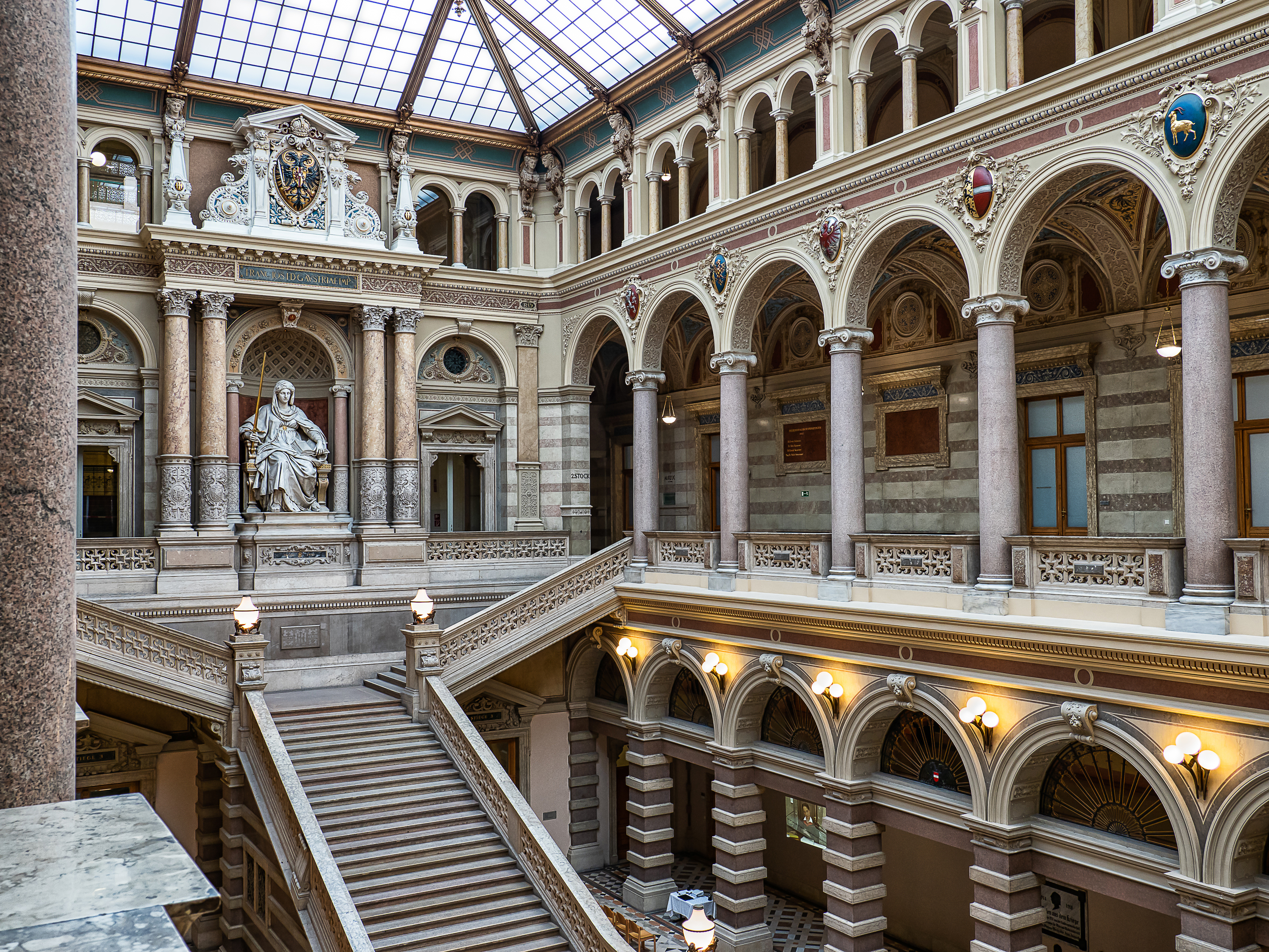
The Palace of Justice, seat of the Supreme Court of Justice.

The president appoints the president, the vice president, the six further justices, and the three substitute justices of the Constitutional Court on the recommendation of Cabinet; additionally, the president appoints three justices and two substitute justices on the recommendation of the National Council and three justices and one substitute justice on the recommendation of the Federal Council.

The president also appoints all justices of the Supreme Court of Justice and the Supreme Administrative Court on the recommendation of the Cabinet. Thought the Cabinet may only chose from a pool of justices nominated by the Courts themselves.

==== Presidential Clemency ====
The president has the power of clemency, which includes pardons, sentence changes and commutations. According to the Constitutional Court, presidential pardons do not only void the sentence but also undo the conviction itself. The president also has the power to delete criminal record entries or limit who can access the criminal record of a person.

Convicts desiring clemency must file a request with the Ministry of Justice. The minister then personally approves or denies the request. If the request is approved, it is submitted to the president. The president usually accepts the minister's decision. Though the president can always deny clemency, the president cannot grant clemency without a request from the minister of justice.

=== Diplomatic ===
The president is the chief diplomat of Austria and may negotiate and sign treaties with other countries, receive foreign emissaries, approve the appointment of consuls and personally appoint consular representatives. Treaties that change or supplement existing law must be approved by the National Council.

When Austria joined the European Union, President Thomas Klestil and Chancellor Franz Vranitzky had a disagreement on who would represent Austria in the European Council. Ultimately, the chancellor prevailed, though Klestil argued that he had only delegated his power of representation to the chancellor.

=== Military ===
The president is the commander-in-chief (Oberbefehlshaber) of the Austrian Armed Forces. This is perhaps the single most vague of any presidential powers; the extent of the president's authority as commander-in-chief is largely subject to interpretation.

Although the president outranks the minister of defence and all military personnel in their capacity as commander-in-chief, presidential military authority is not expressly excluded from requiring countersignature or requests by the Constitution, meaning that this power can only be used in cooperation with the Cabinet.

Since no president has ever made use of this power, precedents were never established. Day-to-day military operations are administered by the minister of defense, who is referred to as commander (Befehlshaber) of the Armed Forces by the Constitution. Defense policy and key decisions on the use of the military are usually made by the Cabinet as a whole.

Following the collapse of the Habsburg monarchy, the Emperor of Austria, in his capacity as head of the Austro-Hungarian military, was succeeded by the Principal Committee of the newly established National Council, which began serving as the main decision-making body of the Armed Forces. In 1929, the Christian Social Party transferred supreme military authority from the Principal Committee to the president.

The president also grants commissions to officers but not in their capacity as commander-in-chief.

=== Ceremonial ===
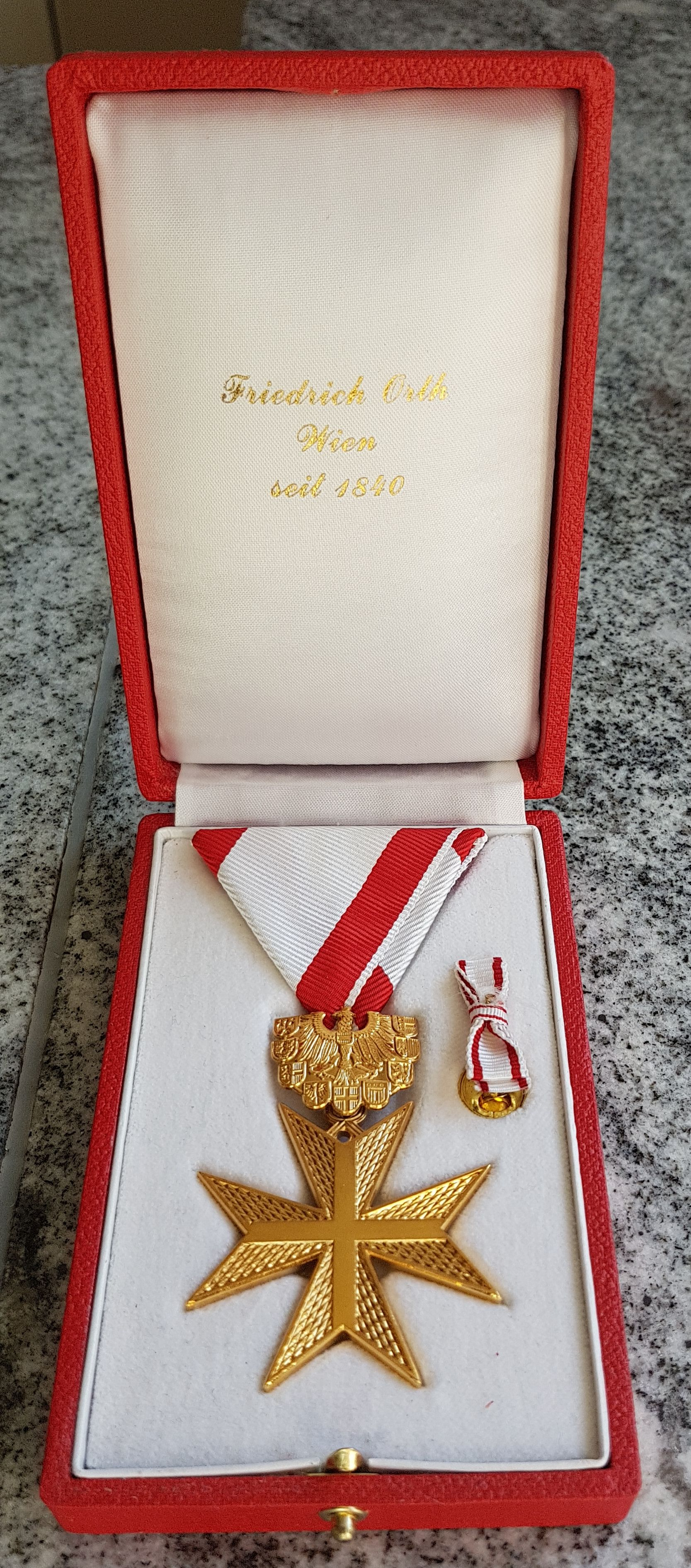
The Golden Badge of Merit, one of the Decorations of Honour.

The president has various additional powers and duties, which are typically vested in a head of state. These include, for example, the creation and conferment of honorary and professional titles, and the purely symbolic right to legitimise illegitimate children at the request of their parents.

The president also confers the Decorations of Honour for Services to the Republic of Austria, the most prestigious state decoration Austria has to offer. It is conferred for extraordinary achievements, especially in the areas of politics, science and culture, at the request of the Cabinet. The decorations consist of 15 classes, starting with the bronze medal and ending with the Grand Cross. The president automatically receives the Grand Cross upon assuming office.

Another power is the bestowal of the Promotio sub auspiciis Praesidentis rei publicae, a golden ring serving as the highest possible distinction and decoration for doctoral students.

== Incumbency ==
=== Immunity ===
The president generally enjoys immunity from any type of criminal procedures. The president may only be prosecuted with the explicit consent of the Federal Assembly. If a government authority intends to prosecute the president, it must file a request for prosecution with the National Council. If the National Council deems the request legitimate, the Federal Assembly is convened.

The Constitution does not establish that a criminal conviction of the president by ordinary courts, automatically leads to a removal from office. However, a prison sentence would most certainly incapacitate the president, which would lead to a loss of all presidential authority.

=== Accountability ===
==== Political ====
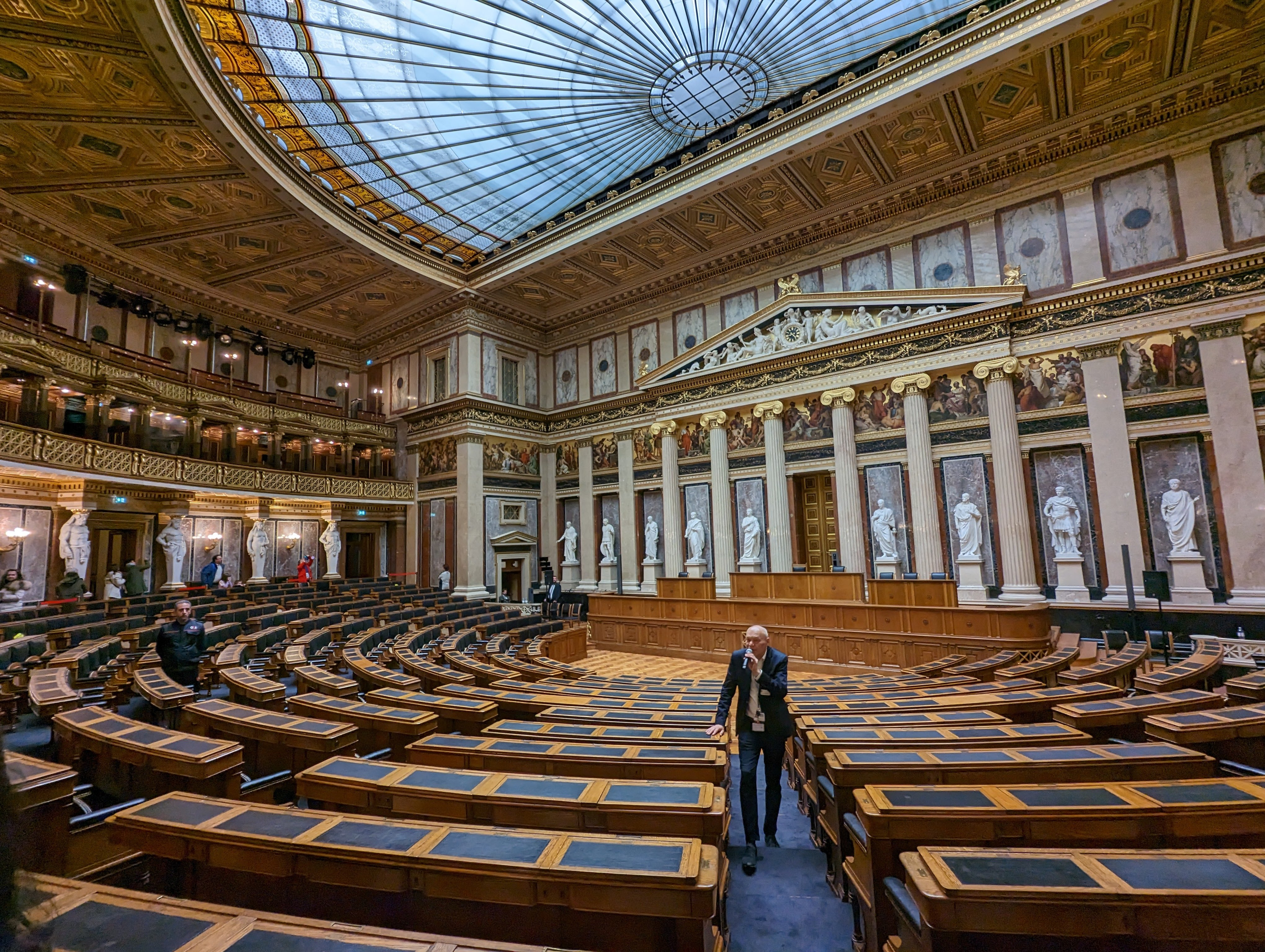
The Federal Assembly chamber in the Austrian Parliament Building.

The "ordinary" way of removing a sitting president from office would be through a plebiscite. Since the president is elected by the people, the president can also be removed by the people.

This process starts with a resolution of the National Council calling for a convocation of the Federal Assembly to consider the removal of the president. Such a resolution requires a supermajority (two-thirds support) and the attendance of at least half of all members of the National Council. If such a resolution is enacted, the president is automatically incapacitated and hence unable to "further exercise the powers and duties of the presidency". Once the Federal Assembly is convened, it decides if a plebiscite should be administered or not.

If the plebiscite favors a removal from office, the president is removed from office. If the plebiscite opposes a removal, a new legislative election is triggered and the National Council is automatically dissolved.

==== Legal ====
The president can be impeached before the Constitutional Court by the Federal Assembly for violating constitutional law.

This process is triggered by either a resolution of the National Council or the Federal Council. If the resolution is successful, the Federal Assembly must convene. The Federal Assembly then contemplates impeaching the president. A supermajority and the attendance of at least half of all members of the National Council and the Federal Council is required to trigger the impeachment process.

If the Federal Assembly votes to impeach, it acts as plaintiff before the Constitutional Court. If the Court convicts the president for having violated the Constitution, the president is removed from office. If the president is found guilty of having committed only a minor offense, the president remains in office and is merely reprimanded.

=== Succession ===
The Constitution makes no provisions for an office of vice president. Should the president become temporarily incapacitated – undergoes surgery, becomes severely ill or visits a foreign country (excluding EU member states) – presidential powers and duties devolve upon the chancellor for a period of twenty days, although the chancellor does not receive a title like "acting president" during that time.

The powers and duties of the presidency devolve upon the Presidium of the National Council in the following three cases:

- The aforementioned period of twenty days expires, in which case the Presidium assumes presidential authority on the twenty-first day;
- The office is vacated because the president dies in office, resigns or is removed from office, in which case the Presidium assumes presidential authority immediately;
- The president is unable to "further exercise the powers and duties of the presidency" because the National Council has convened the Federal Assembly to consider removing the president from office via plebiscite, in which case the Presidium also immediately assumes presidential authority.

When exercising the powers and duties of the presidency, the three presidents of the National Council – forming the Presidium – act collectively as one body. If votes are divided equally, the higher-ranking president has the power to break ties.

=== Compensation ===
The president is compensated for their public service with €349,398 annually, the chancellor in turn is compensated with €311,962 annually. This amount is particularly high when considering that the chancellor of Germany (€251,448), the president of France (€179,000), the prime minister of the United Kingdom (€169,284), the president of Russia (€125,973) and the president of China (€19,275) receive a significantly lower salary, though they are chief executives of substantially larger countries.

=== Workplace ===
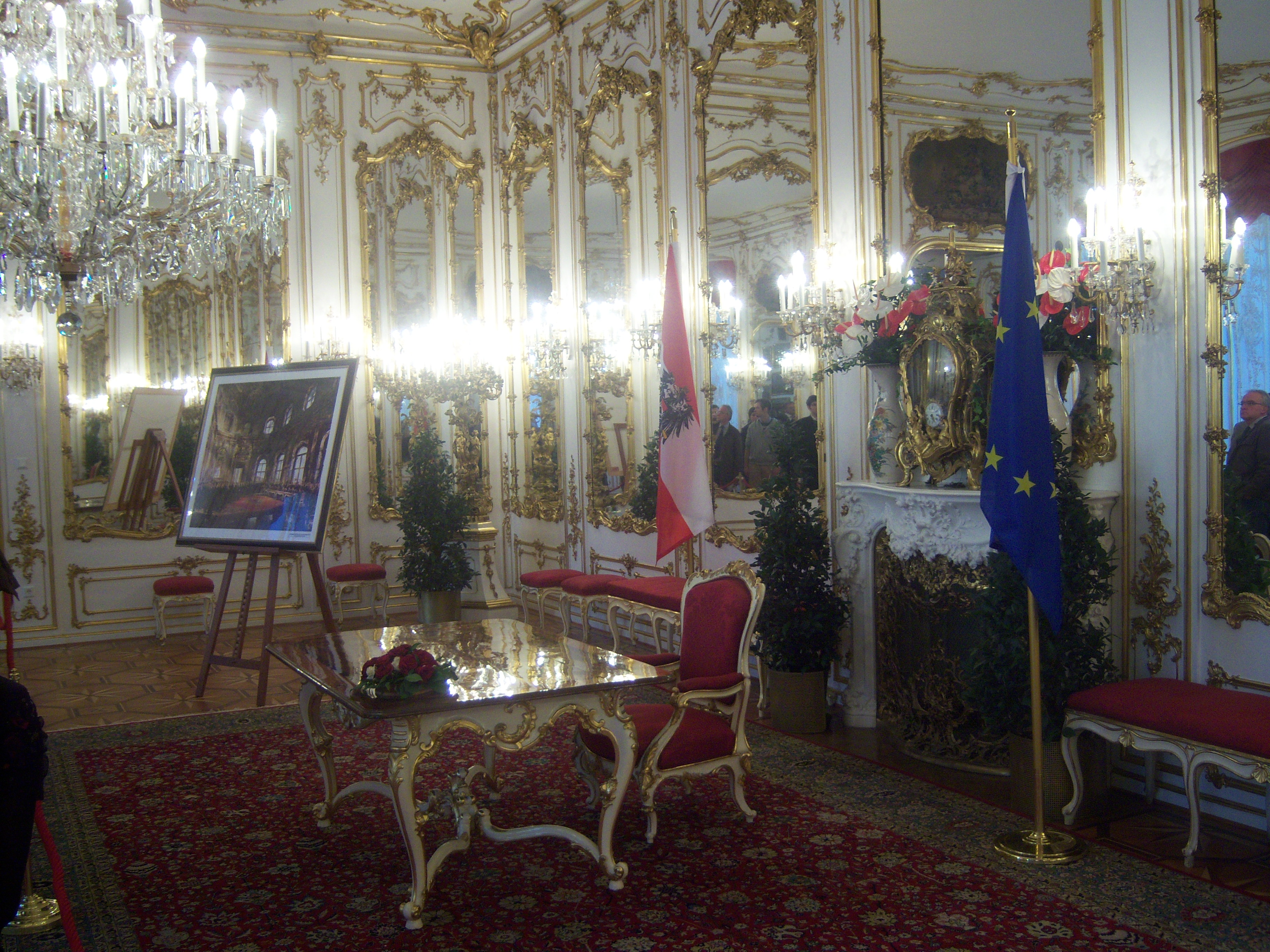
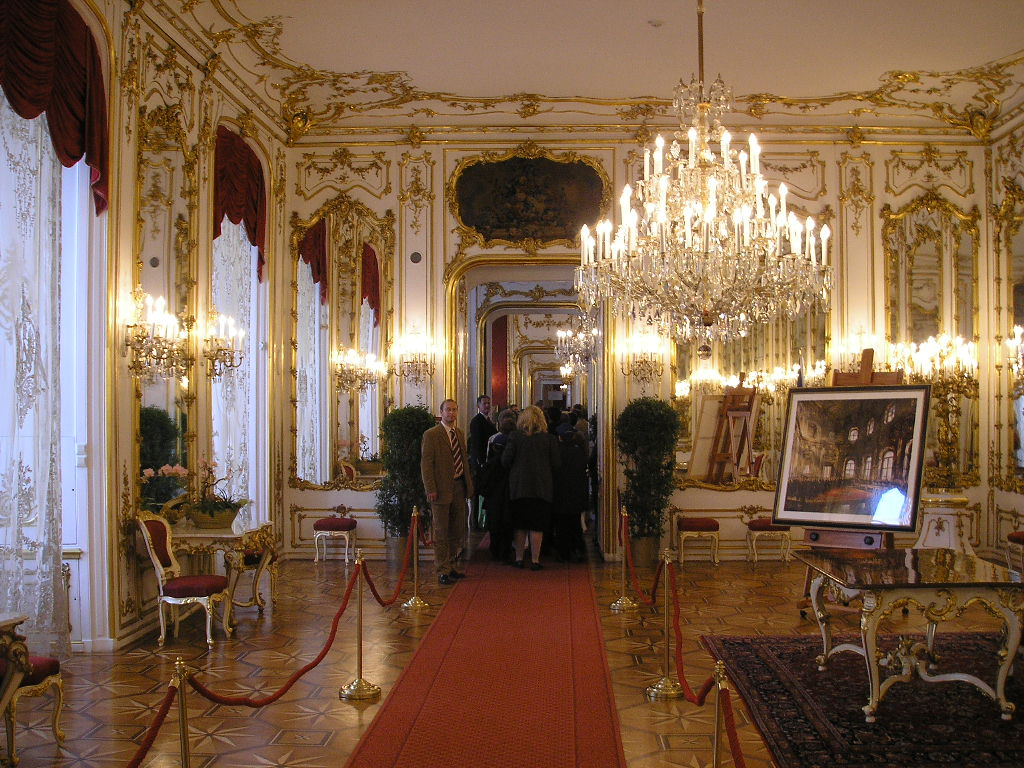
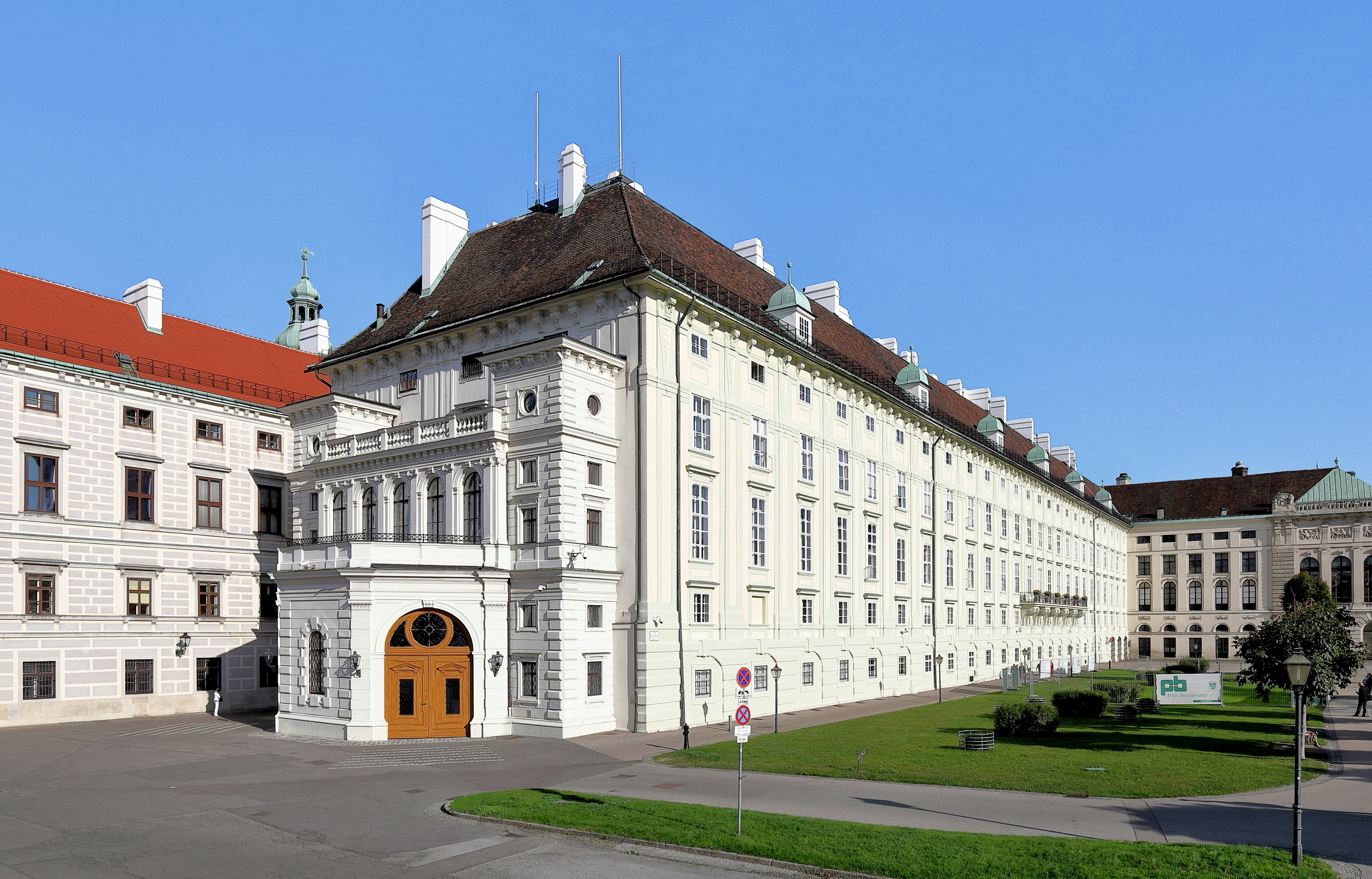
The mirror room (left), the central hallway (right), and the facade (below) of the Leopoldine Wing.

The principal residence and workplace of the president is situated in the Leopoldine Wing in the Hofburg Imperial Palace, which is located in the Innere Stadt of Vienna. The Leopoldine Wing is sometimes ambiguously referred to as the "Presidential Chancellery", the Office of the President. In reality however, the president does not actually reside in the Hofburg but retains their personal home.

As its name already divulges, the Hofburg is an edifice stemming from the imperial era; it was built under Holy Roman Emperor Leopold I in the 13th century. Ensuing the fall of the monarchy and the formation of the republic, democratic institutions intentionally kept their space from monarchic establishments. Hence, the original workplace of the president was actually the chancellery building. Following severe allied bombardments during World War II, the chancellery building sustained heavy damage and consequently became uninhabitable. Thus, the president had to find a new workplace. The first president of the Second Republic, Karl Renner, deliberately chose the Leopoldine Wing, as its creation and history (in particular the interior design) was largely influenced by Holy Roman Empress Maria Theresia, who had a popular public image at the time. The chancellery building was later rebuilt, renovated and renamed and now serves as the workplace of the chancellor.

Nowadays, the Leopoldine Wing harbours the offices of the Presidential Chancellery on its second and third floor. Next to the Hofburg, the president maintains a summer residence in Styria known as Mürzsteg Hunting Lodge. Although former President Heinz Fischer pledged to sell the building while campaigning for the presidency, the lodge has been used by him and his successor to host guests and foreign dignitaries.

=== Protection ===
The sitting president is legally protected by multiple criminal law provisions. The most notable one is § 249 of the Criminal Code:

Anyone who attempts to depose the president by force or extortion or use one of these means to coerce or prevent the exercise of presidential authority, shall be imprisoned for up to ten years.

The presidential title "Bundespräsident" is constitutionally protected and cannot be used by anyone else, even if combined with other words.

== Office of the President ==
The Office of the President (Präsidentschaftskanzlei) is an executive agency serving under the direct authority of the president. It advises the president on the exercise of presidential powers and duties, enables communication between the president and politicians, diplomats and citizens, and manages all other day-to-day administrative operations associated with the presidency. The agency is made up of various clerks, political advisers, legal counsellors, spokespeople as well as the presidential adjutant, an army officer formally charged with the protection of the president. The Office of the President is seated in the Leopoldine Wing of the Hofburg Imperial Palace.

== See also ==
- History of Austria
- Politics of Austria
- Chancellor of Austria
- List of chancellors of Austria
- Vice-Chancellor of Austria
- Emperor of Austria
