= Leopoldine Wing =

Wing of the Hofburg Palace in Austria

- Leopoldinischer Trakt
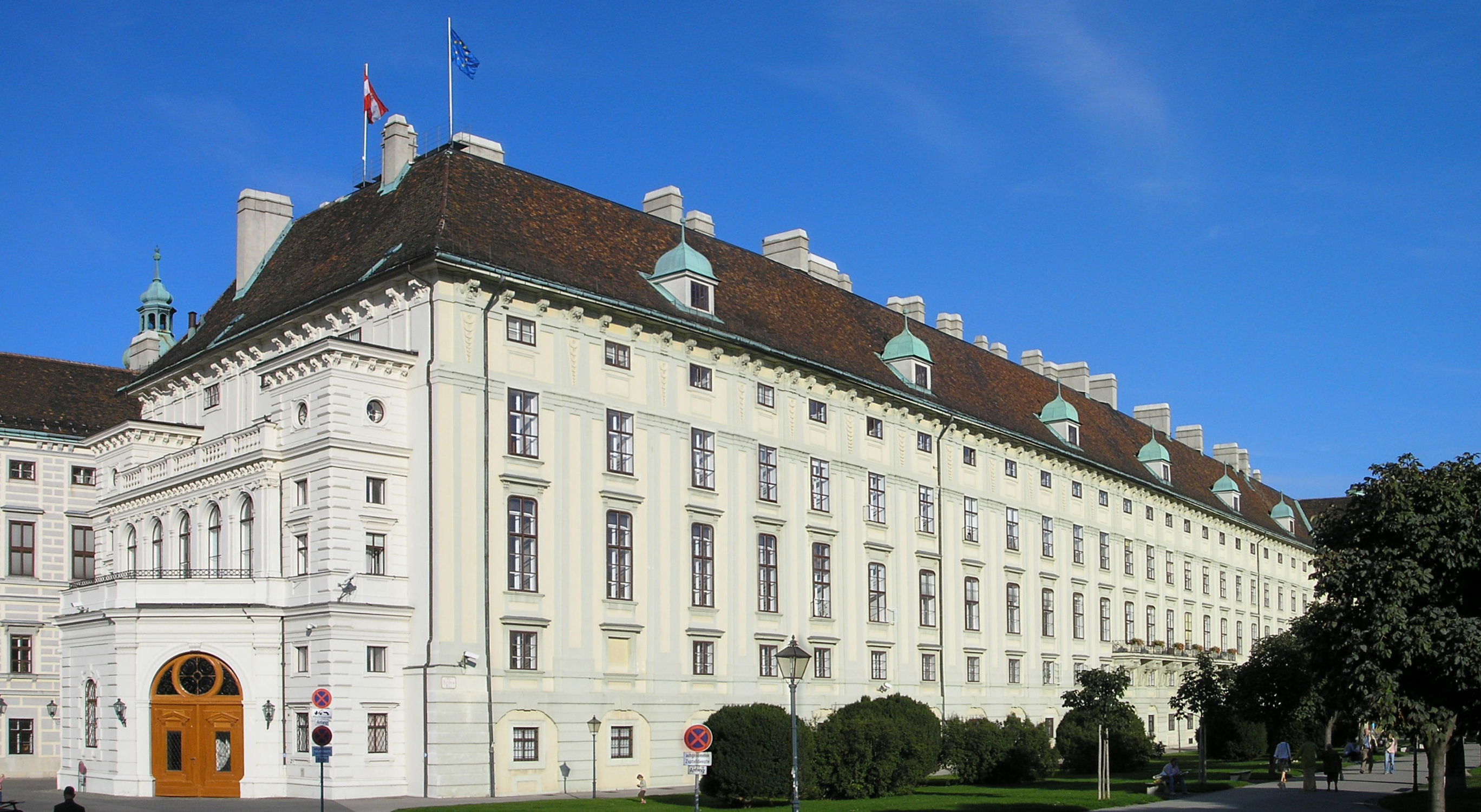

General information
- Type: Palace wing
- Architectural style: Early Baroque
- Location: Austria Hofburg Palace, Vienna, Austria
- Completed: 1667
- Client: Emperor Leopold I

The Leopoldine Wing is a wing of the Hofburg Palace in Vienna, Austria, connecting the Amalienburg with the Swiss Wing. It is considered the most historically and politically significant part of the palace complex, and has housed the offices of the Austrian Federal President since 1946. It was occupied by Maria Theresa as her primary residence and seat of government during the 18th century.

== History ==
=== Construction under Leopold I ===
The wing was commissioned by Emperor Leopold I and built between 1660 and 1667 to connect the Swiss Wing with the Amalienburg. The architect was Filiberto Lucchese and construction was carried out by Italian master builders Carl Martin Carlone and Domenico Carlone. The stonework was supplied by masters from Kaisersteinbruch, including Ambrosius Ferrethi and Camillo Rezi, who provided the hard Kaiserstein stone used for the facade, the large cornice slabs, the staircase and the portal. The wing burned down shortly after completion and was not restored until after the Second Turkish siege of Vienna in 1683.

=== Reconstruction and expansion ===
Following the 1683 siege, the wing was rebuilt by Giovanni Pietro Tencalla and an additional floor was added, giving it its current early Baroque appearance. In 1752, stonemasons Elias Hugel and Johann Baptist Regondi added a balcony. At the western end of the Leopoldine Wing stands the Court Chapel, which was completely renovated by Maria Theresa in 1772.

Maria Theresa chose the wing as her primary residence and the seat of her government, and her son Joseph II continued to use it. The wing contained the most splendid interiors of the imperial court in Vienna, including valuable furniture and artworks from the Maria Theresian Rococo, Neoclassical and Historicist periods.

On 28 June 1900, Archduke Franz Ferdinand, then heir to the throne and nephew of Emperor Franz Joseph I, made his declaration of renunciation in this wing, giving up the rights of succession for his future morganatic wife and their descendants.

=== Republic of Austria ===
From 1923 until its dissolution in 1939, the German Club, a nationalist organization with national-socialist leanings, held its meetings in eight state rooms of the Leopoldine Wing. Its membership included Federal President Michael Hainisch (1920 to 1928) and at least fifteen government ministers of the interwar period.

During World War II the wing was severely damaged by bombing. Following the war, since the rooms previously housing the Federal Presidency at the Federal Chancellery had been destroyed, the Leopoldine Wing was designated as the new seat of the office. Since October 1946, it has housed the offices of the Federal President of Austria and the Presidential Chancellery, marking the first time since the end of the monarchy in 1918 that the Hofburg had returned to being a centre of Austrian political life. The offices of the Federal President's staff are spread across all three floors of the wing. Some rooms are also used for official functions and events, though the wing is generally not accessible to the public.

== Architecture ==
The Leopoldine Wing is one of the largest and oldest parts of the Hofburg complex. Its early Baroque facade dates from 1660 to 1667 and was restored in cooperation with the Federal Monuments Office, which chose a two-tone coloring to ensure the extensively structured facades would not appear too dominant while preserving the atmosphere of the building's long history.

The wing also contained an enormous wine cellar beneath it and the Amalienburg. The "Secret Council Chamber" was also located in this wing, where Emperor Franz Joseph I delivered his inaugural speeches at meetings of the Austro-Hungarian delegation.

== See also ==
- Hofburg Palace
- Amalienburg
- Hofburg
- President of Austria
