= Supreme Courts of Austria =

Supreme Courts of Austria may refer to:

- Constitutional Court (Austria), tribunal responsible for the judicial review of legal matters relating to the Constitution
- Supreme Court of Justice (Austria), court of last resort for criminal and civil lawsuits other than administrative
- Supreme Administrative Court (Austria), court of last resort for administrative lawsuits

== See also ==
- Judiciary of Austria
- Supreme court
