= Presidential Chancellery =

- Präsidentschaftskanzlei
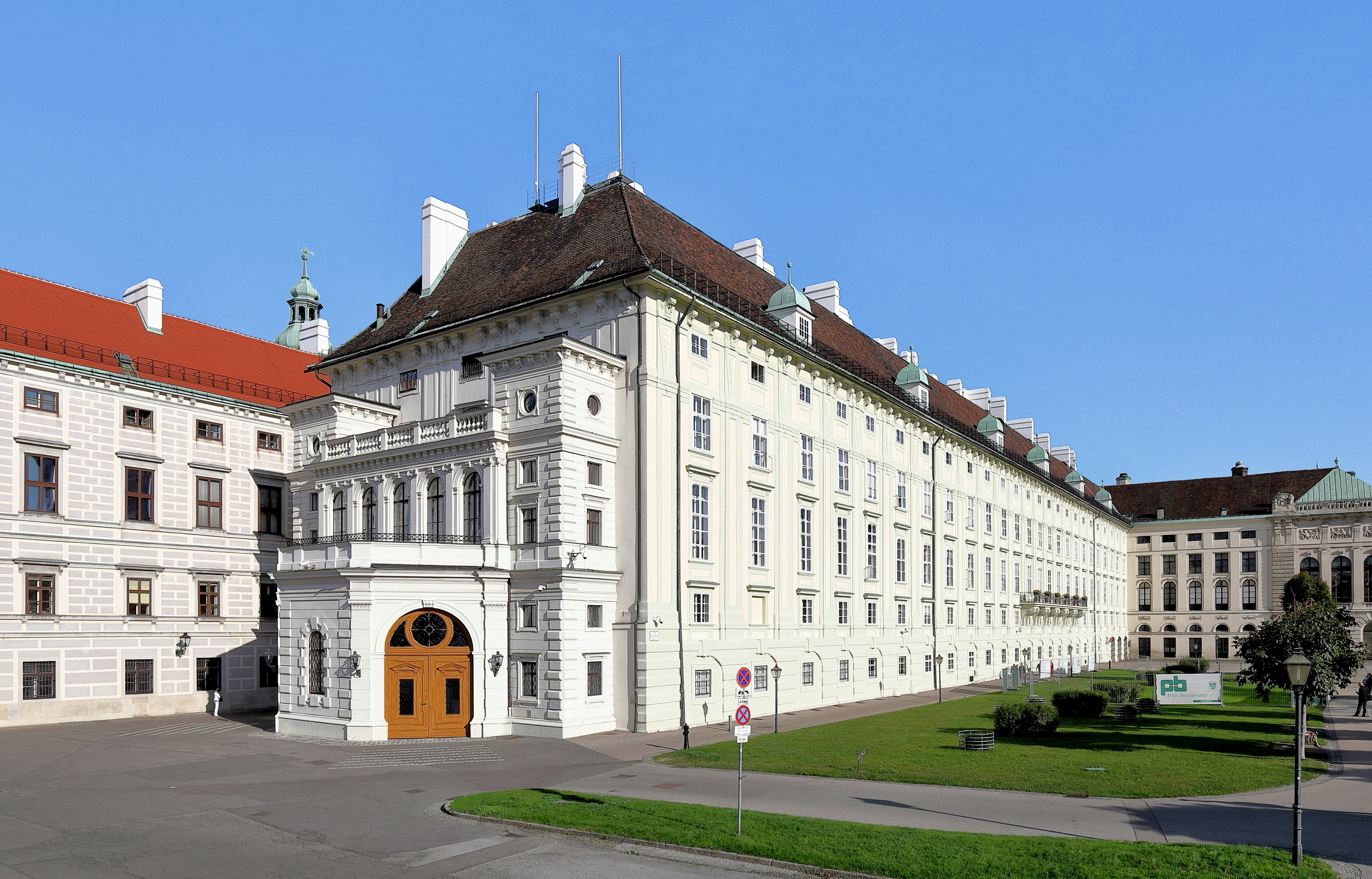

Agency overview
- Formed: October 1946
- Type: Advisory body
- Headquarters: Leopoldine Wing, Hofburg, Innere Stadt, Vienna
- Agency executives: Andrea Mayer, cabinet director; Heinz Hafner, cabinet vice director
- Parent: President of Austria
- Website: www.bundespraesident.at

The Presidential Chancellery (German: Präsidentschaftskanzlei) of Austria is an institution that assists the President with fulfilling his tasks as head of state. It is headquartered in the Leopoldine Wing of the Hofburg. The Chancellery is divided into several groups: group European and international affairs, protocol and organisation, group legal, social and administrative affairs and the group domestic affairs and adjutant's office of the President.
