= Sabine Haag =

Austrian art historian (born 1962)

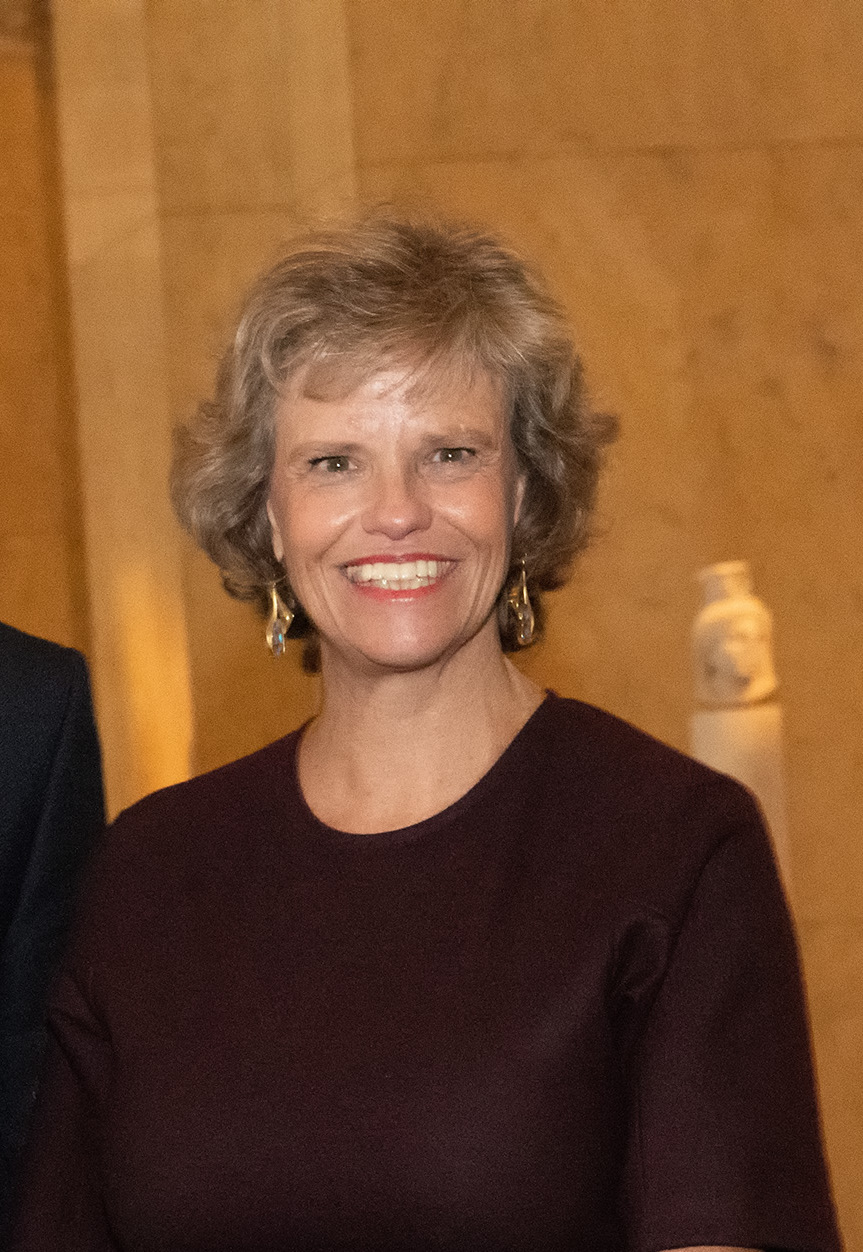

Sabine Haag (born 28 February 1962 in Bregenz) is an Austrian art historian, who has served as the director general of the Kunsthistorisches Museum since 2009. She specialises in art made from amber and ivory.
