= Innsbruck (National Council electoral district) =

Parliamentary electoral district in Austria

- Electoral District for the National Council
- Location of Innsbruck within Austria
- City: Innsbruck
- State: Tyrol
- Population: 132,188 (2024)
- Electorate: 86,625 (2019)
- Area: 105 km^{2} (2023)

Current Electoral District
- Created: 1994
- Seats: List: 2 (2013–present); 3 (1994–2013)

Innsbruck, also known as Electoral District 7A (German: Wahlkreis 7A), is one of the 39 multi-member regional electoral districts of the National Council, the lower house of the Austrian Parliament, the national legislature of Austria. The electoral district was created in 1992 when electoral regulations were amended to add regional electoral districts to the existing state-wide electoral districts and came into being at the following legislative election in 1994. It is conterminous with the city of Innsbruck in the state of Tyrol. The electoral district currently elects two of the 183 members of the National Council using the open party-list proportional representation electoral system. At the 2019 legislative election the constituency had 86,625 registered electors.

== History ==
Innsbruck was one 43 regional electoral districts (regionalwahlkreise) established by the "National Council Electoral Regulations 1992" (Nationalrats-Wahlordnung 1992) passed by the National Council in 1992. It was conterminous with the city of Innsbruck in the state of Tyrol. The district was initially allocated three seats in May 1993. Electoral regulations require the allocation of seats amongst the electoral districts to be recalculated following each national census and in June 2013 the number of seats allocated to Innsbruck was reduced to two based on the population as at the 2011 national census.

== Electoral system ==
Innsbruck currently elects two of the 183 members of the National Council using the open party-list proportional representation electoral system. The allocation of seats is carried out in three stages. In the first stage, seats are allocated to parties (lists) at the regional level using a state-wide Hare quota (wahlzahl) (valid votes in the state divided by the number of seats in the state). In the second stage, seats are allocated to parties at the state/provincial level using the state-wide Hare quota (any seats won by the party at the regional stage are subtracted from the party's state seats). In the third and final stage, seats are allocated to parties at the federal/national level using the D'Hondt method (any seats won by the party at the regional and state stages are subtracted from the party's federal seats). Only parties that reach the 4% national threshold, or have won a seat at the regional stage, compete for seats at the state and federal stages.

Electors may cast one preferential vote for individual candidates at the regional, state and federal levels. Split-ticket voting (panachage), or voting for more than one candidate at each level, is not permitted and will result in the ballot paper being invalidated. At the regional level, candidates must receive preferential votes amounting to at least 14% of the valid votes cast for their party to over-ride the order of the party list (10% and 7% respectively for the state and federal levels). Prior to April 2013 electors could not cast preferential votes at the federal level and the thresholds candidates needed to over-ride the party list order were higher at the regional level (half the Hare quota or 1/6 of the party votes) and state level (Hare quota).

== Election results ==
=== Summary ===
Election	Communists KPÖ+ / KPÖ			Social Democrats SPÖ			Greens GRÜNE			NEOS NEOS / LiF			People's ÖVP			Freedom FPÖ		
Election	Votes	%	Seats	Votes	%	Seats	Votes	%	Seats	Votes	%	Seats	Votes	%	Seats	Votes	%	Seats
2019	693	1.13%	0	10,357	16.90%	0	15,387	25.11%	0	6,878	11.22%	0	17,590	28.70%	0	8,188	13.36%	0
2017	824	1.23%	0	18,986	28.31%	0	5,366	8.00%	0	5,112	7.62%	0	17,887	26.68%	0	13,955	20.81%	0
2013	785	1.36%	0	11,456	19.82%	0	14,015	24.24%	0	4,527	7.83%	0	12,238	21.17%	0	10,367	17.93%	0
2008	466	0.77%	0	12,026	19.84%	0	11,561	19.07%	0	2,672	4.41%	0	13,066	21.55%	0	10,499	17.32%	0
2006	647	1.09%	0	15,450	25.95%	0	13,327	22.39%	0				18,178	30.54%	0	7,284	12.24%	0
2002	464	0.71%	0	18,718	28.56%	0	13,041	19.90%	0	1,309	2.00%	0	25,780	39.34%	0	6,218	9.49%	0
1999	309	0.51%	0	15,400	25.49%	0	8,960	14.83%	0	3,970	6.57%	0	13,607	22.52%	0	16,642	27.54%	0
1995	253	0.38%	0	21,531	31.94%	0	5,678	8.42%	0	6,168	9.15%	0	15,669	23.24%	0	17,085	25.34%	0
1994	198	0.32%	0	16,882	27.02%	0	8,309	13.30%	0	5,299	8.48%	0	15,337	24.55%	0	14,961	23.95%	0

=== Detailed ===
==== 2010s ====
===== 2019 =====
Results of the 2019 legislative election held on 29 September 2019:

Party		Votes	%	Seats
Austrian People's Party	ÖVP	17,590	28.70%	0
The Greens – The Green Alternative	GRÜNE	15,387	25.11%	0
Social Democratic Party of Austria	SPÖ	10,357	16.90%	0
Freedom Party of Austria	FPÖ	8,188	13.36%	0
NEOS – The New Austria and Liberal Forum	NEOS	6,878	11.22%	0
JETZT	JETZT	1,706	2.78%	0
KPÖ Plus	KPÖ+	693	1.13%	0
Der Wandel	WANDL	346	0.56%	0
My Vote Counts!	GILT	144	0.23%	0
Valid Votes		61,289	100.00%	0
Rejected Votes		434	0.70%	
Total Polled		61,723	71.25%	
Registered Electors		86,625		

===== 2017 =====
Results of the 2017 legislative election held on 15 October 2017:

Party		Votes	%	Seats
Social Democratic Party of Austria	SPÖ	18,986	28.31%	0
Austrian People's Party	ÖVP	17,887	26.68%	0
Freedom Party of Austria	FPÖ	13,955	20.81%	0
The Greens – The Green Alternative	GRÜNE	5,366	8.00%	0
NEOS – The New Austria and Liberal Forum	NEOS	5,112	7.62%	0
Peter Pilz List	PILZ	4,057	6.05%	0
Communist Party of Austria	KPÖ	824	1.23%	0
My Vote Counts!	GILT	599	0.89%	0
The Whites	WEIßE	142	0.21%	0
Free List Austria	FLÖ	125	0.19%	0
Valid Votes		67,053	100.00%	0
Rejected Votes		563	0.83%	
Total Polled		67,616	76.18%	
Registered Electors		88,754		

===== 2013 =====
Results of the 2013 legislative election held on 29 September 2013:

Party		Votes	%	Seats
The Greens – The Green Alternative	GRÜNE	14,015	24.24%	0
Austrian People's Party	ÖVP	12,238	21.17%	0
Social Democratic Party of Austria	SPÖ	11,456	19.82%	0
Freedom Party of Austria	FPÖ	10,367	17.93%	0
NEOS – The New Austria	NEOS	4,527	7.83%	0
Team Stronach	FRANK	2,590	4.48%	0
Alliance for the Future of Austria	BZÖ	1,310	2.27%	0
Communist Party of Austria	KPÖ	785	1.36%	0
Pirate Party of Austria	PIRAT	522	0.90%	0
Valid Votes		57,810	100.00%	0
Rejected Votes		746	1.27%	
Total Polled		58,556	65.97%	
Registered Electors		88,762		

==== 2000s ====
===== 2008 =====
Results of the 2008 legislative election held on 28 September 2008:

Party		Votes	%	Seats
Austrian People's Party	ÖVP	13,066	21.55%	0
Social Democratic Party of Austria	SPÖ	12,026	19.84%	0
The Greens – The Green Alternative	GRÜNE	11,561	19.07%	0
Freedom Party of Austria	FPÖ	10,499	17.32%	0
Fritz Dinkhauser List – Citizens' Forum Tyrol	FRITZ	5,207	8.59%	0
Alliance for the Future of Austria	BZÖ	4,307	7.10%	0
Liberal Forum	LiF	2,672	4.41%	0
Communist Party of Austria	KPÖ	466	0.77%	0
The Christians	DC	385	0.64%	0
Independent Citizens' Initiative Save Austria	RETTÖ	334	0.55%	0
Left	LINKE	104	0.17%	0
Valid Votes		60,627	100.00%	0
Rejected Votes		707	1.15%	
Total Polled		61,334	69.83%	
Registered Electors		87,834		

===== 2006 =====
Results of the 2006 legislative election held on 1 October 2006:

Party		Votes	%	Seats
Austrian People's Party	ÖVP	18,178	30.54%	0
Social Democratic Party of Austria	SPÖ	15,450	25.95%	0
The Greens – The Green Alternative	GRÜNE	13,327	22.39%	0
Freedom Party of Austria	FPÖ	7,284	12.24%	0
Hans-Peter Martin's List	MATIN	2,101	3.53%	0
Alliance for the Future of Austria	BZÖ	1,881	3.16%	0
EU Withdrawal – Neutral Free Austria	NFÖ	662	1.11%	0
Communist Party of Austria	KPÖ	647	1.09%	0
Valid Votes		59,530	100.00%	0
Rejected Votes		624	1.04%	
Total Polled		60,154	70.22%	
Registered Electors		85,670		

===== 2002 =====
Results of the 2002 legislative election held on 24 November 2002:

Party		Votes	%	Seats
Austrian People's Party	ÖVP	25,780	39.34%	0
Social Democratic Party of Austria	SPÖ	18,718	28.56%	0
The Greens – The Green Alternative	GRÜNE	13,041	19.90%	0
Freedom Party of Austria	FPÖ	6,218	9.49%	0
Liberal Forum	LiF	1,309	2.00%	0
Communist Party of Austria	KPÖ	464	0.71%	0
Valid Votes		65,530	100.00%	0
Rejected Votes		765	1.15%	
Total Polled		66,295	79.57%	
Registered Electors		83,320		

==== 1990s ====
===== 1999 =====
Results of the 1999 legislative election held on 3 October 1999:

Party		Votes	%	Seats
Freedom Party of Austria	FPÖ	16,642	27.54%	0
Social Democratic Party of Austria	SPÖ	15,400	25.49%	0
Austrian People's Party	ÖVP	13,607	22.52%	0
The Greens – The Green Alternative	GRÜNE	8,960	14.83%	0
Liberal Forum	LiF	3,970	6.57%	0
The Independents	DU	1,002	1.66%	0
Communist Party of Austria	KPÖ	309	0.51%	0
No to NATO and EU – Neutral Austria Citizens' Initiative	NEIN	271	0.45%	0
Christian Voters Community	CWG	263	0.44%	0
Valid Votes		60,424	100.00%	0
Rejected Votes		971	1.58%	
Total Polled		61,395	75.04%	
Registered Electors		81,813		

===== 1995 =====
Results of the 1995 legislative election held on 17 December 1995:

Party		Votes	%	Seats
Social Democratic Party of Austria	SPÖ	21,531	31.94%	0
Freedom Party of Austria	FPÖ	17,085	25.34%	0
Austrian People's Party	ÖVP	15,669	23.24%	0
Liberal Forum	LiF	6,168	9.15%	0
The Greens – The Green Alternative	GRÜNE	5,678	8.42%	0
No – Civic Action Group; Against the Sale of Austria	NEIN	1,037	1.54%	0
Communist Party of Austria	KPÖ	253	0.38%	0
Valid Votes		67,421	100.00%	0
Rejected Votes		1,872	2.70%	
Total Polled		69,293	84.90%	
Registered Electors		81,615		

===== 1994 =====
Results of the 1994 legislative election held on 9 October 1994:

Party		Votes	%	Seats
Social Democratic Party of Austria	SPÖ	16,882	27.02%	0
Austrian People's Party	ÖVP	15,337	24.55%	0
Freedom Party of Austria	FPÖ	14,961	23.95%	0
The Greens – The Green Alternative	GRÜNE	8,309	13.30%	0
Liberal Forum	LiF	5,299	8.48%	0
No – Civic Action Group; Against the Sale of Austria	NEIN	739	1.18%	0
Christian Voters Community	CWG	415	0.66%	0
Natural Law Party	ÖNP	243	0.39%	0
Communist Party of Austria	KPÖ	198	0.32%	0
United Greens Austria – List Adi Pinter	VGÖ	97	0.16%	0
Valid Votes		62,480	100.00%	0
Rejected Votes		1,330	2.08%	
Total Polled		63,810	77.25%	
Registered Electors		82,607		
