= Opinion polling for the 2008 Austrian legislative election =

2008 Austrian legislative election
- 28 September 2008

183 seats in the National Council of Austria 92 seats were needed for a majority
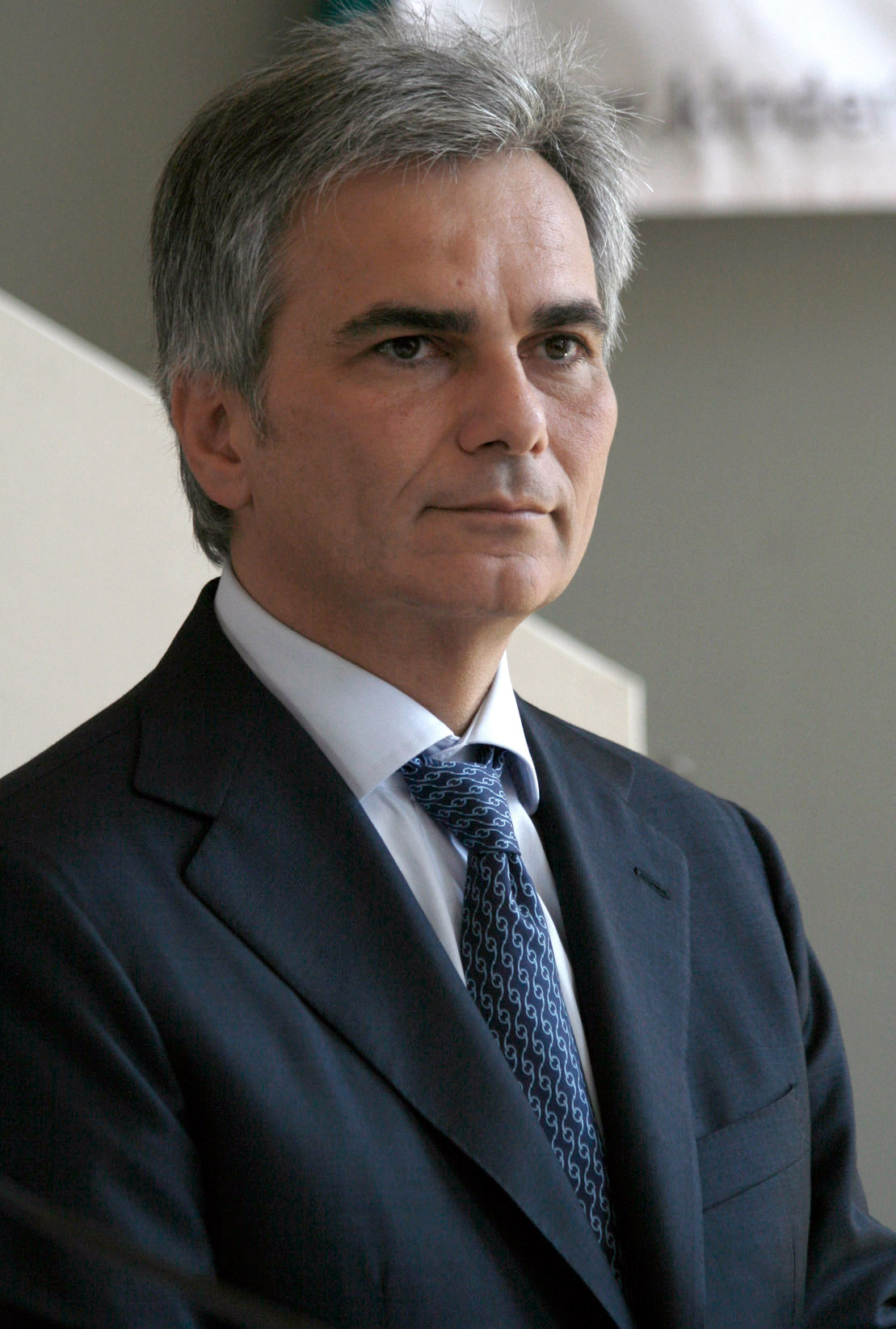

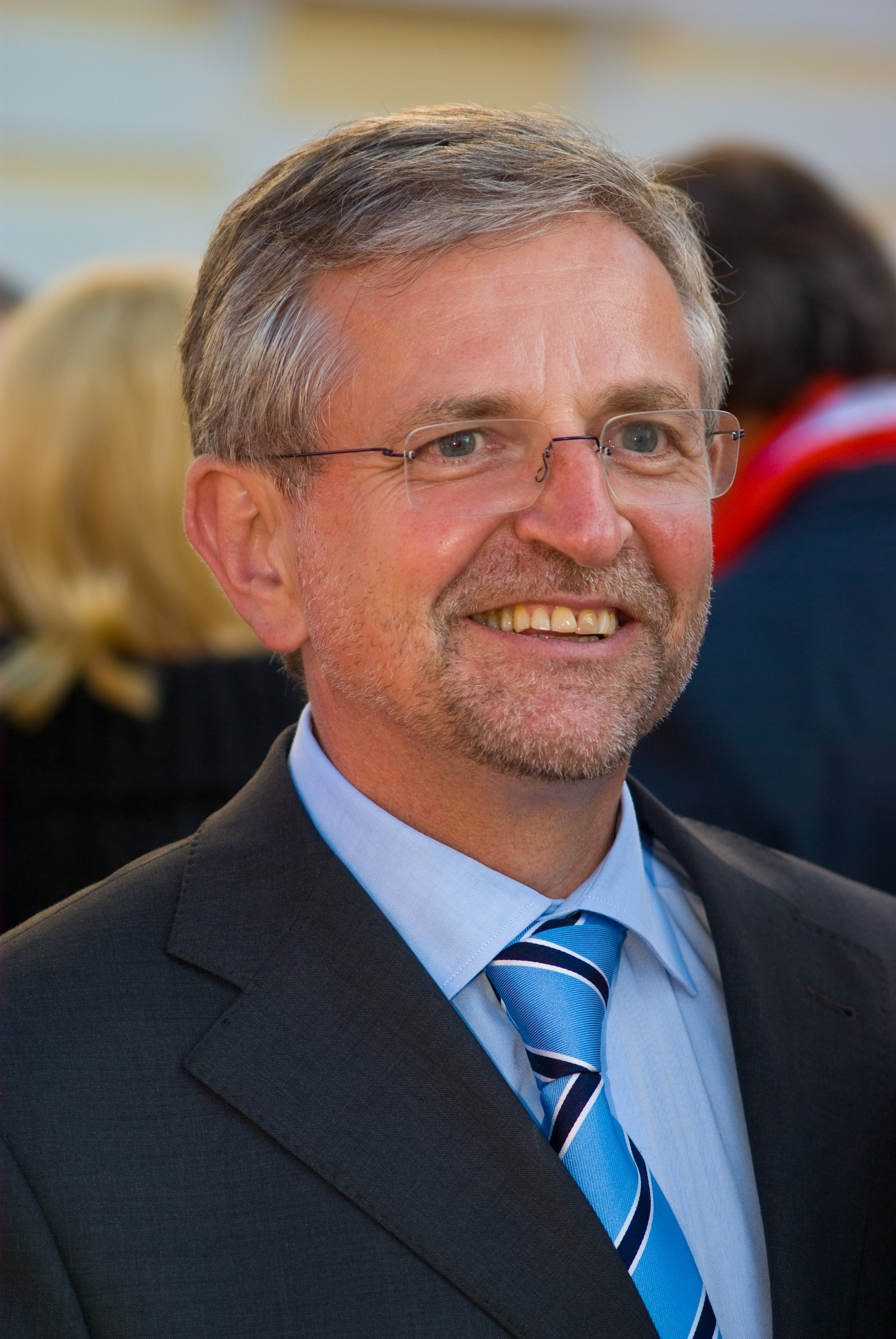

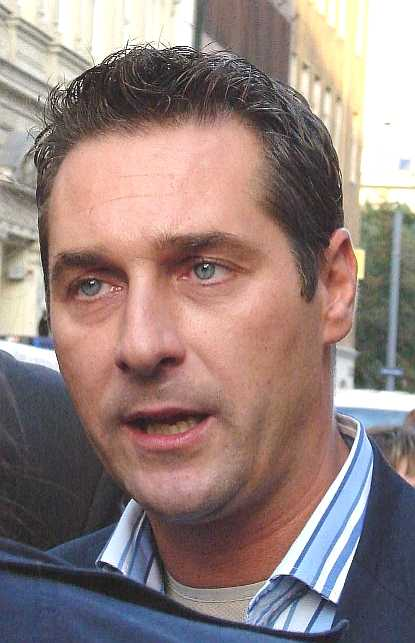

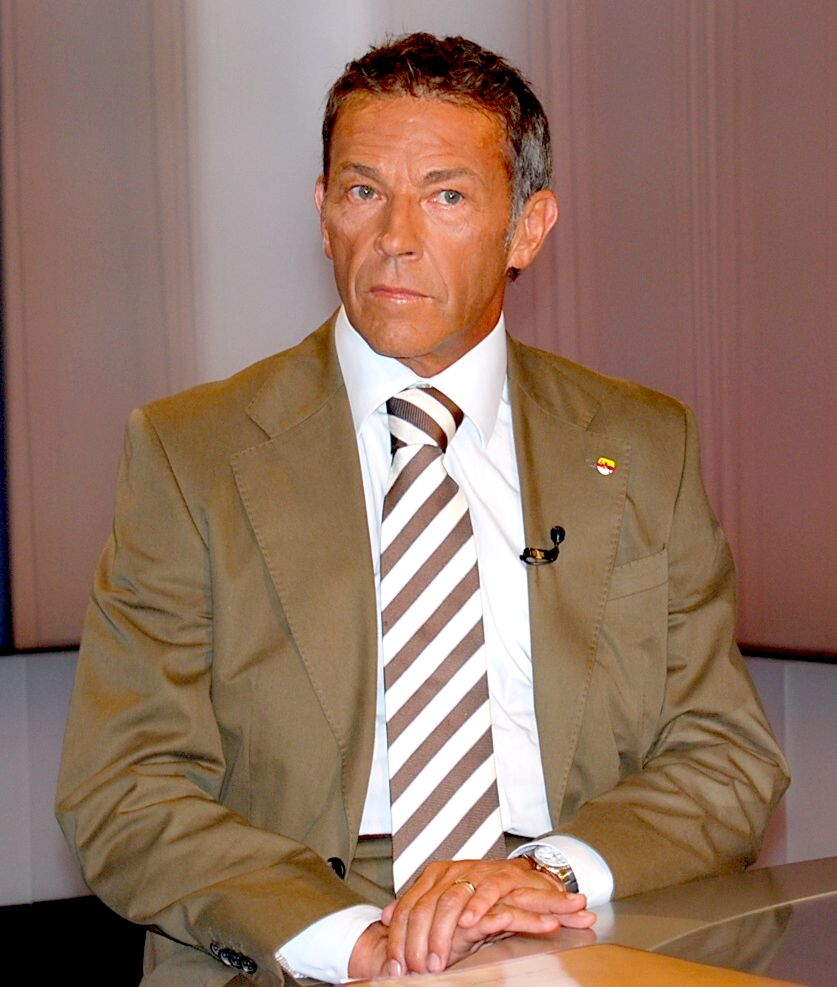

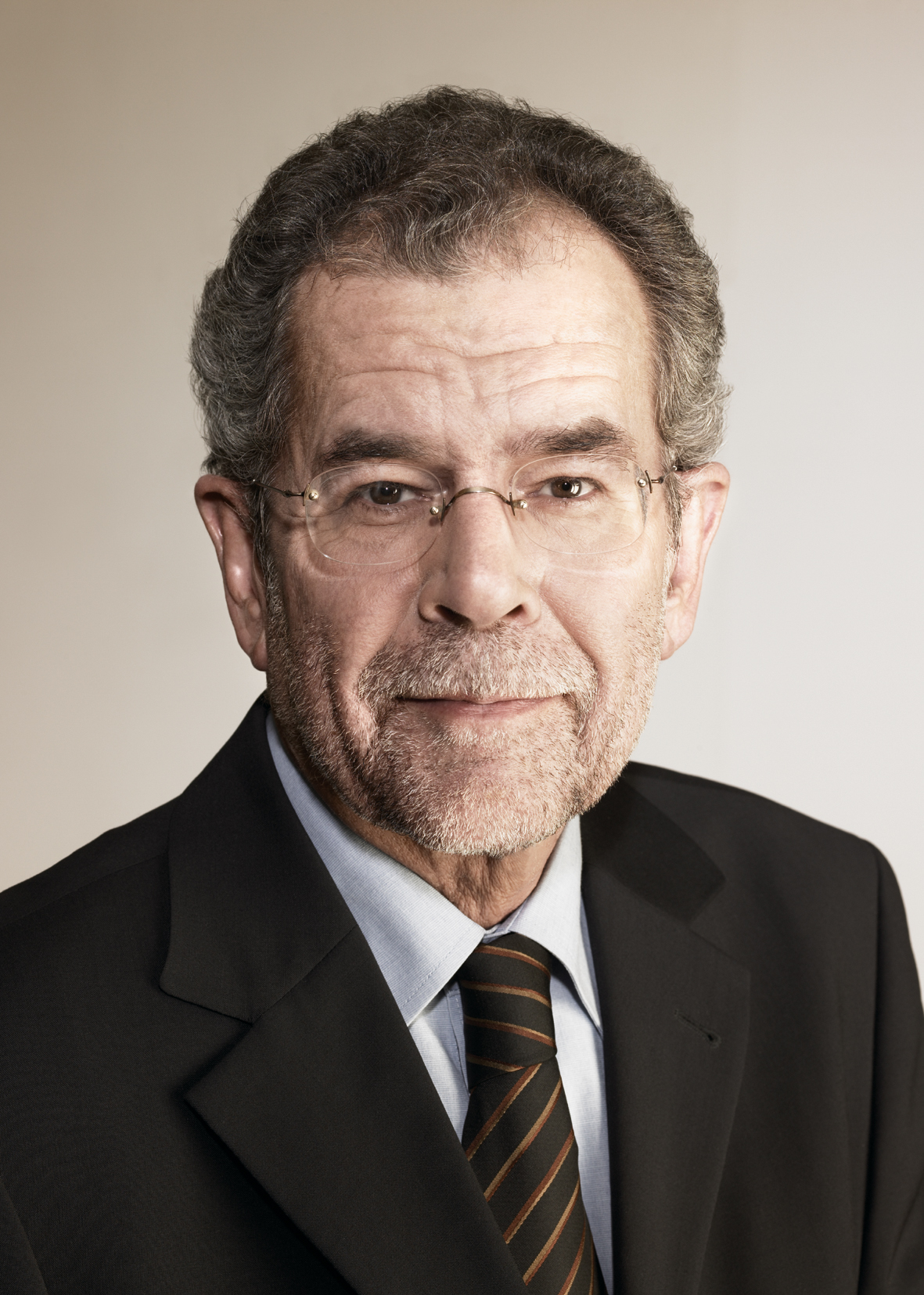

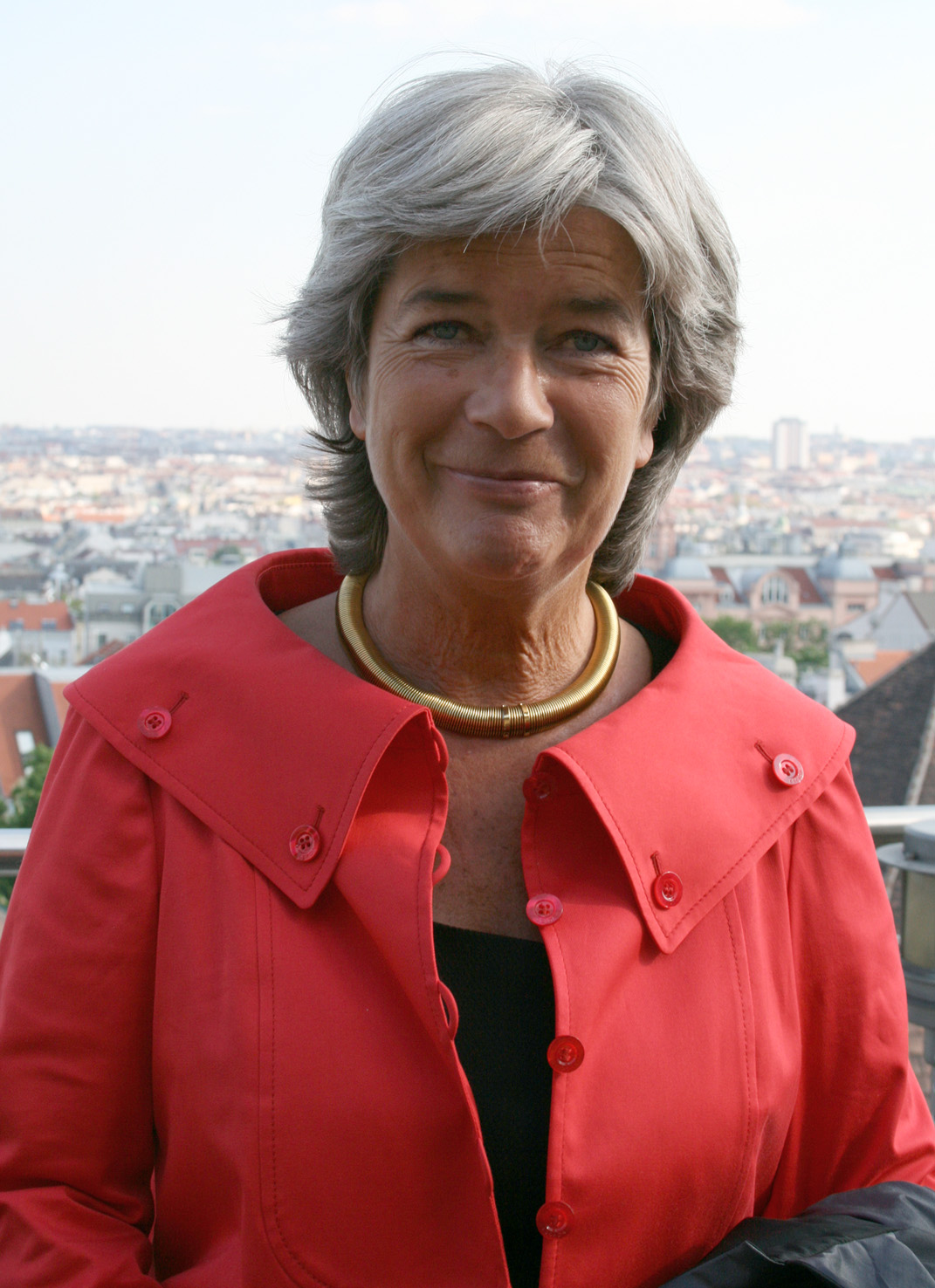
	First party	Second party	Third party
Leader	Werner Faymann	Wilhelm Molterer	Heinz-Christian Strache
Party	SPÖ	ÖVP	FPÖ
Leader since	2008	2007	2005
Leader's seat	9 Vienna	4D Traunviertel	9D Vienna South
Last election	68 seats, 35.34%	66 seats, 34.33%	21 seats, 11.04%
Seats won	57	51	34
Seat change	▼11	▼15	▲13
Popular vote	1,430,206	1,269,656	857,029
Percentage	29.26%	25.98%	17.54%
Swing	▼6.08%	▼8.35%	▲6.50%
	Fourth party	Fifth party	Sixth party
Leader	Jörg Haider	Alexander Van der Bellen	Heide Schmidt
Party	BZÖ	Greens	LiF
Leader since	2008	1997	2008
Leader's seat	2A Klagenfurt	9F Vienna North-West	9F Vienna North-West
Last election	7 seats, 4.11%	21 seats, 11.05%	did not contest on their own
Seats won	21	20	0
Seat change	▲14	▼1	0
Popular vote	522,933	509,936	102,249
Percentage	10.70%	10.43%	2.09%
Swing	▲6.59%	▼0.62%	▲2.09%
Chancellor before election
Alfred Gusenbauer
SPÖ
Elected Chancellor
Werner Faymann
SPÖ

A legislative snap election for the National Council in Austria was held on 28 September 2008. The previous election was held on 1 October 2006. The election (the 24th in Austrian history) was caused by the withdrawal of Austrian People's Party leader Wilhelm Molterer from the governing grand coalition (led by the Social Democratic Party of Austria) on 7 July 2008. Due to dissatisfaction with the grand coalition and the two main parties, it was widely expected to be a realigning election, with gains for the opposition and up to seven parties expected to be in the National Council after the election. The losses for the government parties (both the SPÖ and the ÖVP had the worst election result in history) resulted in strong gains for the far right, while neither the Liberal Forum nor the Citizens' Forum Austria (both of which were considered to have chances of gaining seats) gained as much as 2% of the vote, defying earlier expectations. The result of the election was seen as strong for the far-right and in support of Eurosceptics.

Molterer resigned as party chairman as a result of the losses suffered by the ÖVP and was replaced by environment minister Josef Pröll; the Greens' federal spokesman Alexander Van der Bellen (in office since 1997) also resigned and was replaced by his deputy, Eva Glawischnig. Due to the LIF's failure to enter parliament on its own, LIF founder Heide Schmidt and financier Hans-Peter Haselsteiner both declared their complete withdrawal from politics, and the LIF's fate was seen as uncertain. Shortly after the election, BZÖ leader and Carinthian governor Jörg Haider died in a car accident.

== Opinion polling ==
Agency	Date	SPÖ	ÖVP	GRÜNE	FPÖ	BZÖ	LIF	FRITZ	KPÖ	RETTÖ	DC	Others	SKÖ	MATIN
Election 2006	2006-10-01	35.3	34.3	11.5	11.0	4.1	SPÖ	—	1.0	—	—	3.1	—	—
OGM	2008-06-21	33	33	14	16	4	—	—	—	—	—	—	~	#
market	2008-07-02	27	33	14	21	3	—	—	—	—	—	2	~	#
Fessel-GfK	2008-07-08	28	35	14	20	3	—	—	—	—	—	—	~	#
market	2008-07-09	26	33	14	22	4	—	—	—	—	—	1	~	#
Gallup	2008-07-10	27	32	16	19	4	—	—	—	—	—	2	~	#
Gallup	2008-07-10	21	23	14	18	5	2	7	2	—	—	2	(2)	(4)
Integral	2008-07-12	28	31	14	16	4	—	5	—	—	—	2	~	#
OGM	2008-07-13	30	33	14	18	3	—	—	—	—	—	2	~	#
Gallup	2008-07-17	24	26	16	19	5	2	6	—	—	—	—	~	#
Humaninstitut	2008-07-17	25	28	11	19	2	—	—	—	—	—	15	~	#
IMAS	2008-07-19	24	29	15	20	4	—	5	—	—	—	3	~	#
Gallup	2008-07-25	27	30	16	19	5	—	—	—	—	—	—	~	#
Gallup	2008-07-25	25	29	14	15	7	4	6	—	—	—	—	~	#
OGM	2008-07-29	25	30	13	17	4	4	5	—	—	—	2	~	#
IMAS	2008-07-29	25	29	15	18	6	—	—	—	—	—	—	~	#
Gallup	2008-07-31	23	26	15	17	7	5	7	—	—	—	—	~	#
Fessel-GfK	2008-08-04	25	29	12–13	17–18	2–3	3–4	4–5	—	—	—	—	~	#
market	2008-08-07	26	29	14	20	3	3	4	—	—	—	—	~	#
Gallup	2008-08-08	26	26	14	19	6	3	6	—	—	—	—	~	#
Gallup	2008-08-14	27	28	15	17	5	3	5	—	—	—	—	~	#
OGM	2008-08-16	26	31	13	17	4	4	4	—	—	—	—	~	#
market	2008-08-20	26	27	14	20	5	3	4	—	—	—	1	~	#
IMAS	2008-08-20	27–29	27–29	12–14	17–19	6–8	—	—	—	—	—	7–9	~	#
Gallup	2008-08-24	25	26	15	18	6	4	4	—	—	—	2	~	#
market	2008-08-27	28	26	13	20	4	3	3	—	—	—	3	~	#
Gallup	2008-08-28	27	26	12	19	5	4	4	—	—	—	3	~	#
IFES	2008-08-29	26	26	16	15	5	—	4	—	—	—	8	~	#
IMAS	2008-08-29	26–28	25–27	12–14	17–19	6–8	3–4	3–4	1–2	1–2	0–1	—	~	#
Fessel-GfK	2008-08-30	28	26	12	17	>4	4	—	—	—	—	<9	~	#
OGM	2008-08-31	27	28	12	18	6	4	3	—	—	—	2	~	#
market	2008-09-03	28	25	12	20	5	3	3	1	1	—	2	~	#
Gallup	2008-09-04	28	27	12	17	6	4	3	—	—	—	3	~	#
Humaninstitut	2008-09-04	32	19	12	19	10	4	4	—	—	—	—	~	#
OGM	2008-09-06	29	27	12	17	7	4	2	—	—	—	2	~	#
GMK	2008-09-08	30	27	11	18	6	3	4	—	—	—	—	~	#
market	2008-09-10	29	27	11	18	7	3	2	—	—	—	3	~	#
Fessel-GfK	2008-09-11	25.8	28.5	17	12.7	6.7	2.1	1.2	3.3	—	1.5	1.2	~	#
Gallup	2008-09-12	28	27	12	16	6	4	3	—	—	—	4	~	#
IFES	2008-09-12	27	27	13	17	5	4	3	—	—	—	4	~	#
Spectra	2008-09-12	28–31	26–29	11–13	15–17	7–9	2–4	1–3	—	—	—	—	~	#
OGM	2008-09-13	28	26	12	18	8	4	2	—	—	—	2	~	#
Integral	2008-09-16	28	28	12	18	7	4	2	—	—	—	2	~	#
market	2008-09-16	29	26	11	20	6	3	2	—	—	—	3	~	#
Gallup	2008-09-18	28	26	12	17	8	4	3	—	—	—	2	~	#
OGM	2008-09-20	29	26	11	18	8	4	2	—	—	—	2	~	#
market	2008-09-23	29	27	10	19	8	3	2	—	—	—	2	~	#
IFES	2008-09-26	27	27	12	16	7	5	2	—	—	—	4	~	#
Gallup	2008-09-26	29	27	12	17	8	3	2	—	—	—	2	~	#
Results	2008-09-28	29.3	26.0	10.4	17.5	10.7	2.1	1.8	0.8	0.7	0.6	0.9	~	#

~ Failed to collect the required signatures.
# Decided not to contest the election.

Kanzlerfrage (chancellor question)

Agency	Date	Faymann (SPÖ)	Molterer (ÖVP)	Van der Bellen (GRÜNE)	Strache (FPÖ)	Haider (BZÖ)	Schmidt (LIF)	Dinkhauser (FRITZ)
market	2008-07-09	26	29	—	—	—	—	—
Gallup	2008-07-10	40	31	—	—	—	—	—
OGM	2008-07-13	19	18	10	11	3*	—	—
Gallup	2008-07-17	38	31	—	—	—	—	—
Gallup	2008-07-25	39	30	—	—	—	—	—
Gallup	2008-07-31	42	23	—	—	—	—	—
Gallup	2008-08-09	45	26	—	—	—	—	—
Gallup	2008-08-09	40	27	—	—	—	—	—
OGM	2008-08-17	22	19	12	8	6	—	—
Gallup	2008-08-24	42	25	—	—	—	—	—
market	2008-08-27	35	20	—	—	—	—	—
Gallup	2008-08-28	46	27	—	—	—	—	—
OGM	2008-08-31	21	18	12	8	6	2	4
market	2008-09-03	35	21	—	—	—	—	—
Gallup	2008-09-04	45	28	—	—	—	—	—
OGM	2008-09-06	24	17	12	8	8	4	3
market	2008-09-10	35	20	—	—	—	—	—
Gallup	2008-09-12	47	31	—	—	—	—	—
Spectra	2008-09-12	28	17	11	10	9	4	3
OGM	2008-09-13	22	15	9	11	9	4	3
market	2008-09-16	33	23	—	—	—	—	—
Gallup	2008-09-18	45	32	—	—	—	—	—
OGM	2009-09-20	23	16	8	10	9	4	2

* Westenthaler was polled instead of Haider before it was announced that Westenthaler would not be the leading candidate.

Koalitionsfrage (coalition question)

Agency	Date	SPÖ–ÖVP	ÖVP–SPÖ	SPÖ–GRÜNE	ÖVP–GRÜNE	SPÖ–FPÖ(–BZÖ)	ÖVP–FPÖ(–BZÖ)
OGM	14 July 2008	7	9	9	13	6	9
Gallup	4 August 2008	16°	16°	27	18	7	9
OGM	5 September 2008	10	10	11	9	11	13
Gallup	15 September 2008	18°	18°	20	13	17	5

° The two types of grand coalition were not polled separately.

=== State polls ===
State	Agency	Date	SPÖ	ÖVP	GRÜNE	FPÖ	BZÖ	LIF	FRITZ	Others
Salzburg	IFG	2008-07-10	23	37	11	17	5	—	4	3
Salzburg	IFG	2008-09-11	27	31	11	15	7	3	2	4
Upper Austria	Spectra	2008-08-02	28–30	26–28	13–15	16–18	4–6	1–3	—	6–8
Vienna	OEKONSULT	2008-08-17	39.20	16.04	17.08	20.18	3.23	—	—	4.27

Kanzlerfrage (chancellor question)

State	Agency	Date	Faymann (SPÖ)	Molterer (ÖVP)	Strache (FPÖ)	Van der Bellen (GRÜNE)	Haider (BZÖ)
Upper Austria	Spectra	2008-08-02	44	26	—	—	—

Koalitionsfrage (coalition question)

State	Agency	Date	SPÖ–ÖVP	SPÖ–GRÜNE	ÖVP–GRÜNE	SPÖ–FPÖ(–BZÖ)	ÖVP–FPÖ(–BZÖ)
Salzburg	IFG	10 July 2008	16	17	22	9	19
Salzburg	IFG	11 September 2008	26	11	18	11	10
