= 2008 Austrian legislative election =

- 28 September 2008

All 183 seats in the National Council 92 seats needed for a majority
- Opinion polls
- Turnout: 78.8% (▲0.3 pp)
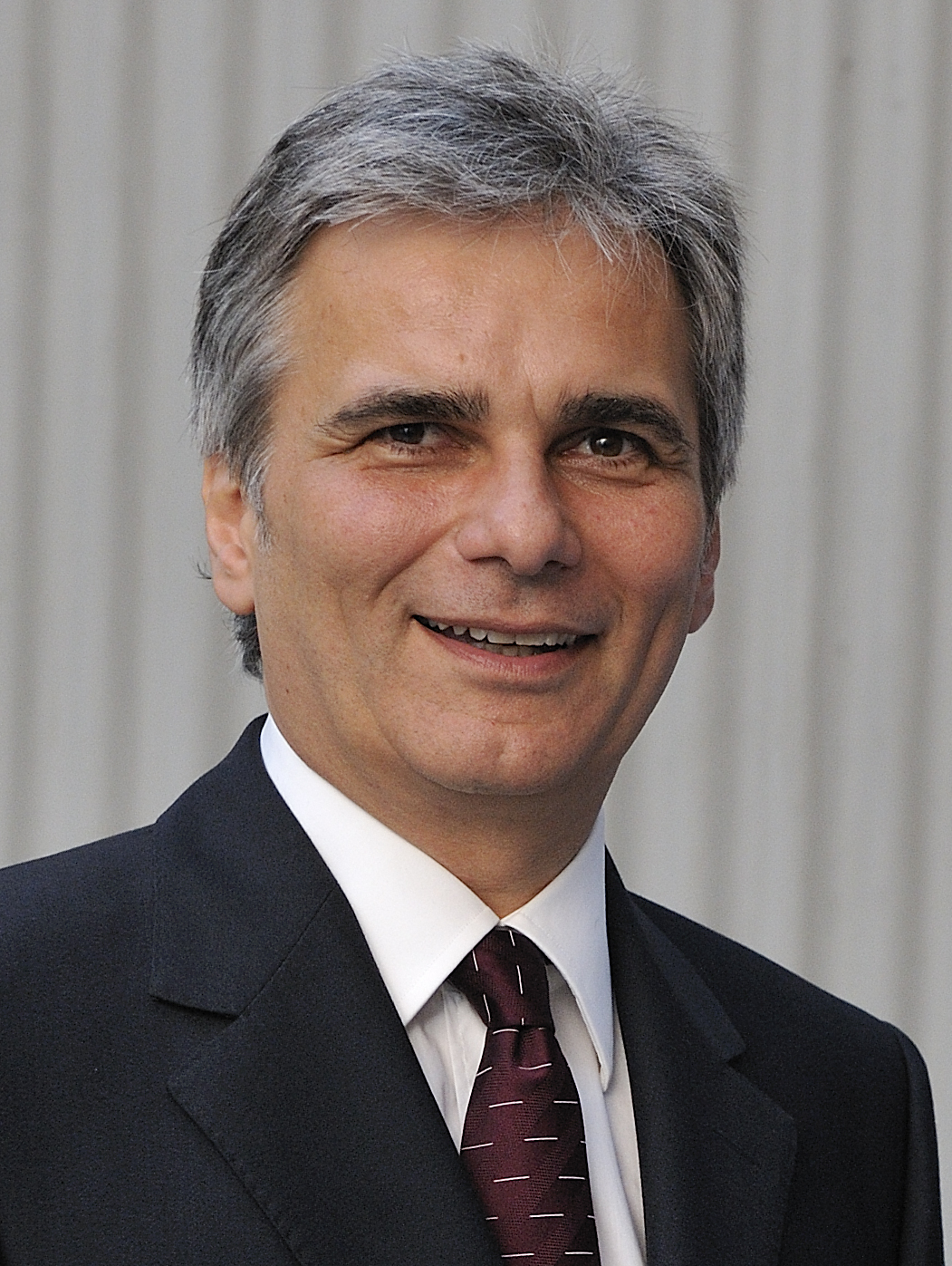

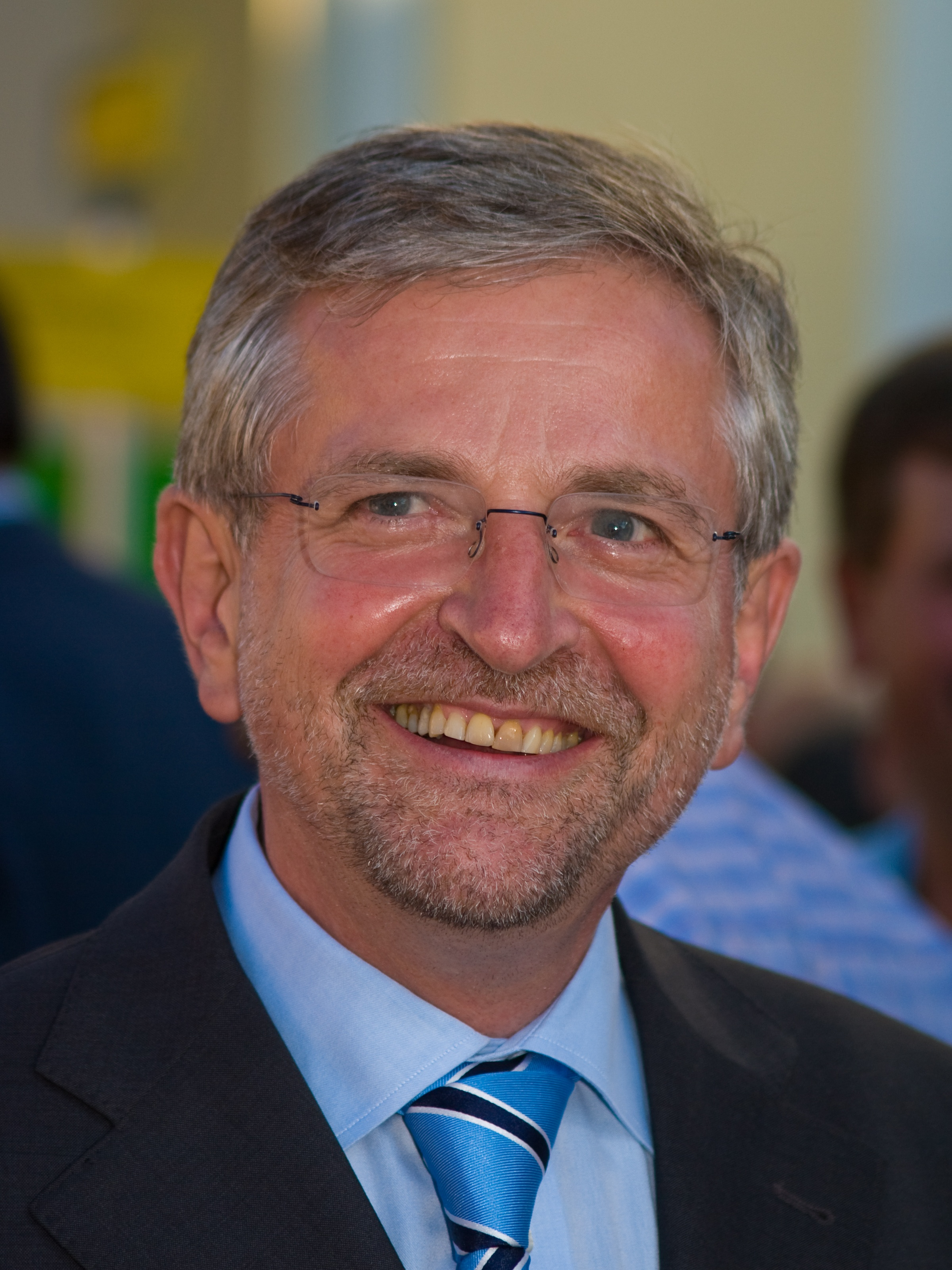

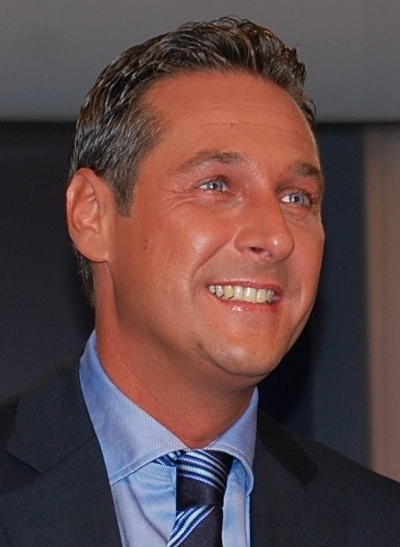

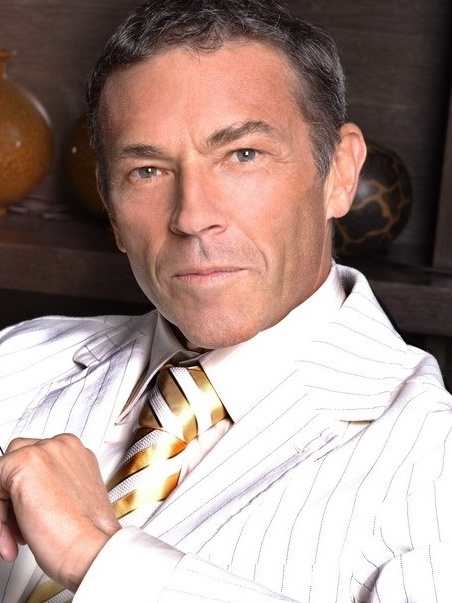

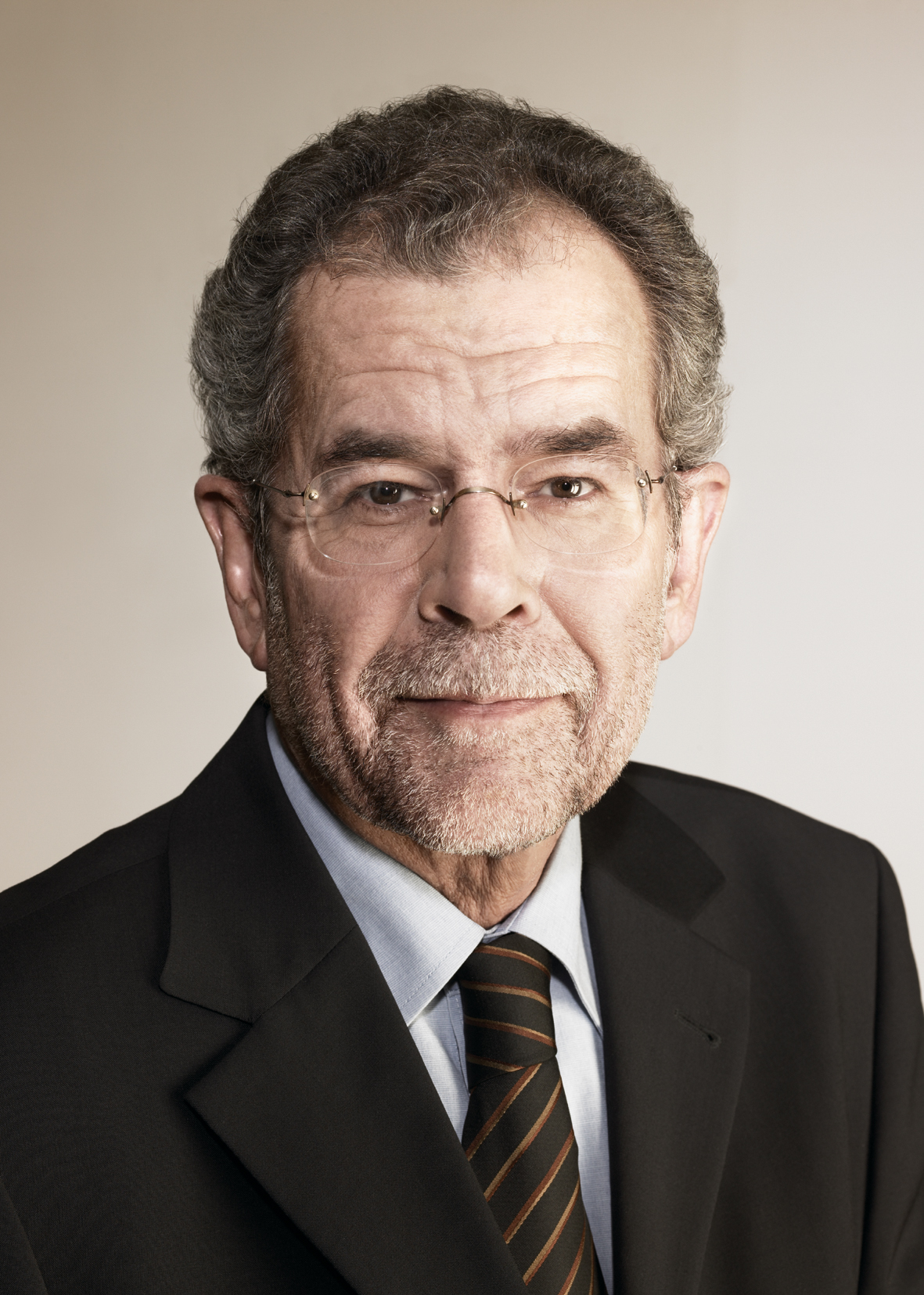
	First party	Second party	Third party
Leader	Werner Faymann	Wilhelm Molterer	Heinz-Christian Strache
Party	SPÖ	ÖVP	FPÖ
Last election	35.3%, 68 seats	34.3%, 66 seats	11.0%, 21 seats
Seats won	57	51	34
Seat change	▼11	▼15	▲13
Popular vote	1,430,206	1,269,656	857,029
Percentage	29.3%	26.0%	17.5%
Swing	▼6.1 pp	▼8.3 pp	▲6.5 pp
	Fourth party	Fifth party
Leader	Jörg Haider	Alexander Van der Bellen
Party	BZÖ	Greens
Last election	4.1%, 7 seats	11.0%, 21 seats
Seats won	21	20
Seat change	▲14	▼1
Popular vote	522,933	509,936
Percentage	10.7%	10.4%
Swing	▲6.6 pp	▼0.6 pp
Chancellor before election
Alfred Gusenbauer
SPÖ
Elected Chancellor
Werner Faymann
SPÖ

Legislative elections were held in Austria on 28 September 2008 to elect the 24th National Council, the lower house of Austria's bicameral parliament. The snap election was called after Austrian People's Party (ÖVP) withdrew from the ruling grand coalition with the Social Democratic Party of Austria (SPÖ) in July. Due to dissatisfaction with the governing parties, the opposition and minor parties were expected to make significant gains. Opinion polling indicated that up to seven parties could potentially win seats.

The SPÖ and ÖVP each suffered their worst election results in history up to this point, losing 6.1 and 8.3 percentage points respectively. The Freedom Party of Austria (FPÖ) and Alliance for the Future of Austria (BZÖ) captured the largest portion of these lost votes, each recording a six and a half-point swing. The Greens took small losses, while Liberal Forum (LiF) and Citizens' Forum Austria (FRITZ) both fell well short of the 4% electoral threshold, defying earlier expectations that they could enter the National Council. The result was perceived as a success for the right-wing populist and Eurosceptic parties.

Following the elections, Wilhelm Molterer resigned as chairman of the ÖVP and was replaced by agriculture minister Josef Pröll. The Greens' federal spokesman Alexander Van der Bellen, who had served since 1997, also resigned and was succeeded by his deputy Eva Glawischnig. Due to the Liberal Forum's failure to win seats, party founder Heide Schmidt and financier Hans-Peter Haselsteiner both announced their retirement from politics. Less than two weeks after the election, BZÖ leader and governor of Carinthia Jörg Haider died in a car accident.

A coalition between the SPÖ and the ÖVP was agreed upon on 23 November 2008 and was sworn in on 2 December 2008.

== Background ==
On 11 January 2007, the Gusenbauer cabinet (a grand coalition of SPÖ and ÖVP) was sworn into office. The newly formed government was criticised from the beginning from parts of the opposition and left-wing circles in the SPÖ for having failed to push through in the coalition negotiations most of the pledges and promises made in the election campaign.

The SPÖ began to fall back in the polls almost immediately. The government was frequently unable to agree on important decisions: The SPÖ demanded an antedated tax reform in 2009 instead of in 2010, which the ÖVP disagreed on; the proposal to help households hit by inflation with a tax gift of €100 was also denied by the ÖVP. The coalition partners also disagreed on the badly necessary health system reform. In the Tyrolean state election on 8 June 2008 the former ÖVP member Fritz Dinkhauser led his newly founded Citizens' Forum Tyrol to become the second-largest party, causing large losses to ÖVP and SPÖ and small losses to the Greens. Following this, internal criticism within the SPÖ of Gusenbauer grew, leading to the decision to designate infrastructure minister Werner Faymann as its new party leader. According to the plans at that time, Gusenbauer would have remained the leading candidate in the 2010 elections.

On 26 June 2008, Faymann and Gusenbauer wrote a letter to the editor of the leading Austrian tabloid Kronen Zeitung, declaring they were in favour of referendums on important EU topics, like new treaties after the already ratified Treaty of Lisbon or the accession of Turkey to the European Union. They did this without seeking the approval of either the party leadership or their coalition partner ÖVP; it was widely perceived by Austrian and foreign media as a populist action and in acquiesce to the Eurosceptic position of Kronen Zeitung. On 7 July 2008, ÖVP leader Wilhelm Molterer declared that he could not continue to work with the SPÖ (the precise words with which he opened the news conference were "That's enough!", Es reicht!). The ÖVP declared as the main reasons for the snap elections the change in the SPÖ's position on Europe and the planned dual leadership in the SPÖ, which the ÖVP claimed would make agreement on difficult issues even harder.

The snap election was officially called in a parliamentary session on 9 July 2008 through a joint resolution by SPÖ, ÖVP and Greens, which FPÖ and BZÖ supported; the election date of 28 September 2008 was confirmed by the government and the main committee on 10 July 2008. The term of the legislature was the third-shortest in Austrian history (after 1970–1971 and 1994–1995). SPÖ and ÖVP agreed to a so-called Stillhalteabkommen, an agreement according to which neither of the two parties would try to outvote the other with the votes of the opposition parties, although this agreement was revoked by Faymann on 25 August 2008.

The age required to have the right to vote had been reduced from 18 to 16 prior to the election in an electoral law reform enacted in 2007, which also had reduced the age required to stand in the election from 19 to 18, had introduced easier access to postal balloting and had lengthened the legislative term from four to five years. Another change was that different list names in the different states were no longer possible; the BZÖ had stood under a different name in Carinthia than in the rest of Austria in 2006. Turnout was initially expected to increase from the all-time low of 78.5% in 2006; more than 80% were expected to participate in the election according to early estimates, but it expectations changed to a decrease of turnout as the election day came closer. Postal balloting was expected to make up 7%–8% of the total vote; due to postal votes, the final result of the election would not be known until a week after the elections (on 6 October 2008). Postal ballots had to be sent to electoral commission together with a signed piece of paper stating the time and place when the vote had taken place; at a spot check in Salzburg, 20% of postal ballots were invalid because they lacked the signature or time and place. 9.27% of the voters (586,759 of 6,332,931 voters) had requested postal ballots, which meant that postal ballots could decisively change the election outcome.

Another part of the 2007 electoral reform was that it was now possible to accommodate election observers in the election process. The Organisation for Economic Co-operation and Development declined the invitation to send observers, however, stating that the Office for Democratic Institutions and Human Rights had insufficient funds to send observers on such short notice.

The Swiss Neue Zürcher Zeitung stated that Dinkhauser had "with hindsight been the first link in a chain of causation which led to the early elections, even though he had only wanted to force open the encrusted political landscape in Tyrol."

== Contesting parties ==
The table below lists parties represented in the 23rd National Council.

Name		Ideology	Leader	2006 result	
Name		Ideology	Leader	Votes (%)	Seats
SPÖ	Social Democratic Party of Austria; Sozialdemokratische Partei Österreichs	Social democracy	Werner Faymann	35.3%	68 / 183
ÖVP	Austrian People's Party; Österreichische Volkspartei	Christian democracy	Wilhelm Molterer	34.3%	66 / 183
GRÜNE	The Greens; Die Grünen	Green politics	Alexander Van der Bellen	11.1%	21 / 183
FPÖ	Freedom Party of Austria; Freiheitliche Partei Österreichs	Right-wing populism Euroscepticism	Heinz-Christian Strache	11.0%	21 / 183
BZÖ	Alliance for the Future of Austria; Bündnis Zukunft Österreich	National conservatism Right-wing populism	Jörg Haider	4.1%	7 / 183

=== Qualified parties ===
In addition to the parties already represented in the National Council, nine parties collected enough signatures to be placed on the ballot. Five of these were cleared to be on the ballot in all states, four of them only in some.

==== On the ballot in all 9 states ====
- Liberal Forum (LiF)
- Citizens' Forum Austria Fritz Dinkhauser's List (FRITZ)
- Communist Party of Austria (KPÖ)
- Independent Citizens' Initiative Save Austria (RETTÖ)
- The Christians (DC)

==== On the ballot in some states only ====
- Left (Linke) – on the ballot only in Burgenland, Salzburg, Tyrol, Upper Austria, and Vienna
- Animal Rights Party (TRP) – on the ballot only in Vienna
- List Karlheinz Klement – on the ballot only in Carinthia
- List Strong – on the ballot only in Carinthia

== Analyses and forecasts ==
Analysts and pollsters offered different opinions on whether smaller extraparliamentary parties had chances to enter parliament or not. According to some pollsters, the FRITZ had very good chances of getting into parliament, and the LIF with its founder Schmidt as its leading candidate, as well; the conditions were as good as they had never been before for smaller parties, according to some. Analysts agreed that apart from LIF and FRITZ, all others would fail to enter parliament. Analysts furthermore asserted that the candidacy of the FRITZ would likely make the race for third place between Greens and FPÖ very competitive, as the FRITZ would likely gain protest votes which would otherwise go to the FPÖ. The critical time for the extraparliamentary parties was stated to be the very first phase of the campaign, when the larger parties had not yet really started campaigning and the smaller parties had a chance to gain publicity.

Following the announcement that Haider would return to federal politics, analysts held different opinions on the likely effects of this change. While the race for swing voters between ÖVP, FPÖ and BZÖ was seen to intensify, it was also remarked that Haider has lost much of his appeal and that it would be unlikely that the BZÖ would increase its share of votes just because of his candidacy. The race for third place between the Greens and the FPÖ was seen to be balanced (as Haider might draw votes from the FPÖ and the LIF from the Greens) or slightly in favour of the Greens. One analyst even expected that Haider would attempt to get the FPÖ to adopt a partner relationship with the BZÖ (similar to the Christian Democratic Union–Christian Social Union of Bavaria alliance in Germany), with the BZÖ only operating in Carinthia and the FPÖ in the rest of Austria, after the 2008 election. Stadler confirmed that this was the goal of the BZÖ. Strache explicitly ruled out such an alliance on 7 September 2008.

Four weeks before the election, analysts agreed that the climate was very good for the SPÖ following Faymann's announcement that he would take measures against rising prices, although they also cautioned that the SPÖ's victory was not yet a done deal. The FPÖ was seen as strongly increasing their share of the votes when compared to the 2006 election and the BZÖ was seen as having secured its stay in the National Council. The Greens were seen to be stagnating, while the extraparliamentary parties faced difficulties with entering parliament, with the chances of LIF and the FRITZ intact.

Former ÖVP leader Wolfgang Schüssel claimed on 4 September 2008 the ÖVP's low numbers in the polls were due to the large number of parties contesting the election and denied that the ÖVP had made mistakes in their election campaign so far. Analysts asserted that the Greens' decision to strongly support the animal rights activists remanded in custody under controversial circumstances (see above) might be risky, but that it might pay off through the increased publicity and mobilisation of core voters.

Only four possible coalitions were seen as likely to have a majority after the election: SPÖ–ÖVP, ÖVP–FPÖ–BZÖ, SPÖ–GRÜNE–BZÖ and SPÖ–FPÖ–BZÖ; all but a new grand coalition were seen as unlikely.

== Campaign ==
Campaigning in the 2008 Austrian legislative election revolved around inflation, rising prices, transport, future treaties of the European Union, crime, integration, right to stay, education, privatisation of Austrian Airlines, budgets, TV schedule, fairness accord, the Eurofighter Typhoon contract renegotiation and the Role of the Kronen Zeitung.

== Election day ==
For the first time in the history of Austrian elections, there were different ballots in all nine states (in 2002 there were three different ballots, in 2006 there were seven). The ballots featured parliamentary parties in the order of votes they received in the last election, i.e. SPÖ, ÖVP, Greens, FPÖ, BZÖ. The extraparliamentary parties were listed in the order in which they submitted their state candidate lists, and this order was different in all nine states; Dinkhauser, for instance, wanted the FRITZ to be the last on the ballot in all nine states, but the Left (in Burgenland and Tyrol) and the Christians (in Salzburg) submitted their lists after he did. The longest ballots could be found in Carinthia and Vienna, which broke the previous record of eleven lists (Vorarlberg, 1994) with twelve lists. Burgenland, Salzburg, Tyrol and Upper Austria had eleven lists, and Lower Austria, Styria and Vorarlberg had only the ten national lists on the ballot.

National candidate lists had to be submitted by 8 September 2008 and were published on [12 September 2008 in the Wiener Zeitung; all lists except STARK and Klement submitted national candidate lists.

Voting booths closed at 13:00 in Vorarlberg, at 16:00 in Carinthia, Styria and Upper Austria, at 16:30 in Burgenland and at 17:00 in Lower Austria, Salzburg, Tyrol and Vienna.

== Results ==
Party	Votes	%	Seats	+/–
Social Democratic Party of Austria	1,430,206	29.26	57	−11
Austrian People's Party	1,269,656	25.98	51	−15
Freedom Party of Austria	857,029	17.54	34	+13
Alliance for the Future of Austria	522,933	10.70	21	+14
The Greens	509,936	10.43	20	−1
Liberal Forum	102,249	2.09	0	0
Fritz Dinkhauser List – Citizens' Forum Tyrol	86,194	1.76	0	New
Communist Party of Austria	37,362	0.76	0	0
Independent Citizens' Initiative Save Austria	35,718	0.73	0	New
The Christians	31,080	0.64	0	New
Animal Rights Party	2,224	0.05	0	New
Left (Note: The party ran as "The Left" in Tyrol.)	2,138	0.04	0	0
List Karlheinz Klement	347	0.01	0	New
List Strong	237	0.00	0	0
Total	4,887,309	100.00	183	0
Valid votes	4,887,309	97.92		
Invalid/blank votes	103,643	2.08		
Total votes	4,990,952	100.00		
Registered voters/turnout	6,333,109	78.81		
Source: BMI

=== Results by state ===
State	SPÖ	ÖVP	FPÖ	BZÖ	Grüne	Others	Turnout
Burgenland	40.1	29.1	16.2	5.3	5.7	3.6	86.4
Carinthia	28.1	14.6	7.6	38.5	6.9	4.3	78.5
Lower Austria	30.4	32.2	18.1	6.3	8.1	4.9	84.5
Upper Austria	30.5	26.8	19.0	9.1	9.9	4.7	82.0
Salzburg	23.8	29.1	17.7	12.2	11.8	5.4	78.6
Styria	29.3	26.2	17.3	13.2	8.5	5.5	79.0
Tyrol	18.0	31.1	17.0	9.7	11.1	13.1	70.6
Vorarlberg	14.1	31.3	16.1	12.8	17.2	8.5	71.4
Vienna	34.8	16.7	20.4	4.7	16.0	7.4	73.6
Austria	29.3	26.0	17.5	10.7	10.4	6.1	78.8
Source: Austrian Interior Ministry

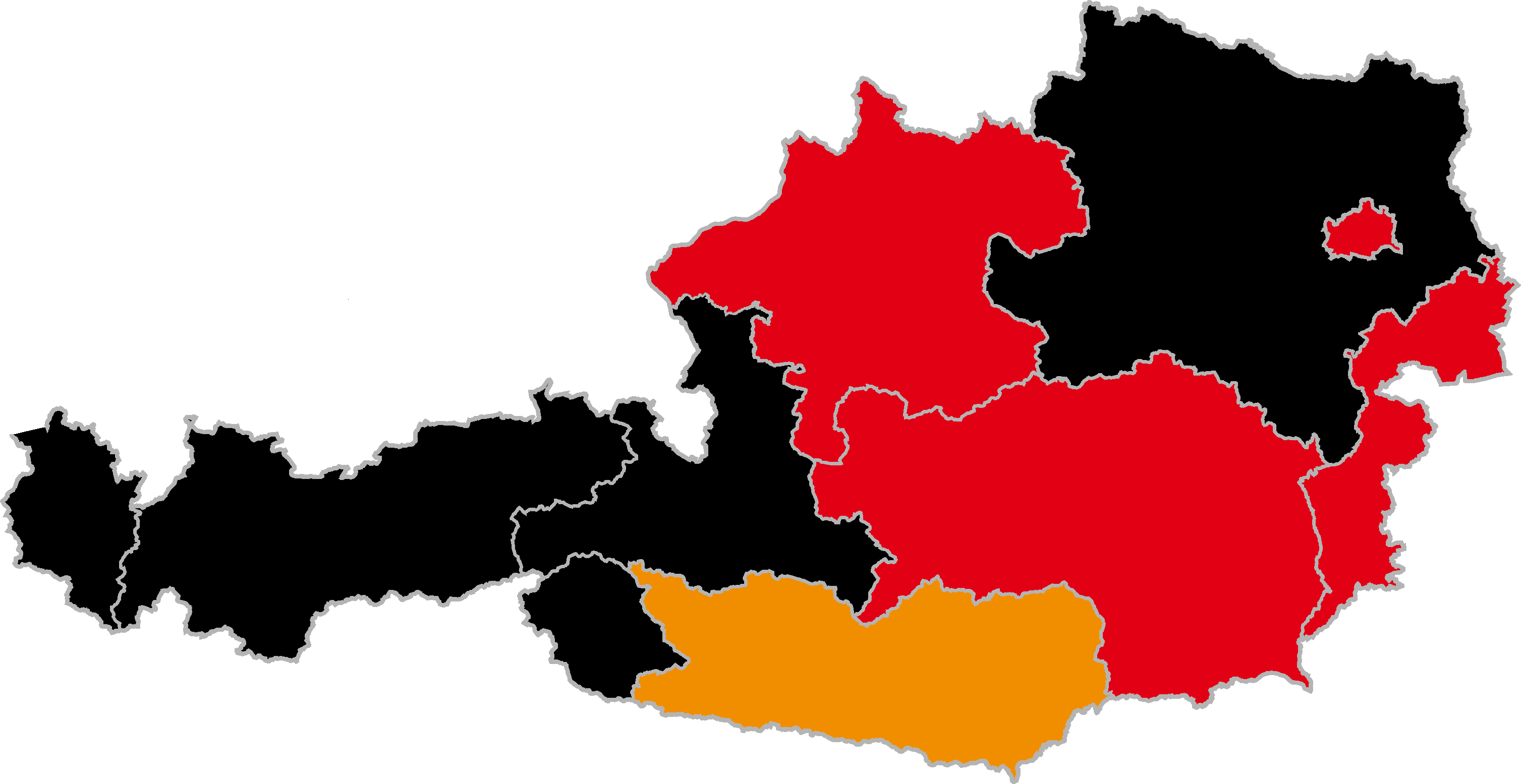
Map showing the results of the election on the state level

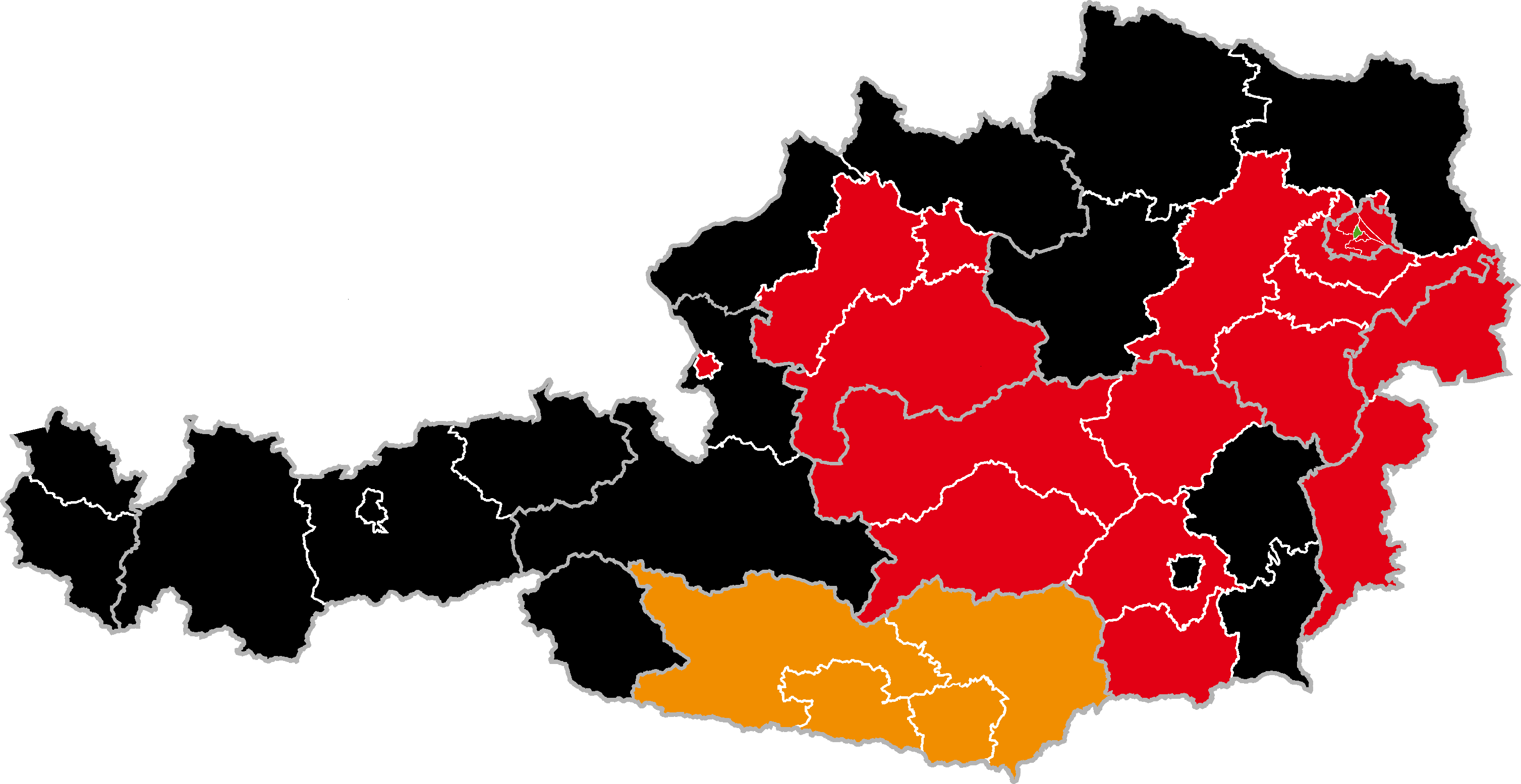
Map showing the results of the election on the sub-constituency level

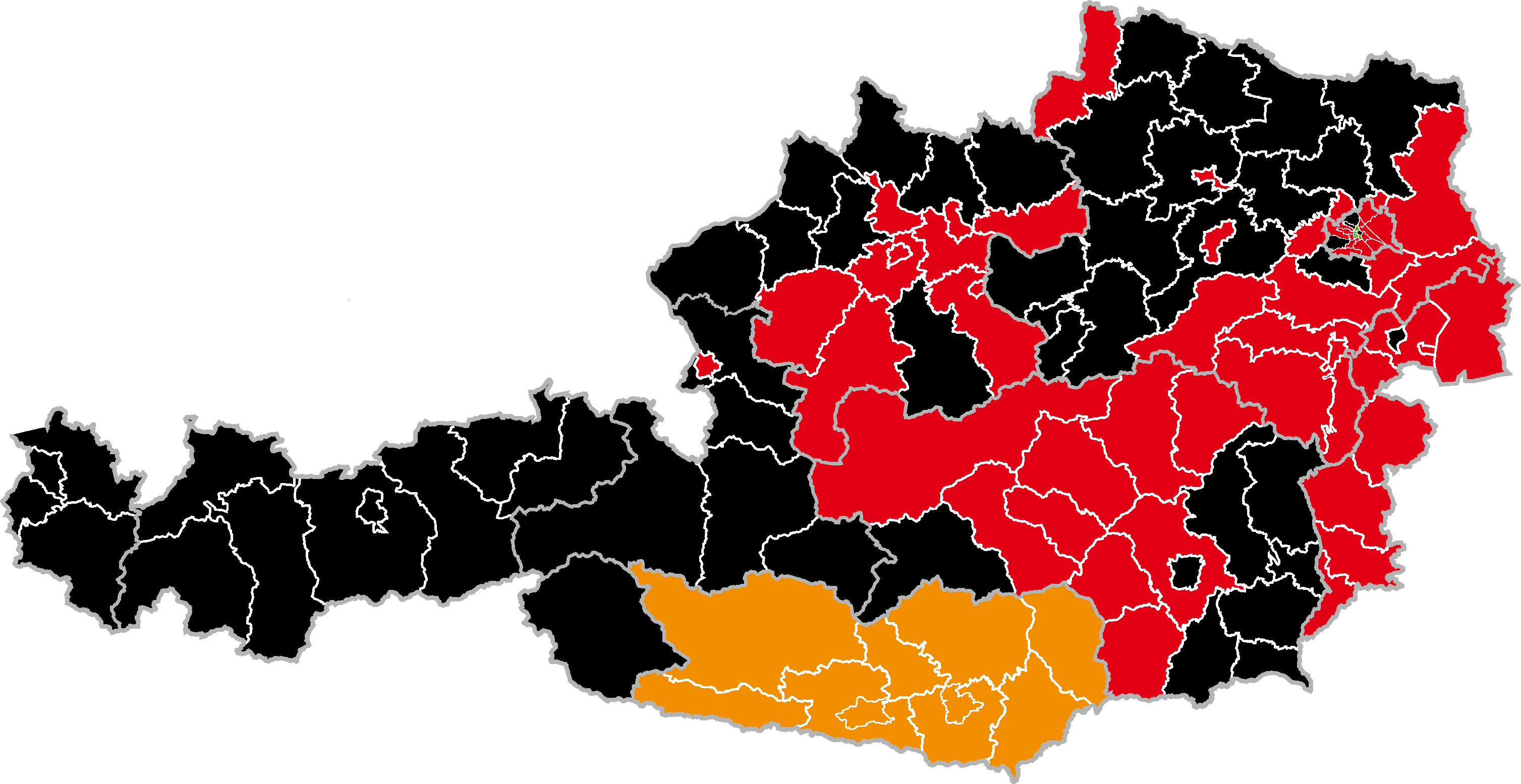
Map showing the results of the election on the district level

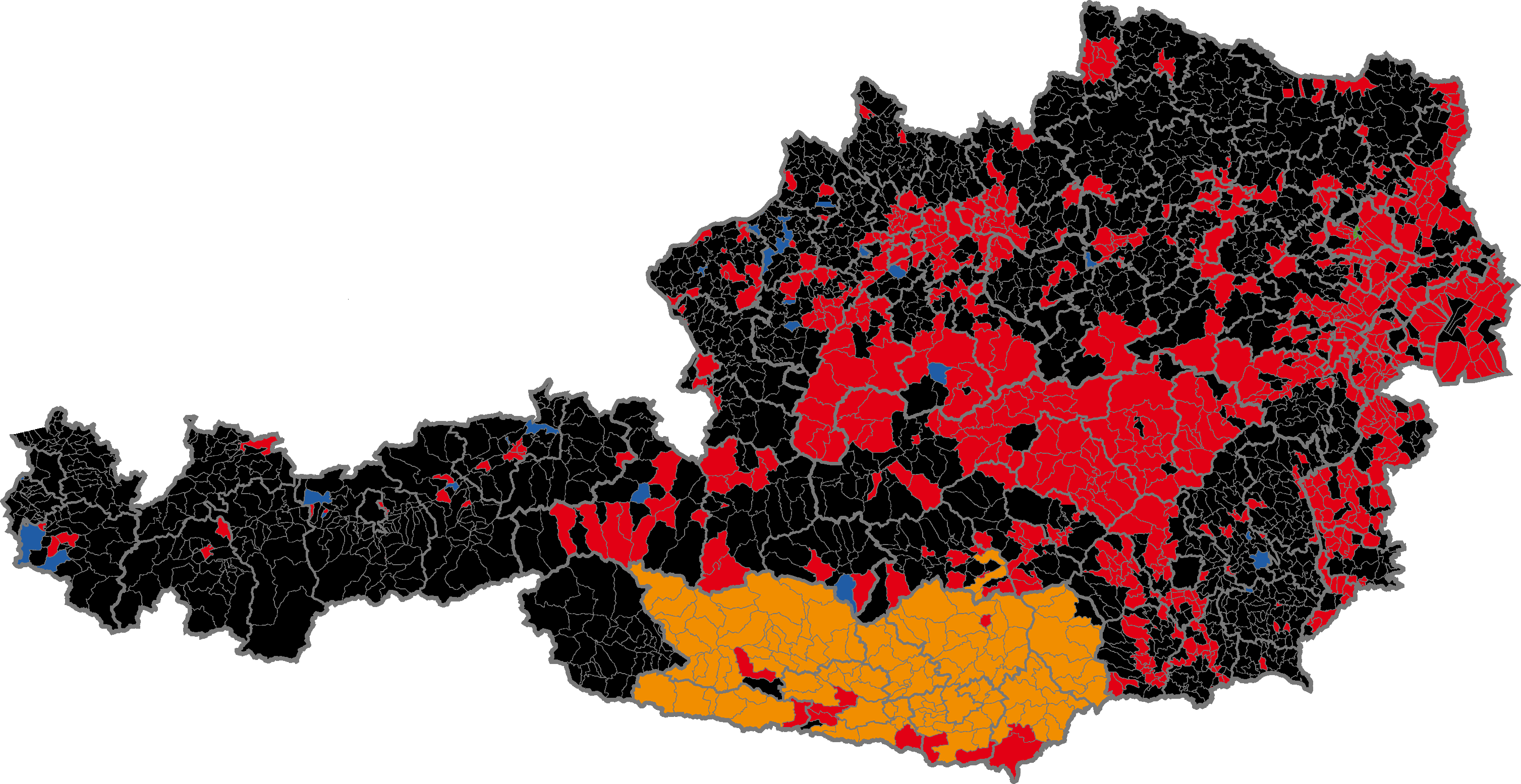
Map showing the results of the election on the municipal level

== Reactions ==
The elections saw a historically low turnout. Both the SPÖ and the ÖVP had the worst result in history, while the combined so-called "third camp" (drittes Lager, consisting of the FPÖ and the BZÖ) had the best result the far right has had in the Second Austrian Republic, very nearly gaining a plurality of seats if taken together. The Greens suffered slight losses, while neither the LIF nor the Citizens' Forum Austria crossed the electoral threshold of 4%. Government formation was expected to be very difficult and take a long time as both the SPÖ and the ÖVP had to assess and analyze their losses and decide on a course of action. The primary motive for the people who voted for the far right parties was dissatisfaction with the governing parties, which was summarised by Der Standard as "angry voters voting for angry parties". Josef Pröll gained the most state preference votes (59,583 on the Lower Austrian candidate list), with Faymann gaining 6,236 in Vienna and Strache 6,009 (also in Vienna). Strache also gained the most regional constituency preference votes (24,301), followed by Haider with 15,836 and SPÖ trade unionist Josef Muchitsch with 9,998.

The SPÖ lost many voters to the FPÖ, while the ÖVP lost many voters to the BZÖ. The Greens lost a few voters to the LIF, and all three parties lost voters to the non-voters. Neither the SPÖ nor the FPÖ changed their positions after the election; the SPÖ reiterated it would never enter into a coalition with the FPÖ and the BZÖ, while the FPÖ did not waver in its stance of opposition to reunification with the BZÖ, although it toned down its rhetoric and stated it was open to closer cooperation. Nonetheless, many FPÖ voters and party members were reportedly strongly in favour of reunification; it was expected that Strache would have to reconsider his opposition to reunification in the months following the election. The CDU–CSU model proposed by some before the elections seemed to be off the table, as the BZÖ had strongly increased its share of the vote outside Carinthia, as well; on the other hand, the FPÖ had an increased incentive to reach such a cooperation, as it would free up BZÖ voters for the FPÖ outside Carinthia. On 6 October 2008, Haider stated he was against a reunification, as the two parties had developed into different directions and could gain more votes separately than reunified.

Analysts expected Molterer to step down, with the ÖVP taking a pivotal role in the coalition negotiations; under Josef Pröll, it was expected to take part in a renewed grand coalition, trying to win back the voters' confidence, while under another new chairman, it was considered possible the ÖVP could form a right-wing coalition with the FPÖ and the BZÖ. Johannes Hahn and Maria Fekter had been mentioned as possible alternatives to Molterer; a party leadership meeting was held on 29 September 2008. As expected by many, Molterer stepped down and Pröll became acting party chairman, and ÖVP secretary-general Missethon and many other prominent politicians from the Schüssel/Molterer era were also expected to be replaced. Pröll was to become party chairman at a party convention set for 28 November 2008 in Wels. As expected, Pröll was approved as party leader with 89.6% of the votes (the worst result in the history of ÖVP in leadership elections without an opposing candidate); Lower Austrian state secretary Johanna Mikl-Leitner, Tyrolean governor and former interior minister Günther Platter, interior minister Maria Fekter and new chief of the parliamentary party (replacing Pröll) Karlheinz Kopf were elected as deputy leaders. Economy minister Bartenstein and former chancellor Schüssel became backbenchers, as they stated they would take up their seats in parliament but were not going to be elected or appointed to any important position. Pröll announced he would replace Schüssel as chairman of the ÖVP parliamentary group. ÖVP ministers Kdolsky (health) and Plassnik (foreign affairs) were also considered certain to leave politics; they were reportedly looking to work in the World Health Organization and Austrian ambassador to the United States, respectively. Social minister Buchinger from the SPÖ was assumed to be out of federal politics, as well, as he was seen as certain to be replaced by a trade unionist (Csörgits or Kuntzl, as mentioned before the election).

Apart from a renewed grand coalition, some members of the SPÖ, the ÖVP and the Greens floated the possibilities of an SPÖ–ÖVP–Greens coalition (also called "Kenya coalition", referring to the party colours and the colours of the flag of Kenya), having the Greens act as a mediator between the two big parties. A right-wing ÖVP–FPÖ–BZÖ coalition, an SPÖ minority government, an SPÖ–FPÖ coalition, an SPÖ–BZÖ–Greens or an ÖVP–BZÖ–Greens coalition were also seen as possibilities, although unlikely ones. The FPÖ and the BZÖ explicitly declared they were not willing to offer their support to an SPÖ minority government.

The Greens held a party leadership meeting on 30 September 2008; despite the slight losses the Greens suffered, Van der Bellen did not step down, as he was nonetheless regarded as enjoying strong support from both party members and voters; the Greens did not rule out a Kenya coalition or supporting a minority government under some circumstances. It was expected that Van der Bellen would step down at a later date. Van der Bellen resigned on 3 October 2008 and was provisionally replaced by Eva Glawischnig, who had long been considered his designated successor; she was confirmed as federal spokeswoman at the party congress on 17 January, and 18 January 2009 in Klagenfurt with 97.4% of the delegates' votes, the best result for a spokesperson of the Greens so far and also an unexpectedly decisive result; she had stated she was hoping for "more than 80%". Van der Bellen said he would remain an MP. Van der Bellen's resignation came as a surprise, as he was assumed to continue as federal spokesman for a few more months before resigning. Glawischnig was also unanimously selected as chief of the Greens' parliamentary club on 24 October 2008.

The SPÖ and the FPÖ also held party leadership meetings on 30 September 2008. The FPÖ rejected conducting secret negotiations with either the SPÖ or the ÖVP, calling on both parties to declare openly if they wanted to have them as a coalition partner; Strache stated, however, that he would set strict coalition conditions, including holding referendums on the accession of Turkey to the European Union and the Treaty of Lisbon and restricting social benefits to Austrian citizens, which made coalitions with either the SPÖ or the ÖVP highly unlikely. Faymann stated that he was not interested in a Kenya coalition, as a coalition with three partners was only likely to be more difficult to manage than one with two partners. Pröll declared his opposition to both a Kenya coalition and a right-wing coalition with the FPÖ and the BZÖ, leaving the ÖVP with only the possibilities of a grand coalition or the opposition; the party membership was largely undecided between the two options. On 2 October 2008, a conflict arose between the SPÖ and the ÖVP regarding referendums on future EU treaties, as the SPÖ wanted to at least not rule out the possibility in a coalition agreement, which the ÖVP refused to accept under any circumstances.

The FPÖ won back the post of third president of the National Council from the Greens. Three people were primarily mentioned as likely to replace Eva Glawischnig in that position: education spokesman Martin Graf, justice spokesman Peter Fichtenbauer and Lower Austrian FPÖ leader Barbara Rosenkranz. Graf was nominated on 30 September 2008. While the Greens stated they opposed Graf's nomination because of Graf's position as chairman of the nationalist Burschenschaft Olympia, the other parties initially stated they would approve his nomination. After some SPÖ MPs also voiced their reservations about Graf, presidents of the National Council Barbara Prammer (SPÖ) and Michael Spindelegger (ÖVP) stated they would seek personal talks with Graf before his nomination. After Graf refused to renounce his membership in Olympia, the Greens announced they would propose Van der Bellen as an alternative to Graf. The SPÖ announced its MPs would be free to vote for or against Graf, while the ÖVP stated it would support Graf as the third-placed party by tradition had the right to nominate whomever they wished; it was expected that Graf would be elected with the votes of the ÖVP, the FPÖ and the BZÖ. Graf was elected on 28 October 2008 with 109 votes to Van der Bellen's 27.

All parties except for the ÖVP supported making the appointment of a committee of inquiry a parliamentary minority right; as the ÖVP had fewer than a third of the MPs, it was technically possible for the other four parties to outvote it on amending parliamentary law, but it was unclear whether the other parties wanted to set a precedent by using this option. The ÖVP later announced that it was willing to agree to this change, if committees of inquiry were reformed in general.

Both Schmidt and Haselsteiner declared that their political activities were completely over. Nonetheless, many party members and supporters called for the LIF to continue its work. A party convention was held on 25 October 2008 to start a renewal process and relaunch the party. Werner Becher was elected as the LIF's new leader, although he described his position as a primus inter pares. The LIF announced it would launch a reform process, renew its party program and start to build up strong local party organisations in the cities and the states. At the next regular party convention in April 2009, the party would then approve the changes (and likely change its name, as well; "The Liberals" (Die Liberalen) was considered the most likely new name), finalising the relaunch as a liberal party putting more emphasis on economic liberalism as well as social liberalism.

=== Haider's death ===
BZÖ leader and Carinthian governor Jörg Haider died in a car accident in Köttmannsdorf near Klagenfurt in the state of Carinthia in the early hours of 11 October 2008. Police reported that the Volkswagen Phaeton that Haider had been driving came off the road, rolled down an embankment and overturned, causing him "severe head and chest injuries". Haider, who was on his way to a family gathering in honour of his mother's 90th birthday, was alone in the government car and no other vehicles were involved. An initial investigation uncovered no signs of foul play, but police stated Haider was going at 142 km/h, more than double the 70 km/h allowed at the location of the accident, and it later emerged that Haider had had a blood alcohol concentration of 0.18 per cent. Countless leading Austrian politicians and former politicians from all parties expressed their condolences. Deputy governor Gerhard Dörfler (also from the BZÖ) took over as acting governor of Carinthia and was then nominated to become governor in his own right on 13 October 2008, while BZÖ general-secretary Stefan Petzner was selected as interim BZÖ leader on 12 October 2008. Haider's funeral was held on 18 October 2008 with much international attention and coverage. After the well-received speech of Haider's widow, Claudia Haider, at the funeral, there were rumours that she might become the BZÖ's candidate for governor in Carinthia in the 2009 state election instead. The vote on who would become governor until the election was to be held on 23 October 2008; the SPÖ nominated Carinthian leader Reinhart Rohr. The Greens announced they would definitely not support Dörfler, while the ÖVP was in negotiations with both the BZÖ and the SPÖ regarding whom they would support. Dörfler was elected with 19 votes to Rohr's 17; Rohr got 14 SPÖ votes, 2 Green votes and 1 BZÖ vote, while Dörfler received 14 BZÖ votes (all but one), 4 ÖVP votes and 1 FPÖ vote. Uwe Scheuch was elected as Carinthian BZÖ leader at the Carinthian BZÖ party convention on 15 November 2008 with 96.2% of the votes.

There were rumours that Haider's death would facilitate the reunification of the FPÖ and the BZÖ, enabling Strache to make a bid for power. Lothar Höbelt, a historian known to be close to the "third camp", stated that the BZÖ would be unlikely to survive without Haider and that the ÖVP could possibly gain back voters from the BZÖ if they played their cards right and forged a right-wing coalition; in the case of a renewed grand coalition, Höbelt expected most BZÖ voters to go to the FPÖ.

Following a series of highly emotional and unprofessional interviews by Petzner (some of which were seen as alluding to a personal relationship between Haider and Petzner beyond mere friendship), there were rumours that he would not become leader of the parliamentary BZÖ group on 22 October 2008 and that Haider's sister and former social minister Ursula Haubner or former defence minister Herbert Scheibner might be selected instead. These rumours were immediately denied by senior BZÖ officials, including Haubner and Scheibner. Carinthian BZÖ MP Josef Bucher, the BZÖ's finance speaker, was selected to become leader of the parliamentary group on 22 October 2008; Petzner stated he himself had proposed this alternative and lauded Bucher's credentials. Doubts over whether Petzner would even stand for party leadership at the next party convention grew in the following days amid rumours that Petzner was becoming increasingly isolated within the BZÖ. Petzner personally stated on 30 October 2008 that it was not yet set in stone that he would stand for party leadership at the next party convention, which would be held after the Carinthian state election on 1 March 2009. The date for the convention was later set for 26 April 2009.

Petzner resigned as interim BZÖ leader on 19 November 2008; there were rumours that the party considered him unfit for the office due to his emotional interviews, but Petzner rejected these claims. Former defence minister Herbert Scheibner took over as interim BZÖ leader, but stated that he would not stand for the post at the party conference in April 2009. Carinthian BZÖ leader Uwe Scheuch and leader of the parliamentary group Josef Bucher were seen as the most likely candidates. Petzner provoked further controversy on 20 November 2008 when he criticised the BZÖ's election campaign and talked about internal campaign details. Scheibner later stated that he would prefer to unite the offices of party leader and leader of the parliamentary group again and suggested Bucher as a candidate; Bucher, on the other hand, preferred to keep the offices separate and proposed that Scheibner remain party leader. On 9 January 2009, disgraced former FPÖ official Reinhart Gaugg (infamous both for his driving under the influence incident and for explaining "NAZI" to be an acronym of positive adjectives) became the first politician to announce his intention to run for BZÖ leader, even though he is not a BZÖ member.

In the week before the party congress, it was rumoured that Styrian party leader Gerald Grosz was also interested in becoming party leader; Scheuch was seen as the most likely candidate, assuming he would run. Scheibner and Gaugg were not seen as likely to even stand for the post. On 16 April 2009, it was announced that Bucher would become party leader, after Scheuch declined to take the position and proposed Bucher instead. As expected, Bucher was elected with 99.4% of the vote.

=== Government formation ===
President Heinz Fischer gave Werner Faymann the mandate to form a government on 8 October 2008.

The government of Werner Faymann was sworn in on 2 December 2008. Following the resignation of Vice Chancellor and ÖVP party chairman Josef Pröll from all political functions, a cabinet reshuffle took place, the new government members sworn in by the President of Austria on 21 April 2011.
