= Hans Peter Haselsteiner =

Austrian politician (born 1944)

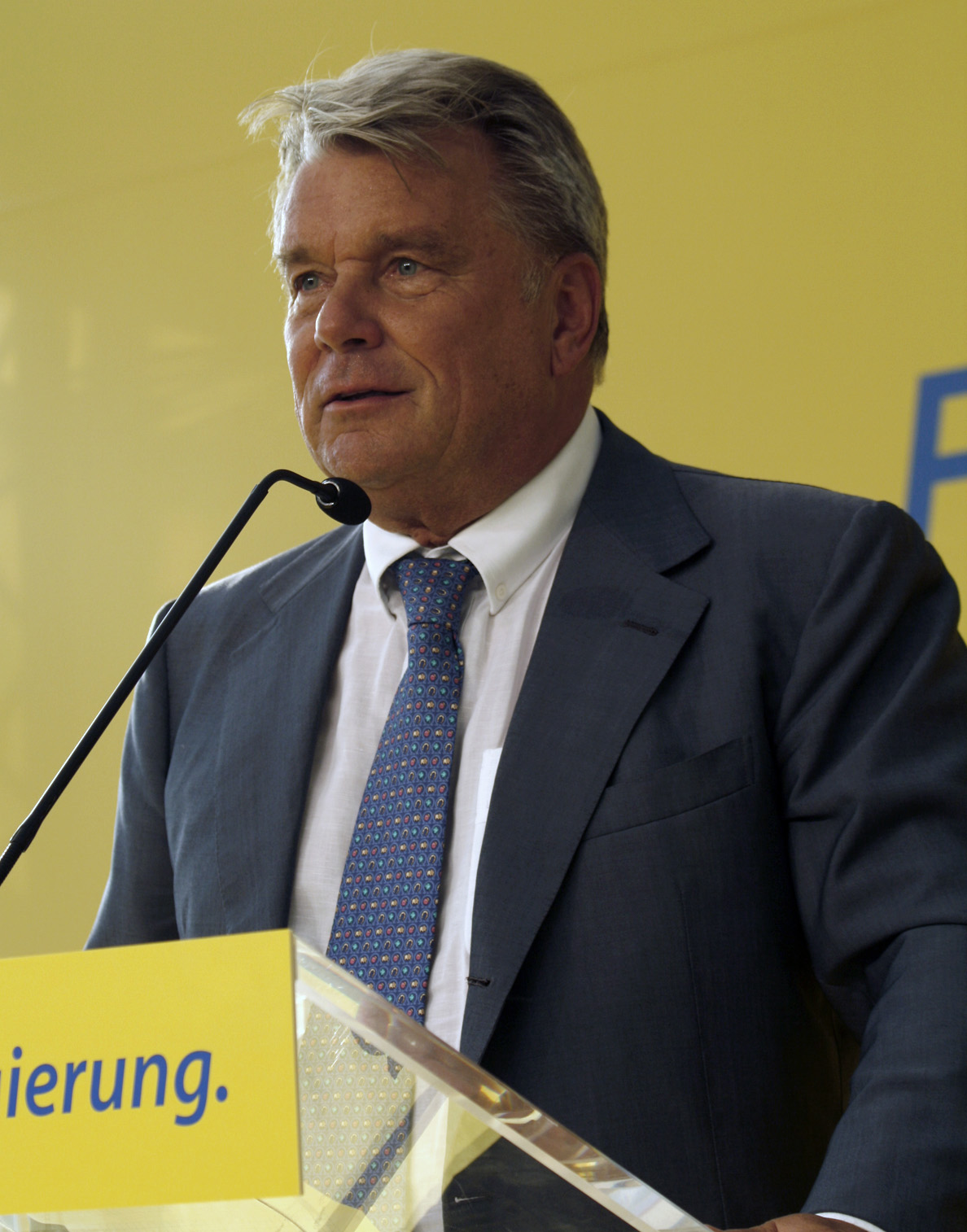
- Hans Peter Haselsteiner in 2008
- Born: 1 February 1944 (age 82)
- Education: Vienna University of Economics and Business
- Occupation: Industrialist

Hans Peter Haselsteiner (born 1 February 1944, in Wörgl) is an Austrian industrialist and former politician.

== Education ==
After his Matura, Hans Peter Haselsteiner studied business economics at the Vienna University of Economics and Business, from where he graduated in 1970.

== Industrial background ==
After working some time as an accountant, he joined his father-in-law's contracting business, Isola & Lerchbaumer (later Ilbau) in 1972. Through a series of takeovers, he expanded the company, now known as Strabag, into an international concern, which he controls through the holding company FIMAG (Finanz Industrie Management AG), of which he is the majority shareholder.

- At the beginning of the 70's, he became chairman of Ilbau AG
- In 1998, he became chairman of Bau Holding.
- In 2006 he became chairman of Strabag SE.
- Haselsteiner is shareholder and director of the Rail Holding AG, which operates the Westbahn train, a passenger train competing with ÖBB.

June 2012, Haselsteiner announced he would resign his executive position in Strabag in June 2014.

== Political involvement ==
Hans Peter Haselsteiner was an MP in the Nationalrat from 1994 to 1998, under the banner of the Liberal Forum (LiF), of which he became club vice-chairman in 1996. Other positions included:

- "Kammerrat" (consellor) of the Austrian Federal Chamber of technical Economics
- member of the Austrian association of the Building industry since 1994 (chairman since 2002).

During the Austrian legislative elections in September 2008, Haselsteiner was responsible for finance for the Lif. He was also chairman of the support committee to the party leader Heide Schmidt, who was chosen after the resignation of Alexander Zach five days before the election. The poll was lost, and Schmidt and Haselsteiner retired from political activity later that year, announcing the failure of the LiF project.

In the 2013 parliamentary elections, he supported the NEOS electoral alliance financially and as a ministerial candidate. The alliance entered the National Council, after which NEOS and LIF merged in January 2014 to form the new party Neos - Das Neue Österreich und Liberales Forum.

In 2016 he funded a campaign against FPÖ politician Norbert Hofer, who candidated for President.

He also gave financial contributions to NEOS Party in the Austrian national elections of 2017.

== Philanthropy ==
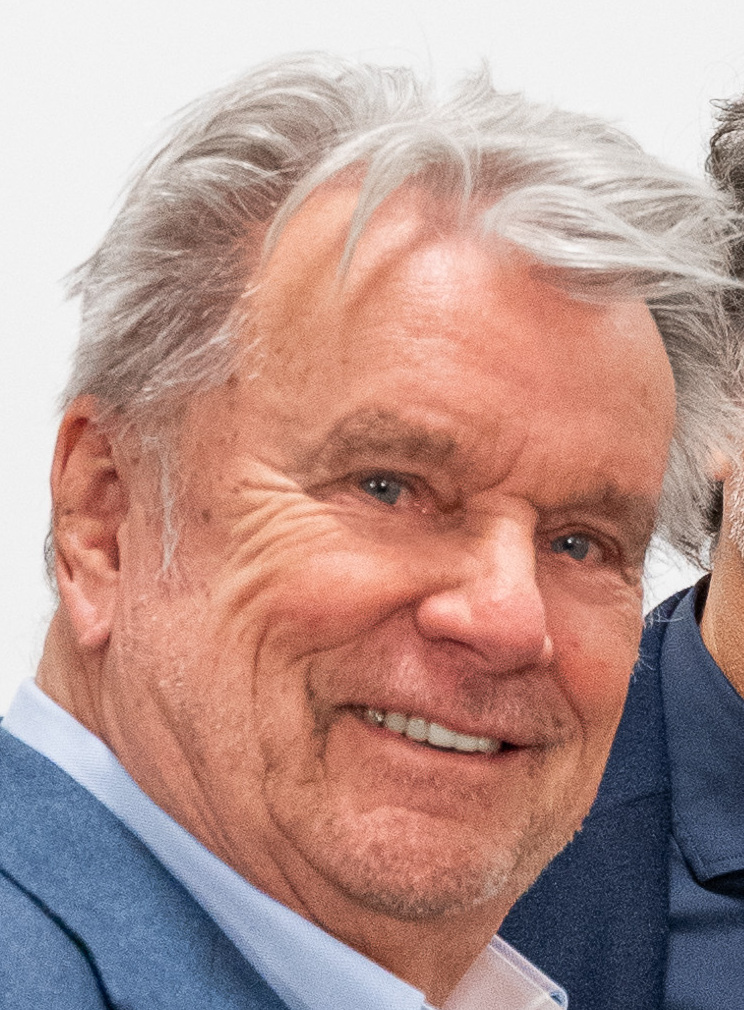
Hans Peter Haselsteiner in 2024

After the failure of the LiF, Haselsteiner supported the Institut für eine offene Gesellschaft (Institute for an open Society), founded by Heide Schmidt.

Haselsteiner is also deeply involved in helping homeless people. He promoted the construction of 16 social housing projects in Vienna.

His private foundation funds half of the budget of father Georg Sporschill's social center for elderly and needy people in Moldova (the other half is funded by the Austrian state).

In Summer 2008, he gave a substantial donation to save the refugee project of Ute Bock in Vienna.

== Helicopter crash ==
In November 2021, Haselsteiner's helicopter (a Bell 429 registered OE-XCE) crashed during landing at Wiener Neustadt East Airport. The pilot, a 50-year-old from Carinthia, was killed. Haselsteiner had disembarked the helicopter in Semmering a few minutes before the crash. The flight had originated in Bolzano, Italy.
