= 1995 Austrian legislative election =

← 1994	17 December 1995	1999 →

All 183 seats in the National Council 92 seats needed for a majority
- Turnout: 85.98% (▲4.04 pp)
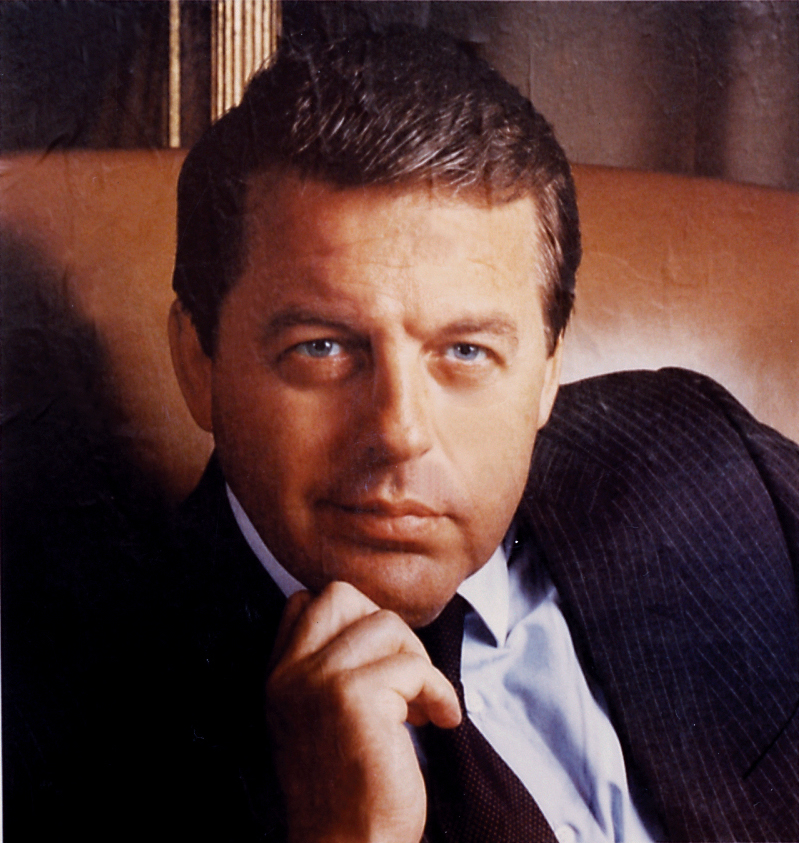

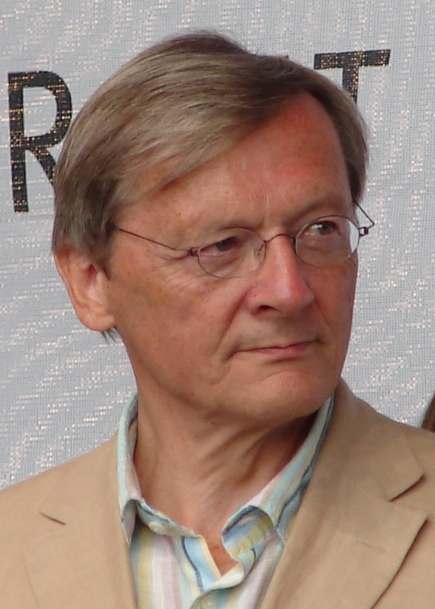

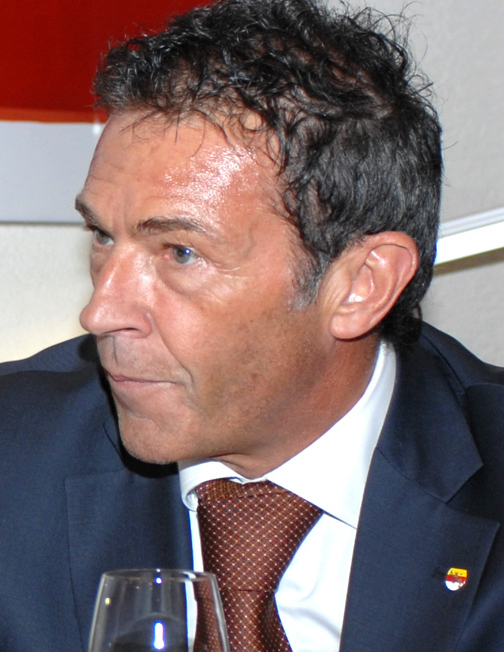

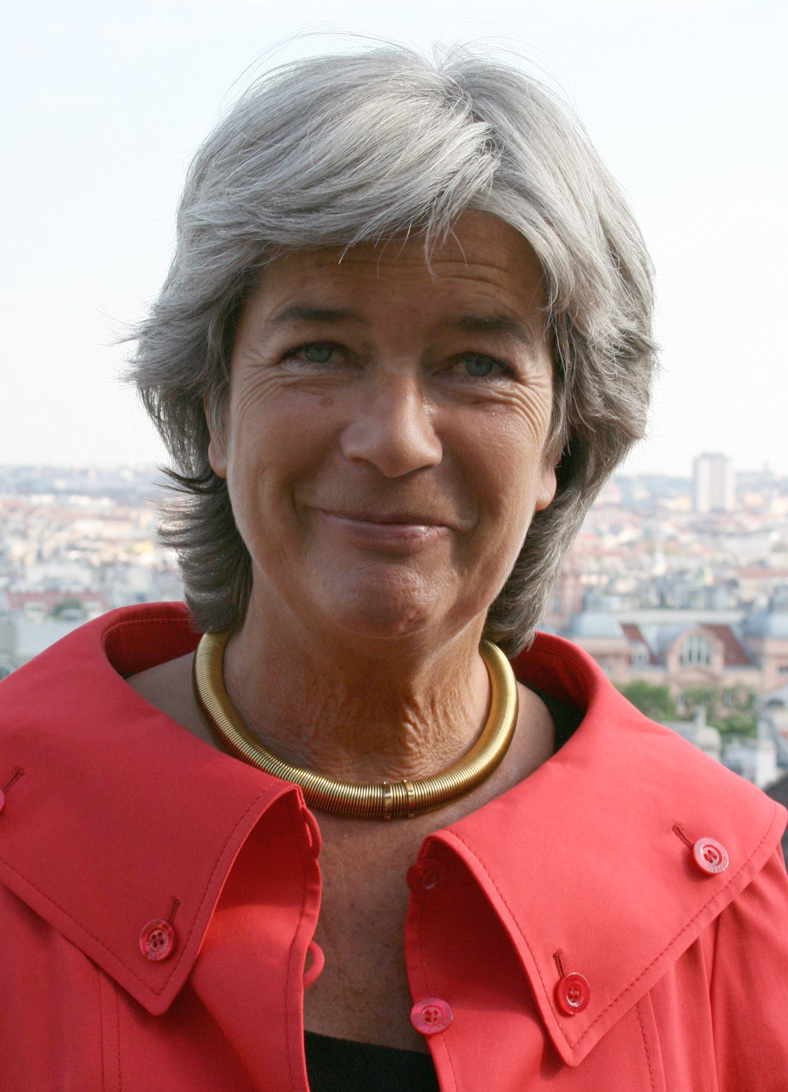

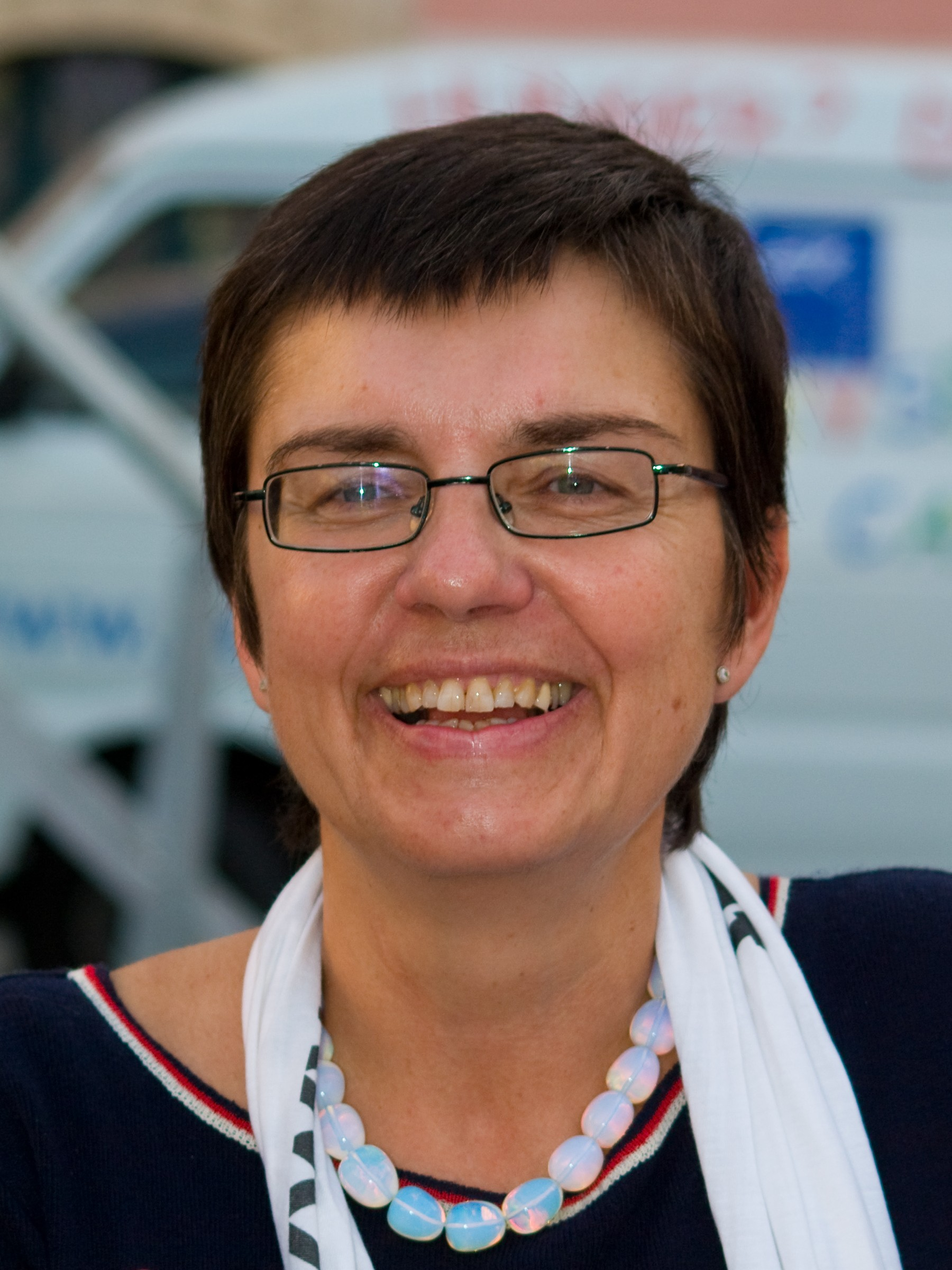
	First party	Second party	Third party
Leader	Franz Vranitzky	Wolfgang Schüssel	Jörg Haider
Party	SPÖ	ÖVP	FPÖ
Last election	34.92%, 65 seats	27.67%, 52 seats	22.50%, 42 seats
Seats won	71	52	41
Seat change	▲6	Steady	▼1
Popular vote	1,843,474	1,370,510	1,060,377
Percentage	38.06%	28.29%	21.89%
Swing	▲3.14 pp	▲0.62 pp	▼0.61 pp
	Fourth party	Fifth party
Leader	Heide Schmidt	Madeleine Petrovic
Party	LiF	Greens
Last election	5.97%, 11 seats	7.31%, 13 seats
Seats won	10	9
Seat change	▼1	▼4
Popular vote	267,026	233,208
Percentage	5.51%	4.81%
Swing	▼0.46 pp	▼2.50 pp
Chancellor before election
Franz Vranitzky
SPÖ
Elected Chancellor
Franz Vranitzky
SPÖ

Early parliamentary elections were held in Austria on 17 December 1995, following the collapse of the grand coalition between the Social Democratic Party (SPÖ) and People's Party (ÖVP) due to disagreements over the national budget. The SPÖ made small gains, primarily at the expense of minor parties, while the ÖVP remained static. The grand coalition was renegotiated, and Franz Vranitzky continued serving as Chancellor.

== Contesting parties ==
The table below lists parties represented in the 19th National Council.

Name		Ideology	Leader	1994 result	
Name		Ideology	Leader	Votes (%)	Seats
SPÖ	Social Democratic Party of Austria; Sozialdemokratische Partei Österreichs	Social democracy	Franz Vranitzky	34.9%	65 / 183
ÖVP	Austrian People's Party; Österreichische Volkspartei	Christian democracy	Wolfgang Schüssel	27.7%	52 / 183
FPÖ	Freedom Party of Austria; Freiheitliche Partei Österreichs	Right-wing populism Euroscepticism	Jörg Haider	22.5%	42 / 183
GRÜNE	The Greens; Die Grünen	Green politics	Madeleine Petrovic	7.3%	13 / 183
LiF	Liberal Forum; Liberales Forum	Liberalism	Heide Schmidt	6.0%	11 / 183

== Results ==
Party	Votes	%	Seats	+/–
Social Democratic Party of Austria	1,843,474	38.06	71	+6
Austrian People's Party	1,370,510	28.29	52	0
Freedom Party of Austria	1,060,377	21.89	41	–1
Liberal Forum	267,026	5.51	10	–1
The Greens	233,208	4.81	9	–4
No – Civic Action Group against the Sale of Austria	53,176	1.10	0	0
Communist Party of Austria	13,938	0.29	0	0
Austrian Natural Law Party	1,634	0.03	0	0
The Best Party	830	0.02	0	0
Total	4,844,173	100.00	183	0
Valid votes	4,844,173	97.68		
Invalid/blank votes	115,282	2.32		
Total votes	4,959,455	100.00		
Registered voters/turnout	5,768,099	85.98		
Source: Austrian Interior Ministry

=== Results by state ===
State	SPÖ	ÖVP	FPÖ	LiF	Grüne	Others
Burgenland	44.6	31.9	16.9	3.3	2.5	0.8
Carinthia	40.8	18.5	32.7	3.6	3.5	0.9
Lower Austria	37.9	34.5	17.3	5.0	3.7	1.6
Upper Austria	38.1	29.5	21.6	4.4	5.1	1.3
Salzburg	32.6	29.1	25.4	6.1	5.6	1.2
Styria	39.7	29.5	21.2	4.2	4.0	1.4
Tyrol	27.3	31.3	27.0	6.2	6.4	1.8
Vorarlberg	22.9	34.1	27.4	7.1	7.3	1.2
Vienna	44.0	19.5	20.1	8.6	6.0	1.8
Austria	38.1	28.3	21.9	5.5	4.8	1.4
Source: Austrian Interior Ministry
