= 1994 Austrian legislative election =

← 1990	9 October 1994	1995 →

All 183 seats in the National Council 92 seats needed for a majority
- Turnout: 81.94%
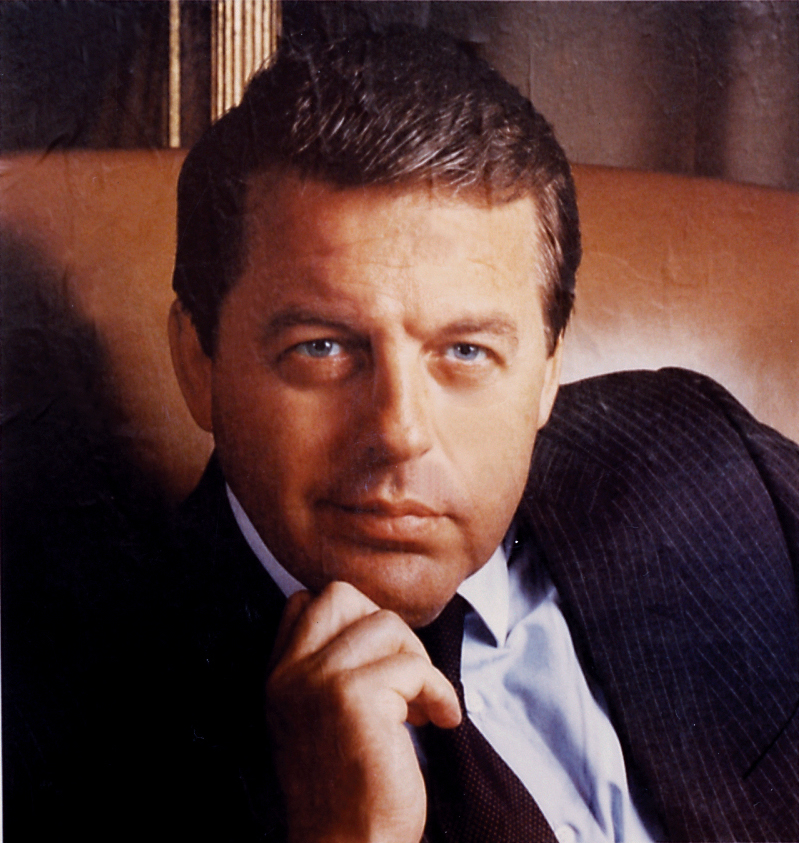

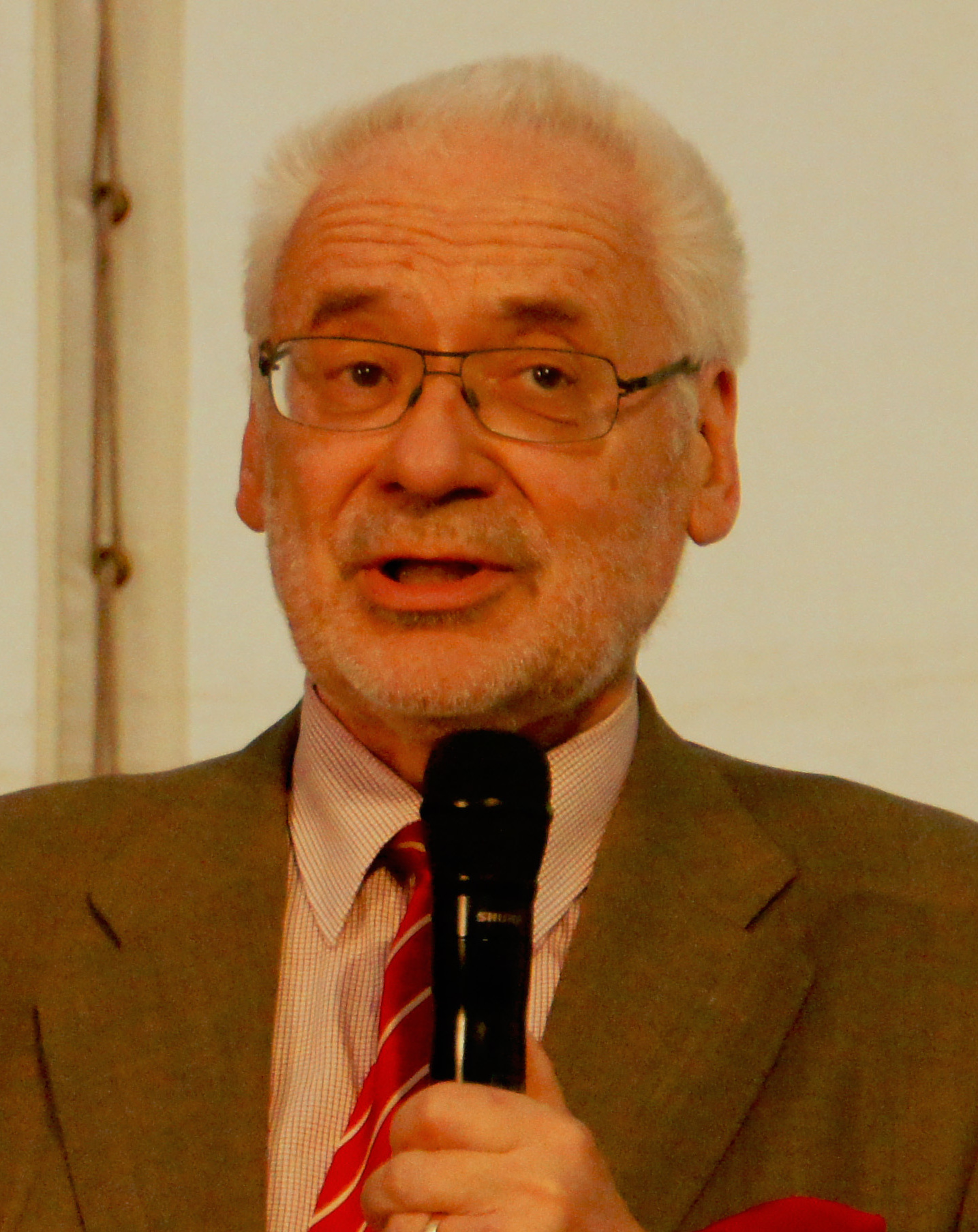

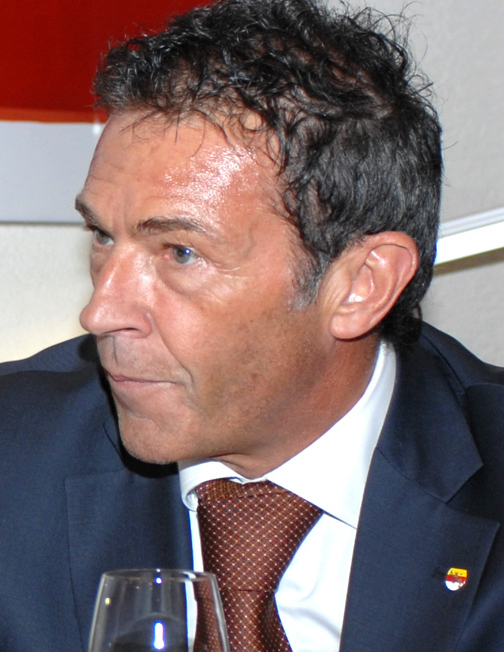

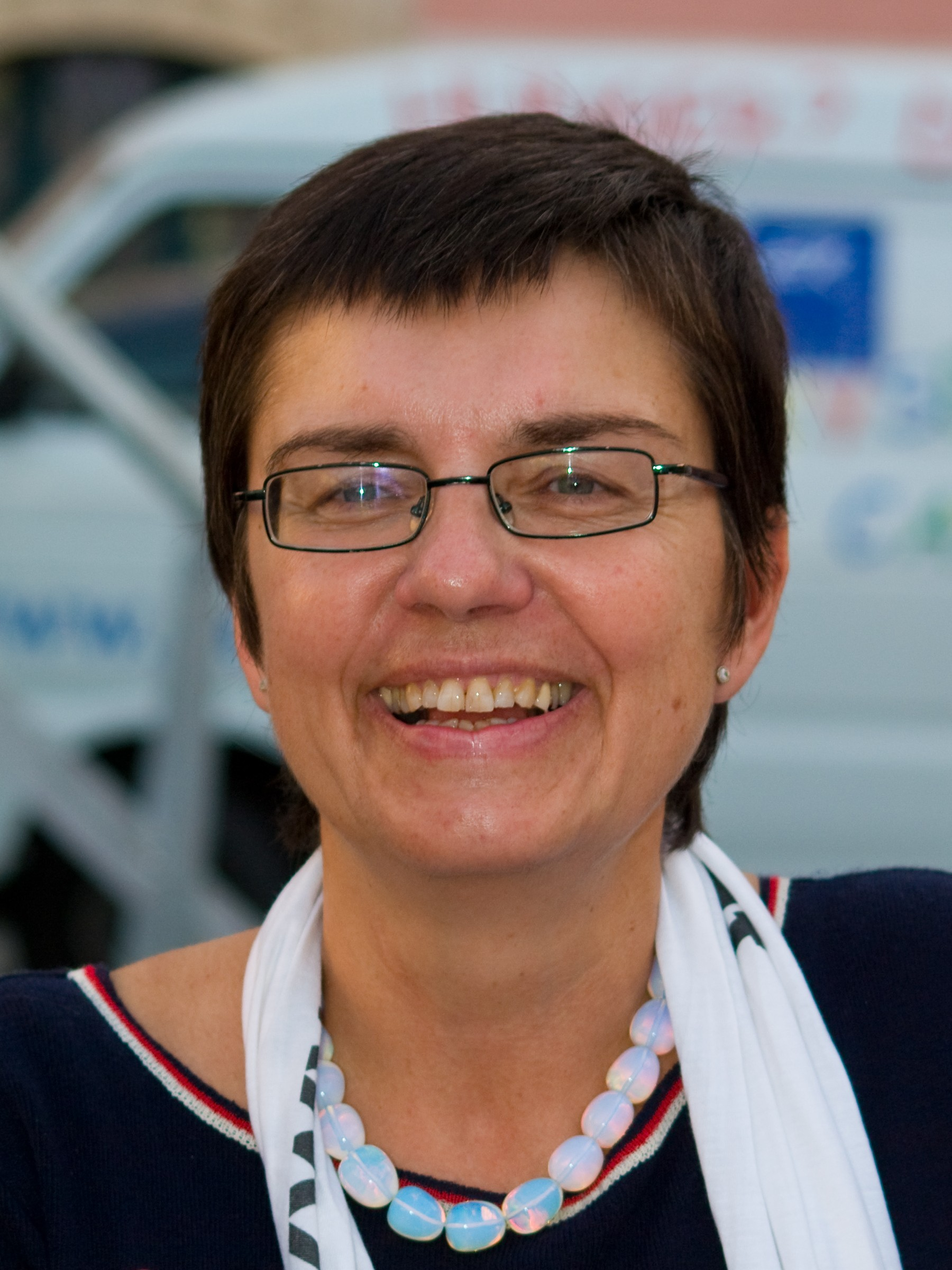

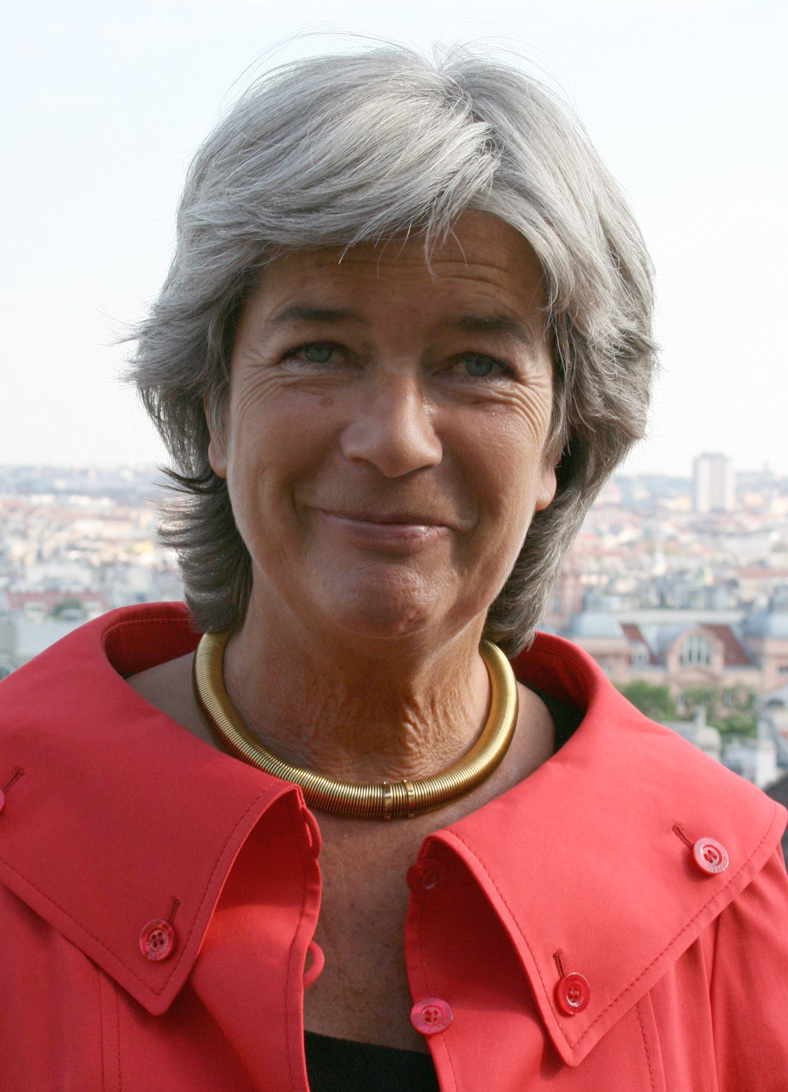
	First party	Second party	Third party
Leader	Franz Vranitzky	Erhard Busek	Jörg Haider
Party	SPÖ	ÖVP	FPÖ
Last election	42.78%, 80 seats	32.06%, 60 seats	16.63%, 33 seats
Seats won	65	52	42
Seat change	▼15	▼8	▲9
Popular vote	1,617,804	1,281,846	1,042,332
Percentage	34.92%	27.67%	22.50%
Swing	▼7.86pp	▼4.39pp	▲5.87pp
	Fourth party	Fifth party
Leader	Madeleine Petrovic	Heide Schmidt
Party	Greens	LiF
Last election	4.78%, 10 seats	–
Seats won	13	11
Seat change	▲3	New
Popular vote	338,538	276,580
Percentage	7.31%	5.97%
Swing	▲2.53pp	New
Chancellor before election
Franz Vranitzky
SPÖ
Elected Chancellor
Franz Vranitzky
SPÖ

Parliamentary elections were held in Austria on 9 October 1994. The Social Democratic Party of Austria (SPÖ) and Austrian People's Party (ÖVP) remained the largest parties, but both suffered losses to minor parties. The Freedom Party of Austria (FPÖ) improved to 22.5% and The Greens won 7.3%. The Liberal Forum, a liberal splinter from the FPÖ, won 6.0% and entered the National Council on its first attempt. The incumbent grand coalition of the SPÖ and ÖVP was renewed.

== Contesting parties ==
The table below lists parties represented in the 18th National Council.

Name		Ideology	Leader	1990 result	
Name		Ideology	Leader	Votes (%)	Seats
SPÖ	Social Democratic Party of Austria; Sozialdemokratische Partei Österreichs	Social democracy	Franz Vranitzky	42.8%	80 / 183
ÖVP	Austrian People's Party; Österreichische Volkspartei	Christian democracy	Erhard Busek	32.1%	60 / 183
FPÖ	Freedom Party of Austria; Freiheitliche Partei Österreichs	Right-wing populism Euroscepticism	Jörg Haider	16.6%	33 / 183
GRÜNE	The Greens; Die Grünen	Green politics	Madeleine Petrovic	4.8%	10 / 183

== Results ==
Party	Votes	%	Seats	+/–
Social Democratic Party of Austria	1,617,804	34.92	65	–15
Austrian People's Party	1,281,846	27.67	52	–8
Freedom Party of Austria	1,042,332	22.50	42	+9
The Greens	338,538	7.31	13	+3
Liberal Forum	276,580	5.97	11	New
No – Civic Action Group against the Sale of Austria	41,492	0.90	0	New
Communist Party of Austria	11,919	0.26	0	0
Christian Voters' Community	9,051	0.20	0	0
United Greens Austria – List Adi Pinter	5,776	0.12	0	0
Austrian Natural Law Party	4,209	0.09	0	New
Citizen Greens Austria – Free Democrats	2,504	0.05	0	New
The Best Party	581	0.01	0	New
Fritz Georg	482	0.01	0	0
Total	4,633,114	100.00	183	0
Valid votes	4,633,114	97.93		
Invalid/blank votes	97,873	2.07		
Total votes	4,730,987	100.00		
Registered voters/turnout	5,774,000	81.94		
Source: Austrian Interior Ministry

=== Results by state ===
State	SPÖ	ÖVP	FPÖ	GRÜNE	LIF	Others
Burgenland	44.3	31.5	16.7	3.8	3.0	0.7
Carinthia	39.5	16.4	33.5	5.9	3.8	1.0
Lower Austria	34.8	33.9	18.2	5.7	5.7	1.5
Upper Austria	34.5	28.9	22.5	7.6	4.7	1.8
Salzburg	31.0	29.0	23.9	8.1	6.4	1.6
Styria	36.6	27.5	23.4	6.2	4.9	1.4
Tyrol	24.4	36.2	22.1	9.5	5.3	2.4
Vorarlberg	20.9	37.8	23.6	9.0	6.5	2.3
Vienna	38.5	17.1	22.7	9.8	10.1	1.8
Austria	34.9	27.7	22.5	7.3	6.0	1.6
Source: Institute for Social Research and Consulting (SORA)
