= Save Austria =

- Leader: Karl Walter Nowak
- Founder: Karl Walter Nowak
- Founded: 2008
- Ideology: Anti-Treaty of Lisbon; Euroscepticism

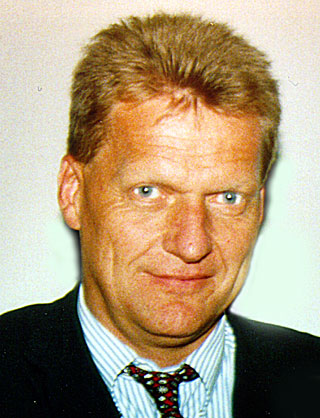
Wilfried Auerbach, the lead candidate of Save Austria for the 2008 election

Independent Citizens' Initiative Save Austria (German: Unabhängige Bürgerinitiative Rettet Österreich) or Save Austria (German: Rettet Österreich) is an inactive anti-EU movement in Austria which was founded by former presidential candidate and pro-neutrality activist Karl Walter Nowak to fight against the European Constitution and the Treaty of Lisbon. In the 2008 Austrian legislative election they received 0.73% of the vote and no seats. Their largest vote - 0.9% - was in Upper Austria.
