= Left (Austria) =

Electoral alliance in Austria (2008)

Left Linke
- Founded: 2008
- Dissolved: 2008
- Ideology: Communism; Constituent parties: Marxism–Leninism; Maoism; Trotskyism

The Leftist Electoral Alliance (German: Wahlbündnis Linke) or Left (German: Linke) was an electoral alliance of Marxist–Leninist, Maoist and Trotskyist organisations in Austria. It was formed by the Communist Initiative, the Socialist Left Party, the League of the Socialist Revolution, and other communist organisations and activists to contest the 2008 legislative election. The Communist Party of Austria was invited to participate, but it stated that the timeframe was too short and that it would stand on its own instead, while supporting the unification of the left in principle.
