= Liberal Forum =

Liberal Forum Liberales Forum
- Leader: Angelika Mlinar
- Founded: 4 February 1993
- Dissolved: 25 January 2014
- Split from: Freedom Party of Austria
- Merged into: NEOS
- Headquarters: Dürergasse 6/10 A-1060 Vienna
- Ideology: Liberalism
- Political position: Centre
- European affiliation: Alliance of Liberals and Democrats for Europe Party
- International affiliation: Liberal International
- Colours: Yellow

Website
- liberale.at

Former logo

The Liberal Forum (German: Liberales Forum, LiF) was a centrist, liberal political party in Austria. The party was active from February 1993 to January 2014, when the party merged into NEOS – The New Austria.

A member of the Liberal International and the Alliance of Liberals and Democrats for Europe Party, it was founded as a classical liberal split from the FPÖ due to its right-wing populist stances and was placed on the libertarian/post-materialist on a two-axis political spectrum, alongside The Greens – The Green Alternative, in a 2000 comparative analysis among Austrian political parties.

== Founding ==
The Liberal Forum (LiF) was founded on 4 February 1993, when liberals in the Freedom Party of Austria (FPÖ), including five members of the National Council of Austria, left the party. The five Nationalrat members were Heide Schmidt, Klara Motter, Friedhelm Frischenschlager, Hans Helmut Moser, and Thomas Barmüller. Heide Schmidt (who was third president of the Nationalrat until 1994) became the party's first chairperson.

The reason for the split within the FPÖ was growing disagreements between the liberal wing and the nationalist camp. Jörg Haider launched a petition-drive against foreign immigrants in Austria, the so-called Austria First Referendum (Österreich Zuerst Volksbegehren). This in turn was unacceptable to Heide Schmidt and her followers. The founders of the new party wanted to be a liberal party in the classical sense, which the FPÖ had ceased to be since the resignation of Norbert Steger and the rise of Haider.

LiF was the first party in the history of the Second Republic (since 1945) to achieve immediate seats in parliament without prior elections. After some initial confusion, the chairs of the house accepted the new formation as an official party, thereby granting access to public financial means of support. The FPÖ left the Liberal International and LiF took over its membership in its place. The party managed to gain 11 seats in the 1994 parliamentary elections, and with 5.51% of all votes cast 10 seats in the 1995 elections.

However, following the resignation of Schmidt as chairperson and the elections in 1999, the party's support plummeted, and it failed to gain any seats. In the elections of 3 October 1999, the party obtained 3.65% of all votes and therefore failed to surmount the 4% mandatory threshold in order to enter parliament. In the elections of 2002, it obtained 1% of the vote and got no seats. As a consequence, it also lost votes in state elections and is only represented on the communal level. In Vienna the party lost all seats on the district level in the elections of 2005.

LiF decided not to contest the 2009 European election, focusing on refounding and building up the party instead. The Young Liberals (JuLis), the LIF's student and youth organisation, contested the election independently instead.

LiF contested the 2013 legislative election in an electoral alliance with newly formed NEOS – The New Austria. On 25 January 2014, LiF merged into NEOS, which took the full name of NEOS – The New Austria and Liberal Forum.

== Ideology ==
According to its founding charter, the LiF propagated political liberalism and advocated a free market economy. Furthermore, the party wanted environmental protection and supported world peace. The party supported:

- Promotion of privatisation
- Legalisation of cannabis
- Equalisation of homosexuals
- Liberalisation of shopping hours
- Increase of the voting age

== Chairpersons since 1993 ==
The chart below shows a timeline of the Liberal chairpersons and the Chancellors of Austria. The left bar shows all the chairpersons (Bundessprecher, abbreviated as "CP") of the Liberal party, and the right bar shows the corresponding make-up of the Austrian government at that time. The red (Social Democratic Party of Austria, SPÖ) and black (Austrian People's Party, ÖVP) colours correspond to which party led the federal government (Bundesregierung, abbreviated as "Govern."). The last names of the respective chancellors are shown, the Roman numeral stands for the cabinets.

== Parliamentary election results ==
=== National Council ===
National Council of Austria
Election year	# of total votes	% of overall vote	# of seats	Government
1994	276,580 (5th)	6.00%	11 / 183	in opposition
1995	267,026 (4th)	5.51%	10 / 183	in opposition
1999	168,612 (5th)	3.59%	0 / 183	Extra-parliamentary
2002	48,083 (5th)	0.97%	0 / 183	Extra-parliamentary
2006	Contested election on SPÖ list		1 / 183	in government
2008	102,249 (6th)	2.09%	0 / 183	Extra-parliamentary
2013	Contested election on NEOS list		2 / 183	in opposition

=== European Parliament ===
European Parliament
Election year	# of total votes	% of overall vote	# of seats
1996	161,583 (5th)	4.26%	1 / 21
1999	74,467 (5th)	2.66%	0 / 21

== Notes ==
On 7 June 2005, MEP Karin Resetarits left the party of Hans-Peter Martin, following several disagreements with him. She crossed the floor and has taken her seat with the Alliance of Liberals and Democrats for Europe. Subsequently, In 2006 she also joined the Liberal Forum and represented them in the European Parliament.

In the 2006 elections, the Liberal Forum did not stand, but chairman Alexander Zach instead ran on the Social Democratic Party of Austria electoral list as an independent.

The Liberal Forum participated in the 2008 elections, its Electoral list led by the former chairperson Heide Schmidt. Shortly before the elections, there were allegations that Zach had lobbied for EADS, leading to his resignation in order to protect the party's integrity; Schmidt took over as interim leader.

== See also ==
- Liberalism in Austria
- List of liberal parties
- List of political parties in Austria
- Liberalism worldwide
- Contributions to liberal theory
