= Heide Schmidt =

Austrian politician (born 1948)

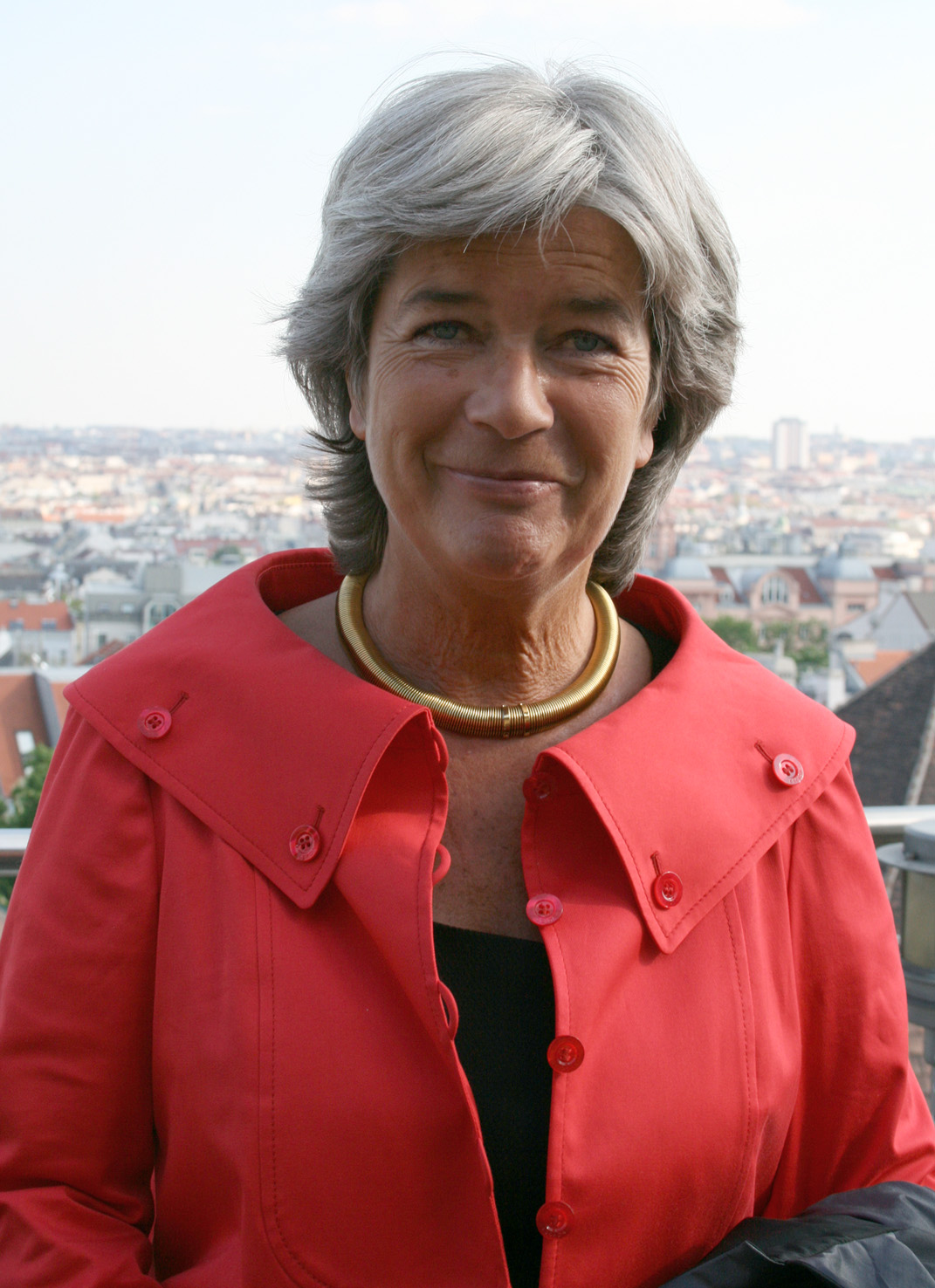
Heide Schmidt in 2008

Heide Schmidt (born 27 November 1948 in Kempten im Allgäu, Germany) is an Austrian politician.

A lawyer and formerly a prominent member of Jörg Haider's Austrian Freedom Party (FPÖ), in 1993 Schmidt was one of a group of politicians who, because of Haider's increasingly right-wing verbal politics, seceded from the FPÖ and founded the Liberal Forum.

From 1990 until 1994 Schmidt was Third President of the National Council of Austria. Also, she twice ran for Austrian Presidency both in 1992 when she was nominated by the FPÖ and in 1998 by the Liberal Forum.

Schmidt ran the non-profit organization, Institut für eine offene Gesellschaft (Institute for an Open Society) from 2000–2009.

In 2008, Schmidt staged a brief comeback as leading candidate for the Liberal Forum. Following the party's disastrous showing and failure to re-enter parliament, Schmidt announced her final retirement from politics.

| Preceded by New Creation | LiF Party Chairman; 1993–2000 | Succeeded by Christian Köck |
