= Cornelia Ecker =

Austrian politician (born 1976)

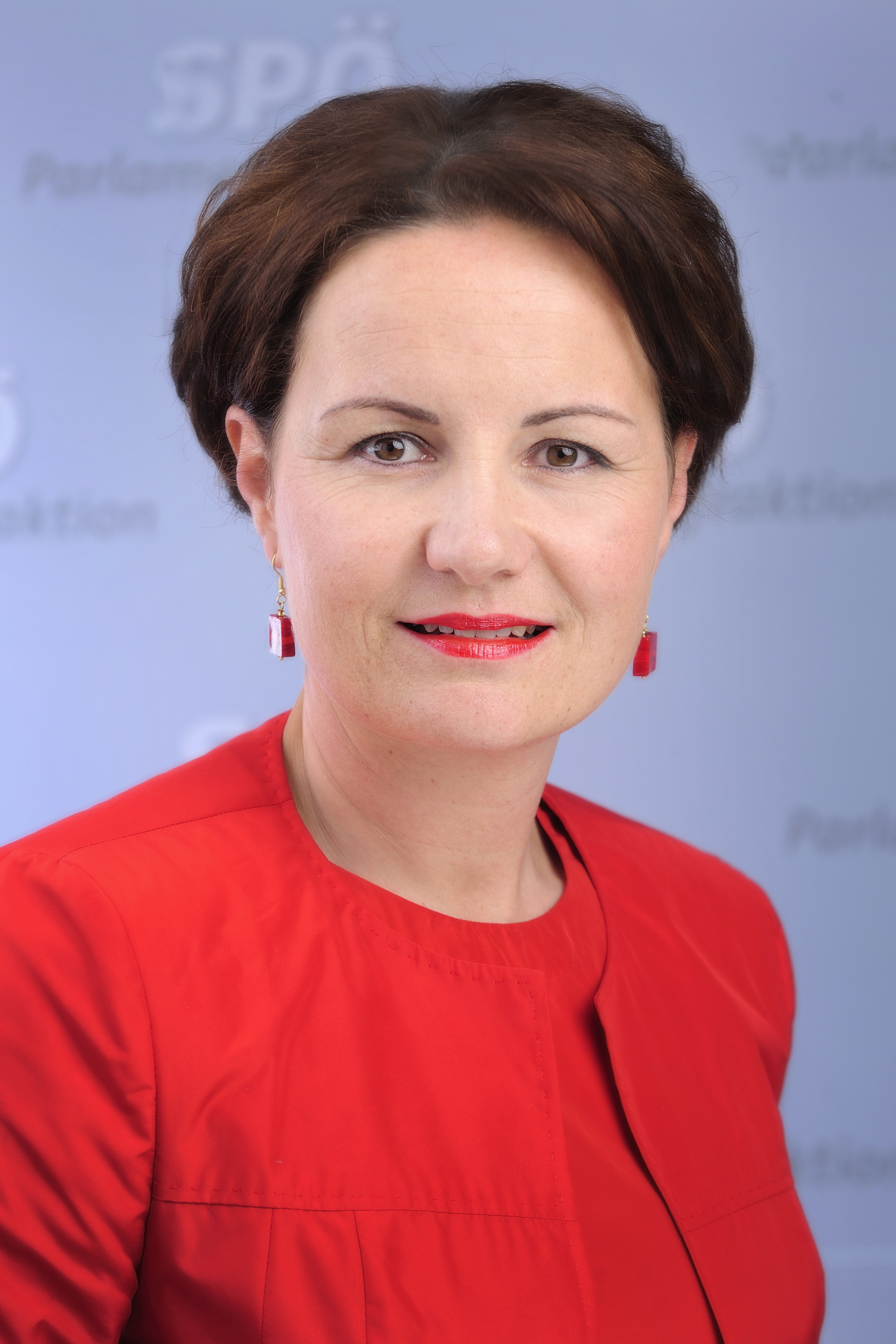
- Ecker in April 2014

Member of the National Council
- In office 29 October 2013 – 19 September 2023
- Succeeded by: Michaela Schmidt
- Constituency: Salzburg

Personal details
- Born: 27 February 1976 (age 50) Salzburg, Austria
- Party: Social Democratic Party

Cornelia Ecker (born 27 February 1976) is an Austrian politician and former member of the National Council. A member of the Social Democratic Party, she represented Salzburg from October 2013 to September 2023. She has been mayor of Bürmoos since June 2023.

Ecker was born on 27 February 1976 in Salzburg. She studied at a business academy (Handelsakademie) from 1990 to 1995. She was a travel agent for Kuoni Travel from 1996 to 1999. She has been a managing director of Biohofmetzgerei Hainz, an organic butcher's shop in Bürmoos, since 2004. She has held various positions in the Salzburg branch of the Social Democratic Party (SPÖ) since 2009. She has been a member of the municipal council in Bürmoos since 2004. She was elected to the National Council at the 2013 legislative election. She became mayor of Bürmoos in June 2023. She subsequently resigned from the National Council in September 2023 and was replaced by Michaela Schmidt.

Electoral history of Cornelia Ecker
Election	Electoral district	Party	Votes	%	Result
2013 legislative	Flachgau-Tennengau	Social Democratic Party	1,560	6.72%	Not elected
2013 legislative	Salzburg	Social Democratic Party	341	0.52%	Elected
2017 legislative	Flachgau-Tennengau	Social Democratic Party	2,625	10.23%	Not elected
2017 legislative	Salzburg	Social Democratic Party	453	0.65%	Elected
2019 legislative	Flachgau-Tennengau	Social Democratic Party	2,024	11.63%	Not elected
2019 legislative	Salzburg	Social Democratic Party	390	0.80%	Elected
