= Montello, Lombardy =

Montello Montèl (Lombard)
- Comune
- Comune di Montello
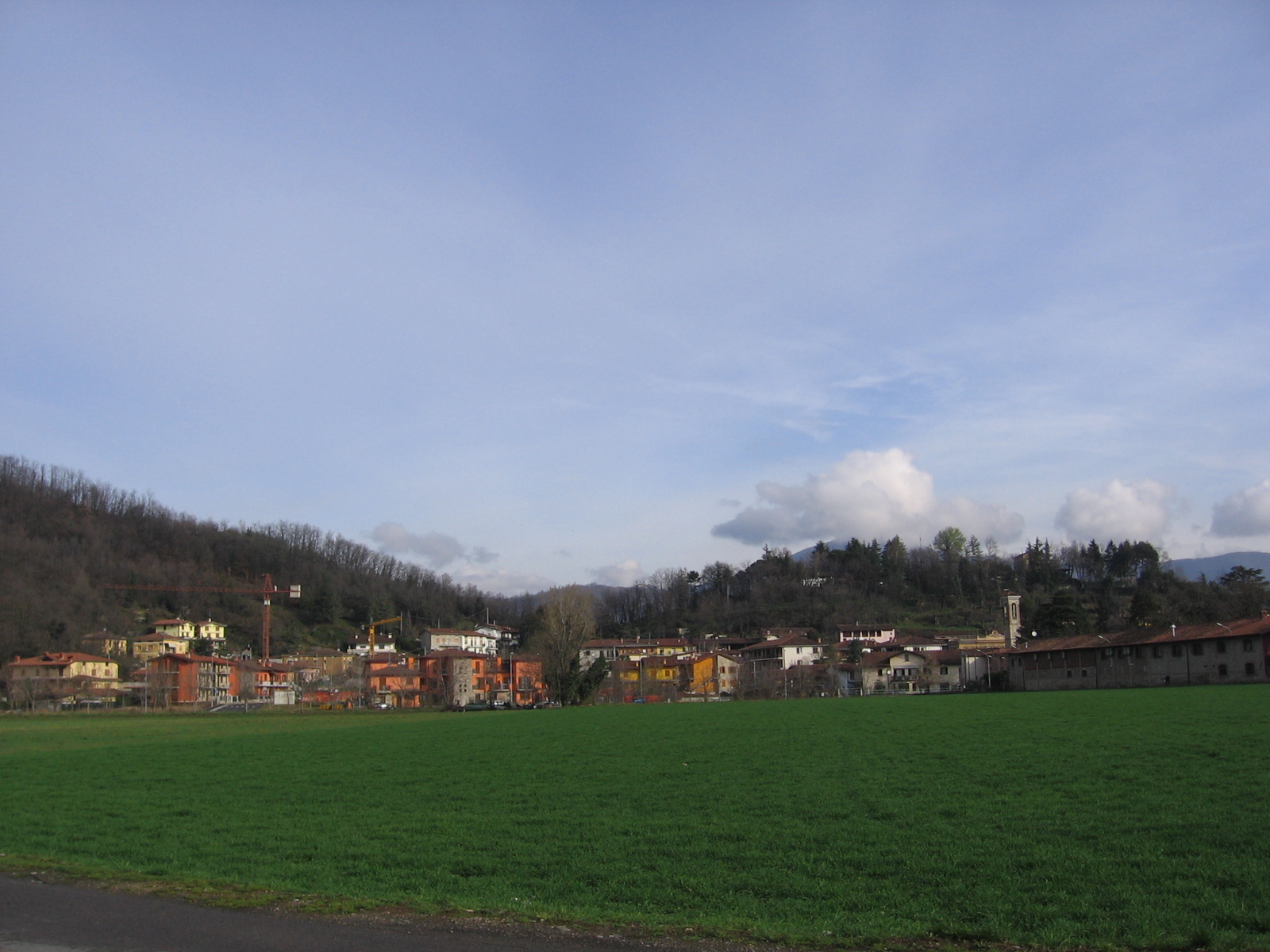
- Montello

- Location within Italy Location within Lombardy
- Coordinates: 45°40′N 9°48′E
- Country: Italy
- Region: Lombardy
- Province: Province of Bergamo (BG)

Area
  - Total: 1.7 km^{2} (0.66 sq mi)
- Elevation: 229 m (751 ft)

Population (Dec. 2004)
  - Total: 2,668
  - Density: 1,600/km^{2} (4,100/sq mi)
- Demonym: Montellesi
- Time zone: UTC+1 (CET)
  - Summer (DST): UTC+2 (CEST)
- Postal code: 24060
- Dialing code: 035

Montello (Bergamasque: Montèl) is a comune (municipality) in the Province of Bergamo in the Italian region of Lombardy, located about 50 kilometres (31 mi) northeast of Milan and about 11 kilometres (7 mi) southeast of Bergamo. As of 31 December 2004, it had a population of 2,668 and an area of 1.7 square kilometres (0.66 mi^{2}).

Montello borders the following municipalities: Albano Sant'Alessandro, Bagnatica, Costa di Mezzate, Gorlago, San Paolo d'Argon.

== Demographic evolution ==
Historical population

Year	Pop.	±%
1861	369	—
1871	413	+11.9%
1881	412	−0.2%
1901	461	+11.9%
1911	519	+12.6%

Year	Pop.	±%
1921	631	+21.6%
1931	735	+16.5%
1936	740	+0.7%
1951	1,014	+37.0%
1961	1,373	+35.4%

Year	Pop.	±%
1971	1,611	+17.3%
1981	1,924	+19.4%
1991	1,987	+3.3%
2001	2,392	+20.4%

Source: Data from ISTAT
