= Bolgare =

- Comune
- Comune di Bolgare
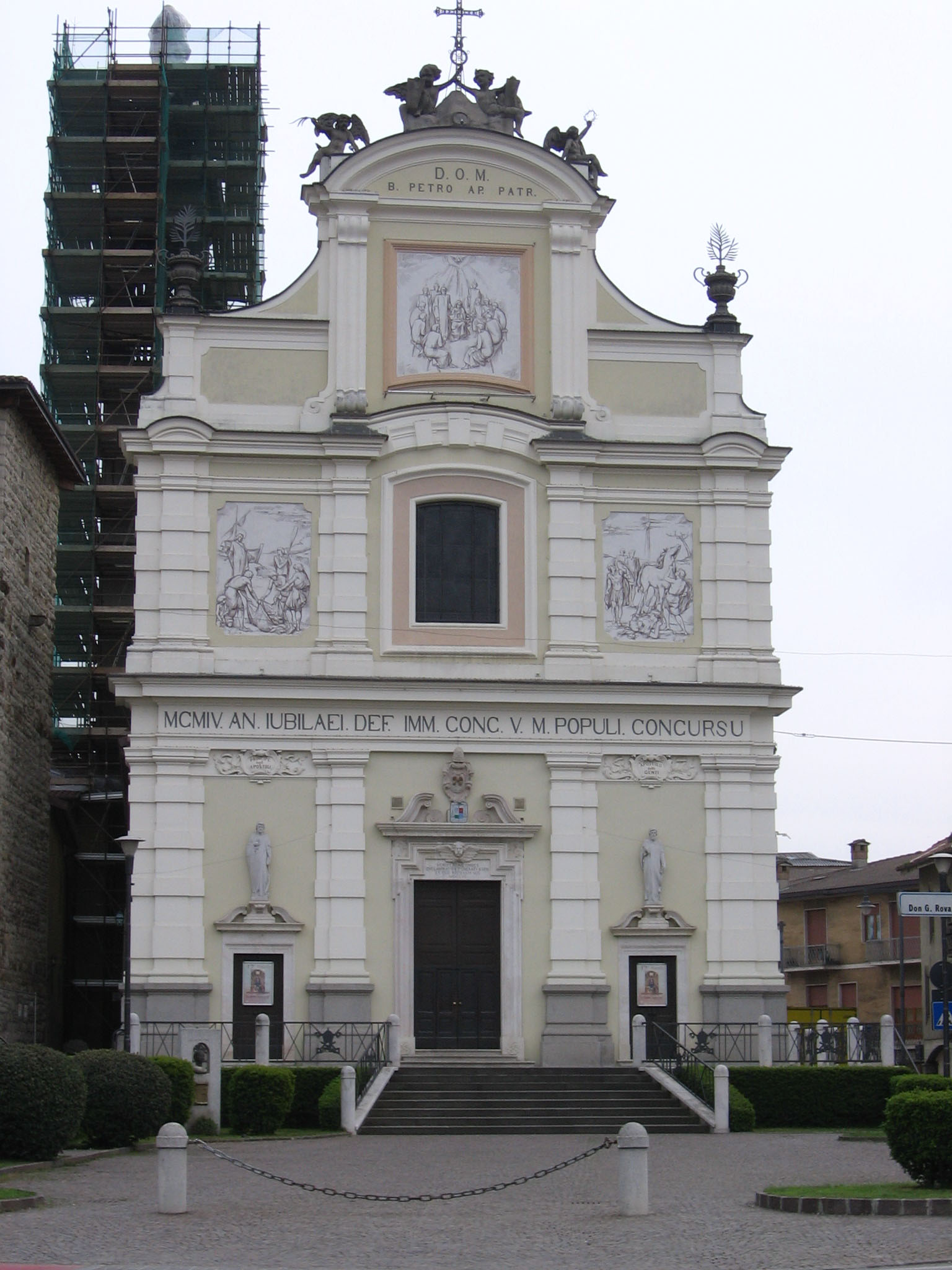
- Church in Bolgare

- Coat of arms

- Location within Italy Location within Lombardy
- Coordinates: 45°38′N 09°49′E
- Country: Italy
- Region: Lombardy
- Province: Province of Bergamo (BG)

Government
  - Mayor: Luca Serughetti

Area
  - Total: 8 km^{2} (3.1 sq mi)
- Elevation: 69 m (226 ft)

Population (2011)
  - Total: 5,848
  - Density: 730/km^{2} (1,900/sq mi)
- Demonym: Bolgaresi
- Time zone: UTC+1 (CET)
  - Summer (DST): UTC+2 (CEST)
- Postal code: 24060
- Dialing code: 035
- Patron saint: Sts. Peter and Paul

Bolgare (Bergamasque: Bólgher) is a comune in the province of Bergamo, in Lombardy, Italy. It is situated in the plain between the rivers Serio and Oglio, 13 km southeast of Bergamo.

== Bounding communes ==
- Gorlago
- Carobbio degli Angeli
- Chiuduno
- Telgate
- Grumello del Monte
- Palosco
- Calcinate
- Costa di Mezzate
