= Credaro =

- Comune
- Comune di Credaro
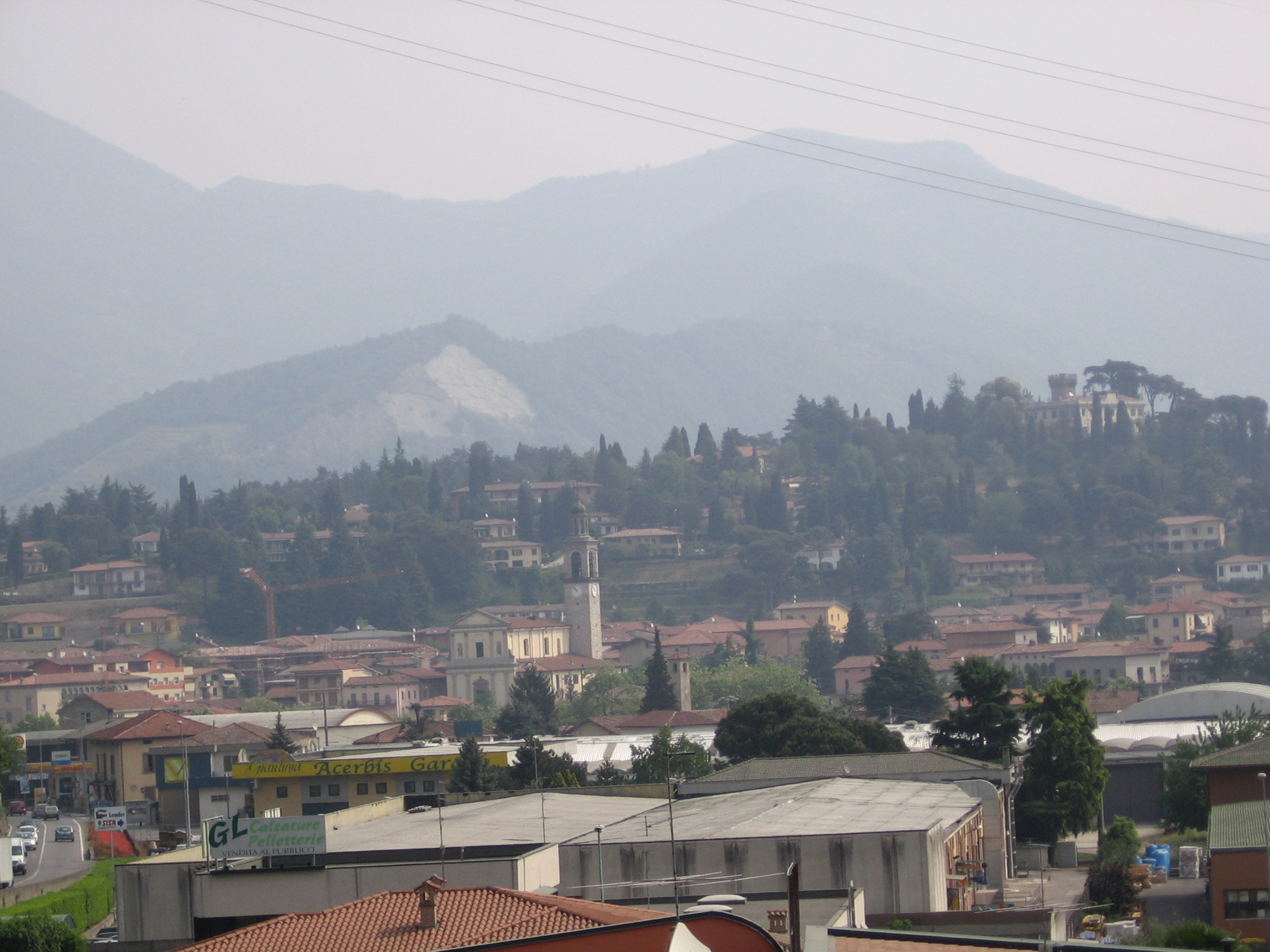
- Credaro

- Location within Italy Location within Lombardy
- Coordinates: 45°40′N 9°56′E
- Country: Italy
- Region: Lombardy
- Province: Province of Bergamo (BG)

Area
  - Total: 3.4 km^{2} (1.3 sq mi)
- Elevation: 255 m (837 ft)

Population (Dec. 2004)
  - Total: 2,608
  - Density: 770/km^{2} (2,000/sq mi)
- Demonym: Credaresi
- Time zone: UTC+1 (CET)
  - Summer (DST): UTC+2 (CEST)
- Postal code: 24060
- Dialing code: 035

Credaro (Bergamasque: Credér) is a comune (municipality) in the Province of Bergamo in the Italian region of Lombardy, located about 60 kilometres (37 mi) northeast of Milan and about 20 kilometres (12 mi) east of Bergamo. As of 31 December 2004, it had a population of 2,608 and an area of 3.4 square kilometres (1.3 mi^{2}).

Credaro borders the following municipalities: Capriolo, Castelli Calepio, Gandosso, Paratico, Trescore Balneario, Villongo, Zandobbio.

== Demographic evolution ==
Historical population

Year	Pop.	±%
1861	631	—
1871	605	−4.1%
1881	768	+26.9%
1901	893	+16.3%
1911	1,074	+20.3%

Year	Pop.	±%
1921	1,223	+13.9%
1931	1,351	+10.5%
1936	1,350	−0.1%
1951	1,474	+9.2%
1961	1,577	+7.0%

Year	Pop.	±%
1971	1,686	+6.9%
1981	1,865	+10.6%
1991	2,038	+9.3%
2001	2,297	+12.7%

Source: Data from ISTAT
