= Michaela Schmidt =

Austrian politician (born 1983)

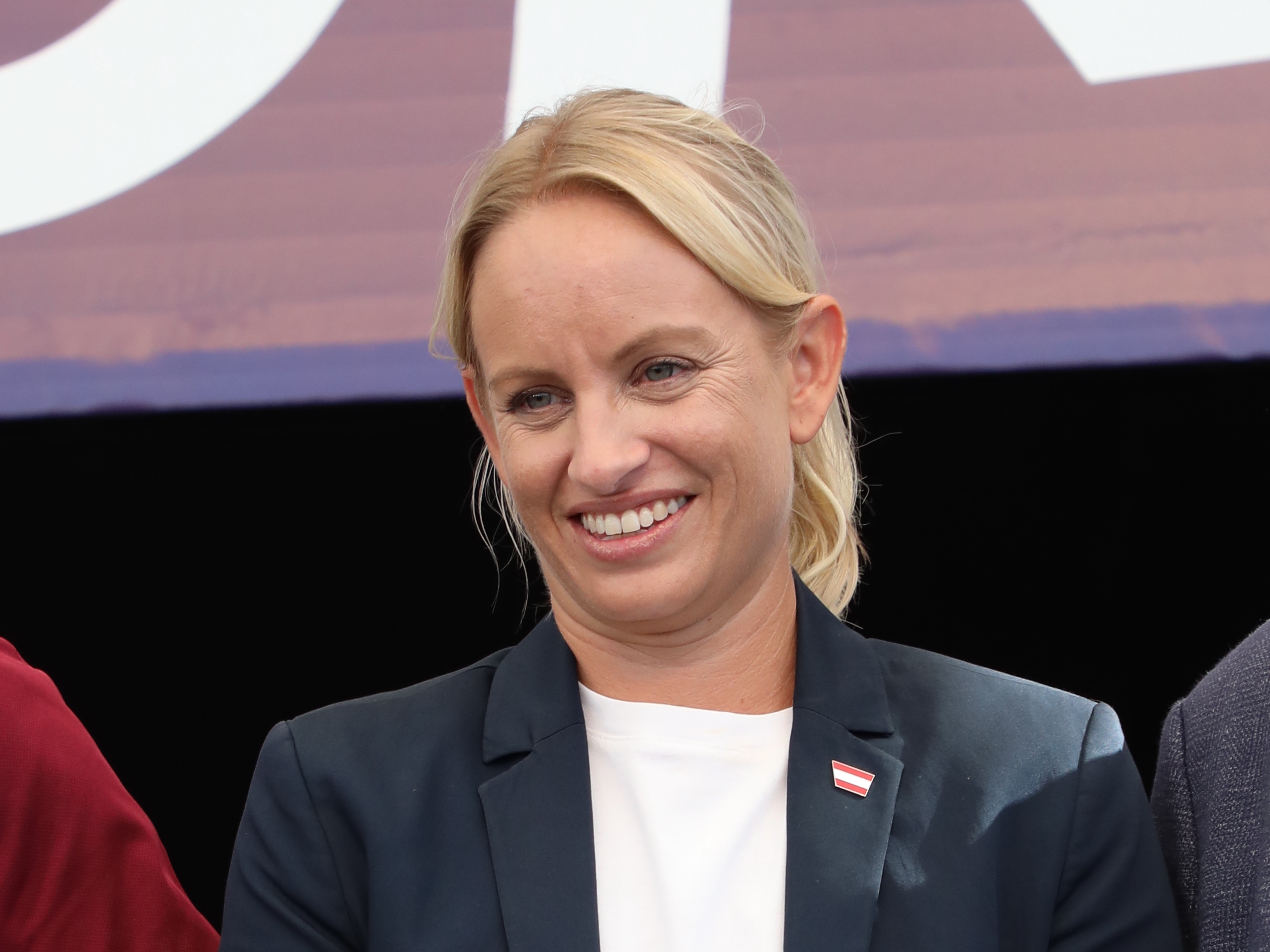
- Schmidt in 2025
- Incumbent
- Assumed office 3 March 2025

State Secretary in the Ministry for Housing, Arts, Culture, Media and Sport

Personal details
- Born: 15 October 1983 (age 42) Salzburg, Austria
- Party: Social Democratic Party

Michaela Schmidt (born 15 October 1983) is an Austrian politician of the Social Democratic Party serving as State Secretary for Sports in the Ministry for Housing, Arts, Culture, Media and Sport in the Stocker government. She also serves one of the coalition's Government Coordinators .

== Career ==
Michaela Schmidt was born in Salzburg to Gerhard Schmidt, director of the Chamber of Labour. She studied at the Christian-Doppler-Gymnasium and graduated in 2002. She studied Business Informatics and Economics at the University of Linz from 2002 to 2008, completing both studies with a Master's degree.

From 2007 to 2014, she worked at the Chamber of Labour of Upper Austria, before moving to the Chamber of Labour of Salzburg, where she took over as the head of the Economic Department in 2019.

In the 2017 National Council election, Schmidt ran as the SPÖ’s lead candidate in the Salzburg City electoral district, and she was listed third on the state electoral list for Salzburg. In 2026, she was elected as a deputy chairwoman of SPÖ Salzburg.

On September 20, 2023, she was sworn in as a member of the Austrian National Council, replacing Cornelia Ecker. In the SPÖ parliamentary group, she became the spokesperson for the United Nations Sustainable Development Goals. In October 2023, she was appointed to the SPÖ Federal Party Presidium.

For the 2024 National Council election, she was placed eighth on the SPÖ federal list and third on the SPÖ Salzburg state list. Following the election, in November 2024, she leaded SPÖ’s negotiation team in the Economy and Infrastructure group for the formation of a new government. After rumors of Schmidt becoming Minister of Finance, she was sworn in as State Secretary for Sports in the Ministry for Housing, Arts, Culture, Media and Sport, assisting Vice Chancellor Andreas Babler in March 2025.

== Personal life ==
Schmidt is married and a mother of two children. She was a player in the Austrian Fistball League and served in the presidium of Austrias Fistball Association.
