= Costa di Mezzate =

- Comune
- Comune di Costa di Mezzate
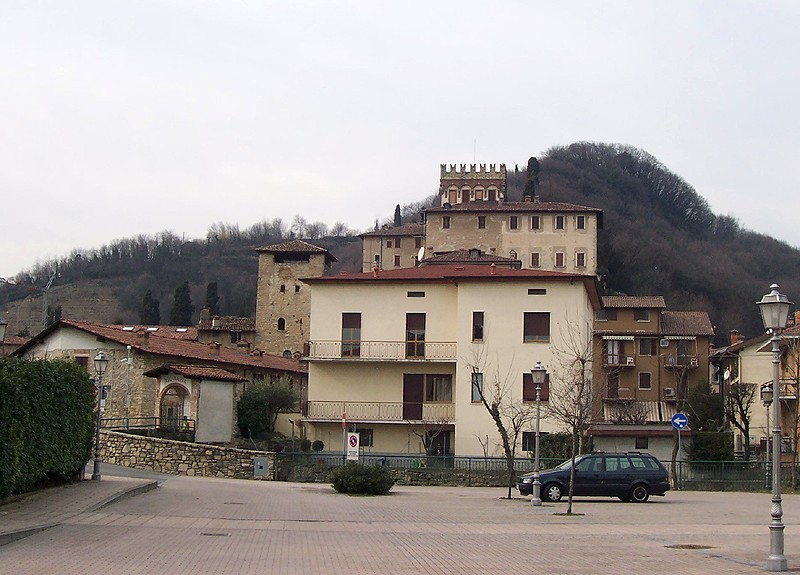
- Medieval castle

- Location within Italy Location within Lombardy
- Coordinates: 45°40′N 9°48′E
- Country: Italy
- Region: Lombardy
- Province: Bergamo (BG)

Area
  - Total: 5 km^{2} (1.9 sq mi)
- Elevation: 218 m (715 ft)

Population (2011)
  - Total: 3,383
  - Density: 680/km^{2} (1,800/sq mi)
- Demonym: Costesi
- Time zone: UTC+1 (CET)
  - Summer (DST): UTC+2 (CEST)
- Postal code: 24060
- Dialing code: 035
- ISTAT code: 016084
- Patron saint: San Giorgio
- Saint day: 23 April

Costa di Mezzate (Bergamasque: Còsta de Mesàt) is a comune in the province of Bergamo, in Lombardy, Italy. Neighbouring communes are Albano Sant'Alessandro, Bagnatica, Bolgare, Calcinate, Gorlago and Montello.
