= W&H Dentalwerk =

Austrian manufacturer of dental handpieces and turbines

W&H Dentalwerk Bürmoos GmbH
- Type: Family business
- Industry: Dental equipment
- Founded: 1890, Berlin
- Headquarters: Bürmoos, Salzburg, Austria
- Area served: World wide
- Key people: Peter Malata
- Products: Restoration & Prosthetics; Endodontics; Prophylaxis & periodontology; Oral surgery & implantology; Sterilization, hygienic & maintenance; Dental laboratory
- Number of employees: over 1000 worldwide (2017); Bürmoos 600 (2017)
- Website: www.wh.com

W&H Dentalwerk is a manufacturer of dental handpieces and turbines based in Austria.

== History ==
W&H has a history of over 120 years in the manufacture of dental products. The initials W&H refer to the Group's two founders, Jean Weber and Hugo Hampel. In 1890, these two precision engineers founded a company in Berlin for the manufacture of straight and contra-angle handpieces. The fact that the initials of the two founders are the same as the German initials of their products (Handstück and Winkelstück) was perhaps an added incentive to use the letters W&H as the central element of the company's logo.

The company was restructured several times between 1920 and 1930. W&H became part of DEGUSSA and acquired international status through its global sales network. In 1944, W&H moved from Berlin (Germany) to Bürmoos (Austria). In March 1946, the Allies installed Peter Malata to administer the company. In 1958, W&H was acquired by the family of Peter and Hilde Malata, since when it has been a family-owned concern. During the Seventies, the company began the steady rise and expansion through which it has achieved its current status as a global player. For example, W&H Germany opened in 1964, followed by branches in France, Italy, Sweden and Great Britain. Peter Malata junior has been the Group's CEO since 1996.

In March 2018, W&H announced the acquisition of Osstell AB, a Swedish medical-technology company specializing in dental implant stability measurement and the patented Implant Stability Quotient (ISQ) technology. The two companies had been cooperating since September 2016, and Osstell's ISQ module had been integrated into W&H's Implantmed surgical device prior to the acquisition. Following the acquisition, Osstell continued to operate as a W&H subsidiary in Gothenburg, Sweden, retaining its existing chief executive, Jonas Ehinger.

== Operations ==
W&H operates two production sites in Bürmoos, Austria, and one in Brusaporto, Italy, and maintains subsidiaries across Europe, Asia, and North America. As of 2018, the company employed approximately 1,100 people worldwide, with around 680 staff at the Bürmoos headquarters, and exported its products to more than 110 countries.

== Activities ==
W&H products are used in dental practices, dental clinics, dental laboratories, dental universities, hospitals and microsurgery. W&H is involved principally in B2B business. 95% of its products are exported to over 90 countries. The W&H Group employs around 980 staff worldwide, some 650 of whom work in the Austrian headquarters in Bürmoos. 30% of the Group's turnover comes from products that have come onto the market in the last three years.

W&H is a family company whose registered office is in Bürmoos, Austria.

W&H specialises in dental instruments and turbines. Its current product range includes instruments and turbines for the following fields of application: Dental restoration and prosthetics, endodontology, oral surgery and implantology, prophylaxis and parodontology, dental hygiene and care, and dental laboratory.

== Products ==
In 1895, W&H manufactured a universal handpiece with adjustable head angle, to provide optimum access to the treatment site. The first file contra-angle headpiece manufactured by W&H started in 1926, the Cursor, with a simplified mechanical root canal preparation.

W&H developed its first foot-operated drilling machine in 1939, its first portable drilling machine in 1959, its first turbine (Turbo 60) in 1960, and its first Roto Quick coupling in 1978.

1979: The first press button chuck for turbines was introduced. For the first time, it was possible to change the bur by simply pressing a button on the back of the instrument head. Up to then, this procedure had required a bur changer.

1983: In 1983, W&H developed Elcomed, the most powerful and rapid device for minor operations of its day. The motor reached a drive speed of up to 45,000 rpm. With this instrument, W&H expanded its range in the area of oral surgery.

1989: W&H presented a unique Endo contra-angle handpiece. The movements of this instrument adjusted as it performed root canal preparations. The file therefore did not move in a fixed pattern. In this way, the Endo file was better able to follow the natural shape of the root canal.

1992: W&H launched the instrument maintenance system Assistina on the market.

1995: The quietest but most powerful turbine of its day, the 898 LE (low emission), was developed. The turbine's excellent power transmission meant that the idle mode speed could be reduced to 300,000 rpm.

2001: W&H developed an implantology motor for absolute precision in dental implants.

2007: The new Synea generation included the first turbines in the history of dentistry to be fitted with sterilizable LEDs. In order to make the benefits of LED technology accessible to all dentists, at the IDS 2007, W&H also introduced surgical handpieces/contra-angles with generator technology. The electricity for the light is generated independently of the drive motor by a generator which is integrated into the instrument. The principle is similar to that of a bicycle dynamo.

== Social commitment ==
W&H has received many awards for a variety of disciplines, ranging from employee training, through employee health to its commitment to social causes. On the occasion of its 120th anniversary, W&H focused on the expansion of its commitment to social causes. Since its official anniversary year, from 6 April 2010 to 31 March 2011, W&H has been especially active in the provision of social services. In line with its corporate slogan People have Priority, W&H supports the organisation SOS Children's Villages.

W&H is offering special support to the family strengthening programme in Kakiri, Uganda, which was initiated by SOS. This support financing for the SOS programme has been guaranteed for around 3 years. The aim of the project is to help children and their families who rely on aid due to poverty and disease. Currently around 480 children from 130 families are taking part in the programme. The activities include: providing families with medical care, securing basic nutrition for them, and ensuring access to education for school-age children.
