= Madonna and Child with Saint Jerome and Saint Nicholas of Tolentino =

1523-1524 painting by Lorenzo Lotto

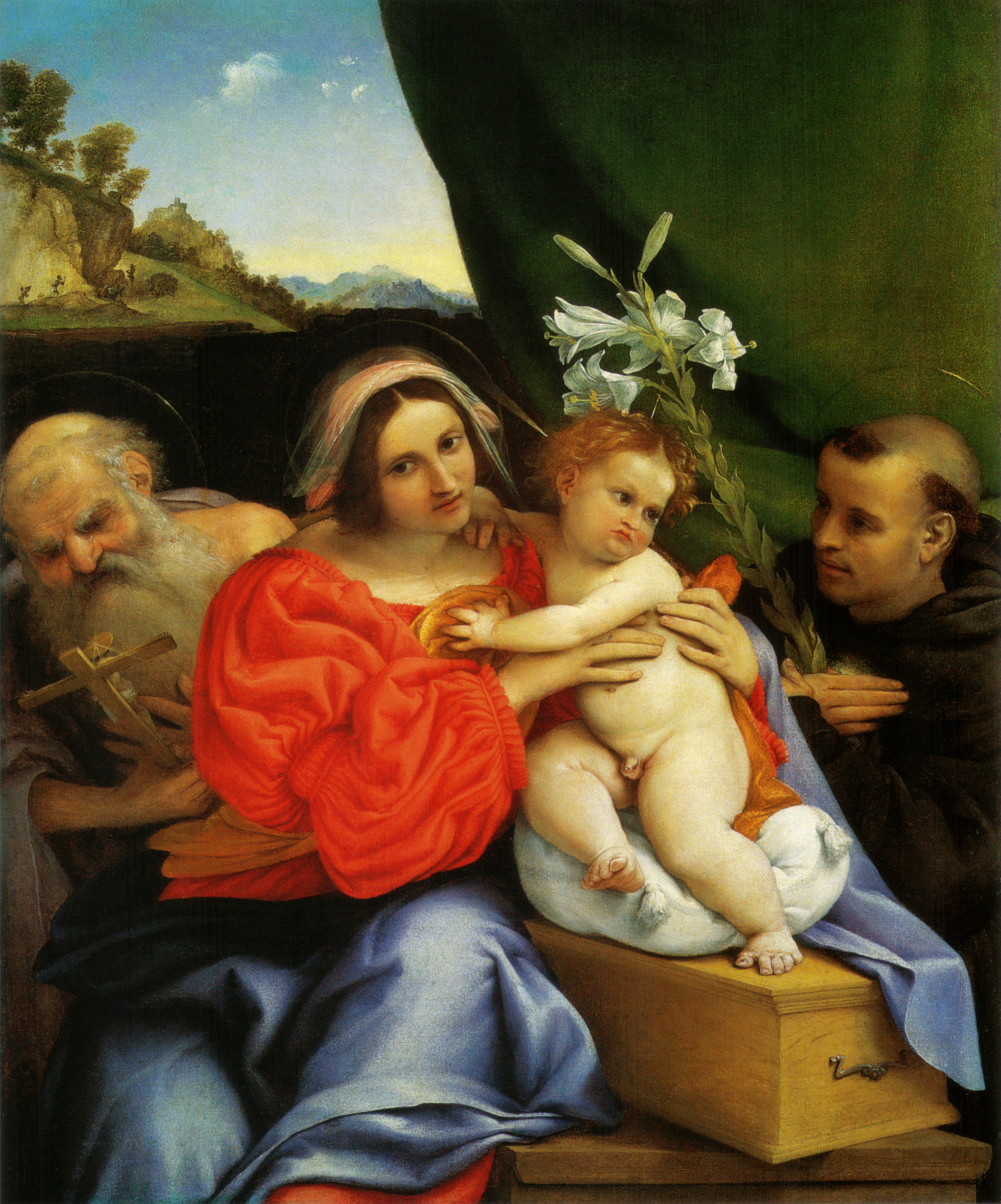
Madonna and Child with Saint Jerome and Saint Nicholas of Tolentino (1523–1524) by Lorenzo Lotto

Madonna and Child with Saint Jerome and Saint Nicholas of Tolentino is an oil-on-canvas painting by Lorenzo Lotto executed c. 1523–1524. It is known to have been in the Dawkins collection in Oxford between 1911 and 1955, before passing to the Heinemann collection in New York. In 1960 it passed to its present owner, the Museum of Fine Arts, Boston, which also owns a workshop version of his Mystic Marriage of St Catherine.

It dates to the end of the painter's time in Bergamo – Madonna and Child with Saint John the Baptist and Saint Catherine (Palma Camozzi collection, Costa di Mezzate) is usually held to be an earlier version dating to 1522 and both works use the same preparatory drawings. The two flanking saints in the works are St Jerome (left) and Nicholas of Tolentino (right).
