= Benedetta Cambiagio Frassinello =

Italian saint, nun and foundress

Saint Benedetta Cambiagio Frassinello

Religious
- Born: 2 October 1791; Langasco, Genoa, Kingdom of Sardinia
- Died: 21 March 1858 (aged 66); Ronco Scrivia, Genoa, Kingdom of Sardinia
- Venerated in: Roman Catholic Church
- Beatified: 10 May 1987, Saint Peter's Square, Vatican City by Pope John Paul II
- Canonized: 19 May 2002, Saint Peter's Square, Vatican City by Pope John Paul II
- Feast: 21 March; 10 May (Diocese of Pavia)
- Attributes: Religious habit
- Patronage: Benedictine Sisters of Providence; Educators

Benedetta Cambiagio Frassinello was an Italian Roman Catholic professed religious and the founder of the Benedictine Sisters of Providence. Frassinello married to appease her parents in 1816 but the couple decided to lead a chaste life and both pursued a call to the religious life with Frassinello joining the Ursulines in Capriolo at Brescia. But husband and wife later reunited after setting out to establish schools for the education of girls and the pair moved back to Genoa where she founded her order in 1838 based on the Benedictine charism.

Frassinello's beatification was celebrated in 1987 and she was canonized as a saint in 2002.

== Life ==
Benedetta Cambiagio was born on 2 October 1791 in Langasco in Genoa as the last of six children to Giuseppe Cambiagio and Francesca Ghiglione.

Due to political discord, the family settled in Pavia in 1804. In 1811 she had a spiritual experience that gave her a profound desire for a life of penance and of total consecration to God. However, in obedience to the wishes of her parents, on 7 February 1816 she married the farmer and carpenter Giovanni Battista Frassinello in the Basilica of San Michele. In 1818 the couple decided each to live a celibate life "as brother and sister" more so because he was so impressed with her holiness and her desire for the religious life. The couple took in Benedetta's sister Maria who was suffering from intestinal cancer and whose husband had left her. The pair cared for her until she died in July 1825.

Her husband Giovanni Battista entered the Somaschi Fathers and Benedetta joined the Ursuline congregation at Capriolo after having failed to join the Capuchin Poor Clares in Genoa. In 1826 she was forced to leave because of ill health and returned to Pavia but had a vision of Girolamo Emiliani who healed her. Once she regained her health - with the approval of the Bishop of Pavia Luigi Tosi - she dedicated herself to the education of girls. Benedetta needed help in handling such a great task and so Bishop Tosi asked Giovanni Battista to leave the Somaschi Fathers novitiate and help Benedetta in her apostolic work. The pair made a vow to remain chaste in the hands of Bishop Tosi and then began their common work to promote the human and religious formation of poor and abandoned girls; their educational work proved to be of great benefit to Pavia and a school was opened in 1827. The Austrian government recognized her as a "Promoter of Public Education".

Young female volunteers aided her, in due time to whom she them gave a rule of life that later received ecclesiastical approval from the competent authorities. Frassinello also joined formation in catechesis to in domestic skills like cooking and sewing aiming to transform her students into "models of Christian life" and so assure the formation of families. Her work was considered pioneering for those times. Although Giovanni had left the Somaschi Fathers as the bishop's request, and both had made a vow of chastity before the bishop, that did not stop many from gossiping. In 1838, in order that she might not be a hindrance to the work, she turned over the institution to the Bishop of Pavia, and withdrew to another town.

Her former husband and five companions joined her in moving to Ronco Scrivia in the Genoa region on 16 July 1838. The group opened a school for girls there and that was a refinement on what had been done in Pavia. Benedetta founded the Benedictine Sisters of Providence on 28 October 1838; it received diocesan approval in 1858, the papal decree of praise on 24 June 1917 from Pope Benedict XV and papal approval from Pope Pius XI on 2 March 1937. In her rule she stressed the education of girls and instilled the spirit of unlimited confidence and abandonment to Divine providence and to the love of God through chief Benedictine principles. The order grew at a rapid pace since it performed a much-needed service. Benedetta was able to guide the development of the order until her death. On 21 March 1858 she died in Ronco Scrivia. In 1944 Allied bombings devastated the region and her remains were lost in the destruction. Her order is now present in places such as Spain and Burundi and in 2005 there were 113 religious in 22 houses.

== Sainthood ==
The beatification process commenced in an informative process that Cardinal Carlo Minoretti oversaw from 1927 until closing it at a special Mass in 1932. Theologians approved her writings on 20 November 1940, having deemed them to be in line with the Catholic faith. The postulation submitted the Positio dossier to the Congregation for the Causes of Saints in 1979 while their historical consultants approved the cause on 29 April 1980. Theological experts also voiced their assent to the cause on 23 April 1985 as did the C.C.S. members later on 4 June 1985; Pope John Paul II confirmed that Frassinello possessed heroic virtue and so on 6 July 1985 titled her as Venerable.

The process for the miracle needed for beatification was investigated where it occurred in and it received C.C.S. validation on 17 January 1986. Medical experts believed this healing to be a miracle on 10 July 1986 as did theologians on 7 November 1986 and the C.C.S. on 23 December 1986. John Paul II confirmed the healing was a miracle on 3 January 1987 and later beatified Frassinello on 10 May 1987 in Saint Peter's Square. The second and final miracle needed for full sainthood was investigated much like the first and was validated on 24 September 1999; medical experts approved this on 20 December 2000 with the theologians and C.C.S. following suit. John Paul II approved this healing as a miracle on 20 December 2001 and on 26 February 2002 - at 11:00am in the Clementine Hall - confirmed the date for sainthood. John Paul II canonized Frassinello on 19 May 2002 in Saint Peter's Square.

== See also ==
- Saint Benedetta Cambiagio Frassinello, patron saint archive
