= Castelli Calepio =

- Comune
- Comune di Castelli Calepio
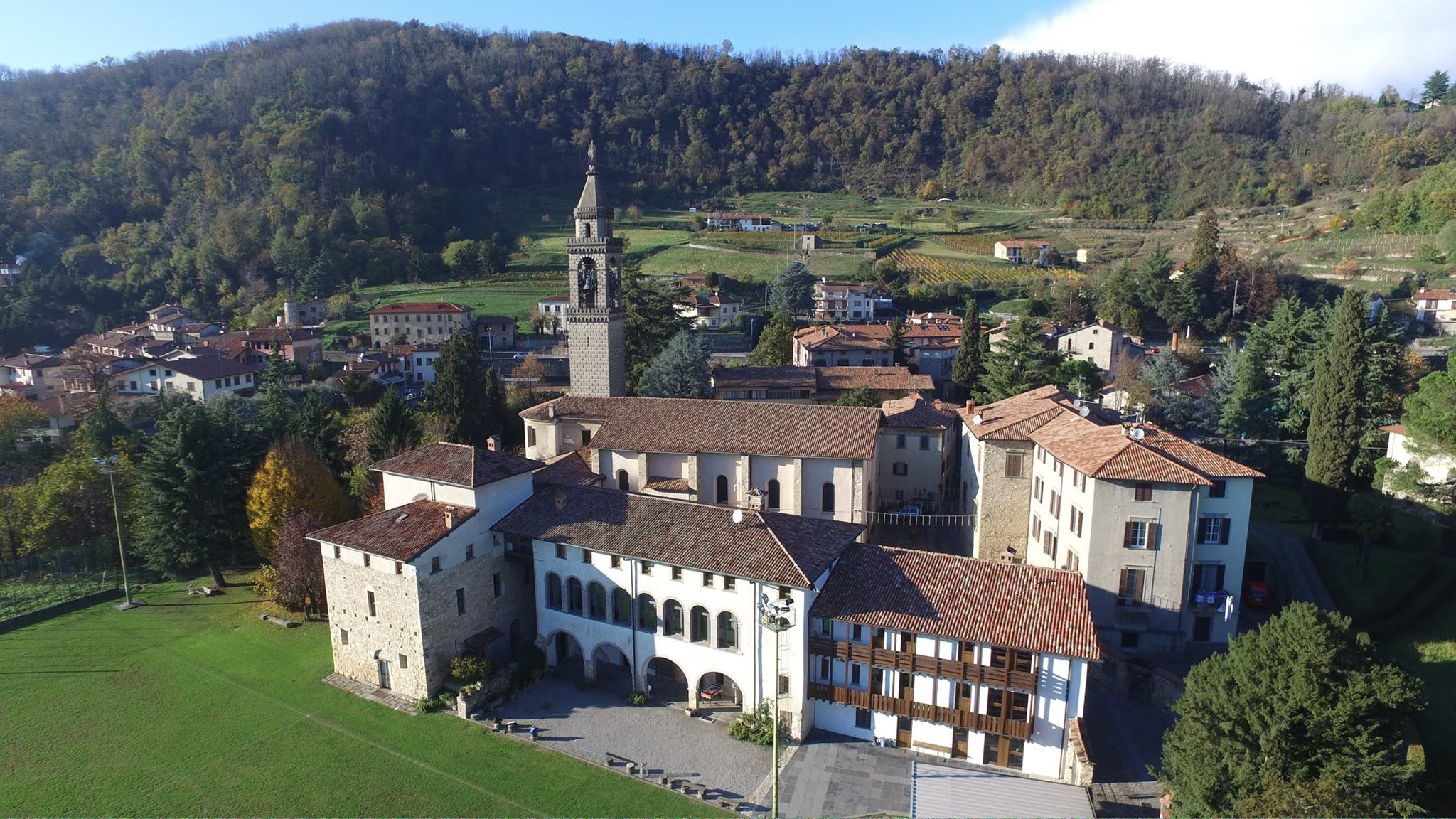
- Castle of Calepio

- Coat of arms

- Location within Italy Location within Lombardy
- Coordinates: 45°38′N 9°54′E
- Country: Italy
- Region: Lombardy
- Province: Bergamo (BG)
- Frazioni: Tagliuno (municipal seat), Calepio, Cividino, Quintano

Government
  - Mayor: Giovanni Benini

Area
  - Total: 9.9 km^{2} (3.8 sq mi)
- Elevation: 259 m (850 ft)

Population (2009)
  - Total: 10,018
  - Density: 1,000/km^{2} (2,600/sq mi)
- Demonym: Castellesi
- Time zone: UTC+1 (CET)
  - Summer (DST): UTC+2 (CEST)
- Postal code: 24060
- Dialing code: 035 (Tagliuno and Calepio), 030 (Cividino and Quintano)
- Website: Official website

Castelli Calepio (Bergamasque: Castèi Calèpe) is a comune (municipality) in the Province of Bergamo in the Italian region of Lombardy, located about 60 kilometres (37 mi) northeast of Milan and about 20 kilometres (12 mi) southeast of Bergamo. The municipal seat is in the frazione of Tagliuno.

Castelli Calepio borders the following municipalities: Capriolo, Credaro, Gandosso, Grumello del Monte, Palazzolo sull'Oglio.
