= Albano Sant'Alessandro =

Albano Sant'Alessandro 'Lbà Sant Alissand (Lombard)
- Comune
- Comune di Albano Sant'Alessandro
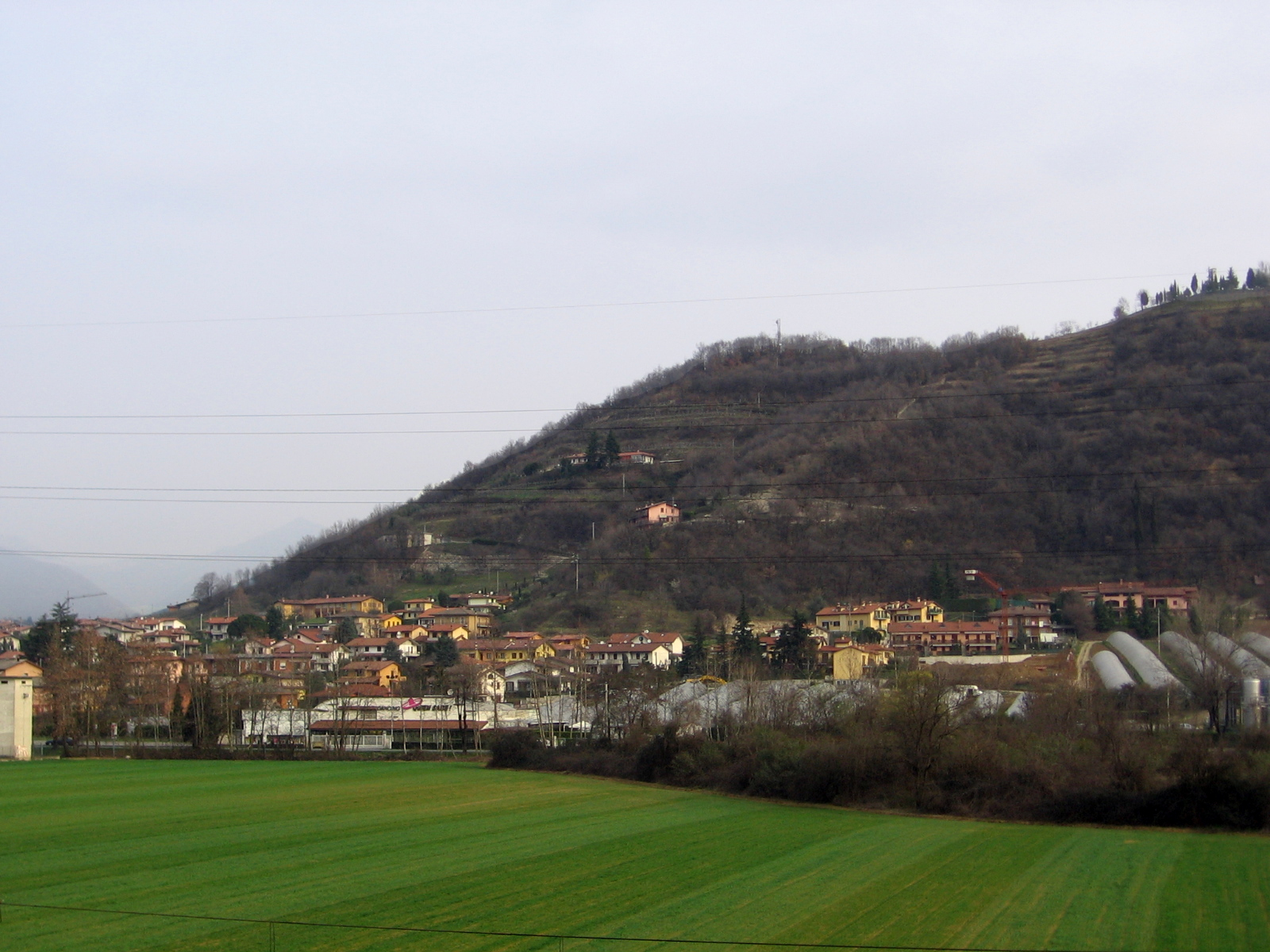
- View of Albano Sant'Alessandro

- Coat of arms

- Location of Albano Sant'Alessandro in Italy Albano Sant'Alessandro (Lombardy)
- Coordinates: 45°41′N 09°45′E
- Country: Italy
- Region: Lombardy
- Province: Province of Bergamo (BG)

Government
  - Mayor: Massimo Bossetti

Area
  - Total: 5.28 km^{2} (2.04 sq mi)
- Elevation: 243 m (797 ft)

Population (2011)
  - Total: 8,100
  - Density: 1,500/km^{2} (4,000/sq mi)
- Demonym: Albanesi
- Time zone: UTC+1 (CET)
  - Summer (DST): UTC+2 (CEST)
- Postal code: 24061
- Dialing code: 035
- Patron saint: San Cornelio and San Cipriano
- Saint day: September 16
- Website: Official website

Albano Sant'Alessandro (Bergamasque: 'Lbà Sant Alissand) is a comune in the province of Bergamo, in Lombardy, Italy.

The coat of arms of Albano Sant'Alessandro shows a silver star on yellow on the left and a golden soldier (Saint Alexander of Bergamo) on red on the right.

== Bordering comuni ==
- Torre de' Roveri
- San Paolo d'Argon
- Montello
- Bagnatica
- Brusaporto
- Seriate
- Pedrengo
