= Telgate =

- Comune
- Comune di Telgate
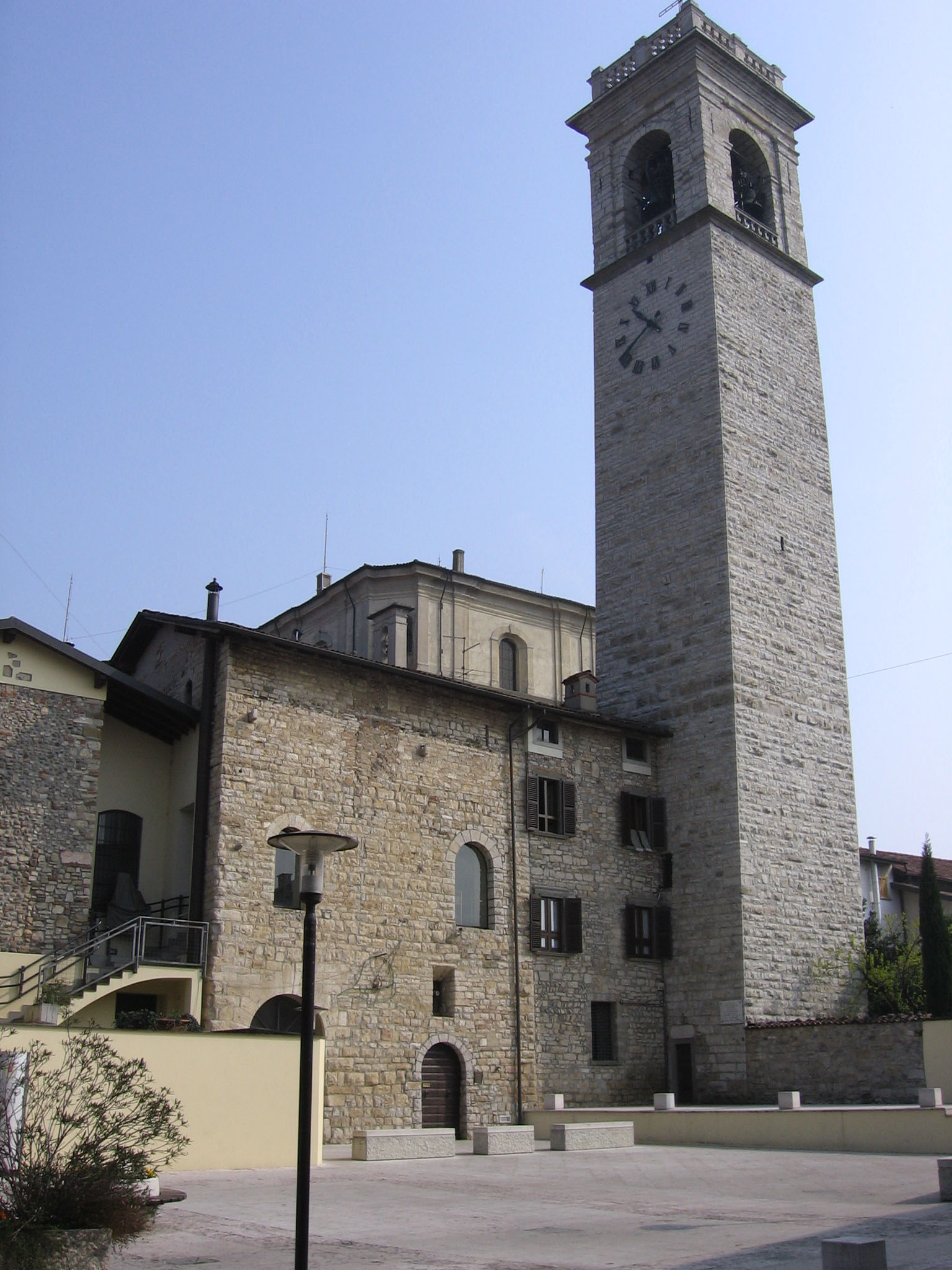

- Location within Italy Location within Lombardy
- Coordinates: 45°38′N 9°51′E
- Country: Italy
- Region: Lombardy
- Province: Province of Bergamo (BG)

Government
  - Mayor: Fabrizio Sala

Area
  - Total: 8.3 km^{2} (3.2 sq mi)
- Elevation: 191 m (627 ft)

Population (31 May 2021)
  - Total: 4,926
  - Density: 590/km^{2} (1,500/sq mi)
- Demonym: Telgatesi
- Time zone: UTC+1 (CET)
  - Summer (DST): UTC+2 (CEST)
- Postal code: 24060
- Dialing code: 035
- Website: Official website

Telgate (Bergamasque: Telgàt) is a comune (municipality) in the Province of Bergamo in the Italian region of Lombardy, located about 60 kilometres (37 mi) northeast of Milan and about 15 kilometres (9 mi) southeast of Bergamo. As of 31 December 2004, it had a population of 4,598 and an area of 8.1 square kilometres (3.1 mi^{2}).

Telgate borders the following municipalities: Bolgare, Chiuduno, Grumello del Monte, Palazzolo sull'Oglio, Palosco.

The main church is San Giovanni Battista.

== Twin towns ==
Telgate is twinned with:

- Šmartno pri Litiji, Slovenia
