= San Giovanni Battista, Telgate =

Roman Catholic church in Italy

Coordinates: 45.626783°N 9.855060°E

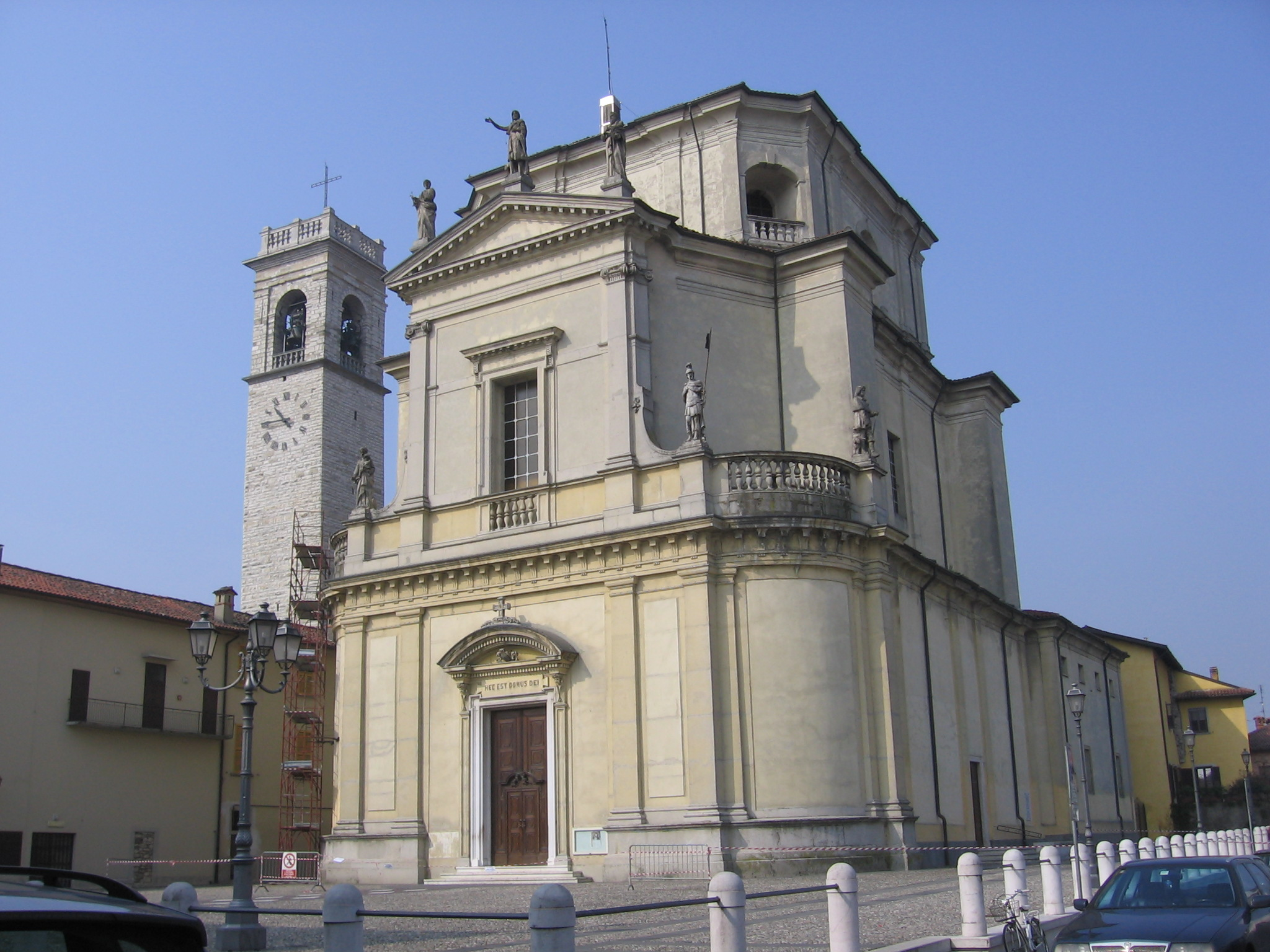

San Giovanni Battista is a baroque-style, Roman Catholic parish church located in the town of Telgate, province of Bergamo, region of Lombardy, Italy.

== History ==
Documents recall a church at the site able to provide baptisms dating as far back as 830. In 1575, this so-called arcipresbiterale di Telgate was a collegiate church.

The present church dates to a reconstruction in 1730 (296 years ago) designed by Giovanni Battista Caniana. The belltower was erected along the earlier church. The baroque decoration included the cupola frescoes. To make space for a larger church, the older temple and the adjacent oratory of the Disciplini Bianchi (flagellant confraternity) was destroyed. The venerated processional crucifix of the order is housed in the first chapel on the right. The church houses works by Giovanni Paolo Cavagna and del Paglia. The choir was designed by Fantoni.
