= Brusaporto =

- Comune
- Comune di Brusaporto
- Coat of arms

- Location within Italy Location within Lombardy
- Coordinates: 45°40′N 9°46′E
- Country: Italy
- Region: Lombardy
- Province: Province of Bergamo (BG)

Area
  - Total: 5.0 km^{2} (1.9 sq mi)
- Elevation: 255 m (837 ft)

Population (Dec. 2005)
  - Total: 4,611
  - Density: 920/km^{2} (2,400/sq mi)
- Demonym: Brusaportesi
- Time zone: UTC+1 (CET)
  - Summer (DST): UTC+2 (CEST)
- Postal code: 24060
- Dialing code: 035

Brusaporto (Bergamasque: Brüsa) is a comune (municipality) in the Province of Bergamo in the Italian region of Lombardy, located about 50 kilometres (31 mi) northeast of Milan and about 9 kilometres (6 mi) southeast of Bergamo. As of 31 December 2004, it had a population of 4,524 and an area of 5.0 square kilometres (1.9 mi^{2}).

Brusaporto borders the following municipalities: Albano Sant'Alessandro, Bagnatica, Seriate.

== Demographic evolution ==
Historical population

Year	Pop.	±%
1861	770	—
1871	777	+0.9%
1881	735	−5.4%
1901	878	+19.5%
1911	1,081	+23.1%

Year	Pop.	±%
1921	1,161	+7.4%
1931	1,237	+6.5%
1936	1,162	−6.1%
1951	1,383	+19.0%
1961	1,337	−3.3%

Year	Pop.	±%
1971	1,554	+16.2%
1981	2,359	+51.8%
1991	3,155	+33.7%
2001	4,168	+32.1%

Source: Data from ISTAT
