= Carobbio degli Angeli =

- Comune
- Comune di Carobbio degli Angeli
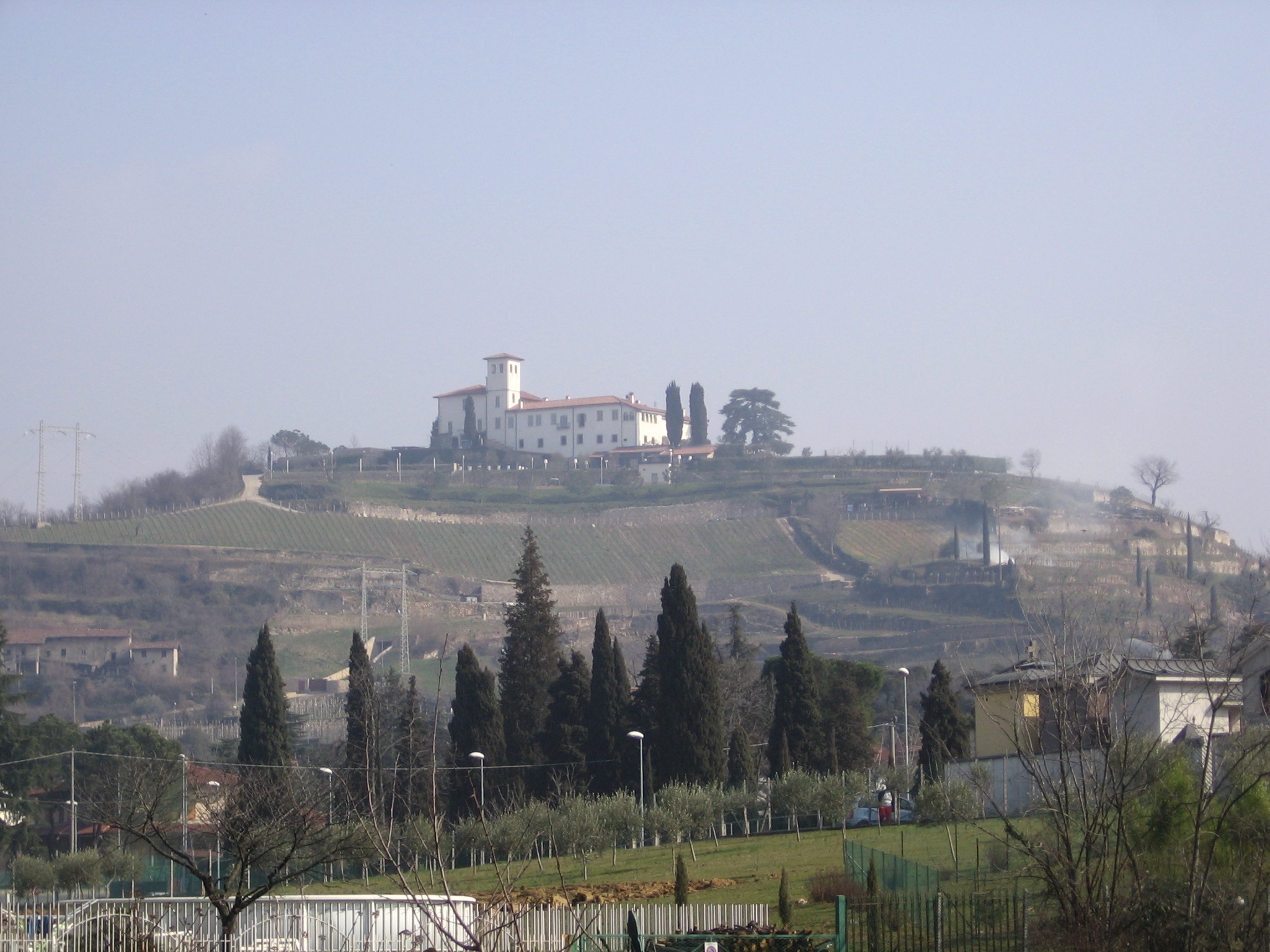
- View of the Castello degli Angeli

- Coat of arms

- Location within Italy Location within Lombardy
- Coordinates: 45°40′N 9°50′E
- Country: Italy
- Region: Lombardy
- Province: Bergamo (BG)
- Frazioni: Cicola, Santo Stefano degli Angeli

Government
  - Mayor: Giuseppe Ondei

Area
  - Total: 6.82 km^{2} (2.63 sq mi)
- Elevation: 232 m (761 ft)

Population (31 May 2021)
  - Total: 4,748
  - Density: 696/km^{2} (1,800/sq mi)
- Demonym: Carobbiesi
- Time zone: UTC+1 (CET)
  - Summer (DST): UTC+2 (CEST)
- Postal code: 24060
- Dialing code: 035
- Patron saint: St. Pancratius
- Saint day: July 9
- Website: Official website

Carobbio degli Angeli (Bergamasque: Caròbe di Àngei) is a comune (municipality) in the Province of Bergamo in the Italian region of Lombardy, located about 60 kilometres (37 mi) northeast of Milan and about 13 kilometres (8 mi) southeast of Bergamo.

Carobbio degli Angeli borders the following municipalities: Bolgare, Chiuduno, Gandosso, Gorlago, Grumello del Monte, Trescore Balneario.

== History ==
The village has Roman origins. In the 14th century AD it received a castle. Later it was a possession of the Republic of Venice.

The current comune was created in 1928 through the merger of Carobbio and Santo Stefano degli Angeli.

== Main sights ==
- Castello degli Angeli ("Castle of the Angels")
- Villa Riccardi, used by the bishops of Bergamo for their leisure.
