= Gandosso =

- Comune
- Comune di Gandosso
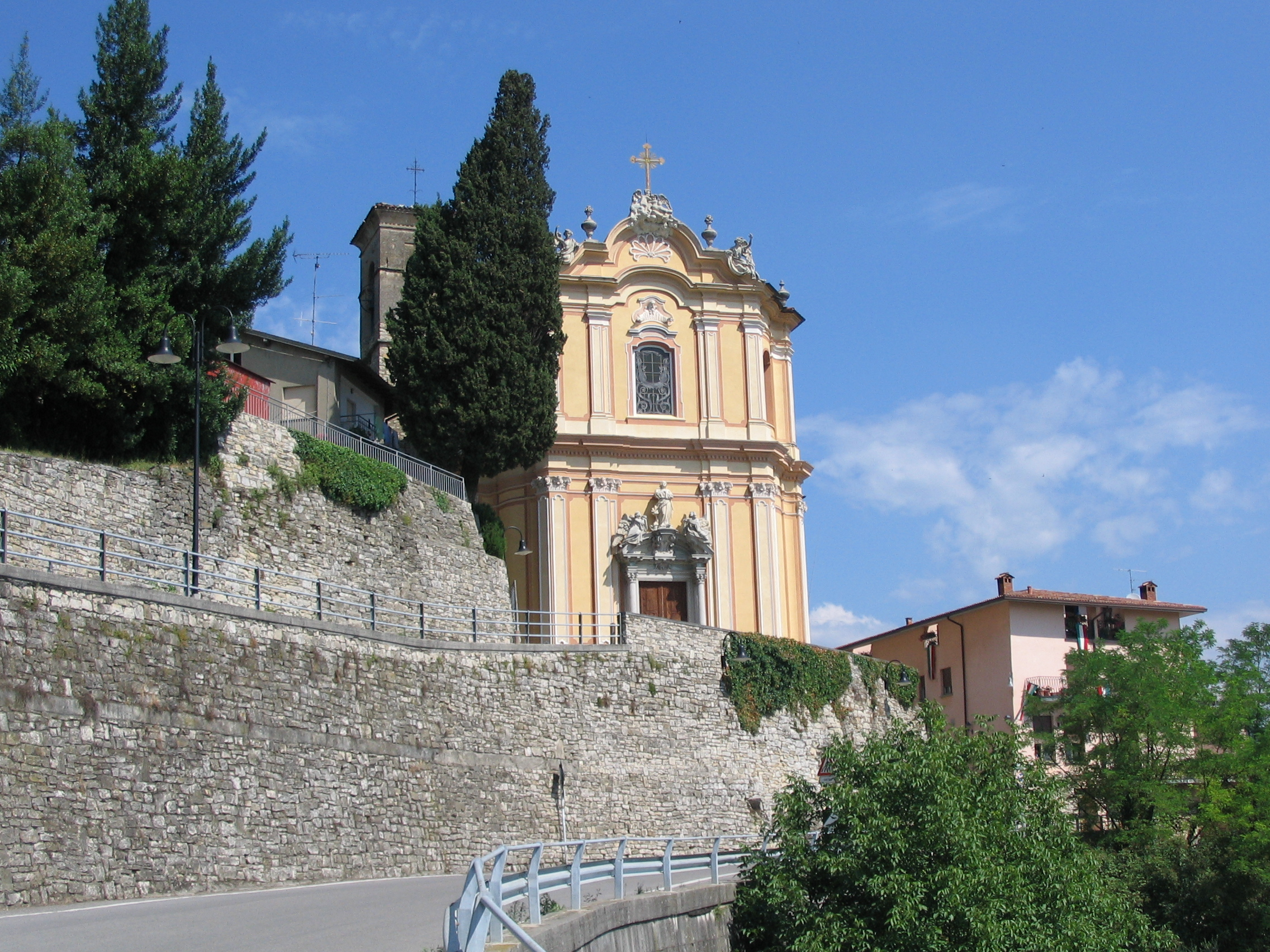
- Church

- Location within Italy Location within Lombardy
- Coordinates: 45°39′N 9°54′E
- Country: Italy
- Region: Lombardy
- Province: Bergamo (BG)

Government
  - Mayor: Alberto Maffi

Area
  - Total: 3.1 km^{2} (1.2 sq mi)
- Elevation: 488 m (1,601 ft)

Population (31 December 2010)
  - Total: 1,527
  - Density: 490/km^{2} (1,300/sq mi)
- Demonym: Gandossesi
- Time zone: UTC+1 (CET)
  - Summer (DST): UTC+2 (CEST)
- Postal code: 24060
- Dialing code: 035

Gandosso (Bergamasque: Gandòss) is a comune (municipality) in the Province of Bergamo in the Italian region of Lombardy, located about 60 kilometres (37 mi) northeast of Milan and about 20 kilometres (12 mi) southeast of Bergamo.

Gandosso borders the following municipalities: Carobbio degli Angeli, Castelli Calepio, Credaro, Grumello del Monte, Trescore Balneario.
