= Gorlago =

- Comune
- Comune di Gorlago
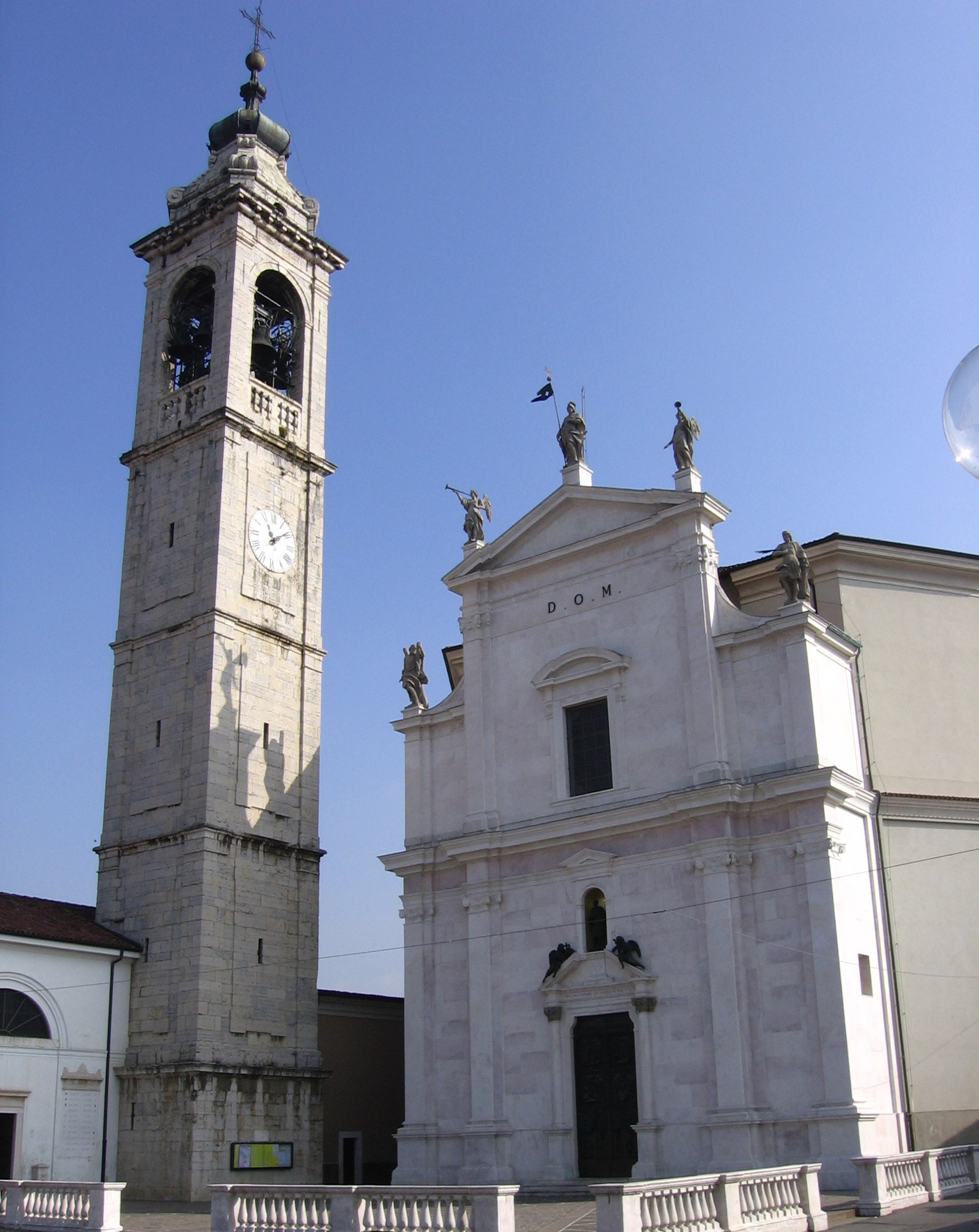
- Church

- Location within Italy Location within Lombardy
- Coordinates: 45°40′N 9°49′E
- Country: Italy
- Region: Lombardy
- Province: Province of Bergamo (BG)

Government
  - Mayor: Gianluigi Marcassoli

Area
  - Total: 5.6 km^{2} (2.2 sq mi)
- Elevation: 233 m (764 ft)

Population (31 December 2014)
  - Total: 5,186
  - Density: 930/km^{2} (2,400/sq mi)
- Demonym: Gorlaghesi
- Time zone: UTC+1 (CET)
  - Summer (DST): UTC+2 (CEST)
- Postal code: 24060
- Dialing code: 035
- Website: Official website

Gorlago (Bergamasque: Gorlàgh) is a comune (municipality) in the Province of Bergamo in the Italian region of Lombardy, located about 60 kilometres (37 mi) northeast of Milan and about 12 kilometres (7 mi) southeast of Bergamo.

Gorlago borders the following municipalities: Bolgare, Carobbio degli Angeli, Costa di Mezzate, Montello, San Paolo d'Argon, Trescore Balneario.

The opera singer Luigi Bolis owned a villa and farm estate on the banks of the Cherio River in Gorlago in the late 19th century and died there in 1905.
