= Chiuduno =

- Comune
- Comune di Chiuduno
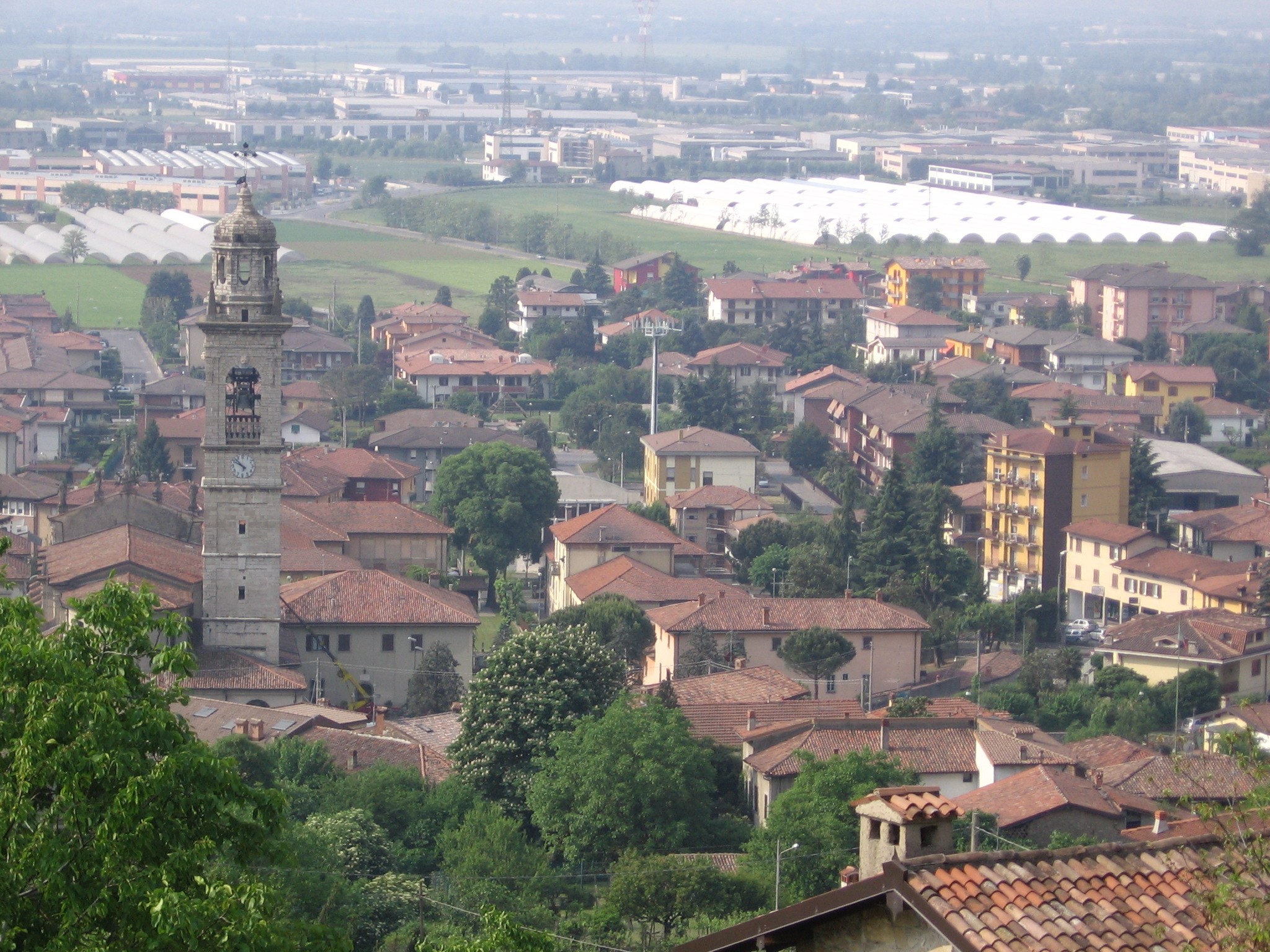
- Chiuduno

- Coat of arms

- Location within Italy Location within Lombardy
- Coordinates: 45°39′N 9°51′E
- Country: Italy
- Region: Lombardy
- Province: Bregamo (BG)

Government
  - Mayor: Stefano Locatelli (2011)

Area
  - Total: 6.6 km^{2} (2.5 sq mi)
- Elevation: 218 m (715 ft)

Population (Dec. 2004)
  - Total: 5,348
  - Density: 810/km^{2} (2,100/sq mi)
- Demonym: Chiudunesi
- Time zone: UTC+1 (CET)
  - Summer (DST): UTC+2 (CEST)
- Postal code: 24060
- Dialing code: 035
- Patron saint: Assumption of Mary
- Saint day: August, 15th

Chiuduno (Bergamasque: Ciüdü) is a comune (municipality) in the Province of Bergamo, in Italian region of Lombardy; Chiuduno is located about 60 kilometres (37 mi) northeast of Milan and about 15 kilometres (9 mi) southeast of Bergamo, midway between the Bergamo plain and the Valcalepio.

Chiuduno borders the following municipalities: Bolgare, Carobbio degli Angeli, Grumello del Monte, Telgate.

== History ==
The settlement has Gaulish origins, and was later a Roman centre as Claudunum on the road between Bergamo and Brescia. It is however mentioned for the first time in a document from 795, and in the Middle Ages it developed and received a fortress.

== Main sights ==
- Castle (9th century), of which only a tower and other parts remain.
- Another fortification on the border with the territory of Carobbio degli Angeli (now Suardi villa, 17th century).

== Demographic evolution ==
Historical population

Year	Pop.	±%
1861	1,579	—
1871	1,768	+12.0%
1881	1,744	−1.4%
1901	2,104	+20.6%
1911	2,524	+20.0%

Year	Pop.	±%
1921	2,776	+10.0%
1931	3,030	+9.1%
1936	2,977	−1.7%
1951	3,261	+9.5%
1961	3,433	+5.3%

Year	Pop.	±%
1971	3,792	+10.5%
1981	4,442	+17.1%
1991	4,466	+0.5%
2001	5,051	+13.1%

Source: Data from ISTAT
