= Tanja Graf =

Austrian politician (born 1975)

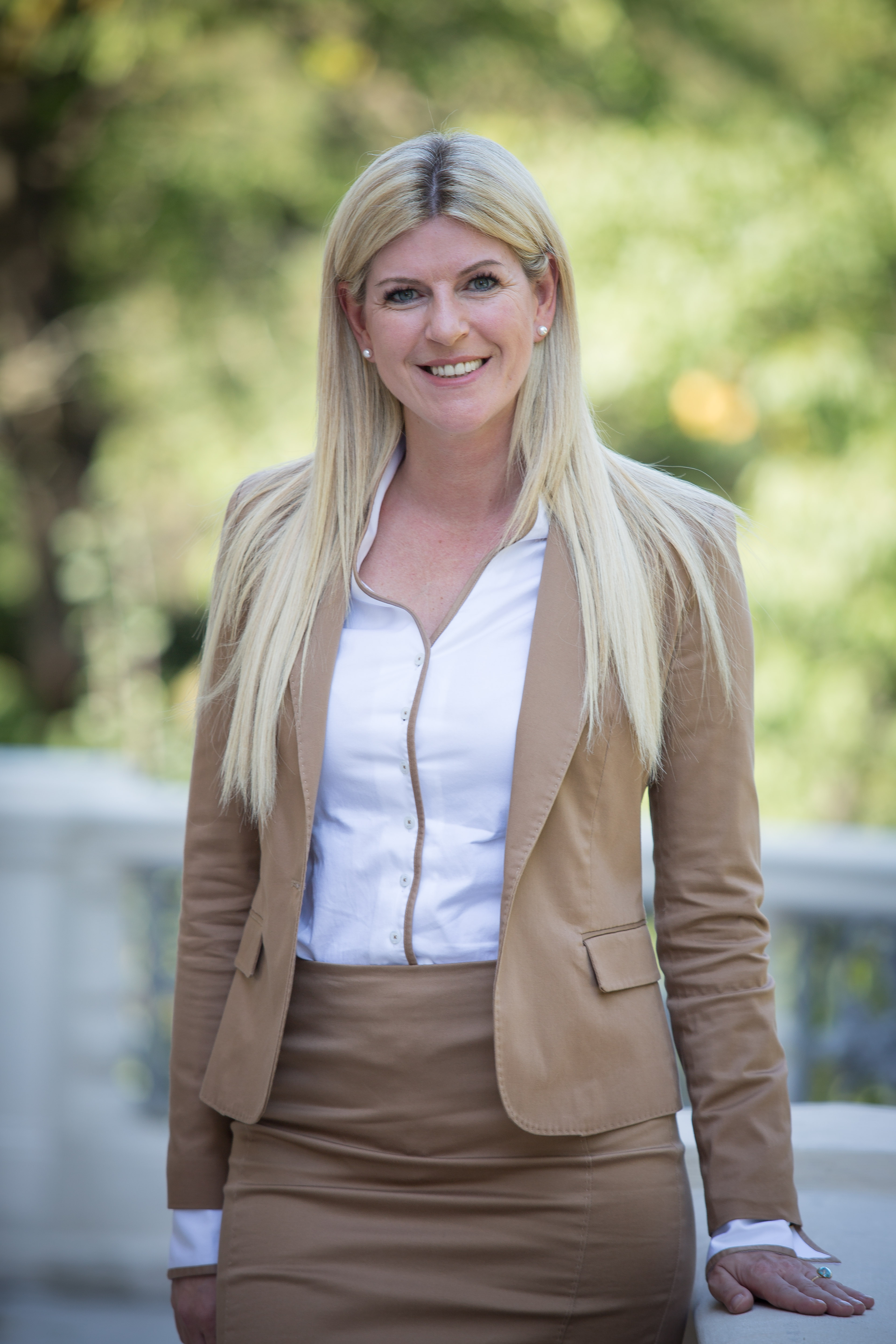
- Graf in 2017

Member of the National Council
- Incumbent
- Assumed office 9 November 2017
- Constituency: Salzburg (2017–2019, 2024–present); Flachgau-Tennengau (2019–2024)

Personal details
- Born: 7 May 1975 (age 50)
- Party: People's Party

Tanja Graf (born 7 May 1975) is an Austrian politician of the People's Party. She has been a member of the National Council since 2017, and has served as secretary of the council since 2024.
