= Volker Reifenberger =

Austrian politician (born 1979)

Member of the National Council
- Incumbent
- Assumed office 13 June 2018
- Preceded by: Marlene Svazek
- Constituency: Flachgau-Tennengau (2018–2019); Salzburg (2019–present)

Personal details
- Born: 5 April 1979 (age 47)
- Party: Freedom Party

Volker Reifenberger (born 5 April 1979) is an Austrian politician of the Freedom Party serving as a member of the National Council since 2018. He served as deputy leader of the Freedom Party in the state of Salzburg from 2016 to 2022, and has served as deputy leader of the Freedom Party in the city of Salzburg since 2019.
