= Ignaz Glaser =

Austrian businessman (1853–1916)

Ignaz Glaser (5 May 1853 – 11 August 1916) was an Austro-Hungarian businessman and the founder at Bürmoos near Salzburg of one of the biggest sheet glass factories in the k.u.k. monarchy.

== Biography ==
In 1881 in Bürmoos near Salzburg, Austria, Glaser used the legal estate of a former glassworks company that went bankrupt four years earlier and bought a giant moor area. He expanded the factory with four glass ovens, which worked with turf. He also founded a brickyard, which was very successful and which existed throughout the 1970s. Bit by bit he then bought further moor areas in the adjacent Weidmoos and at Ibmer moor, where he also started to cultivate hops. In the middle of the Ibmer area, in Hackenbuch, Upper Austria, he established another glass factory. The turf factory was very unstable because it depended largely on the weather and the turf supplies ran out. Glaser then bought a closed sugar factory in North Bohemian Brüx and established a new glass factory. In that factory ovens were heated with coal from an open pit, which made the company independent from weather conditions.

After Glaser’s death on 11 August 1916, his son Dr. Hermann Glaser, born on 18 August 1889, took over the glass factory, which experienced a short economic boom after World War I. But the company failed to update to mechanical flat glass manufacture and the Glaser empire broke down in 1926. In Bürmoos, flat glass was produced by a company named Stiassny until the end of 1929, which then bought the holdings. At this point glass manufacture was shut down totally, rendering eighty percent of the lcaal population unemployed.

Glaser's grave is in the Jewish cemetery in Aigen, Salzburg. His son survived the Holocaust in Shanghai and died on 10 January 1956 in Vienna.

In 2006 the first Ignaz Glaser Symposium, organized by Andreas Maislinger with a focus on integration took place. The third symposium, on civil courage, was held in 2010.
