= Salzburg City (National Council electoral district) =

Parliamentary electoral district in Austria

- Salzburg Stadt
- Electoral District for the National Council
- Location of Salzburg City within Austria
- City: Salzburg
- State: Salzburg
- Population: 157,399 (2024)
- Electorate: 99,178 (2019)
- Area: 66 km^{2} (2023)

Current Electoral District
- Created: 1994
- Seats: 3 (1994–present)

Salzburg City (German: Salzburg Stadt), also known as Electoral District 5A (German: Wahlkreis 5A), is one of the 39 multi-member regional electoral districts of the National Council, the lower house of the Austrian Parliament, the national legislature of Austria. The electoral district was created in 1992 when electoral regulations were amended to add regional electoral districts to the existing state-wide electoral districts and came into being at the following legislative election in 1994. It is conterminous with the city of Salzburg in the state of Salzburg. The electoral district currently elects three of the 183 members of the National Council using the open party-list proportional representation electoral system. At the 2019 legislative election the constituency had 99,178 registered electors.

== History ==
Salzburg City was one 43 regional electoral districts (regionalwahlkreise) established by the "National Council Electoral Regulations 1992" (Nationalrats-Wahlordnung 1992) passed by the National Council in 1992. It was conterminous with the city of Salzburg in the state of Salzburg. The district was initially allocated three seats in May 1993.

== Electoral system ==
Salzburg City currently elects three of the 183 members of the National Council using the open party-list proportional representation electoral system. The allocation of seats is carried out in three stages. In the first stage, seats are allocated to parties (lists) at the regional level using a state-wide Hare quota (wahlzahl) (valid votes in the state divided by the number of seats in the state). In the second stage, seats are allocated to parties at the state/provincial level using the state-wide Hare quota (any seats won by the party at the regional stage are subtracted from the party's state seats). In the third and final stage, seats are allocated to parties at the federal/national level using the D'Hondt method (any seats won by the party at the regional and state stages are subtracted from the party's federal seats). Only parties that reach the 4% national threshold, or have won a seat at the regional stage, compete for seats at the state and federal stages.

Electors may cast one preferential vote for individual candidates at the regional, state and federal levels. Split-ticket voting (panachage), or voting for more than one candidate at each level, is not permitted and will result in the ballot paper being invalidated. At the regional level, candidates must receive preferential votes amounting to at least 14% of the valid votes cast for their party to over-ride the order of the party list (10% and 7% respectively for the state and federal levels). Prior to April 2013 electors could not cast preferential votes at the federal level and the thresholds candidates needed to over-ride the party list order were higher at the regional level (half the Hare quota or 1/6 of the party votes) and state level (Hare quota).

== Election results ==
=== Summary ===
Election	Communists KPÖ+ / KPÖ			Social Democrats SPÖ			Greens GRÜNE			NEOS NEOS / LiF			People's ÖVP			Freedom FPÖ		
Election	Votes	%	Seats	Votes	%	Seats	Votes	%	Seats	Votes	%	Seats	Votes	%	Seats	Votes	%	Seats
2019	871	1.26%	0	12,720	18.36%	0	13,777	19.89%	0	6,914	9.98%	0	25,321	36.55%	0	7,771	11.22%	0
2017	922	1.24%	0	19,571	26.31%	0	5,026	6.76%	0	5,172	6.95%	0	23,379	31.43%	0	15,111	20.32%	0
2013	816	1.23%	0	15,690	23.59%	0	13,823	20.78%	0	4,252	6.39%	0	13,527	20.34%	0	12,388	18.62%	0
2008	578	0.81%	0	17,337	24.22%	0	13,121	18.33%	0	1,872	2.62%	0	16,846	23.54%	0	12,196	17.04%	0
2006	808	1.17%	0	19,283	27.93%	0	13,359	19.35%	0				21,864	31.67%	0	8,825	12.78%	0
2002	412	0.54%	0	23,740	31.34%	0	12,238	16.16%	0	974	1.29%	0	29,923	39.50%	1	8,461	11.17%	0
1999	309	0.44%	0	19,951	28.47%	0	8,519	12.16%	0	4,428	6.32%	0	14,558	20.77%	0	21,256	30.33%	0
1995	193	0.25%	0	24,975	32.04%	0	6,190	7.94%	0	6,828	8.76%	0	18,407	23.62%	0	20,518	26.33%	0
1994				20,408	28.52%	0	8,421	11.77%	0	6,744	9.42%	0	15,918	22.25%	0	18,881	26.39%	0

=== Detailed ===
==== 2010s ====
===== 2019 =====
Results of the 2019 legislative election held on 29 September 2019:

Party		Votes	%	Seats
Austrian People's Party	ÖVP	25,321	36.55%	0
The Greens – The Green Alternative	GRÜNE	13,777	19.89%	0
Social Democratic Party of Austria	SPÖ	12,720	18.36%	0
Freedom Party of Austria	FPÖ	7,771	11.22%	0
NEOS – The New Austria and Liberal Forum	NEOS	6,914	9.98%	0
JETZT	JETZT	1,491	2.15%	0
KPÖ Plus	KPÖ+	871	1.26%	0
Der Wandel	WANDL	409	0.59%	0
Valid Votes		69,274	100.00%	0
Rejected Votes		666	0.95%	
Total Polled		69,940	70.52%	
Registered Electors		99,178		

===== 2017 =====
Results of the 2017 legislative election held on 15 October 2017:

Party		Votes	%	Seats
Austrian People's Party	ÖVP	23,379	31.43%	0
Social Democratic Party of Austria	SPÖ	19,571	26.31%	0
Freedom Party of Austria	FPÖ	15,111	20.32%	0
NEOS – The New Austria and Liberal Forum	NEOS	5,172	6.95%	0
The Greens – The Green Alternative	GRÜNE	5,026	6.76%	0
Peter Pilz List	PILZ	3,951	5.31%	0
Communist Party of Austria	KPÖ	922	1.24%	0
My Vote Counts!	GILT	760	1.02%	0
Free List Austria	FLÖ	371	0.50%	0
The Whites	WEIßE	112	0.15%	0
Valid Votes		74,375	100.00%	0
Rejected Votes		601	0.80%	
Total Polled		74,976	75.04%	
Registered Electors		99,914		

===== 2013 =====
Results of the 2013 legislative election held on 29 September 2013:

Party		Votes	%	Seats
Social Democratic Party of Austria	SPÖ	15,690	23.59%	0
The Greens – The Green Alternative	GRÜNE	13,823	20.78%	0
Austrian People's Party	ÖVP	13,527	20.34%	0
Freedom Party of Austria	FPÖ	12,388	18.62%	0
NEOS – The New Austria	NEOS	4,252	6.39%	0
Team Stronach	FRANK	3,285	4.94%	0
Alliance for the Future of Austria	BZÖ	2,147	3.23%	0
Communist Party of Austria	KPÖ	816	1.23%	0
Pirate Party of Austria	PIRAT	586	0.88%	0
Valid Votes		66,514	100.00%	0
Rejected Votes		1,074	1.59%	
Total Polled		67,588	67.09%	
Registered Electors		100,748		

==== 2000s ====
===== 2008 =====
Results of the 2008 legislative election held on 28 September 2008:

Party		Votes	%	Seats
Social Democratic Party of Austria	SPÖ	17,337	24.22%	0
Austrian People's Party	ÖVP	16,846	23.54%	0
The Greens – The Green Alternative	GRÜNE	13,121	18.33%	0
Freedom Party of Austria	FPÖ	12,196	17.04%	0
Alliance for the Future of Austria	BZÖ	7,350	10.27%	0
Liberal Forum	LiF	1,872	2.62%	0
Fritz Dinkhauser List – Citizens' Forum Tyrol	FRITZ	1,028	1.44%	0
Independent Citizens' Initiative Save Austria	RETTÖ	602	0.84%	0
Communist Party of Austria	KPÖ	578	0.81%	0
The Christians	DC	528	0.74%	0
Left	LINKE	117	0.16%	0
Valid Votes		71,575	100.00%	0
Rejected Votes		1,246	1.71%	
Total Polled		72,821	70.28%	
Registered Electors		103,618		

===== 2006 =====
Results of the 2006 legislative election held on 1 October 2006:

Party		Votes	%	Seats
Austrian People's Party	ÖVP	21,864	31.67%	0
Social Democratic Party of Austria	SPÖ	19,283	27.93%	0
The Greens – The Green Alternative	GRÜNE	13,359	19.35%	0
Freedom Party of Austria	FPÖ	8,825	12.78%	0
Alliance for the Future of Austria	BZÖ	2,383	3.45%	0
Hans-Peter Martin's List	MATIN	2,083	3.02%	0
Communist Party of Austria	KPÖ	808	1.17%	0
EU Withdrawal – Neutral Free Austria	NFÖ	435	0.63%	0
Valid Votes		69,040	100.00%	0
Rejected Votes		1,198	1.71%	
Total Polled		70,238	68.85%	
Registered Electors		102,015		

===== 2002 =====
Results of the 2002 legislative election held on 24 November 2002:

Party		Votes	%	Seats
Austrian People's Party	ÖVP	29,923	39.50%	1
Social Democratic Party of Austria	SPÖ	23,740	31.34%	0
The Greens – The Green Alternative	GRÜNE	12,238	16.16%	0
Freedom Party of Austria	FPÖ	8,461	11.17%	0
Liberal Forum	LiF	974	1.29%	0
Communist Party of Austria	KPÖ	412	0.54%	0
Valid Votes		75,748	100.00%	1
Rejected Votes		988	1.29%	
Total Polled		76,736	76.67%	
Registered Electors		100,082		

The following candidates were elected:

- Party mandates - Franz Xaver Böhm (ÖVP), 665 votes. (Note: ÖVP: 1st placed candidate Benita Ferrero-Waldner was elected on the federal list.)

==== 1990s ====
===== 1999 =====
Results of the 1999 legislative election held on 3 October 1999:

Party		Votes	%	Seats
Freedom Party of Austria	FPÖ	21,256	30.33%	0
Social Democratic Party of Austria	SPÖ	19,951	28.47%	0
Austrian People's Party	ÖVP	14,558	20.77%	0
The Greens – The Green Alternative	GRÜNE	8,519	12.16%	0
Liberal Forum	LiF	4,428	6.32%	0
The Independents	DU	521	0.74%	0
Communist Party of Austria	KPÖ	309	0.44%	0
Christian Voters Community	CWG	291	0.42%	0
No to NATO and EU – Neutral Austria Citizens' Initiative	NEIN	245	0.35%	0
Valid Votes		70,078	100.00%	0
Rejected Votes		819	1.16%	
Total Polled		70,897	71.49%	
Registered Electors		99,164		

===== 1995 =====
Results of the 1995 legislative election held on 17 December 1995:

Party		Votes	%	Seats
Social Democratic Party of Austria	SPÖ	24,975	32.04%	0
Freedom Party of Austria	FPÖ	20,518	26.33%	0
Austrian People's Party	ÖVP	18,407	23.62%	0
Liberal Forum	LiF	6,828	8.76%	0
The Greens – The Green Alternative	GRÜNE	6,190	7.94%	0
No – Civic Action Group; Against the Sale of Austria	NEIN	827	1.06%	0
Communist Party of Austria	KPÖ	193	0.25%	0
Valid Votes		77,938	100.00%	0
Rejected Votes		1,195	1.51%	
Total Polled		79,133	79.00%	
Registered Electors		100,171		

===== 1994 =====
Results of the 1994 legislative election held on 9 October 1994:

Party		Votes	%	Seats
Social Democratic Party of Austria	SPÖ	20,408	28.52%	0
Freedom Party of Austria	FPÖ	18,881	26.39%	0
Austrian People's Party	ÖVP	15,918	22.25%	0
The Greens – The Green Alternative	GRÜNE	8,421	11.77%	0
Liberal Forum	LiF	6,744	9.42%	0
No – Civic Action Group; Against the Sale of Austria	NEIN	686	0.96%	0
Christian Voters Community	CWG	395	0.55%	0
United Greens Austria – List Adi Pinter	VGÖ	102	0.14%	0
Valid Votes		71,555	100.00%	0
Rejected Votes		1,269	1.74%	
Total Polled		72,824	71.76%	
Registered Electors		101,478		
