= Flachgau-Tennengau (National Council electoral district) =

Parliamentary electoral district in Austria

- Electoral District for the National Council
- Location of Flachgau-Tennengau within Austria
- District: List: Hallein; Salzburg-Umgebung
- State: Salzburg
- Population: 220,272 (2024)
- Electorate: 157,803 (2019)
- Area: 1,673 km^{2} (2023)

Current Electoral District
- Created: 1994
- Seats: 4 (1994–present)
- Members: List: Tanja Graf (ÖVP); Peter Haubner (ÖVP)

Flachgau-Tennengau, also known as Electoral District 5B (German: Wahlkreis 5B), is one of the 39 multi-member regional electoral districts of the National Council, the lower house of the Austrian Parliament, the national legislature of Austria. The electoral district was created in 1992 when electoral regulations were amended to add regional electoral districts to the existing state-wide electoral districts and came into being at the following legislative election in 1994. It consists of the districts of Hallein and Salzburg-Umgebung in the state of Salzburg. The electoral district currently elects four of the 183 members of the National Council using the open party-list proportional representation electoral system. At the 2019 legislative election the constituency had 157,803 registered electors.

== History ==
Flachgau-Tennengau was one 43 regional electoral districts (regionalwahlkreise) established by the "National Council Electoral Regulations 1992" (Nationalrats-Wahlordnung 1992) passed by the National Council in 1992. It consisted of the districts of Hallein and Salzburg-Umgebung in the state of Salzburg. The district was initially allocated four seats in May 1993.

== Electoral system ==
Flachgau-Tennengau currently elects four of the 183 members of the National Council using the open party-list proportional representation electoral system. The allocation of seats is carried out in three stages. In the first stage, seats are allocated to parties (lists) at the regional level using a state-wide Hare quota (wahlzahl) (valid votes in the state divided by the number of seats in the state). In the second stage, seats are allocated to parties at the state/provincial level using the state-wide Hare quota (any seats won by the party at the regional stage are subtracted from the party's state seats). In the third and final stage, seats are allocated to parties at the federal/national level using the D'Hondt method (any seats won by the party at the regional and state stages are subtracted from the party's federal seats). Only parties that reach the 4% national threshold, or have won a seat at the regional stage, compete for seats at the state and federal stages.

Electors may cast one preferential vote for individual candidates at the regional, state and federal levels. Split-ticket voting (panachage), or voting for more than one candidate at each level, is not permitted and will result in the ballot paper being invalidated. At the regional level, candidates must receive preferential votes amounting to at least 14% of the valid votes cast for their party to over-ride the order of the party list (10% and 7% respectively for the state and federal levels). Prior to April 2013 electors could not cast preferential votes at the federal level and the thresholds candidates needed to over-ride the party list order were higher at the regional level (half the Hare quota or 1/6 of the party votes) and state level (Hare quota).

== Election results ==
=== Summary ===
Election	Communists KPÖ+ / KPÖ			Social Democrats SPÖ			Greens GRÜNE			NEOS NEOS / LiF			People's ÖVP			Freedom FPÖ		
Election	Votes	%	Seats	Votes	%	Seats	Votes	%	Seats	Votes	%	Seats	Votes	%	Seats	Votes	%	Seats
2019	697	0.57%	0	17,407	14.16%	0	16,017	13.03%	0	11,047	8.99%	0	58,656	47.73%	2	16,687	13.58%	0
2017	705	0.55%	0	25,652	19.88%	0	5,294	4.10%	0	7,786	6.03%	0	51,373	39.82%	1	31,359	24.31%	1
2013	654	0.56%	0	23,205	20.04%	0	18,792	16.23%	0	5,345	4.62%	0	33,396	28.84%	1	23,533	20.32%	0
2008	637	0.54%	0	24,166	20.43%	0	14,699	12.42%	0	1,935	1.64%	0	36,925	31.21%	1	20,733	17.53%	0
2006	798	0.72%	0	27,249	24.69%	1	14,424	13.07%	0				46,707	42.32%	1	13,443	12.18%	0
2002	505	0.44%	0	31,420	27.52%	1	11,791	10.33%	0	1,322	1.16%	0	57,260	50.16%	2	11,861	10.39%	0
1999	328	0.31%	0	27,011	25.77%	1	9,104	8.69%	0	3,937	3.76%	0	32,267	30.78%	1	30,568	29.16%	1
1995	236	0.22%	0	31,055	29.40%	1	6,041	5.72%	0	6,550	6.20%	0	33,734	31.94%	1	26,685	25.26%	1
1994				27,045	27.64%	1	8,010	8.19%	0	6,354	6.49%	0	31,520	32.21%	1	23,159	23.67%	0

=== Detailed ===
==== 2010s ====
===== 2019 =====
Results of the 2019 legislative election held on 29 September 2019:

Party		Votes per district			Total votes	%	Seats
Party		Hal- lein	Salz- burg- Umge- bung	Voting card	Total votes	%	Seats
Austrian People's Party	ÖVP	15,913	42,624	119	58,656	47.73%	2
Social Democratic Party of Austria	SPÖ	5,855	11,482	70	17,407	14.16%	0
Freedom Party of Austria	FPÖ	4,298	12,343	46	16,687	13.58%	0
The Greens – The Green Alternative	GRÜNE	4,080	11,814	123	16,017	13.03%	0
NEOS – The New Austria and Liberal Forum	NEOS	2,742	8,234	71	11,047	8.99%	0
JETZT	JETZT	495	1,224	11	1,730	1.41%	0
KPÖ Plus	KPÖ+	207	483	7	697	0.57%	0
Der Wandel	WANDL	147	503	6	656	0.53%	0
Valid Votes		33,737	88,707	453	122,897	100.00%	2
Rejected Votes		517	1,085	6	1,608	1.29%	
Total Polled		34,254	89,792	459	124,505	78.90%	
Registered Electors		43,516	114,287		157,803		
Turnout		78.72%	78.57%		78.90%		

The following candidates were elected:

- Party mandates - Tanja Graf (ÖVP), 1,329 votes; and Peter Haubner (ÖVP), 3,363 votes.

===== 2017 =====
Results of the 2017 legislative election held on 15 October 2017:

Party		Votes per district			Total votes	%	Seats
Party		Hal- lein	Salz- burg- Umge- bung	Voting card	Total votes	%	Seats
Austrian People's Party	ÖVP	13,860	37,322	191	51,373	39.82%	1
Freedom Party of Austria	FPÖ	8,225	23,046	88	31,359	24.31%	1
Social Democratic Party of Austria	SPÖ	7,915	17,565	172	25,652	19.88%	0
NEOS – The New Austria and Liberal Forum	NEOS	2,003	5,683	100	7,786	6.03%	0
The Greens – The Green Alternative	GRÜNE	1,373	3,854	67	5,294	4.10%	0
Peter Pilz List	PILZ	1,254	3,328	53	4,635	3.59%	0
My Vote Counts!	GILT	330	992	7	1,329	1.03%	0
Communist Party of Austria	KPÖ	197	500	8	705	0.55%	0
Free List Austria	FLÖ	173	381	2	556	0.43%	0
The Whites	WEIßE	132	198	2	332	0.26%	0
Valid Votes		35,462	92,869	690	129,021	100.00%	2
Rejected Votes		425	1,027	5	1,457	1.12%	
Total Polled		35,887	93,896	695	130,478	83.08%	
Registered Electors		43,433	113,627		157,060		
Turnout		82.63%	82.64%		83.08%		

The following candidates were elected:

- Personal mandates - Marlene Svazek (FPÖ), 5,319 votes.
- Party mandates - Peter Haubner (ÖVP), 3,607 votes.

Substitutions:

- Marlene Svazek (FPÖ) resigned on 12 June 2018 and was replaced by Volker Reifenberger (FPÖ) on 13 June 2018.

===== 2013 =====
Results of the 2013 legislative election held on 29 September 2013:

Party		Votes per district			Total votes	%	Seats
Party		Hal- lein	Salz- burg- Umge- bung	Voting card	Total votes	%	Seats
Austrian People's Party	ÖVP	9,099	24,214	83	33,396	28.84%	1
Freedom Party of Austria	FPÖ	6,214	17,264	55	23,533	20.32%	0
Social Democratic Party of Austria	SPÖ	7,928	15,221	56	23,205	20.04%	0
The Greens – The Green Alternative	GRÜNE	4,929	13,730	133	18,792	16.23%	0
Team Stronach	FRANK	1,556	4,524	17	6,097	5.27%	0
NEOS – The New Austria	NEOS	1,310	4,000	35	5,345	4.62%	0
Alliance for the Future of Austria	BZÖ	1,015	2,909	18	3,942	3.40%	0
Pirate Party of Austria	PIRAT	220	599	4	823	0.71%	0
Communist Party of Austria	KPÖ	189	455	10	654	0.56%	0
Valid Votes		32,460	82,916	411	115,787	100.00%	1
Rejected Votes		850	2,017	9	2,876	2.42%	
Total Polled		33,310	84,933	420	118,663	77.10%	
Registered Electors		42,833	111,076		153,909		
Turnout		77.77%	76.46%		77.10%		

The following candidates were elected:

- Party mandates - Peter Haubner (ÖVP), 2,262 votes.

==== 2000s ====
===== 2008 =====
Results of the 2008 legislative election held on 28 September 2008:

Party		Votes per district			Total votes	%	Seats
Party		Hal- lein	Salz- burg- Umge- bung	Voting card	Total votes	%	Seats
Austrian People's Party	ÖVP	9,494	27,077	354	36,925	31.21%	1
Social Democratic Party of Austria	SPÖ	7,995	15,958	213	24,166	20.43%	0
Freedom Party of Austria	FPÖ	5,550	15,029	154	20,733	17.53%	0
Alliance for the Future of Austria	BZÖ	4,259	10,591	111	14,961	12.65%	0
The Greens – The Green Alternative	GRÜNE	3,679	10,696	324	14,699	12.42%	0
Fritz Dinkhauser List – Citizens' Forum Tyrol	FRITZ	517	1,546	23	2,086	1.76%	0
Liberal Forum	LiF	473	1,413	49	1,935	1.64%	0
Independent Citizens' Initiative Save Austria	RETTÖ	235	799	4	1,038	0.88%	0
The Christians	DC	273	732	15	1,020	0.86%	0
Communist Party of Austria	KPÖ	190	438	9	637	0.54%	0
Left	LINKE	58	46	1	105	0.09%	0
Valid Votes		32,723	84,325	1,257	118,305	100.00%	1
Rejected Votes		1,044	2,352	16	3,412	2.80%	
Total Polled		33,767	86,677	1,273	121,717	81.97%	
Registered Electors		41,357	107,135		148,492		
Turnout		81.65%	80.90%		81.97%		

The following candidates were elected:

- Party mandates - Konrad Steindl (ÖVP), 2,304 votes.

===== 2006 =====
Results of the 2006 legislative election held on 1 October 2006:

Party		Votes per district			Total votes	%	Seats
Party		Hal- lein	Salz- burg- Umge- bung	Voting card	Total votes	%	Seats
Austrian People's Party	ÖVP	11,744	32,412	2,551	46,707	42.32%	1
Social Democratic Party of Austria	SPÖ	8,793	17,184	1,272	27,249	24.69%	1
The Greens – The Green Alternative	GRÜNE	3,371	9,656	1,397	14,424	13.07%	0
Freedom Party of Austria	FPÖ	3,606	9,399	438	13,443	12.18%	0
Hans-Peter Martin's List	MATIN	871	2,539	146	3,556	3.22%	0
Alliance for the Future of Austria	BZÖ	874	2,501	134	3,509	3.18%	0
Communist Party of Austria	KPÖ	222	535	41	798	0.72%	0
EU Withdrawal – Neutral Free Austria	NFÖ	184	483	19	686	0.62%	0
Valid Votes		29,665	74,709	5,998	110,372	100.00%	2
Rejected Votes		866	2,064	86	3,016	2.66%	
Total Polled		30,531	76,773	6,084	113,388	80.31%	
Registered Electors		39,453	101,738		141,191		
Turnout		77.39%	75.46%		80.31%		

The following candidates were elected:

- Party mandates - Stefan Prähauser (SPÖ), 1,783 votes; and Konrad Steindl (ÖVP), 2,877 votes.

===== 2002 =====
Results of the 2002 legislative election held on 24 November 2002:

Party		Votes per district			Total votes	%	Seats
Party		Hal- lein	Salz- burg- Umge- bung	Voting card	Total votes	%	Seats
Austrian People's Party	ÖVP	14,501	40,499	2,260	57,260	50.16%	2
Social Democratic Party of Austria	SPÖ	10,148	20,205	1,067	31,420	27.52%	1
Freedom Party of Austria	FPÖ	3,033	8,521	307	11,861	10.39%	0
The Greens – The Green Alternative	GRÜNE	2,759	7,888	1,144	11,791	10.33%	0
Liberal Forum	LiF	299	955	68	1,322	1.16%	0
Communist Party of Austria	KPÖ	165	316	24	505	0.44%	0
Valid Votes		30,905	78,384	4,870	114,159	100.00%	3
Rejected Votes		618	1,451	43	2,112	1.82%	
Total Polled		31,523	79,835	4,913	116,271	86.90%	
Registered Electors		37,550	96,256		133,806		
Turnout		83.95%	82.94%		86.90%		

The following candidates were elected:

- Party mandates - Peter Haubner (ÖVP), 2,657 votes; Stefan Prähauser (SPÖ), 3,074 votes; and Konrad Steindl (ÖVP), 764 votes.

==== 1990s ====
===== 1999 =====
Results of the 1999 legislative election held on 3 October 1999:

Party		Votes per district			Total votes	%	Seats
Party		Hal- lein	Salz- burg- Umge- bung	Voting card	Total votes	%	Seats
Austrian People's Party	ÖVP	8,051	22,568	1,648	32,267	30.78%	1
Freedom Party of Austria	FPÖ	7,980	21,420	1,168	30,568	29.16%	1
Social Democratic Party of Austria	SPÖ	8,610	17,177	1,224	27,011	25.77%	1
The Greens – The Green Alternative	GRÜNE	2,221	6,139	744	9,104	8.69%	0
Liberal Forum	LiF	885	2,629	423	3,937	3.76%	0
The Independents	DU	197	518	32	747	0.71%	0
Christian Voters Community	CWG	103	309	22	434	0.41%	0
No to NATO and EU – Neutral Austria Citizens' Initiative	NEIN	104	304	16	424	0.40%	0
Communist Party of Austria	KPÖ	127	180	21	328	0.31%	0
Valid Votes		28,278	71,244	5,298	104,820	100.00%	3
Rejected Votes		535	1,336	50	1,921	1.80%	
Total Polled		28,813	72,580	5,348	106,741	82.22%	
Registered Electors		36,707	93,121		129,828		
Turnout		78.49%	77.94%		82.22%		

The following candidates were elected:

- Party mandates - Hermann Böhacker (FPÖ), 1,977 votes; Günter Puttinger (ÖVP), 2,083 votes; and Annemarie Reitsamer (SPÖ), 2,059 votes.

Substitutions:

- Annemarie Reitsamer (SPÖ) resigned on 28 February 2001 and was replaced by Stefan Prähauser (SPÖ) on 1 March 2001.
- Günter Puttinger (ÖVP) resigned on 30 November 2001 and was replaced by Peter Haubner (ÖVP) on 3 December 2001.

===== 1995 =====
Results of the 1995 legislative election held on 17 December 1995:

Party		Votes per district			Total votes	%	Seats
Party		Hal- lein	Salz- burg- Umge- bung	Voting card	Total votes	%	Seats
Austrian People's Party	ÖVP	8,677	24,044	1,013	33,734	31.94%	1
Social Democratic Party of Austria	SPÖ	10,414	19,970	671	31,055	29.40%	1
Freedom Party of Austria	FPÖ	7,202	18,973	510	26,685	25.26%	1
Liberal Forum	LiF	1,448	4,581	521	6,550	6.20%	0
The Greens – The Green Alternative	GRÜNE	1,503	4,042	496	6,041	5.72%	0
No – Civic Action Group; Against the Sale of Austria	NEIN	332	967	23	1,322	1.25%	0
Communist Party of Austria	KPÖ	105	125	6	236	0.22%	0
Valid Votes		29,681	72,702	3,240	105,623	100.00%	3
Rejected Votes		768	1,826	21	2,615	2.42%	
Total Polled		30,449	74,528	3,261	108,238	87.52%	
Registered Electors		35,781	87,888		123,669		
Turnout		85.10%	84.80%		87.52%		

The following candidates were elected:

- Party mandates - Helmut Haigermoser (FPÖ), 1,849 votes; Günter Puttinger (ÖVP), 1,287 votes; and Annemarie Reitsamer (SPÖ), 2,150 votes.

===== 1994 =====
Results of the 1994 legislative election held on 9 October 1994:

Party		Votes per district			Total votes	%	Seats
Party		Hal- lein	Salz- burg- Umge- bung	Voting card	Total votes	%	Seats
Austrian People's Party	ÖVP	8,061	22,177	1,282	31,520	32.21%	1
Social Democratic Party of Austria	SPÖ	9,312	16,844	889	27,045	27.64%	1
Freedom Party of Austria	FPÖ	6,111	16,255	793	23,159	23.67%	0
The Greens – The Green Alternative	GRÜNE	2,066	5,327	617	8,010	8.19%	0
Liberal Forum	LiF	1,465	4,384	505	6,354	6.49%	0
No – Civic Action Group; Against the Sale of Austria	NEIN	256	658	36	950	0.97%	0
Christian Voters Community	CWG	195	423	41	659	0.67%	0
United Greens Austria – List Adi Pinter	VGÖ	44	103	11	158	0.16%	0
Valid Votes		27,510	66,171	4,174	97,855	100.00%	2
Rejected Votes		615	1,624	55	2,294	2.29%	
Total Polled		28,125	67,795	4,229	100,149	82.06%	
Registered Electors		35,555	86,488		122,043		
Turnout		79.10%	78.39%		82.06%		

The following candidates were elected:

- Party mandates - Günter Puttinger (ÖVP), 2,390 votes; and Annemarie Reitsamer (SPÖ), 3,083 votes.
