= Bürmoos =

- Municipality
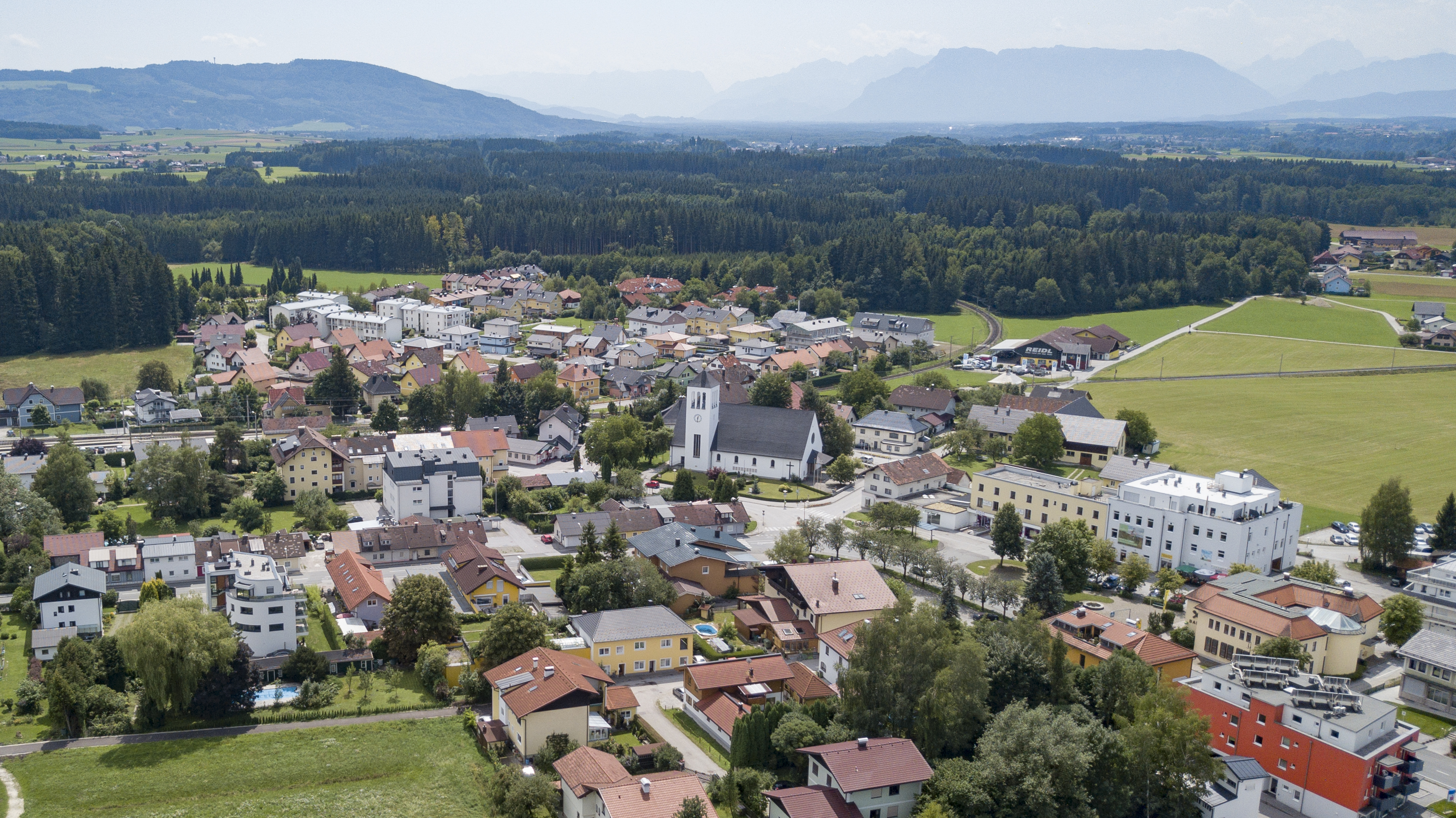

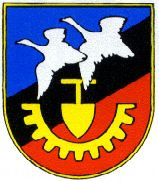
- Coat of arms

- Location within Austria
- Coordinates: 47°59′00″N 12°56′00″E
- Country: Austria
- State: Salzburg
- District: Salzburg-Umgebung

Government
  - Mayor: Peter Eder (SPÖ)

Area
  - Total: 6.95 km^{2} (2.68 sq mi)
- Elevation: 436 m (1,430 ft)

Population (2018-01-01)
  - Total: 4,899
  - Density: 705/km^{2} (1,830/sq mi)
- Time zone: UTC+1 (CET)
  - Summer (DST): UTC+2 (CEST)
- Postal code: 5111
- Area code: 06274
- Vehicle registration: SL
- Website: www.buermoos.at

Bürmoos is a municipality in the district of Salzburg-Umgebung in the state of Salzburg in Austria.

== History ==
Bürmoos was founded in 1967, making it the most recently created municipality in the state, by combining the outskirts of the neighbouring villages Sankt Georgen bei Salzburg and Lamprechtshausen.

At that time, the place had been inhabited for only one hundred years. Until the early 19th century the area had been a bog without any settlements. During the industrialization in the second half of that century, notably by Ignaz Glaser, glass and brick industries were established using the vast reserves of peat as their fuel.

The collapse of these industries after the First World War made the area one of the poorest in the province and, in the wake of the Second World War, a place for the displaced from German speaking areas in Eastern Europe.

Making it an independent municipality of its own in 1967, was accompanied by massive protests by its inhabitants. The impression was given of putting aside a social and political ghetto, in order to save the social and political equilibrium of the conservative villages of origin, Sankt Georgen bei Salzburg and Lamprechtshausen. In consequence the first local elections in Bürmoos brought a landslide victory for the Socialists of more than 85% of the vote.

By the beginning of the 21st century, Bürmoos had become a popular dormitory town for the city of Salzburg with its own basic infra-structure and good public transport.

== See also ==
- Salzburg
- Salzburgerland
- W&H Dentalwerk
