= Grumello del Monte =

- Comune
- Comune di Grumello del Monte
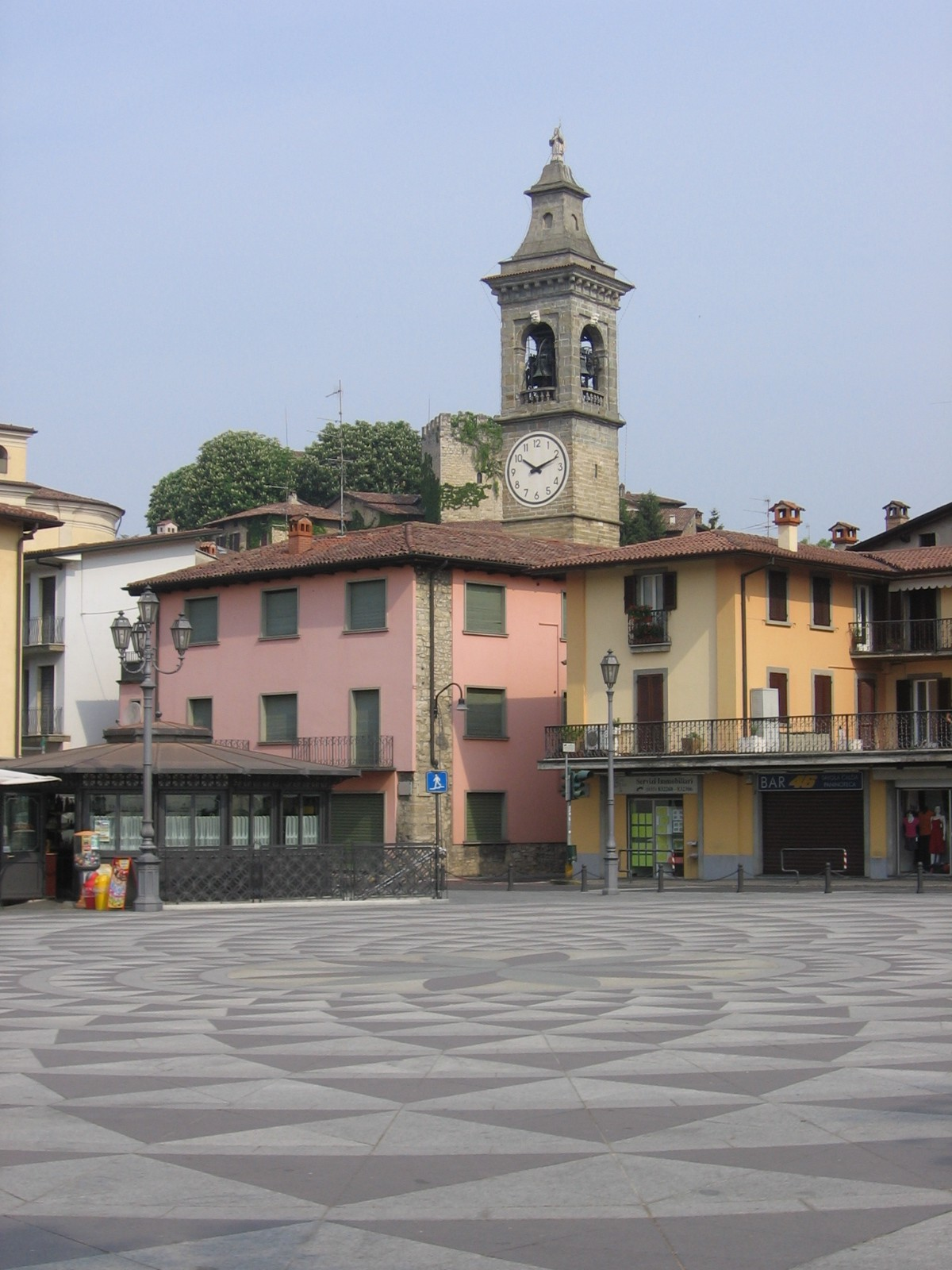
- View of the town centre

- Coat of arms

- Location within Italy Location within Lombardy
- Coordinates: 45°38′N 9°52′E
- Country: Italy
- Region: Lombardy
- Province: Bergamo (BG)
- Frazioni: San Pantaleone, Boldesico

Government
  - Mayor: Simona Gregis

Area
  - Total: 9.94 km^{2} (3.84 sq mi)
- Elevation: 208 m (682 ft)

Population (31 May 2021)
  - Total: 7,338
  - Density: 738/km^{2} (1,910/sq mi)
- Demonym: Grumellesi
- Time zone: UTC+1 (CET)
  - Summer (DST): UTC+2 (CEST)
- Postal code: 24064
- Dialing code: 035
- Patron saint: Holy Trinity
- Saint day: June 20

Grumello del Monte (Bergamasque: Grömèl del Mùt) is a comune (municipality) of about 7,400 inhabitants in the province of Bergamo in the Italian region of Lombardy, located about 60 kilometres (37 mi) northeast of Milan and about 15 kilometres (9 mi) southeast of Bergamo.

Grumello del Monte borders the following municipalities: Carobbio degli Angeli, Castelli Calepio, Chiuduno, Gandosso, Palazzolo sull'Oglio, Telgate.

== History ==
The village's origins date from the Roman domination, as attested by the name, deriving from Latin grumus (hill). The castle was probably built in the 10th century AD.

== Main sights ==
- The medieval castle, turned into a residence by Bartolomeo Colleoni in the 14th century.
- Parish church (1720).
- Sanctuary of the Madonna del Buon Consiglio (15th century)
- Church of San Pantaleone.

== Twin towns ==
Grumello del Monte is twinned with:

- Eymet, France
- Militello Rosmarino, Italy
