= Capriolo =

Capriolo Cavriöl
- Comune
- Comune di Capriolo
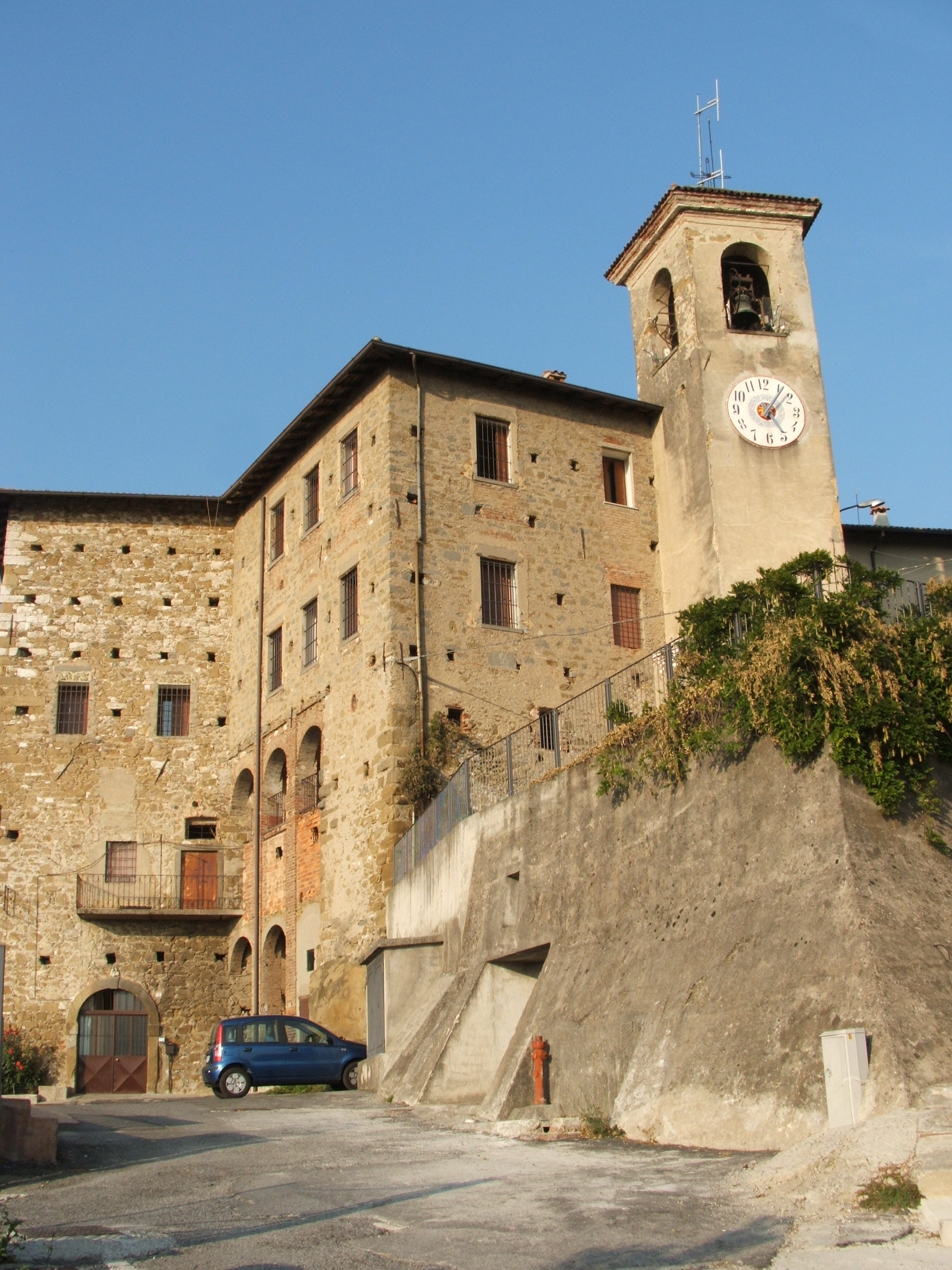
- Castle

- Coat of arms

- Location within Italy Location within Lombardy
- Coordinates: 45°38′20″N 9°56′2″E
- Country: Italy
- Region: Lombardy
- Province: Province of Bergamo (BS)

Government
  - Mayor: Luigi Vezzoli (since 2019-05-27)

Area
  - Total: 16 km^{2} (6.2 sq mi)

Population (2011)
  - Total: 9,371
  - Density: 590/km^{2} (1,500/sq mi)
- Demonym: Capriolesi
- Time zone: UTC+1 (CET)
  - Summer (DST): UTC+2 (CEST)
- Postal code: 25031
- Dialing code: 030
- Patron saint: St. George on 23 April
- Saint day: 23 April
- Website: Official website

Capriolo (Brescian: Cavriöl) is a town and comune in the Italian province of Brescia, in Lombardy. It is situated on the left bank of the river Oglio, southwest of Lago d'Iseo.
