= Bagnatica =

- Comune
- Comune di Bagnatica
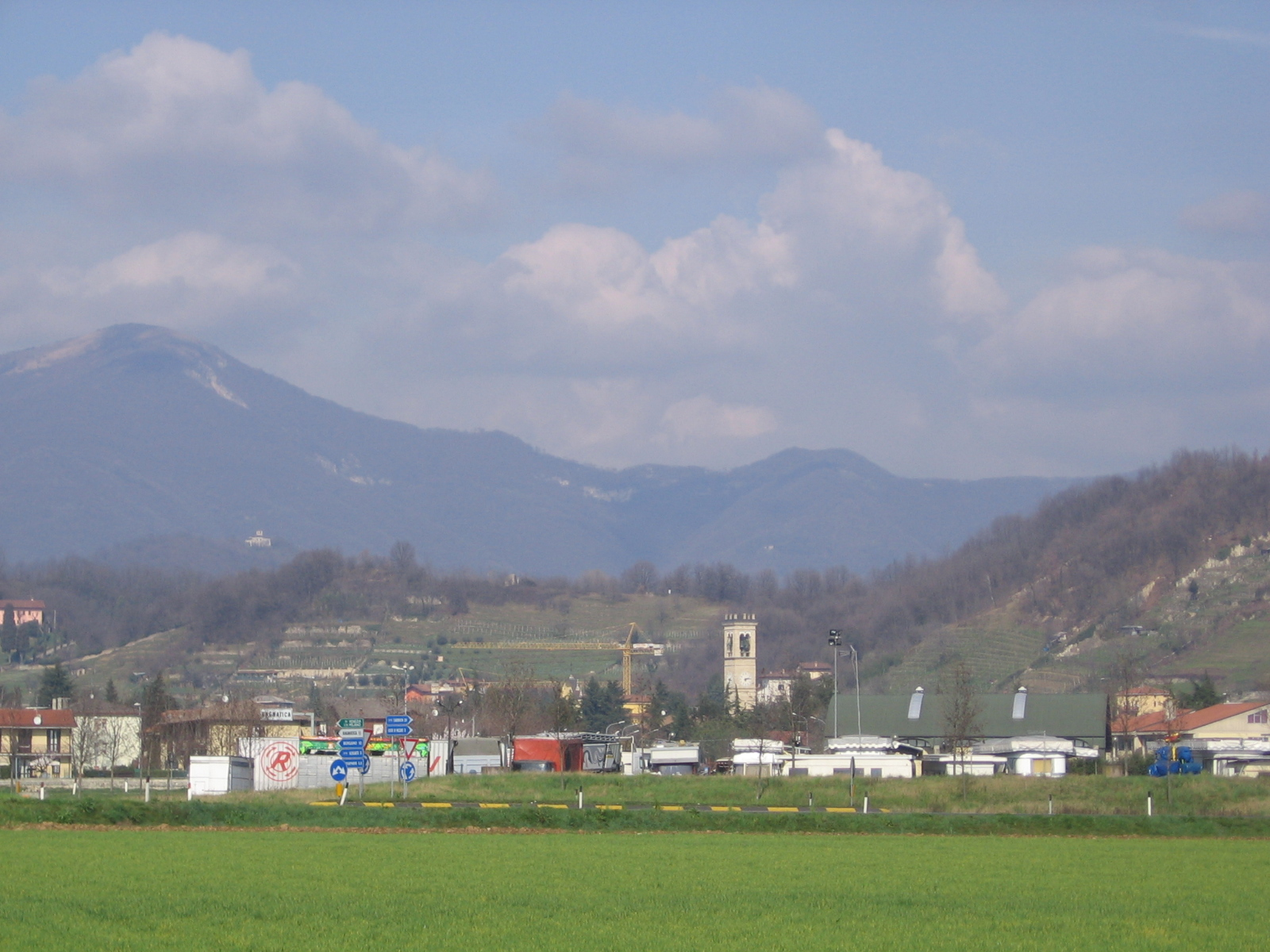
- View of Bagnatica

- Coat of arms

- Location within Italy Location within Lombardy
- Coordinates: 45°40′N 9°47′E
- Country: Italy
- Region: Lombardy
- Province: Bergamo (BG)

Government
  - Mayor: Primo Magli

Area
  - Total: 6.2 km^{2} (2.4 sq mi)
- Elevation: 220 m (720 ft)

Population (28 February 2017)
  - Total: 4,329
  - Density: 700/km^{2} (1,800/sq mi)
- Demonym: Bagnatichesi
- Time zone: UTC+1 (CET)
  - Summer (DST): UTC+2 (CEST)
- Postal code: 24060
- Dialing code: 035
- Patron saint: St. John the Baptist
- Saint day: 24 June
- Website: Official website

Bagnatica (Bergamasque: Bagnàdega) is a comune (municipality) in the Province of Bergamo in the Italian region of Lombardy, located about 50 kilometres (31 mi) northeast of Milan and about 10 kilometres (6 mi) southeast of Bergamo.
