= Extraparliamentary parties involved in the 2008 Austrian legislative election =

2008 Austrian legislative election
← 2006	28 September 2008	Next →

183 seats in the National Council of Austria 92 seats were needed for a majority
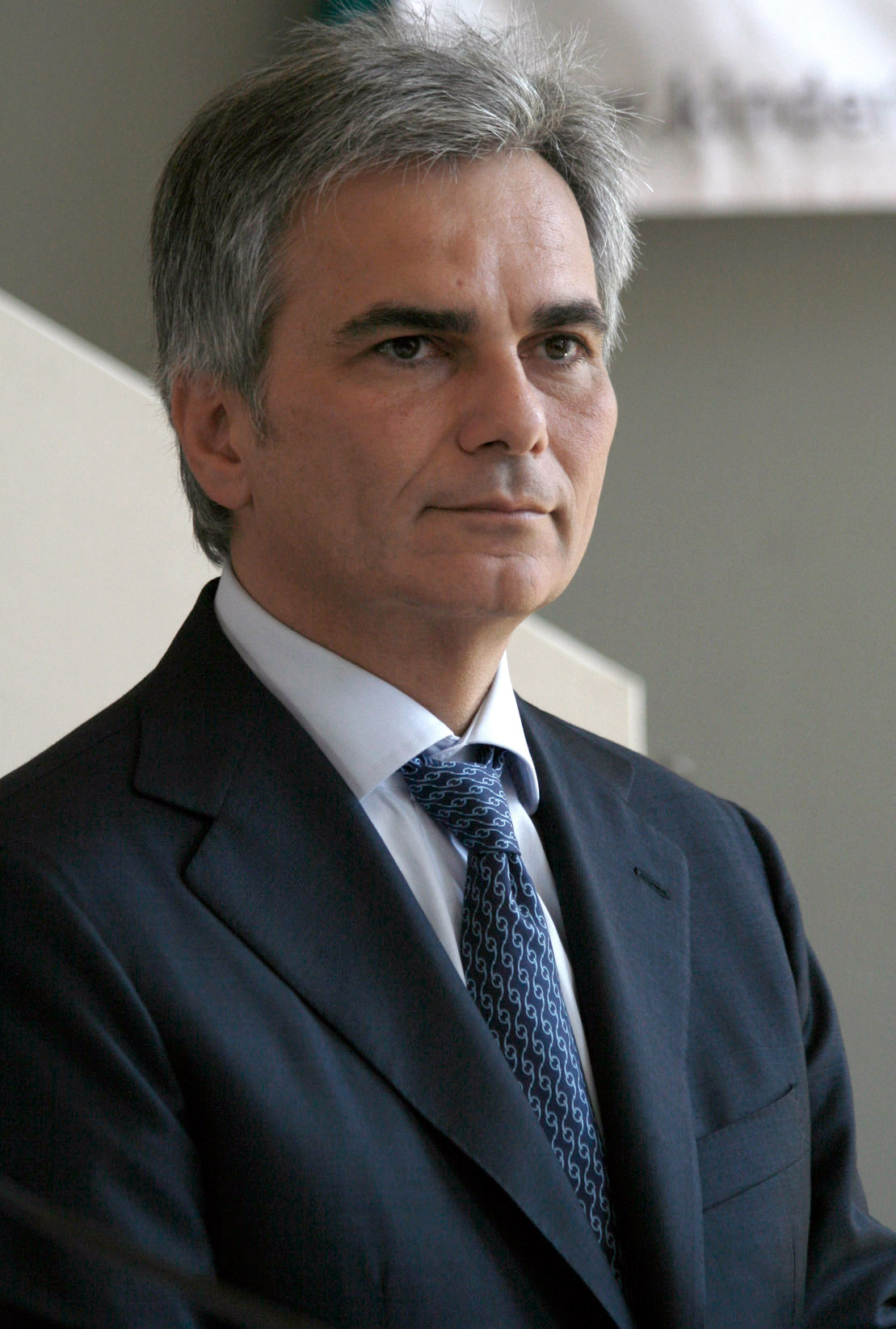

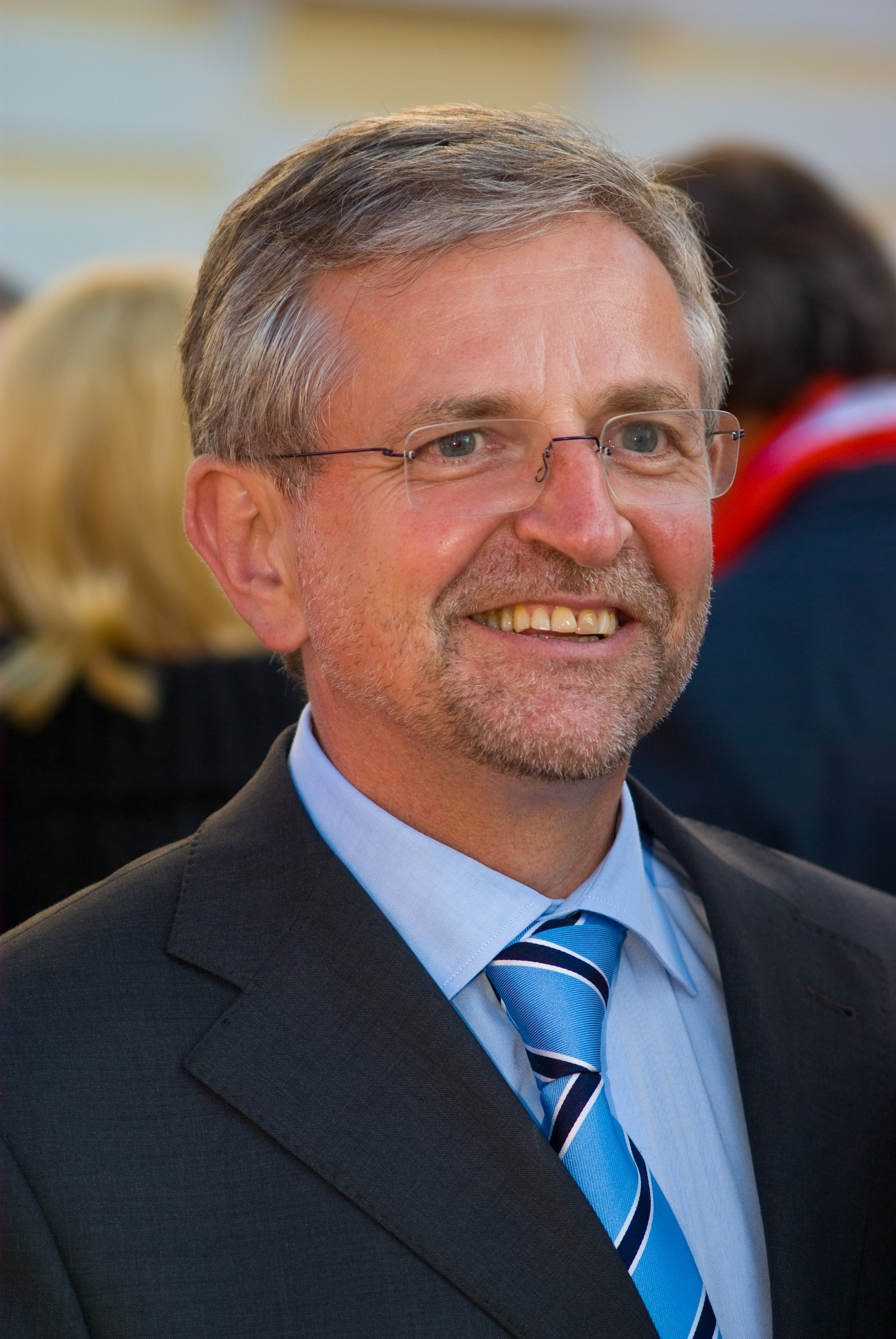

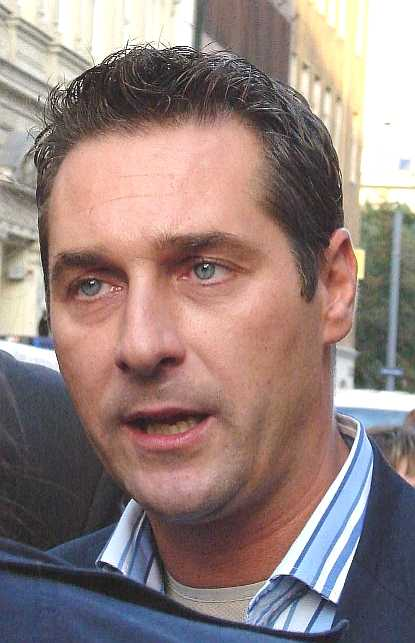

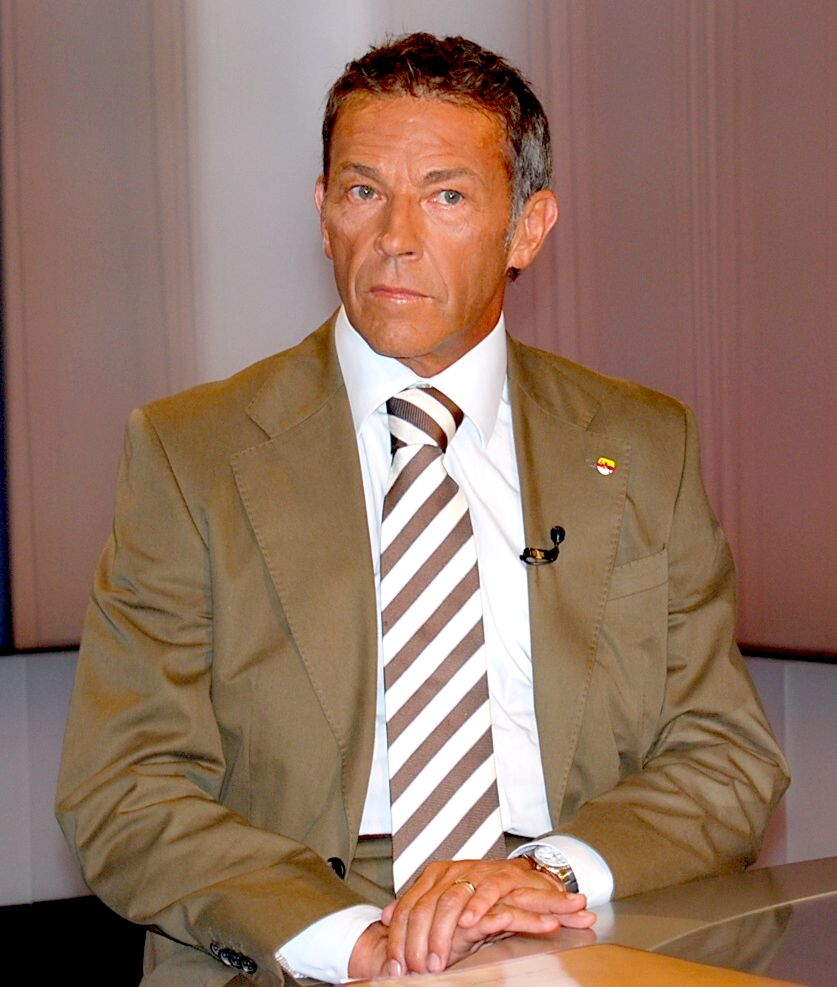

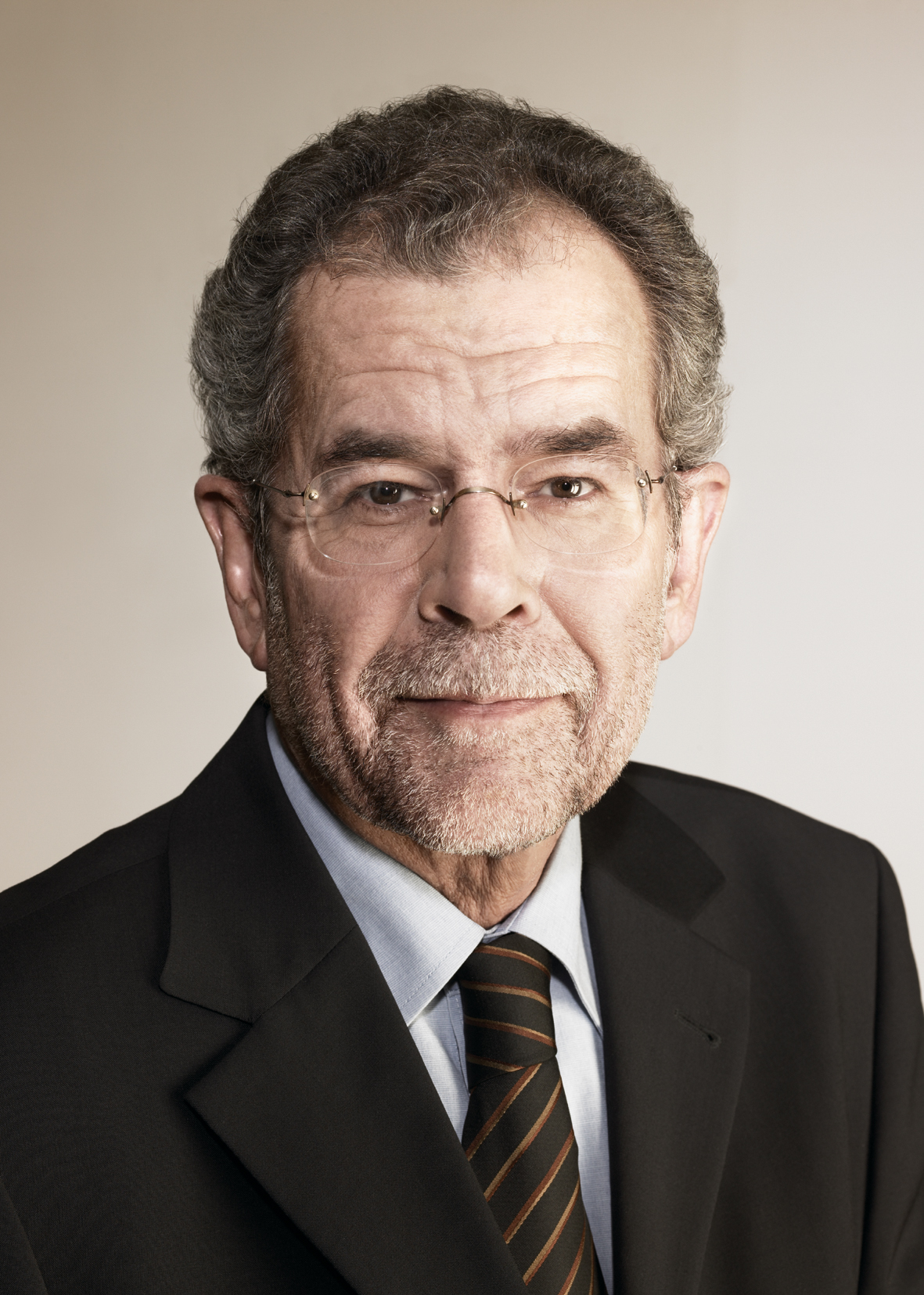

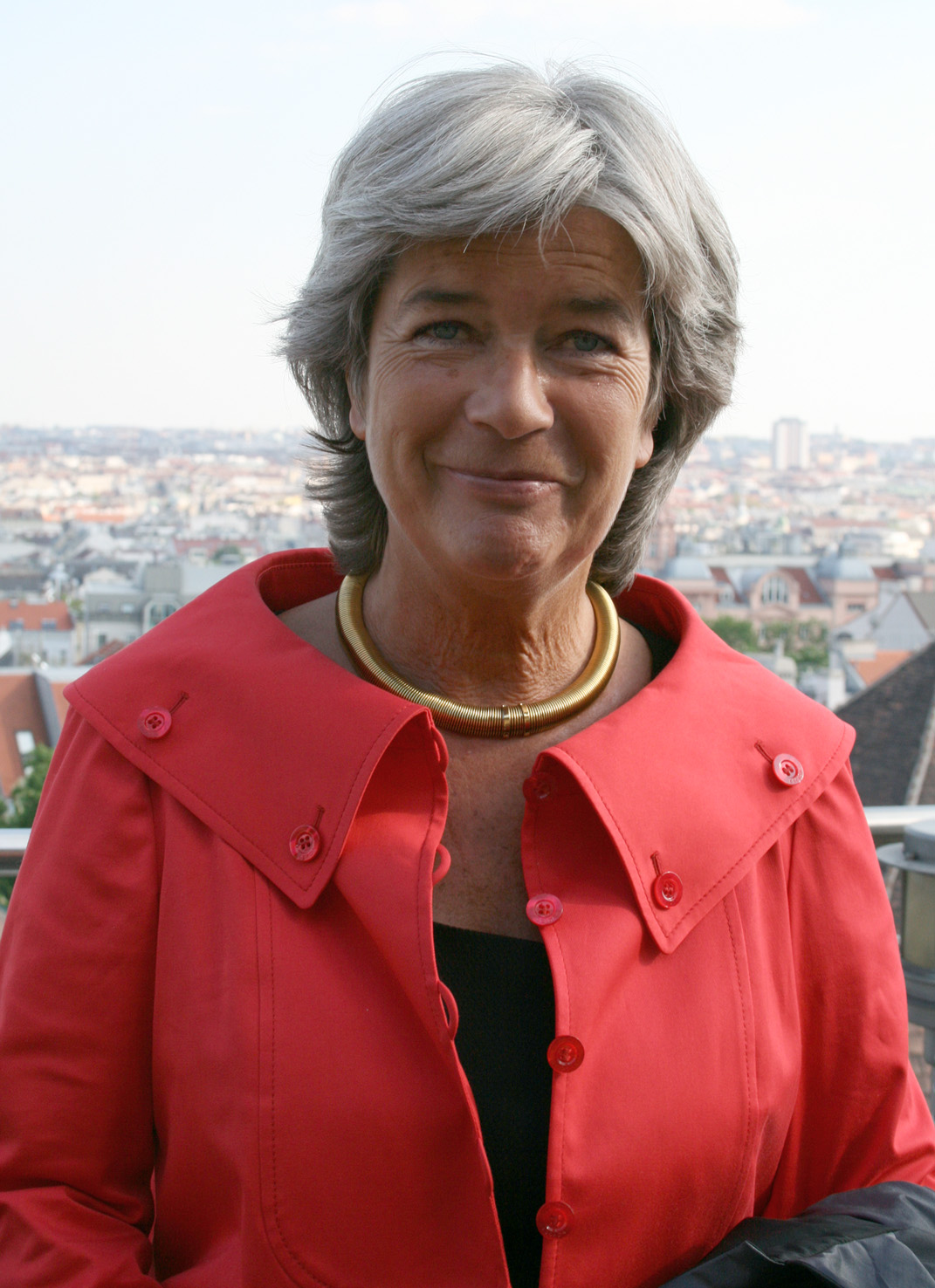
	First party	Second party	Third party
Leader	Werner Faymann	Wilhelm Molterer	Heinz-Christian Strache
Party	SPÖ	ÖVP	FPÖ
Leader since	2008	2007	2005
Leader's seat	9 Vienna	4D Traunviertel	9D Vienna South
Last election	68 seats, 35.34%	66 seats, 34.33%	21 seats, 11.04%
Seats won	57	51	34
Seat change	▼11	▼15	▲13
Popular vote	1,430,206	1,269,656	857,029
Percentage	29.26%	25.98%	17.54%
Swing	▼6.08%	▼8.35%	▲6.50%
	Fourth party	Fifth party	Sixth party
Leader	Jörg Haider	Alexander Van der Bellen	Heide Schmidt
Party	BZÖ	Greens	LiF
Leader since	2008	1997	2008
Leader's seat	2A Klagenfurt	9F Vienna North-West	9F Vienna North-West
Last election	7 seats, 4.11%	21 seats, 11.05%	did not contest on their own
Seats won	21	20	0
Seat change	▲14	▼1	0
Popular vote	522,933	509,936	102,249
Percentage	10.70%	10.43%	2.09%
Swing	▲6.59%	▼0.62%	▲2.09%
Chancellor before election
Alfred Gusenbauer
SPÖ
Elected Chancellor
Werner Faymann
SPÖ

A legislative snap election for the National Council in Austria was held on 28 September 2008. The previous election was held on 1 October 2006. The election (the 24th in Austrian history) was caused by the withdrawal of Austrian People's Party leader Wilhelm Molterer from the governing grand coalition (led by the Social Democratic Party of Austria) on 7 July 2008. Due to dissatisfaction with the grand coalition and the two main parties, it was widely expected to be a realigning election, with gains for the opposition and up to seven parties expected to be in the National Council after the election. The losses for the government parties (both the SPÖ and the ÖVP had the worst election result in history) resulted in strong gains for the far right, while neither the Liberal Forum nor the Citizens' Forum Austria (both of which were considered to have chances of gaining seats) gained as much as 2% of the vote, defying earlier expectations. The result of the election was seen as strong for the far-right and in support of Eurosceptics.

Molterer resigned as party chairman as a result of the losses suffered by the ÖVP and was replaced by environment minister Josef Pröll; the Greens' federal spokesman Alexander Van der Bellen (in office since 1997) also resigned and was replaced by his deputy, Eva Glawischnig. Due to the LIF's failure to enter parliament on its own, LIF founder Heide Schmidt and financier Hans-Peter Haselsteiner both declared their complete withdrawal from politics, and the LIF's fate was seen as uncertain. Shortly after the election, BZÖ leader and Carinthian governor Jörg Haider died in a car accident.

== Parties ==
=== Extraparliamentary parties ===
Apart from the five parties represented in parliament with their own parliamentary groups (SPÖ, ÖVP, Greens, FPÖ, BZÖ) and the Communist Party of Austria, which has contested all elections in Austria since 1945, a number of other parties stated they planned to or were considering contesting the election. Parties require either the signatures of 3 MPs or the signatures 2,600 citizens (proportionally divided among the different states: 100 in Burgenland and Vorarlberg, 200 in Carinthia, Salzburg and Tyrol, 400 in Styria and Upper Austria and 500 in Lower Austria and Vienna) between 29 July 2008 and 22 August 2008 in order to stand. The signatures have to come from citizens who are eligible to vote in the election; one can only support one party per election through one's signature, and the statement of support has to be signed at the town hall in front of an official. In addition, parties have to pay a fee of €435 to cover printing costs in each state, for a total of €3,915 to contest the election in all states.

==== Liberal Forum ====
The Liberal Forum, represented in parliament from 2006 to 2008 by Alexander Zach as a single MP in the SPÖ's parliamentary group thanks to a pre-election agreement with the SPÖ prior to the 2006 election, announced it would contest the election, though it did not initially state whether Zach, LIF founder Heide Schmidt or well-known manager Hans-Peter Haselsteiner would be leading the electoral list; analysts asserted that either Schmidt or Haselsteiner would have to be the main candidate in order for the LIF to have a chance of gaining the required 4%. Analysts were divided on whether the LIF had a chance of entering parliament. The LIF announced, after preparatory party meetings on 12 July, and 13 July 2008, that it was structurally and financially prepared to contest the election, but that the decision on whether it would actually participate hinged on the location of appropriate candidates; on 15 July 2008, the LIF announced it would stand, and that it would officially announce its main candidate by,28 July 2008. On 23 July 2008 it was announced that the leading candidate had been determined, and that a presentation of the political program and the candidate list would take place on 25 July 2008. On 25 July 2008 it was announced that Schmidt would lead the LIF into the elections, and that Haselsteiner would be the economy spokesman. The election campaign budget was announced to be €1.5 million.

It was announced on 30 July 2008 that Rudi Vouk, lawyer and activist of the Carinthian Slovenes, one of the most outspoken critics of Jörg Haider, would be the leading candidate of the LIF in Carinthia and would be the LIF's constitutional law spokesman. Vouk is also a member of the Enotna lista, which announced its support for the LIF; it had also previously been a partner of the LIF in the 1990s. The BZÖ claimed the candidacy of Vouk amounted to a "declaration of war" against them. Marion Kitzberger, the founder of the Linzer Lernwerkstatt, was announced to be the LIF's leading candidate in Upper Austria and the family and social issues spokeswoman. Zach also stated he would not rule out supporting a minority government after the election. Maria Schaffenrath was announced as the LIF's leading candidate in Tyrol and its women's issues and education spokeswoman, David Loidolt as defence spokesman and leading candidate in Burgenland (he called for the abolition of conscription) and lateral hire Christine Szalay as leading candidate in Vorarlberg. The Viennese list, led by Schmidt and Zach themselves, also featured youth issues spokeswoman Daphne Frankl, justice spokesman Alexander Hofmann, budget and finances spokesman Peter Unger and science and research spokesman Ronald J. Pohoryles. The leading candidate in Lower Austria and spokesman for art, culture, communication and the environment was Rudolf Berger, former director of the Vienna Volksoper, and the leading candidate in Styria was Gabriele Metz. The national list also featured Stefan Gara, an expert in energy and climate protection and the new LIF spokesman for this field.

Besides Schmidt and Haselsteiner, there were unconfirmed rumours that two other people might appear as LIF candidates: former justice minister Karin Gastinger, who left the BZÖ over Westenthaler's comments about deportation about immigrants in the 2006 election campaigning, and Josef Broukal, the former ORF newsanchor who joined the SPÖ, became its university spokesman and left shortly after the early elections were called (because the SPÖ decided not to abolish university tuition fees together with Greens and FPÖ, deciding to adhere to the coalition pact signed with the ÖVP despite the ÖVP's decision to withdraw from the coalition). Former short-time LIF leader Christian Köck had also been mentioned as a possible candidate.

MEP Karin Resetarits, who was elected on Hans-Peter Martin's List in the 2004 European Parliament election, but later fell out with him and joined the LIF, announced on 17 July 2008 she would participate in the campaign, but did not want to go into national Austrian politics as she wanted to serve out her term in the European Parliament until June 2009 (if she were to resign, the mandate would next have to be offered to the next person on the electoral list of Hans-Peter Martin's List in 2004). On 21 August 2008 she was announced as the LIF's leading candidate in Salzburg and as its European Union spokeswoman. It was also announced on that date that former SPÖ member of the students' council Barbara Blaha, who left the SPÖ over its failure to abolish university tuition fees, had been approached by the LIF, but that Blaha had declined to join the LIF.

The LIF announced on 19 August 2008 that it had gathered the necessary signatures to contest the election in all of Austria, becoming the first extraparliamentary party to do so.

The new website of the LIF was presented on 1 September 2008.

In early September 2008, Haselsteiner was criticised (especially by Green MP Pilz) for allegedly having subsidised political parties in Hungary in exchange for public contracts for his company Strabag SE. Haselsteiner denied all accusations and in turn strongly criticised Pilz. In mid-September 2008, Zach was accused of having lobbied for EADS, the company behind the Eurofighter Typhoon fighter airplane, while officially opposing them; Zach initially rejected these accusations, but then conceded that he had worked for EADS. He emphasised that he had strictly separated this lobbying activity from his political career. Nonetheless, the LIF held a meeting late on 22 September 2008 to decide the party's reaction to the allegations. On 23 September 2008, Zach announced his resignation as LIF party leader, as an MP and as its candidate in the elections, while still rejecting all allegations. Schmidt took over as LIF party leader. David Nekula (SPÖ) replaced Zach as an MP in the outgoing parliament, as Zach was elected on the SPÖ's list in 2006. Analysts differed whether the EADS issue would hurt the LIF's chances to enter parliament or not.

==== Citizens' Forum Austria, Save Austria and the Whites of Austria ====
The Citizens' Forum Austria of Fritz Dinkhauser (the short name is FRITZ), which had just become the second-largest party in Tyrol in the Tyrolean state election on 8 June 2008, announced it would contest the election, although it was not initially decided whether nationally or only in Tyrol. Dinkhauser expected his movement to be joined by unionists, economists, mayors and doctors from across the country. Leading members of the ÖVP demanded that Dinkhauser should leave the ÖVP, of which he still was a member, if he ran against them nationally. Later statements indicated Dinkhauser would not be expelled from the ÖVP to avoid making a martyr of him. However, due to the ÖVP's party statutes, Dinkhauser effectively left the ÖVP of his own will by accepting a political mandate from another party, which he did by becoming a state MP for his Citizens' Forum Tyrol in the Tyrolean Landtag. It was not clear how many Tyrolean ÖVP members joined the FRITZ together with Dinkhauser, but the number was reported to be very high. The name of the list was announced as "Citizens' Forum Austria – Fritz Dinkhauser's List" (Bürgerforum Österreich – Liste Fritz Dinkhauser). Dinkhauser formally decided on 28 July 2008 that he would contest the election, as it was widely assumed that he would, since he had secured the necessary financial backing.

Dinkhauser had secured the cooperation of the Free Citizens' Lists (Freie Bürgerlisten, a group of former FPÖ members) in Burgenland, and had reportedly got strong backing in Styria as well, with rumours of a participation of fellow ÖVP rebel Gerhard Hirschmann (who failed to enter the Landtag in the 2005 election in Styria) in his list. Hirschmann stated he supported Dinkhauser, but would not participate personally. Upper Austrian farmer rebel Leo Steinbichler also supported Dinkhauser. Dinkhauser's main Tyrolean ally Gurgiser stated, however, that he thought the national candidacy was a mistake and that he would certainly stay in Tyrol. At a later date, it was reported that one of Dinkhauser's most important supporters (who declined to be named, but was assumed to be Gurgiser) was strongly against turning the Citizens' Forum Tyrol into a national party, as he saw it as far more important to establish it as the primary opposition to the ÖVP in Tyrol instead. The election campaign budget was announced to be €2.5 million, making it the largest budget of the extraparliamentary parties; at a later date, it was reported to be only €1 million.

Two migrants' lists, the "New Movement for the Future" (Neue Bewegung für die Zukunft) led by the Austrian Chamber of Labour rebel Adnan Dincer in Vorarlberg and the small "List for Our Lower Austria" (Liste für unser Niederösterreich) were reportedly interested in cooperation, though Dincer stated he wouldn't stand in the election but just offer his support to Dinkhauser. Furthermore, there had been rumours about contacts with former finance minister Karl-Heinz Grasser. A group of doctors and medics in opposition to the health system reform called "The Whites of Austria" (Die Weißen Österreichs, DWÖ, initially just "The Whites", Die Weißen) led by Eva Raunig were reportedly also in contact with Dinkhauser, but later announced they would not work together with him and were considering an independent candidacy; subsequently Raunig announced they would be supporting him, but another leading member contradicted her.

Former presidential candidate (in the 1998 election) and pro-neutrality activist Karl Walter Nowak's anti-EU initiative "Save Austria" (Rettet Österreich) announced it would contest the election and was reported to be in contact with the FRITZ; it claimed to have the Kronen Zeitung's support, and was assumed to have controversial jurist Adrian Hollaender as its main candidate instead of Nowak, as Nowak's controversial books had proven to be counterproductive in his past attempts at politics, although this turned out to have been a rumour. It was initially unclear whether there would be a joint list with Dinkhauser, but in the end Save Austria decided to stand on its own, after Dinkhauser had refused to cooperate with them (reportedly, Dinkhauser refused to grant Nowak a place on the candidate lists which would guarantee him a seat in the National Council). Save Austria announced on 20 August 2008 that it had gathered the necessary signatures. It said it would not have a leading candidate in the traditional sense, but that party founder Wilfried Auerbach would be first on their national lists, with Nowak also in a leading position; they also stated they would prefer to stay in the opposition and work constructively and that their goal was to reach the electoral threshold of 4%. The short name of the party was announced to be RETTÖ.

MEP Hans-Peter Martin, who had failed to get into parliament in the 2006 election with 2.8% (below the electoral threshold of 4%), was considering whether his Hans-Peter Martin's List would contest the election or not; he had ruled out joining forces with Save Austria, stating that he was "critical of the EU, but pro-European", whereas they were "anti-European", but it was considered possible that Martin would join forces with Dinkhauser, as they had reportedly got strong personal connections. A first meeting was held on 12 July 2008; Dinkhauser stated he had not yet been contacted by Nowak, while Martin still ruled out cooperation with Nowak. Following this meeting, there were rumours that Martin could stay in the European Parliament and only offer his support to Dinkhauser. Before another meeting could be held on 16 July 2008, Martin announced he would not run in the election; Dinkhauser and Martin stated that there had been no disagreement between them and that they had the same goals, but that Martin had decided he could continue his work more efficiently in the European Parliament. Martin did, however, also criticise the lack of organisational structure behind Dinkhauser's movement. Dinkhauser said "one had to accept" Martin's decision to concentrate on his work in the EU.

On 29 July 2008, Dinkhauser announced that he would contest the elections, but also stated that neither Save Austria nor the Free Citizens' Lists would be contesting the election together with him; the Free Citizens' Lists stated they would, however, support Dinkhauser financially and with collecting the necessary signatures. Save Austria decided to contest the election on its own instead. The Whites of Austria did not immediately announce their plans (they were considering running independently, which they claimed had been their plan all along), but criticised Dinkhauser in many points and claimed that they would certainly have more success than Hackl's SKÖ or the LIF; Raunig later announced on 7 August 2008 that they would be supporting Dinkhauser after all, as they had the feeling he understood their issues and due to the fact that it was difficult to attain competence in all fields of politics on their own, but Raunig's announcement was then contradicted on 8 August 2008 by another spokesman, who said they would neither support Dinkhauser nor the LIF and that they had not yet decided whether they would contest the election on their own or not. On 16 August 2008, they started gathering signatures, but announced on 21 August 2008 that they had failed to collect the necessary amount.

Dinkhauser's goal were 4%–7% of the vote. Dinkhauser claimed on 2 August 2008 that he had already got party structures and an organisational apparatus ready in seven states, all except Carinthia and Vorarlberg. In Styria, Dinkhauser presented the first four candidates on 5 August 2008: two doctors, a former unionist and Karl Zotter, an activist opposing a new power line in eastern Styria. The Viennese leading candidate was former FPÖ and BZÖ member Theresia Zierler.

Dinkhauser was reportedly offered the signatures of three MPs (rumours said from the ÖVP and the Greens), which he refused, preferring to gather signatures like the other parties without their own parliamentary group instead; the ÖVP denied that it had offered Dinkhauser any kind of support. On 19 August 2008, when it appeared that Dinkhauser was facing difficulties gathering the necessary signatures (especially in Vienna), he stated he would possibly accept the offer. He stated on 21 August 2008, however, that the three MPs had retracted their offer and that it would be a very close affair whether he would be able to contest the election nationally. While he had originally stated he would withdraw his candidacy if he did not succeed in gathering the necessary signatures in all nine states, he stated on 22 August 2008 that he might consider contesting the election even if he failed to gather the last fifty missing signatures in Salzburg by the deadline. By midday on 22 August 2008, Dinkhauser had gathered the remaining signatures.

During the election campaign, a number of notable members of the Faction of Christian Unionists (Fraktion Christlicher Gewerkschafter) voiced their support for Dinkhauser. Dinkhauser has stated that he was very sceptical regarding a possible coalition with the FPÖ or the BZÖ, and that he would not be willing to cooperate with the ÖVP as long as Schüssel remained active.

==== Communist Party of Austria and Left ====
Following moves to create a new left-wing party (the working title was "Left Project", Linksprojekt, and the official name which was later announced was "Left", LINKE) it was considered possible that there would be a common left-wing list similar to the German The Left, but it was not known whether there would be enough time for a unification of left-wing forces to occur; the Communist Party of Austria in principle had already decided to contest the election on its own, while the Socialist Left Party (SLP) had stated it wanted to pursue this project – however, when further inquired, the KPÖ had not ruled out a cooperation with other left-wing parties and groups. In the end, the KPÖ decided to run on its own, but with an open list for other left-wing activists and groups – the KPÖ also stated it fully supported the creation of a new left-wing party, but that there was not enough time before the election; the Left decided on 19 July 2008 that it would run on its own; the main candidate remained to be determined. The Left announced it would campaign for expropriation of the upper ten thousand, for more occupational health and safety and for better integration (including offering free courses in the main languages of immigrants, e.g. Turkish and Serbo-Croatian). The Left announced on 19 August 2008 that it would not be able to contest the election in all nine states, but that it had succeeded in Salzburg and Vienna and would try to gather the necessary signatures in Burgenland, Tyrol and Upper Austria; it submitted candidate lists in all three states on 22 August 2008, thus contesting the election in five of nine states. SLP member Sonja Grusch was announced to be the leading candidate on the national candidate list on 2 September 2008. The KPÖ called for price regulation to combat inflation and for a new attempt at reforming the healthcare system, which the grand coalition failed to implement. The campaign leaders were the party's two federal spokespersons, Mirko Messner and Melina Klaus. The KPÖ announced on 20 August 2008 that it had gathered the necessary signatures to stand in all nine states.

==== The Christians ====
The Christians were also intending to contest the election; they had previously contested the Lower Austrian and Tyrolean state elections in the same year. Their main campaign promise had in all cases been a strengthening of Christian values and an explicit "no" to equal rights for homosexual couples. They announced they had gathered the necessary signatures on 20 August 2008. The Christians' leading candidate is the lawyer and party founder Alfons Adam; their main campaign topics will be marriage, family and opposition abortion rights. In interviews, he repeatedly criticised gender mainstreaming as a "new state religion" which attempts "to abolish man and woman as biological genders"; he repeatedly stated that homosexuality was "a disease" (and accused criticism of that position as being "like the persecution of Christians") and that sex education in schools only served to "encourage fornication and sexual excesses and thus cause inability to form relationships, drug addiction and excessive criminality". He further stated that he would abolish the women's ministry and replace it with a "real" family ministry.

==== Other parties ====
Twelve other minor parties also announced their intention to contest the election, and two of them succeeded in submitting candidate lists for the election by the deadline in one state. In addition, former FPÖ MP Karlheinz Klement (expelled from the FPÖ in August 2008) contested the election in Carinthia on his own list, see above.

List Strong (Liste Stark), a minor party led by Johann Ehman and active only in Carinthia, which had contested the 2006 election (also only in Carinthia) and had gained 312 votes there, also submitted a candidate list for the 2008 election.

The "Animal Rights Party" (Tierrechtspartei, TRP), which had contested the Lower Austrian state election (although only in Mödling, where it got 854 votes and became the strongest minor party with 1.34% locally), succeeded in collecting the necessary signatures to contest the election in Vienna. It is led by Ralph Chaloupek.

The Pirate Party of Austria, which had already unsuccessfully tried to stand in the 2006 election but failed to gather the necessary signatures, intended to contest the 2008 election.

Actor Karlheinz Hackl announced he might contest the election with a newly founded party called "Solidary Culture of Austria" (Solidarische Kultur Österreichs, SKÖ; the name was also sometimes reported to be "Social Culture of Austria", Soziale Kultur Österreichs). His main themes would have been culture, education, social issues, immigration and Europe, and he wanted to become stronger than Strache's FPÖ; he also stated he would not lead a usual election campaign, but that he would "sing, dance and tell stories" instead. As of early August 2008, he still had not got a website, but he was reported to be gathering signatures nonetheless. Despite acknowledging that he was unlikely to be able to contest the election, he stated he had personally received much support and would try to contest the Viennese state elections in 2009 next. On 5 September 2008, Hackl officially announced his support for the LIF.

An internet platform called "Party3" (Partei3) was founded to contest the election; its main aim was to be the third party in either an SPÖ–Greens or an ÖVP–Greens government and to introduce a number of projects which would be drafted and decided by all of its members over the internet. As of early August 2008, the project seemed to have become inactive.

The monarchist movement Black-Yellow Alliance (Schwarz-Gelbe Allianz) announced on 25 July 2008 it wanted to contest the election. The SGA have not yet announced a leading candidate. Their aims were to reintroduce the monarchy through a referendum in 2018, installing a monarch with a "strong veto right". On 21 August 2008, they announced they had not succeeded in gathering the necessary signatures in Burgenland, Carinthia and Lower Austria and would therefore not contest the election.

A number of other minor parties also wanted to contest the election: a list called "Humans Austria" (Menschen Österreich) led by Johann Klawatsch, a humanist party called "WE (WIR), a list of immigrants called "Democratic Diversity of Austria" (Demokratische Diversität Österreichs, DDÖ) which declared on 11 August 2008 it wanted to contest the election and a movement calling for directly democratic decisions on all laws, "plattform-direkt.at" (PD) – although the latter only intends to stand in Vienna. The DDÖ announced on 21 August 2008 it would not contest the election, despite having received some support and even having been offered the signatures of three MPs, but that they would prepare themselves for European Parliament and Viennese state elections in 2009 instead and announce their support for another party in September; they announced their support for the SPÖ, the Greens and the LIF on 23 September 2008.

A movement called "I DON'T VOTE" (ICH WÄHLE NICHT) wanted to participate in order for non-voters to have an effect on the election outcome, as well. It wanted to reform the electoral law so that an amount of the seats proportional to the rate of abstention would be left empty.

The minor joke political party Certainly – Absolutely – Independent (Sicher – Absolut – Unabhängig or SAU, which means "sow"; led by Franz Radinger, a municipal councillor from Steindorf am Ossiacher See), which had received 1,514 votes in Carinthia in the 2006 election, also wanted to contest the 2008 election, again only in Carinthia. He withdrew on 21 August 2008 after the 200 signatures he had collected were refused due to new, stricter rules regarding the acceptance of notarially certified signatures.

The only other relevant group which had stood in the last election, the anti-EU movement Neutral Free Austria (Neutrales Freies Österreich), decided not to contest the election and to build up its organisational structures for the next elections instead.

=== Parties' status ===
Contesting the election

- Alliance for the Future of Austria
- Animal Rights Party (Vienna)
- Austrian People's Party
- Citizens' Forum Austria
- Communist Party of Austria
- Freedom Party of Austria
- Karlheinz Klement (Carinthia)
- Left (Burgenland, Salzburg, Tyrol, Upper Austria, Vienna)
- Liberal Forum
- List Strong (Carinthia)
- Save Austria
- Social Democratic Party of Austria
- The Christians
- The Greens – The Green Alternative

Failed to gather the required signatures

- Black-Yellow Alliance
- Certainly – Absolutely – Independent (Carinthia)
- Democratic Diversity of Austria
- Humans Austria
- I DON'T VOTE
- Pirate Party of Austria
- plattform-direkt.at (Vienna)
- Solidary Culture of Austria
- The Whites of Austria
- WE

Declined to run

- Hans-Peter Martin's List
- Neutral Free Austria
- Party3
