= Alexander Tschugguel =

Austrian traditionalist Catholic activist (born 1993)

- Born: 24 June 1993 (age 32); Vienna, Austria
- Occupation: Activist
- Parent: Walter Tschugguel

Alexander Tschugguel (born 24 June 1993) is an Austrian traditionalist Catholic activist who was a founding member of The Reform Conservatives, a defunct Austrian conservative political party that set out to abolish the European Parliament.

Tschugguel received international attention in 2019 for stealing statuettes of the indigenous American goddess Pachamama, displayed in St. Peter’s Basilica during the Amazon synod, and throwing them into the Tiber.

== Biography ==
Alexander's father, Dr. Walter Tschugguel, works as a physician in Vienna.

Tschugguel left the Evangelical Church of the Augsburg Confession in Austria, and converted to Catholicism at fifteen. He is a member of the traditionalist Catholic movement.

Tschugguel was married in 2019 in a wedding officiated by Bishop Athanasius Schneider.

== Activism and views ==
Tschugguel joined the anti-Communist traditionalist Catholic network Tradition, Family, and Property in 2009. He has worked with far right politicians Ewald Stadler (formerly of the Freedom Party of Austria, later legal counsel for Pegida) and Beatrix von Storch (Alternative for Germany), as well as the Catholic activist Hedwig von Beverfoerde (formerly of CDU), in opposing abortion, same-sex marriage in Austria and Germany, and the inclusion of gender studies and sex education in schools in Germany and Austria.

Tschugguel is an anti-immigration activist who declares particular concern with the influx of Muslim refugees into Austria and Germany. He describes his political stance as patriotic and monarchist. He acts as a spokesperson for the Young European Student Initiative, a conservative Christian association originating from the Paneuropean Union. In 2013, he assisted Ewald Stadler with the founding of The Reform Conservatives, a short-lived Austrian conservative political party that aspired to reverse the Maastricht Treaty and abolish the European Parliament.

In 2014, Tschugguel co-organized a bus tour in Germany with von Beverfoerde to campaign against same-sex marriage. In 2018 and 2019, he was the co-organizer of the Vienna March for Life. In May 2019, he organized Rosary for Austria, a Latin Mass and prayer event at the Karlskirche.

On 21 October 2019, Tschugguel and an accomplice stole five statues, reportedly of the Inca fertility goddess Pachamama, from the Church of Santa Maria in Traspontina, and threw them from the Ponte Sant'Angelo into the Tiber. The statues were on display as part of the Amazon Synod taking place in the Vatican. He came forward on 4 November 2019 in a YouTube video. Tschugguel, who had removed the statues believing them to be a violation of the First Commandment, received support from various high-ranking church officials after the incident, including Bishop Anthanasius Schneider, Cardinal Raymond Leo Burke, and Cardinal Walter Brandmüller. Tschugguel's actions were criticized by Cardinal Christoph Schönborn, the Archbishop of Vienna, who called the act "scandalous and outrageous". Since coming forward, Tschugguel went on a speaking tour in the United States organized by LifeSite News, the American Society for the Defense of Tradition, Family, and Property, and Taylor Marshall.

In 2019, Tschugguel founded St. Boniface Institute, a traditionalist Catholic organisation, with the stated goal of fighting paganism and globalism within the church, and to "rally those who do not want to bow down to 'Mother Earth'". Saint Boniface is invoked as an anti-environmentalist figure who cuts down the Donar's Oak to build a church. The institute aims to connect traditionalist Catholic communities in Europe.

In a public address in 2019, Tschugguel alleged that the United Nations and the European Union overstated climate change, and branded it an item of the communist agenda. He praised Donald Trump's withdrawal from the Paris Agreement, and attacked Pope Francis over his concern with the Amazon.

In December 2019, Tschugguel organized a prayer protest outside of St. Stephen's Cathedral in Vienna against the hosting of the Life Ball, an LGBTQ-friendly annual charity event to raise money for HIV and AIDS awareness, by the cathedral. He received support from the excommunicated Archbishop Carlo Maria Viganò.

On 18 January 2020, Tschugguel protested alongside Hedwig von Beverfoerde, Viganò, Roberto de Mattei, and Gabriele Kuby in Munich, demanding "clarity and coherence" and an end to "dissimulation and deception" in the Catholic Church in Germany from Pope Francis and the German Bishops' Conference. Among the organisers, named as Acies Ordinata, were 130 members of Catholic laity from Germany, Austria, Italy, Brazil, Chile, Canada, and the United States.
