= Movement for a Europe of Liberties and Democracy =

Former right-wing European political party

- President: Jacek Włosowicz (acting) (PL)
- Founded: 2011
- Dissolved: 2015
- Headquarters: 18 Rue Cler, 75007 Paris, France
- Ideology: National conservatism Right-wing populism Euroscepticism
- Political position: Right-wing to far-right
- European Parliament group: Europe of Freedom and Democracy
- Political foundation: Foundation for a Europe of Liberties and Democracy

Website
- www.meldeuropa.com (archived)

The Movement for a Europe of Liberties and Democracy (French: Mouvement pour l'Europe des libertés et de la démocratie), abbreviated to MELD, was a national-conservative European political party founded in 2011, composed of parties belonging to the Europe of Freedom and Democracy (EFD) group in the European Parliament, with the notable absence of the UK Independence Party, which was a member of the EFD, but not of the MELD. In 2012, MELD received a grant from the European Parliament of €621,482. Its affiliated European political foundation was the Foundation for a Europe of Liberties and Democracy (FELD), which received a grant of €412,361. Both were headquartered at 18, rue Cler, in Paris, France. The president of the party was Jacek Wlosowicz.

MELD was dissolved in 2015 by the European Parliament due to misuse of EU funding.

== Member parties at dissolution ==
Country	Party	MEPs	National MPs
Austria	The Reform Conservatives	0 / 18	0 / 183
Bulgaria	National Front for the Salvation of Bulgaria	0 / 17	10 / 240
Belgium	Frank Vanhecke (independent)	0 / 22	0 / 150
France	Movement for France	0 / 72	0 / 577
Greece	Popular Orthodox Rally	0 / 22	0 / 300
Poland	United Poland	0 / 51	9 / 460
Slovakia	Slovak National Party	0 / 13	0 / 150

== Former member parties ==
- Denmark - Danish People's Party (joined Alliance of European Conservatives and Reformists)
- Finland - Finns Party (joined Alliance of European Conservatives and Reformists)
- Italy - Lega Nord (joined Movement for a Europe of Nations and Freedom)
- Italy - I Love Italy
- Lithuania - Order and Justice (joined Alliance for Direct Democracy in Europe)

== See also ==
- European political party
- Authority for European Political Parties and European Political Foundations
- European political foundation
