= GZO =

GZO may refer to:

- Gazole railway station, in West Bengal, India
- Generation of the Future of Austria (German: Generation Zukunft Österreich), the youth wing of the Alliance for the Future of Austria
- Nusatupe Airport, in the Solomon Islands
