= The Reform Conservatives =

The Reform Conservatives Die Reformkonservativen (REKOS – Liste Ewald Stadler)
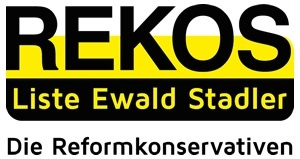
- Leader: Ewald Stadler
- Founded: 23 December 2013
- Dissolved: June 2016
- Split from: Alliance for the Future of Austria
- Headquarters: Mamauer Kellerweg 2 A-3100 St. Pölten
- Ideology: Conservatism; Euroscepticism
- Political position: Right-wing
- European affiliation: Movement for a Europe of Liberties and Democracy (2013-2015)
- Colours: Yellow/Black
- National Council: 0 / 183
- Federal Council: 0 / 62
- European Parliament: 0 / 19

The Reform Conservatives (German: Die Reformkonservativen; REKOS) was a conservative political party in Austria.

The party was launched on 23 December 2013 by Ewald Stadler, a former member of the National Council and eurosceptic MEP for the Freedom Party (FPÖ) and the Alliance for the Future (BZÖ). In the run-up of the 2014 European Parliament election, REKOS formed a joint list with the Christian Party of Austria (CPÖ).

The Reform Conservatives want to abolish the European Parliament and to reverse the 1992 Maastricht Treaty that created the European Union. They plan to cooperate with the right-wing eurosceptic Europe of Freedom and Democracy group.

== Leadership ==
- Ewald Stadler (2014–present)
- Alexander Tschugguel
