= 2009 Salzburg state election =

← 2004	1 March 2009	2013 →

All 36 seats in the Landtag of Salzburg 19 seats needed for a majority
- Turnout: 287,065 (74.4%) ▼2.9%
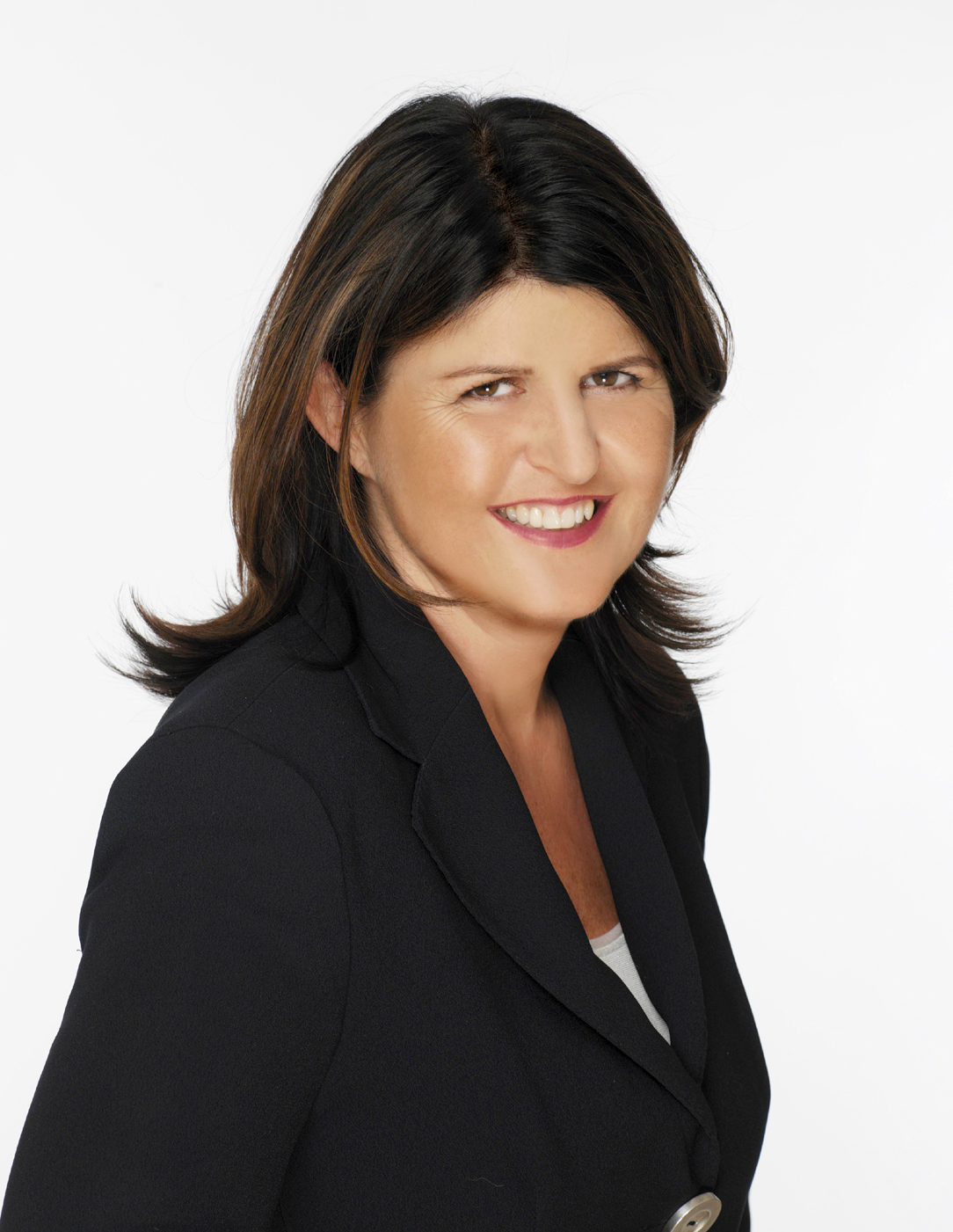

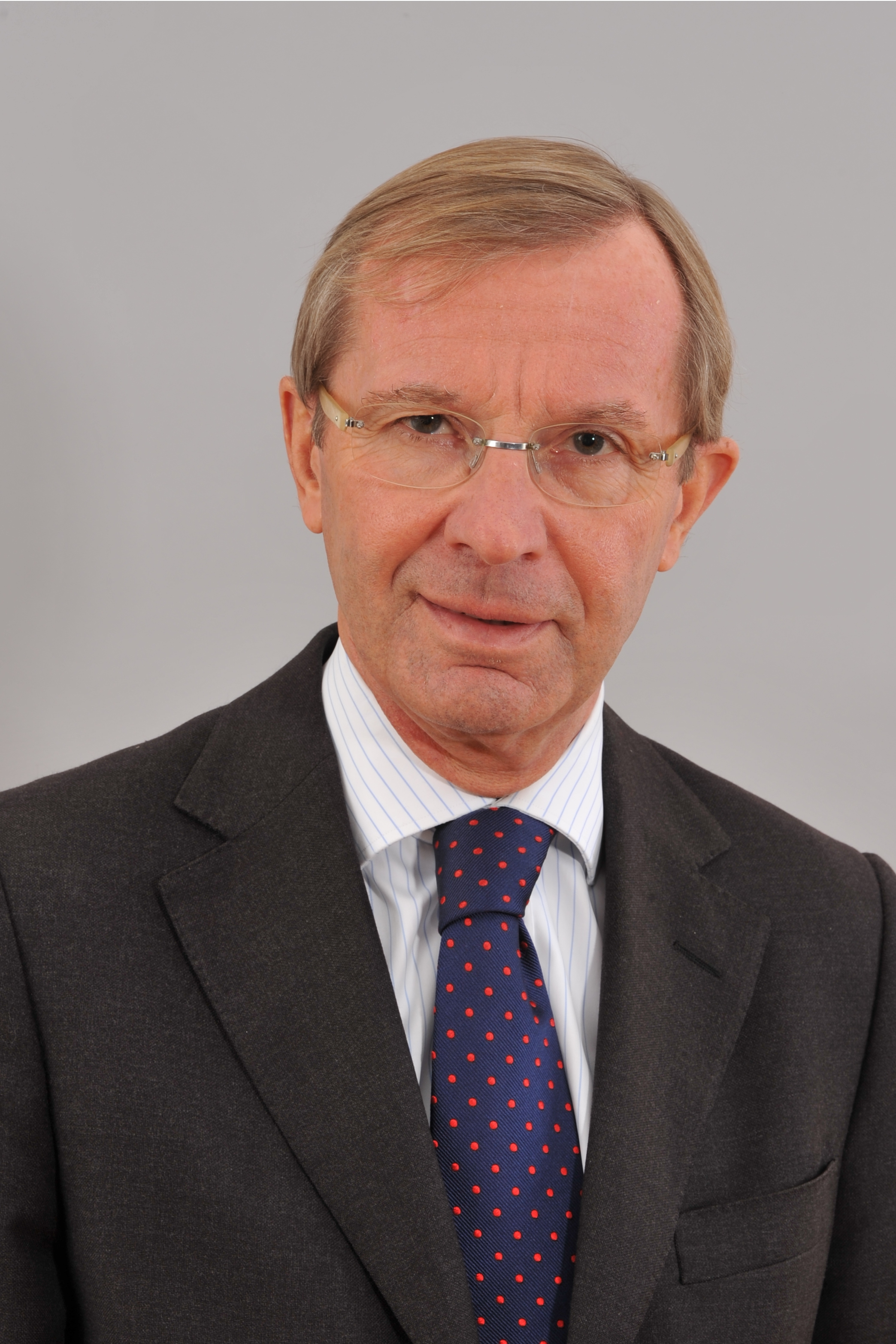

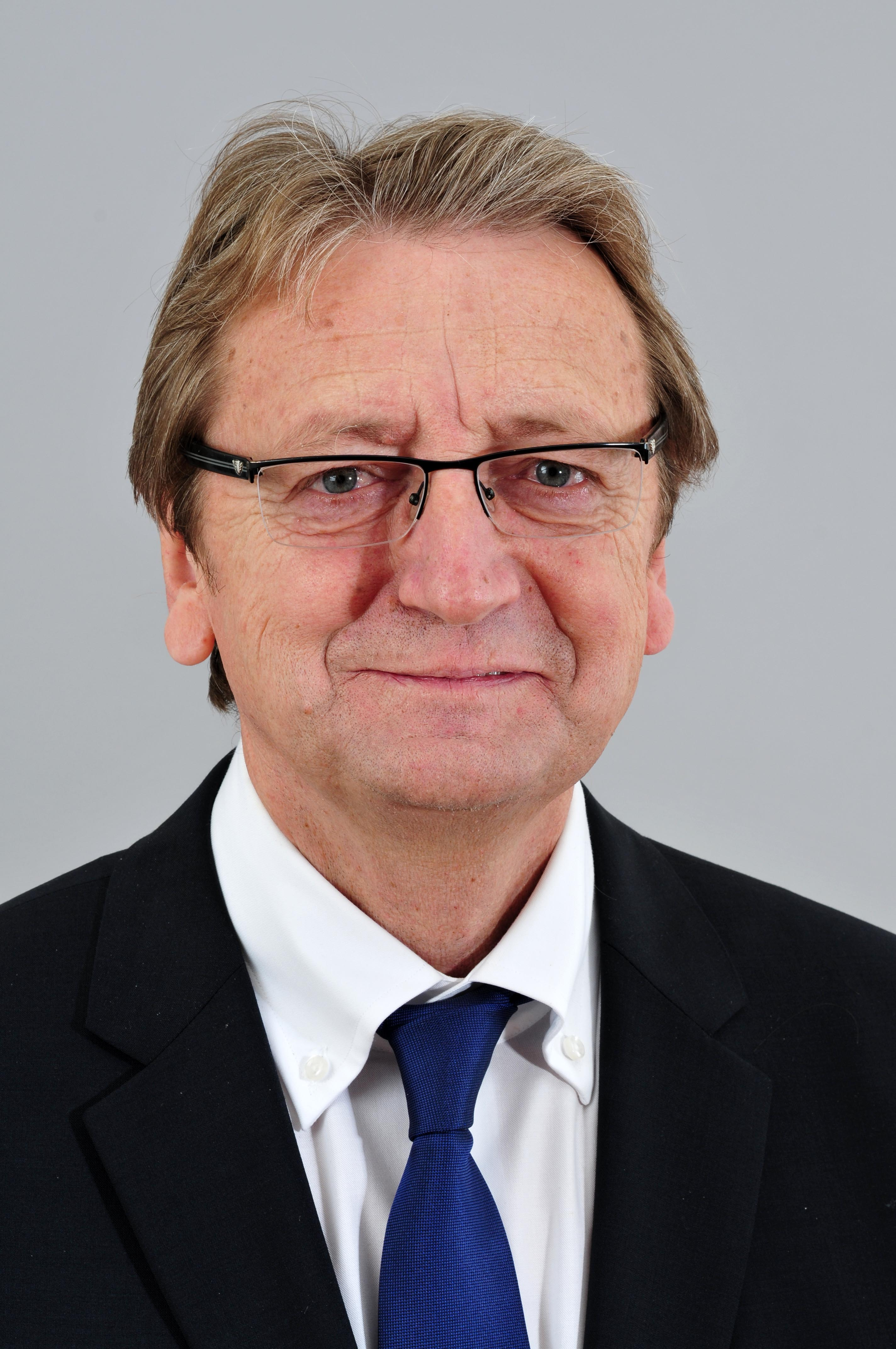

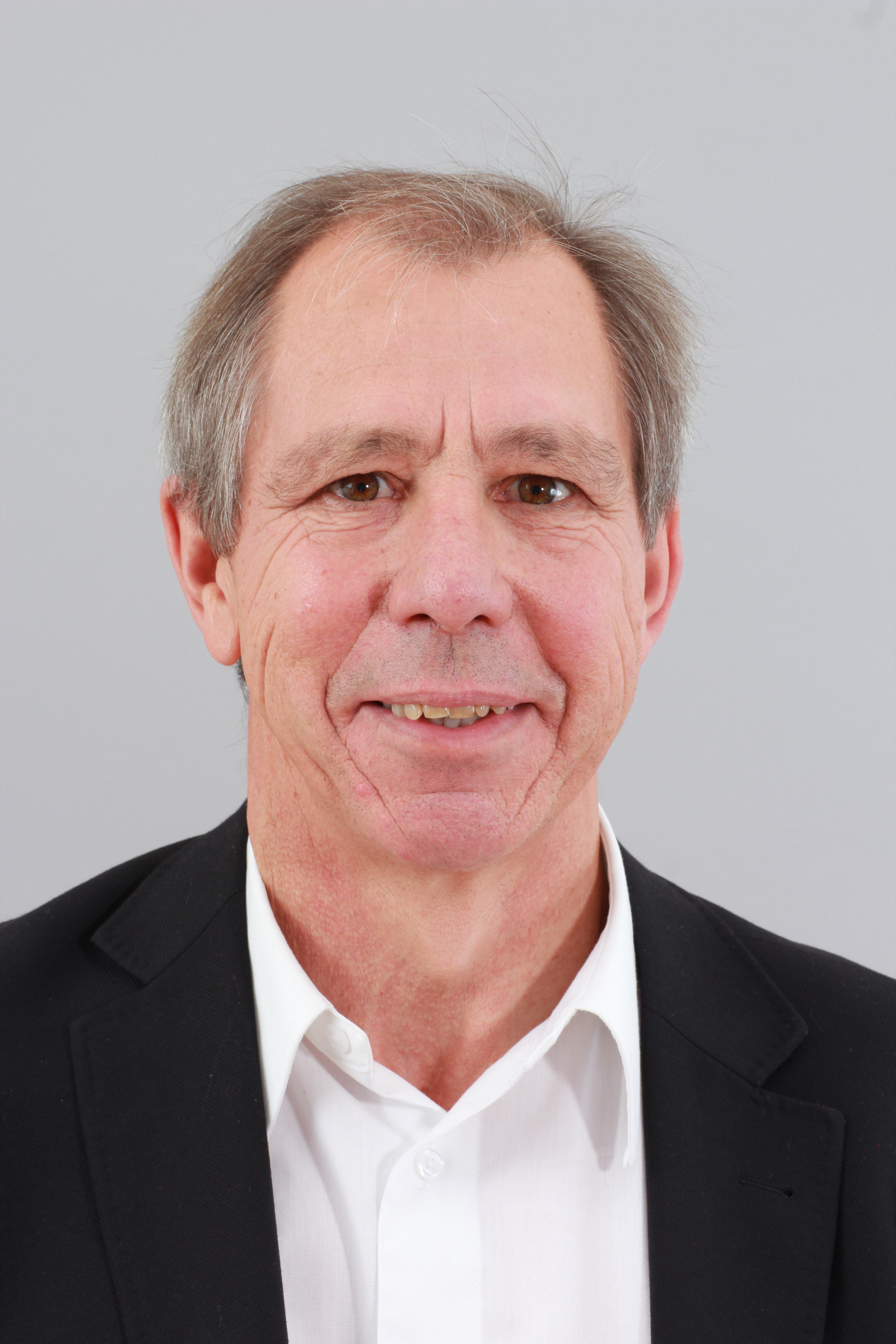
	First party	Second party
Leader	Gabi Burgstaller	Wilfried Haslauer Jr.
Party	SPÖ	ÖVP
Last election	17 seats, 45.4%	14 seats, 37.9%
Seats won	15	14
Seat change	▼2	0
Popular vote	111,485	103,385
Percentage	39.4%	36.5%
Swing	▼6.0%	▼1.4%
	Third party	Fourth party
Leader	Karl Schnell	Cyriak Schwaighofer
Party	FPÖ	Greens
Last election	3 seats, 8.7%	2 seats, 8.0%
Seats won	5	2
Seat change	▲2	0
Popular vote	36,845	20,843
Percentage	13.0%	7.4%
Swing	▲4.3%	▼0.6%
Governor before election
Gabi Burgstaller
SPÖ
Elected Governor
Wilfried Haslauer Jr.
ÖVP

The 2009 Salzburg state election was held on 1 March 2009 to elect the members of the Landtag of Salzburg.

The Social Democratic Party of Austria (SPÖ) remained the largest party but took moderate losses. Its coalition partner the Austrian People's Party (ÖVP) also suffered a small swing against it. The Freedom Party of Austria (FPÖ) recovered somewhat from its 2004 defeat, winning five seats. The Greens remained stable. The SPÖ renewed its coalition with the ÖVP, and Governor Gabi Burgstaller was re-elected for a second term.

== Background ==
In the 2004 election, the SPÖ became the largest party in the Landtag for the first time in post-war history. While the ÖVP suffered only a slight decline, they fell to second place in the face of a major swing to the SPÖ, who captured voters from the FPÖ and Liberal Forum. The FPÖ fell from 20% to under 9%, while the Greens made gains. Gabi Burgstaller subsequently became the first SPÖ governor of Salzburg, in a coalition with the ÖVP.

== Electoral system ==
The 36 seats of the Landtag of Salzburg are elected via open list proportional representation in a two-step process. The seats are distributed between six multi-member constituencies. For parties to receive any representation in the Landtag, they must either win at least one seat in a constituency directly, or clear a 5 percent state-wide electoral threshold. Seats are distributed in constituencies according to the Hare quota, with any remaining seats allocated using the D'Hondt method at the state level, to ensure overall proportionality between a party's vote share and its share of seats.

== Contesting parties ==
The table below lists parties represented in the previous Landtag.

Name		Ideology	Leader	2004 result	
Name		Ideology	Leader	Votes (%)	Seats
SPÖ	Social Democratic Party of Austria; Sozialdemokratische Partei Österreichs	Social democracy	Gabi Burgstaller	45.4%	17 / 36
ÖVP	Austrian People's Party; Österreichische Volkspartei	Christian democracy	Wilfried Haslauer Jr.	37.9%	14 / 36
FPÖ	Freedom Party of Austria; Freiheitliche Partei Österreichs	Right-wing populism Euroscepticism	Karl Schnell	8.7%	3 / 36
GRÜNE	The Greens – The Green Alternative; Die Grünen – Die Grüne Alternative	Green politics	Cyriak Schwaighofer	8.0%	2 / 36

In addition to the parties already represented in the Landtag, one party collected enough signatures to be placed on the ballot:

- Alliance for the Future of Austria (BZÖ)

== Results ==
Party	Votes	%	+/−	Seats	+/−
Social Democratic Party of Austria (SPÖ)	111,485	39.37	–6.03	15	–2
Austrian People's Party (ÖVP)	103,385	36.55	–1.37	14	±0
Freedom Party of Austria (FPÖ)	36,845	13.02	+4.33	5	+2
The Greens – The Green Alternative (GRÜNE)	20,843	7.35	–0.63	2	±0
Alliance for the Future of Austria (BZÖ)	10,477	3.70	New	0	New
Invalid/blank votes	4,030	–	–	–	–
Total	287,065	100	–	36	0
Registered voters/turnout	386,068	74.36	–2.94	–	–
Source: Salzburg State Government

Popular vote
SPÖ	39.37%
ÖVP	36.55%
FPÖ	13.02%
GRÜNE	7.36%
BZÖ	3.70%

Landtag seats
SPÖ	41.67%
ÖVP	38.89%
FPÖ	13.89%
GRÜNE	5.56%

=== Results by constituency ===
Constituency	SPÖ		ÖVP		FPÖ		Grüne		BZÖ		Total seats	Turnout
Constituency	%	S	%	S	%	S	%	S	%	S	Total seats	Turnout
Salzburg City	38.9	3	30.2	2	13.2	1	13.3	1	4.4		7	60.1
Hallein	41.2	1	37.0	1	11.4		6.7		3.7		2	78.8
Salzburg Surrounds	34.8	3	40.1	4	13.0	1	7.9		4.3		8	77.4
St. Johann im Pongau	42.0	2	37.6	1	13.3		4.1		3.0		3	80.5
Tamsweg	38.8		39.9		14.2		3.3		3.7		0	84.2
Zell am See	44.0	2	36.1	2	13.3		4.0		2.5		4	81.0
Remaining seats		4		4		3		1			12	
Total	39.4	15	36.5	14	13.0	5	7.4	2	3.7		36	74.4
Source: Salzburg State Government
