= Hans Jörg Schimanek =

Austrian journalist and politician (1940–2024)

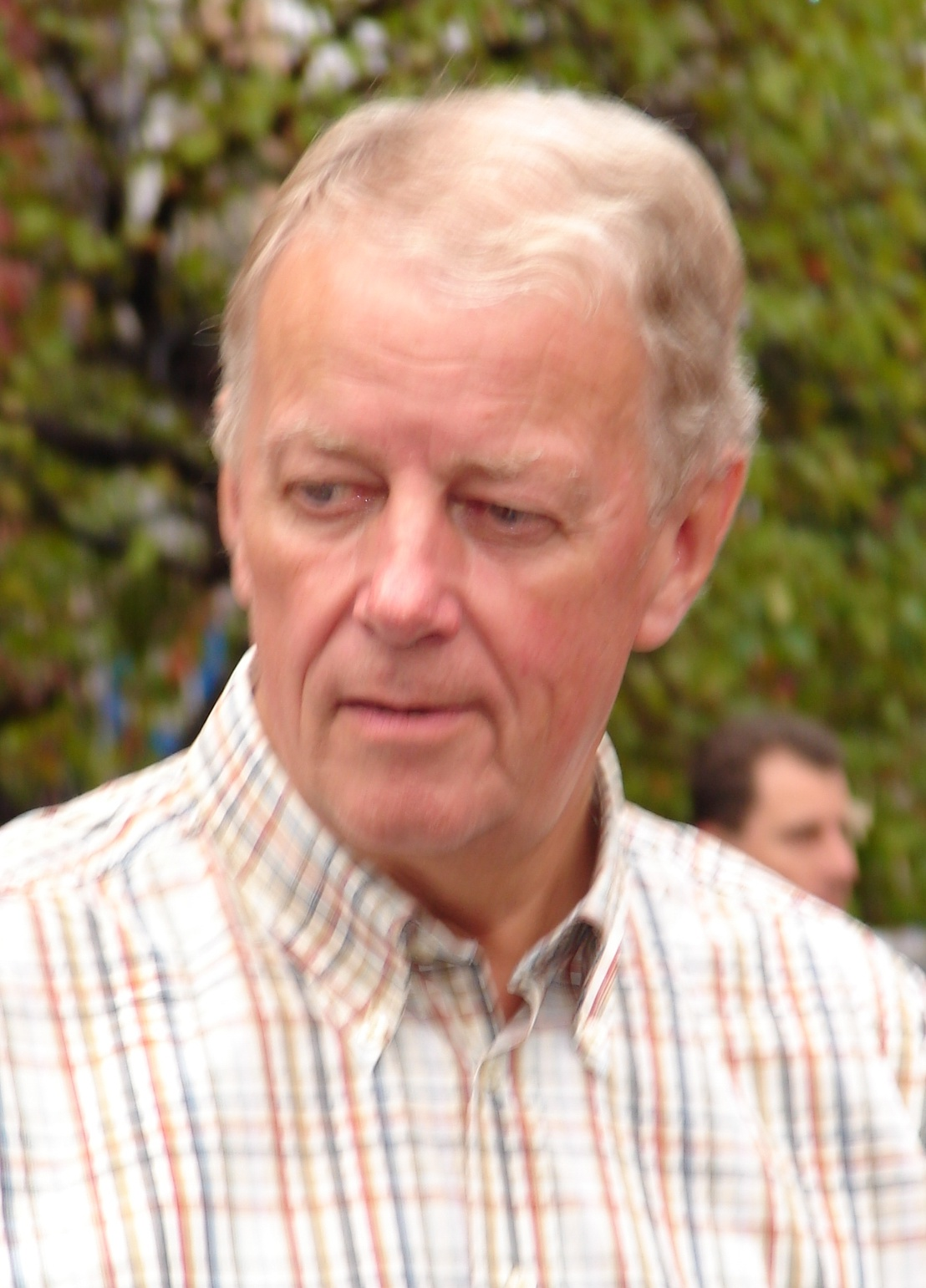
- Schimanek in 2006

Member of the Landtag of Lower Austria
- In office 29 April 1999 – 28 June 2000

Personal details
- Born: 23 March 1940 Vienna, Germany
- Died: 22 December 2024 (aged 84)
- Party: SPÖ; FPÖ; BZÖ; WIFF

Hans Jörg Schimanek (23 March 1940 – 22 December 2024) was an Austrian journalist and politician. A member of multiple political parties, he served in the Landtag of Lower Austria from 1999 to 2000.

Schimanek died on 22 December 2024, at the age of 84.
