= Karin Gastinger =

Austrian politician (born 1964)

Karin Gastinger (born 11 March 1964) is an Austrian politician. She was Federal Minister of Justice in the coalition government led by Wolfgang Schüssel which served from June 2004 to January 2007.

She was born Karin Miklautsch in Graz, Styria, and, after graduating from law school, became a lawyer with the Carinthian government, where she was appointed head of the Department of Water Law in 1999.

In the autumn of 2004, still unknown to most Austrians, Gastinger was nominated by Jörg Haider, the governor of Carinthia, and his Freedom Party of Austria (FPÖ), as successor to Dieter Böhmdorfer, the Minister of Justice who had just stepped down. Gastinger had never been a member of the Freedom Party, and she remained parteifrei on being sworn in as Federal Minister of Justice. During her term of office, Gastinger gained quite a lot of recognition as a competent politician despite her initial inexperience.

When, in April 2005, Haider split from the FPÖ and formed the Alliance for the Future of Austria (BZÖ), Gastinger eventually became a member of the newly formed party. During the election campaign leading up to the parliamentary elections to be held on 1 October 2006, she was Spitzenkandidatin (top of the list) of Styria for the BZÖ. However, on 25 September, only six days before the election, she announced her defection from the BZÖ.
