= Generation of the Future of Austria =

Generation of the Future of Austria Generation Zukunft Österreich (GZÖ)
- Chairperson: Marc Pommer-Gutschy
- Founded: August 2005
- Headquarters: Volksgartenstrasse 3/5; 1010 Vienna, Austria
- Ideology: Conservative liberalism
- Mother party: Alliance for the Future of Austria
- Website: www.gzoe.at

The Generation of the Future of Austria (German: Generation Zukunft Österreich), abbreviated to GZÖ, is the youth wing of the Alliance for the Future of Austria, a conservative liberal political party in Austria.

The party was formed in August 2005 by a unification of youth groups from various states.

The GZÖ has called for the introduction of tuition fees of €500 per term and a €5,000 registration fee refundable upon graduation.
