= Alexander Zach =

Austrian politician (born 1976)(LiF/SPÖ)

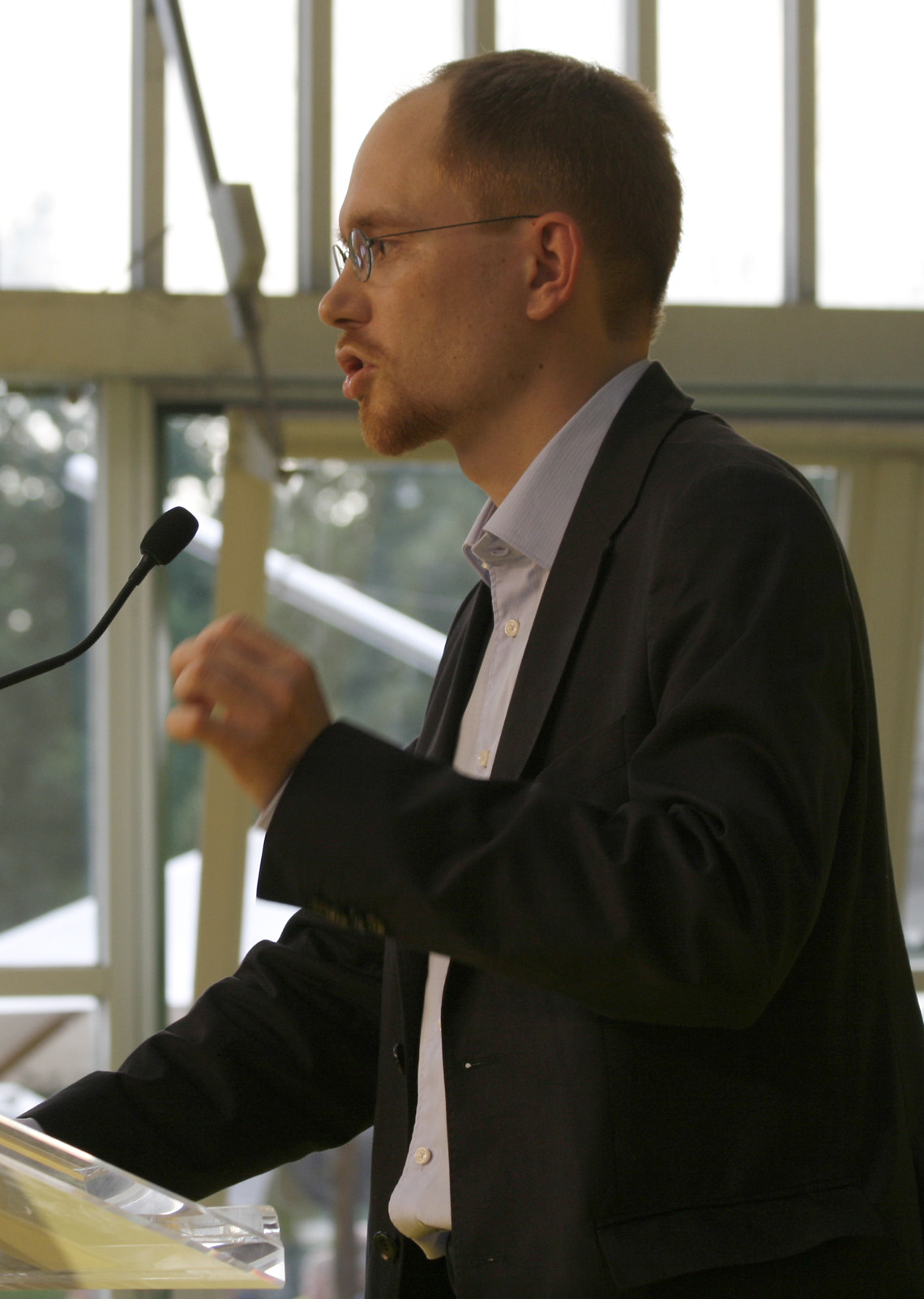
Alexander Zach in 2008

Alexander Zach (born 10 September 1976) is an Austrian politician and former member of the Austrian Parliament (2006–2008). He has been the head of the Liberal Forum from 2001 to 2008. Although his party did not run the elections of 2006, Zach was given a seat on the SPÖ as a result of an alliance whose aim was forestalling another term of Wolfgang Schüssel as chancellor. Only five days before the Austrian legislative elections in September 2008 Zach resigned his position as head of his party after being accused of lobbying for EADS.
