= Ewald Stadler =

Austrian politician (born 1961)

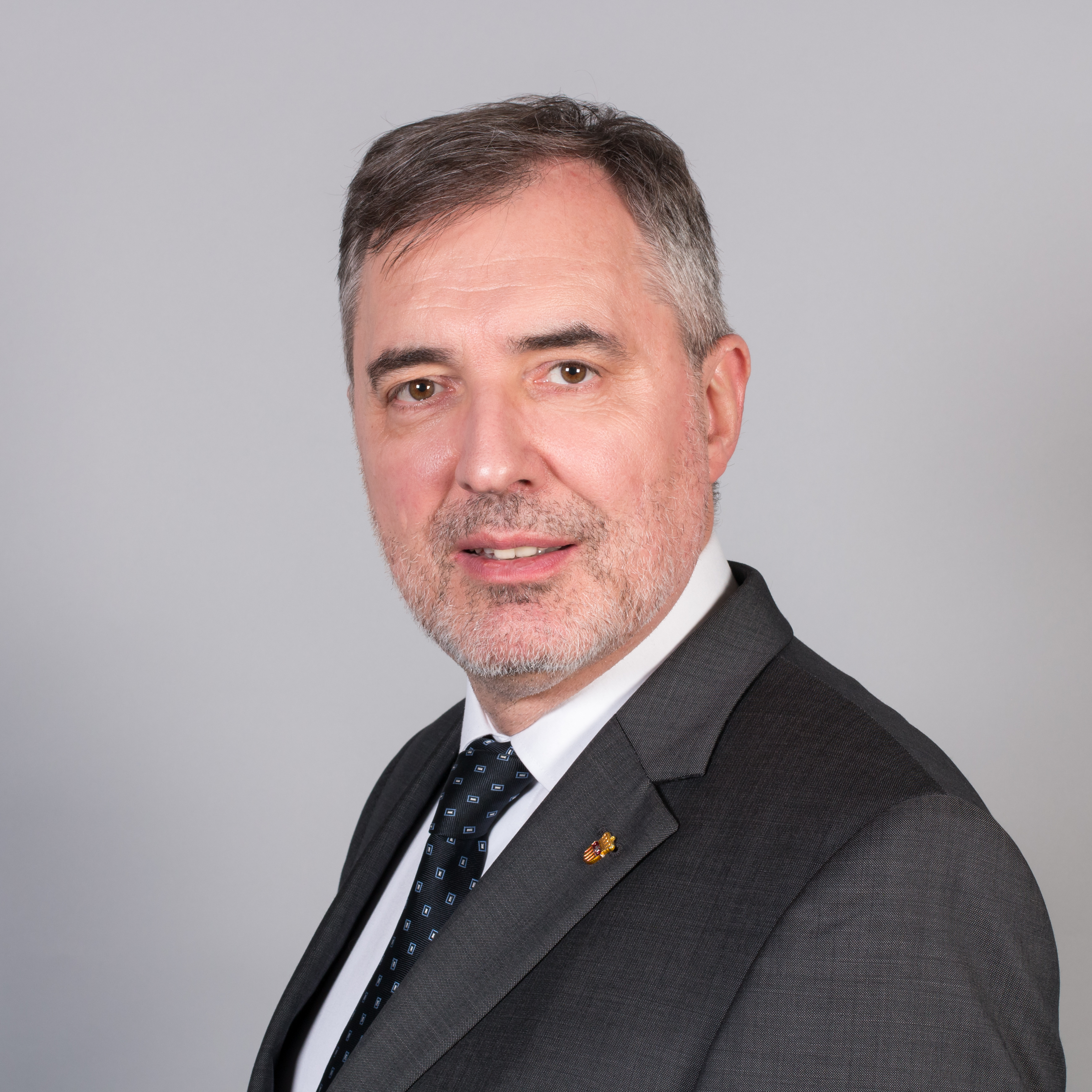
Ewald Stadler (2014)

Ewald Johann Stadler (born 21 May 1961), is an Austrian right-wing conservative politician. He was a member of the Freedom Party of Austria (FPÖ) until 2007, and a member of the Alliance for the Future of Austria (BZÖ) from 2007 until 2013. He ran for the European Parliament in 2009 as BZÖ's leading candidate and was a member of the European Parliament from 2011 to 2014. In 2014 he was chosen as the first party leader of The Reform Conservatives (REKOS).

== Early life and education ==
Stadler was born in Mäder, Austria. After his schooling, he worked at the Feldkirch city finance office. Later he studied law at the University of Innsbruck. As one of the requirements for becoming an attorney under the law of Austria, he completed his court practicum year at the regional court at Krems an der Donau.

== Political career ==
=== In Vorarlberg state ===
From 1985 to 1996 Ewald Stadler was a member of the municipal council (Gemeinderat) in Mäder and a member of its Gemeindevorstand (an elected subgroup of the Gemeinderat) from 1990 to 1994. As early as 1989 he was elected to the Landtag (provincial assembly) of Vorarlberg, in which he remained until 1994. In addition, from 1991 to 1994 Stadler was head of the Landtag caucus of the Vorarlberg Freedom Party (FPÖ). Also, while he was active in Vorarlberg provincial politics, he held the role of a member of the Vorarlberg FPÖ Provincial Party Committee. On 7 November 1994, Stadler moved up to the National Council of Austria (Nationalrat) as an FPÖ member, where he remained until 28 April 1999. Furthermore, he was a member of the FPÖ's Federal Party Committee (Bundesparteivorstand).

=== In Lower Austria and in Federal office ===
When he moved to Lower Austria, Stadler became deputy provincial party chief of the FPÖ for Lower Austria in 1998 and was a member of the Lower Austria provincial council between 1999 and 2001.

On 1 July 2001, he became a Volksanwalt (ombudsman) at the Federal level, responsible for commerce and advertising, defense, schools and culture, police, and the administration of justice. He stepped down as Volksanwalt on 30 October 2006 when he won a seat in the National Council. Starting in the summer of 2004, Stadler directed the Freedom Party Academy and was responsible for the training of FPÖ functionaries. However, the Academy became less important after a thorough reorganization in December 2006.

Stadler took up his seat for the FPÖ in the National Council on 30 October 2006. After internal differences with the FPÖ leadership, he resigned from the party on 7 March 2007, although he remained a member of the Freedom Party caucus. He announced on 16 August 2008, that he was joining the Alliance for the Future of Austria (BZÖ) for the National Council election of 2008. However, he wanted to remain a free deputy, elected from a district. Since 28 October 2008, Stadler has been a representative of the BZÖ in the National Council. Stadler was deputy chief of the Freedom Party caucus from 30 October 2006 to 6 March 2007, and was elected deputy chief of the BZÖ caucus on 28 October 2008.

On 3 April 2009, Stadler was elected as the new party chief of the Lower Austria BZÖ with 97.7 percent of the vote. He succeeded Christine Döttelmayer, who had stepped down from her position at the end of February 2009.

=== In the European Parliament ===
Stadler entered the European Parliament election in June 2009 as the leading candidate of the BZÖ. The 4.6 percent of votes received was not sufficient to win a seat at the time. However, when the Treaty of Lisbon took effect on 1 December 2009, Austria gained two seats in the European Parliament, making the BZÖ vote retrospectively sufficient to win Stadler a seat. After a delay of two years while other EU countries completed the process of choosing their own new MEPs and pending the ratification of certain treaty changes, Stadler was seated as an MEP on 11 December 2011. In October 2013 he was expelled from the BZÖ along with Stefan Petzner by designated leader Gerald Grosz for retrospectively publicly criticizing BZÖ's campaigning and poor election result in the Austrian legislative election of 2013. As of January 2014, Stadler retained his seat in the European Parliament as an unaffiliated member.

On 23 December 2013 (one day before Christmas Eve) Stadler, together with Rudolf Gehring of the Christian Party of Austria announced in a press conference they were founding a new party, The Reform Conservatives (REKOS) (German: Die Reformkonservativen) for which Stadler would run for the European Parliament election on 25 May 2014. Stadler was elected national party leader of REKOS on 8 March 2014. His term in the European Parliament ended on 30 June 2014.

== On the international stage ==
=== Speech against Turkey ===
In 2010, after the Turkish ambassador to Austria, Kadri Ecvet Tezcan, complained in an interview about the integration of Turkish immigrants in Austria, Stadler responded in the Austrian parliament with a speech about cases of intolerance in Turkey.

=== International observer in Ukraine crisis ===
In 2014, Ewald Stadler participated as a member of international observers groups who acknowledged the Eastern Ukrainian referendums in Crimea and in the Donetsk-Lugansk regions.

== Personal life ==
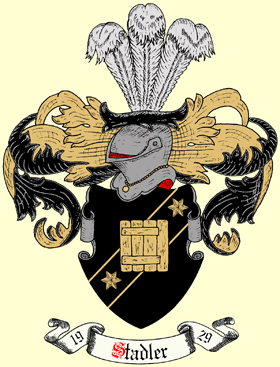
Coat of Arms of the Stadler Family

Stadler is a member of the Catholic lay association Compagnia di Santa Maria della Mercede, affiliated with the Mercedarian order. During his law studies at Innsbruck he was close to the Catholic traditionalist movement the Society of St. Pius X. He is married and has six children.
