= Neutral Free Austria Federation =

Neutral Free Austria Federation Bündnis Neutrales Freies Österreich
- Leader: Dipl.-Ing. Rudolf Pomaroli
- Founded: 17 March 2003
- Headquarters: 6010 Innsbruck, Postfach 110
- Ideology: Direct democracy Hard Euroscepticism; Christian conservatism Conservationism
- Political position: Right-wing

Website
- http://www.nfoe.at/

The Neutral Free Austria Federation (German: Bündnis Neutrales Freies Österreich, NFÖ) is a political party in Austria founded on 17 March 2003. It contested the 2006 legislative election under the name "EU Withdrawal – Neutral Free Austria" (EU-Austritt – Neutrales Freies Österreich), but only appeared on the ballot in Vorarlberg, Tyrol, Carinthia, Salzburg and Vienna and failed to pass the electoral threshold of 4%, achieving only 0.23%. Its party program is oriented on Christian politics and centered mainly on the demand to withdraw from the European Union and the establishment of direct democracy.
For the EU election 2014, together with the EU Exit Party (EU-Austrittspartei) which has very similar aims, the party formed an electoral platform called EU-STOP.

For the Viennese election 2015, it formed another electoral alliance with the EU Exit Party.

For the legislative election 2017, party leader Rudolf Pomaroli stood on the ballot of the FLÖ.

For the legislative election 2019, the party aimed to participate in an alliance with the Initiative Homeland and Environment as the Öxit Platform for Homeland and Environment, Neutrality and Direct Democracy which but failed to submit enough signatures for a participation. 52 of their collected signatures became stolen.

== European Parliament ==
Election	Votes	%	Seats	+/–
2014	77,897	2.76(#6)	0 / 18	▲
