= Alliance for the Future of Austria =

Political party

Alliance for the Future of Austria Bündnis Zukunft Österreich
- Leader: Helmut Nikel (in Carinthia)
- Founder: Jörg Haider
- Founded: 3 April 2005
- Split from: Freedom Party of Austria
- Headquarters: Volksgartenstraße 3/5; A-1010 Vienna
- Youth wing: Generation of the Future of Austria
- Membership: 8,000 (2011)
- Ideology: National conservatism; National liberalism; Right-wing populism; Euroscepticism
- Political position: Right-wing to far-right
- Colours: Orange
- National Council: 0 / 183
- Federal Council: 0 / 61
- European Parliament: 0 / 18
- State Parliaments: 0 / 440

Website
- www.bzoe-kaernten.at

The Alliance for the Future of Austria (German: Bündnis Zukunft Österreich; BZÖ) is a right-wing populist, national conservative political party in Austria.

The BZÖ was founded on 3 April 2005 by Jörg Haider as a moderate splinter from the Freedom Party of Austria (FPÖ) and immediately took the FPÖ's place in coalition with the Austrian People's Party (ÖVP). The party won seven seats at the 2006 election, ending its involvement in government. The September 2008 election saw the BZÖ breakthrough with 21 seats, while the FPÖ's vote also increased. Thirteen days after the election, Haider died in a car crash; in April 2009, Josef Bucher became leader. Under Bucher's leadership, the party moved towards economic liberalism, leading to the secession of the party's Carinthia branch to form the Freedom Party in Carinthia in December 2009.

Under Bucher, who chaired BZÖ until 2013, the party became economically liberal and socially conservative. The party aims to take ground from the ÖVP by defending the middle class and free markets: supporting a flat tax (currently a model with 44% which exists as calculator tool on the party's website), privatisation of utilities, and large reductions in both bureaucracy and the government debt. The party takes a more moderate position than the FPÖ on immigration – proposing the introduction of a 'green card' – and is in some ways 'eurosceptic'. Unlike the FPÖ, the BZÖ is notable for the reintroduction of tuition fees, abandoning conscription and the adoption of a system of Common Security and Defence Policy in the European Union.

Since 2013, BZÖ has not been represented in the national parliament and in 2017 it lost its last seats in the Carinthia state parliament. In the 2019 Austrian legislative election, the party only contested in the state of Carinthia, receiving 760 votes (0.02% of the national electorate); in the 2024 election it did not run at all.

== History ==
=== Foundation ===
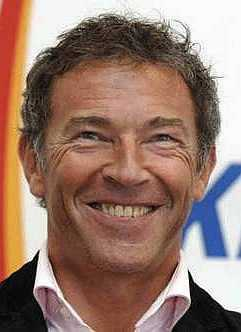
Jörg Haider founded the BZÖ in 2005, after failing to reform the FPÖ into a more moderate party.

The BZÖ was founded as the result of considerable disagreements within the Freedom Party between Jörg Haider, the Freedom Party's chair person Ursula Haubner and Vice Chancellor Hubert Gorbach on the one side and the circle around Heinz-Christian Strache, Andreas Mölzer, and Ewald Stadler on the other. The former group broke off and founded the new party in order to distance themselves from the right.

The party's charter was deposited at the Federal Ministry of the Interior on 3 April 2005, as is required by Austrian law, and the founding of the party was announced by former members of the Freedom Party the following day. On 6 April 2005, the party's charter was published in the official gazette of the Wiener Zeitung, and the initial conference took place on 17 April in Salzburg where the party's programme was agreed upon.

The BZÖ became the first party of the Second Republic to immediately join a government without taking part in an election. In the coalition with the Austrian People's Party (ÖVP), the BZÖ held the vice-chancellorship and two ministries.

The first test for the BZÖ came in a series of Landtag elections in October 2005. In the elections to the Styrian state parliament on 2 October 2005, the BZÖ only obtained a 1.7% share of votes and clearly failed to enter the Landtag, while the FPÖ, with 4.6%, failed by a much smaller margin. The BZÖ's leading candidate was Michael Schmid, a former Austrian minister of infrastructure.

The BZÖ did not stand in the October 2005 elections in Burgenland. In the 23 October elections in Vienna, it was led by former Lower Austrian state government member Hans Jörg Schimanek. However, it received only 1.2% of votes, while the FPÖ, led by national party chairman Heinz-Christian Strache, surprised pollsters with a share of 14.9%.

=== Consolidation ===
Since the BZÖ performed poorly in the state elections it participated in shortly after its formation, many commentators believed that it would disappear after the 2006 general election. However, the party obtained 4.1% of the vote and seven seats in the National Council in 2006. The party was led by Peter Westenthaler from June 2006 until August 2008.

Haider formally re-assumed the party chairmanship on 30 August 2008, and was the party's candidate for Chancellor of Austria in snap general elections that took place on 28 September 2008. In those elections, the BZÖ scored a major victory taking 522,933 votes nationally translating into 10.70% of the total national vote. The party increased its representation from seven to 21 seats in the National Council. However, 13 days after the election, Haider died in a car crash.

=== After Haider ===
After Haider's death, the party was led by a temporary leadership team consisting of Stefan Petzner (Haider's former spokesman) and later on Herbert Scheibner (former Defence minister).

In March 2009 elections were held in Salzburg (the party achieved 3.7% there, failed to enter Landtag but entered some Carinthian state and municipal elections where the party reached 44.9% and kept the Landeshauptmann.

On 26 April 2009, a party congress in Linz elected Josef Bucher as the new leader.

In their first European Parliament election, in June 2009, the BZÖ received 4.58% of the votes. This was sufficient for Ewald Stadler to take his place as an Observer MEP and later on, in 2011, as an MEP.

In autumn 2009, the party reached only 1.2% in the elections in Vorarlberg and 2.83% at the Upper Austrian state elections held on 27 September and failed to enter the Landtag.

=== Liberal turn ===
Following Bucher's efforts to change the ideological direction of the BZÖ, many of the Carinthian party members broke away and on 16 December 2009 reorganised as the Freedom Party in Carinthia (distinct from the federal FPÖ). The Carinthian BZÖ was re-established on 30 January 2010.

On 2 May 2010, the Alliance for the Future of Austria held a convention in Vienna, where their first Bündnisprogramm was designed and agreed upon by open ballot in unanimity.

At the May 2010 election in Styria, the BZÖ achieved 2.98% with Gerald Grosz as leading candidate for the Landtag. At the October 2010 Vienna state elections, the Alliance for the Future of Austria had nominated Walter Sonnleitner as leading candidate to check the new right-wing liberal course in action and reached 1,33% of the Viennese voters. After that, Grosz claimed that the 2.98% achieved in Styria were a triumph in comparison to the 1.33% in Vienna and that he was concerned about the next general election.

Bucher and Grosz later confirmed that they had agreed to einen "bürgerlichen Kurs rechts der Mitte" (a "middle class course right of the centre") and that both fully supported this course.

To show its freshness the Alliance changed its branding which became an orange rectangle with the name written in white inside at a meeting on 30 January 2011 in Carinthia to celebrate the first anniversary the refounding of the host party, BZÖ Kärnten (the Carinthian BZÖ).

In September 2011, the party launched a campaign against EU fiscal union, quoting the Bible – "They know not what they do" (Luke 23:34) – to criticise the SPÖ, ÖVP and EU 'bosses'. The party abolished the position of secretary-general on 13 September. One day later, this caused Member of Parliament Robert Lugar to leave the Alliance's caucus.

Furthermore, the so-called "Bucher-Plan" was introduced which contains an immediate payment stop for bankrupt EU countries an exclusion of Greece from the EU and a whole new safe and independent Monetary Zone of strong countries consisting of Austria, Germany, Luxembourg and the Netherlands.

After the general elections of 29 September 2013 with Josef Bucher as the party's candidate for Chancellor of Austria the support for the BZÖ dropped to 164,599 votes. As a consequence, on 2 October 2013 Josef Bucher stepped down as party leader. In turn, Gerald Grosz was appointed new head of the party.

Following the new leadership, two former party members Stefan Petzner and Ewald Stadler were expelled from the BZÖ by Gerald Grosz.

On 15 March 2014, during an extraordinary party convent, DDr. Ulrike Haider-Quercia was presented as leading candidate for the upcoming European elections and she was accepted unanimously. On 27 March, it was announced that MEP Werthmann would be the independent candidate for DDr. Haider-Quercia's list for the BZÖ for the European elections. Consequently, Werthmann was excluded from the ALDE group, since the ALDE group leader Guy Verhofstadt did not want the BZÖ to be in the European Parliament as part of the ALDE group. In turn, DDr. Haider-Quercia stepped back from her candidacy and in consequence MEP Werthmann became top candidate for the independent "List Mag. Werthmann" However, the BZÖ was not re-elected into parliament during European elections held on 25 May 2014.

On 20 July 2017, the last two BZÖ members of the Landtag of Carinthia left the party.

== Policies ==
=== Ideology ===
On 15 October 2009, the party described its political position as centre-right, expressing their more moderate stance compared with the Freedom Party of Austria (FPÖ). Under Joseph Bucher, the party has been economically liberal and socially conservative.

The BZÖ describes itself as "ideologiefrei, aber zukunftsorientiert und wertebewusst" (free from ideology, but forward-looking and conscious of traditional values). From its beginning, the party's leader and programme changed very often, until Josef Bucher became the party leader. This brought the first installation of the "Bündnisprogramm" in Vienna which was accepted in open ballot vote by 600 attending members, and a political orientation described now as "rechtsliberal" (right-wing liberal).

The BZÖ wants to especially focus on the Mittelstand, civil and political rights, the stop of compulsory membership in the state and personal freedom. The BZÖ is especially outspoken against new taxes and calls for more reforms.

The BZÖ also opposes, among others, the Anti-Counterfeiting Trade Agreement as well as the TTIP.

=== Economics ===
The BZÖ supports reducing the reduction of government debt, which stood at 80% of gross domestic product in 2011. The party supports the privatisation of utilities and parts of the Austrian Federal Railways. The party advocates 'radical clearing' of bureaucracy and Bucher had proposed a 44% flat tax (including social security contribution) on earnings above €14,235.28 with a further allowance of €9,000 for each child.

=== Social issues ===
The party supports the introduction of the Green card model as it is in practice in the United States. This policy was introduced by Bucher in 2009 in recognition of Austria's reliance on immigration and separates the BZÖ from the FPÖ.

Gerald Grosz made history for the Austrian nationalist movement when he became the first openly gay president of an Austrian nationalist party. He is also a member of Rechtskomitee LAMBDA (RKL), Austria's main LGBT rights organization.

=== Foreign policy ===
Unlike the ÖVP and FPÖ the BZÖ supports in 2010 the abolition of conscription and the creation of a Volunteer military consisting of so-called "Berufssoldaten" and a strong Militia component, according to vice-chairman Herbert Scheibner, former Defence minister. The BZÖ demands an increase of the Common Foreign and Security Policy and admitted to the adaption of a system of Common Security and Defence Policy in the European Union.

The BZÖ demanded a referendum on the Lisbon Treaty and, like the FPÖ, it advocates the introduction of a hard north Euro and a soft south Euro. It opposes Turkish accession to the EU.

In the 2019 Austrian legislative election the BZÖ-Alliance of Patriots calls for Austria's withdrawal from the European Union.

=== Constitution ===
There are also major differences of opinion between FPÖ and BZÖ about the future of the Federal Council, the upper house of the Austrian Parliament. While the FPÖ would like to enhance it to a real "Länderkammer", the BZÖ calls for political reforms to abolish the council and to replace its competences with the Landeshauptleutekonferenz. The idea behind this is "to end the blocking politics by the provinces" and furthermore he states' "governors and a small number of councillors should represent their home regions interests after such a reform". Party leader Josef Bucher also suggested to abolish the Federal President and instead make the Federal Chancellor a directly elected "Chancellor President".

== Political support ==
The party has polled around 5–6% since early 2011, having won 10% at the 2008 election. The party is particularly strong in Carinthia, where the party won 45% at the 2009 election and still polls over 10%, even after the secession of the Freedom Party in Carinthia.

The party has stated that it aims to stand up for the middle class as the "stronghold of the taxpayer".

=== State branches ===
Each state has a BZÖ branch that exists and acts semi-independently of the federal party. The state branches of the Freedom Party reacted in different ways to the creation of the BZÖ. The Freedom Party in Carinthia, which enjoyed a great deal of autonomy under that party's statutes, was the only state branch which became a part of the BZÖ en masse.

The Freedom Party in Upper Austria originally planned to decouple itself from the federal party and go its own way without joining the BZÖ for the time being. In April 2006, the convention of the Freedom Party of Upper Austria decided to rejoin the federal FPÖ. Former party expulsions have been revoked.

The state parties split in Vienna, the Tyrol, and Styria. The leaders in these three states decided to remain a part of the FPÖ, although some members of these state groups showed sympathy towards the BZÖ.

=== Sections ===
The BZÖ has a youth wing, called the Generation of the Future of Austria (Generation Zukunft Österreich), a pensioners' wing, called the Independent Seniors Platform (Unabhängige Seniorenplattform), a families wing, called the Family for the Future of Austria (Familie Zukunft Österreich), a farmers wing called "BZÖ Bauern" a labours wing called "BZÖ Arbeitnehmer" (at the moment in Carinthia only with Sigisbert Dolinschek as chairman) as well as a business wing called "BZÖ Unternehmer".

=== Finances ===
The party has been debt-free since 2012. The BZÖ currently receives party funding of €4.1 million per annum.

=== Membership ===
At the initial party conference on 17 April 2005, Jörg Haider was elected leader of the Alliance. Hubert Gorbach, the Austrian Vice-Chancellor and Minister for Infrastructure was the parliamentary leader, with Heike Trammer and Karin Gastinger as his deputies. Uwe Scheuch, a member of the National Council and former General Secretary of the Freedom Party, is the Alliance's spokesman. On 24 September 2006 Karin Gastinger left the BZÖ, staying Minister of Justice.

Other prominent members are:

- Ursula Haubner (Jörg Haider's sister): Social Security Minister and former Freedom Party leader
- Herbert Scheibner: former Defence Minister, former leader of the Freedom Party group in the National Council

Jörg Haider remained leader or "Bündnisobmann" of the BZÖ until his death in October 2008.

== Election results ==
=== General elections ===
National Council of Austria
Election	Votes	% of vote	Seats
2006	193,539	4.1%	7 / 183
2008	522,933	10.7%	21 / 183
2013	165,746	3.53%	0 / 183
2019	760	0.02%	0 / 183

=== European Parliament elections ===
European Parliament
Election	Votes	% of vote	Seats
2009	131,261	4.6%	1 / 17 (Note: BZÖ's sole member of European Parliament Ewald Stadler has since been removed from the party in October 2013)
2014	13,208	0.47%	0 / 18

== Leadership ==
=== Party chairmen ===
- Jörg Haider (2005–2006)
- Peter Westenthaler (2006–2008)
- Jörg Haider (August 2008 – 11 October 2008)
- Stefan Petzner (acting only; 12 October 2008 – 19 November 2008)
- Herbert Scheibner (acting only; 19 November 2008 – 26 April 2009)
- Josef Bucher (26 April 2009 – 2 October 2013)
- Gerald Grosz (19 October 2013 – 30 March 2015)
- Johanna Trodt-Limpl (30 March 2015 – 3 June 2017)
- Helmut Nikel (since 3 June 2017 in Carinthia)

=== List of chairmen in the States of Austria ===
==== Burgenland ====
- Karl Schweitzer (2006–2008)
- Jörg Steiner (3 July 2008 – July 2012)
- Dieter Herist (July 2012 – 2013)

==== Carinthia ====
- Jörg Haider (25 November 2005 – 11 October 2008)
- Uwe Scheuch (15 November 2008 – 16 December 2009)
- Josef Bucher (30 January 2010 – 2 October 2013)
- Johanna Trodt-Limpl (30 November 2013 – 3 July 2017)
- Helmut Nikel (since 3 July 2017)

==== Lower Austria ====
- Anton Wattaul (29 January 2006 – 18 July 2006)
- Peter Staudigl (24 November 2007 – 11 March 2008)
- Christine Döttelmayer (acting only; – 25 February 2009)
- Ewald Stadler (3 April 2009 – 3 October 2013)
- Dominik Lutz (since 7 December 2013)

==== Salzburg ====
- Eduard Mainoni (18 March 2006 – 30 June 2007)
- Robert Stark (since 22 November 2008)
- Mattias Angerer (since May 2014)

==== Styria ====
- Gerald Grosz (5 June 2005 – 4 December 2012)
- Martina Schenk (acting only; – 15 March 2013)

==== Tyrol ====
- Hans Jörg Stock (31 March 2006 – April 2008)
- Marina Steixner (acting only)
- Gerhard Huber (19 April 2009 - January 2014)
- Hans Jörg Stock (January 2014 – December 2020)

==== Upper Austria ====
- Ursula Haubner (26 November 2005 – January 2017)
- Siegfried Berlinger (since January 2017)

==== Vienna ====
- Günther Barnet (2005 – 8 May 2007)
- Michael Tscharnutter (since 2 June 2007)
- Dietmar Schwingenschrot (23 July 2015 – 18 July 2019, then dissolution of the party in Vienna)

==== Vorarlberg ====
- Arno Eccher (March 2006 – December 2007)
- Christoph Hagen (8 May 2009 – October 2012)
- Manfred Dorn (since 13 October 2012)

== See also ==
- Freedom Party of Austria
