= 2006 Austrian legislative election =

- 1 October 2006

All 183 seats in the National Council 92 seats needed for a majority
- Turnout: 78.5% (▼5.8 pp)
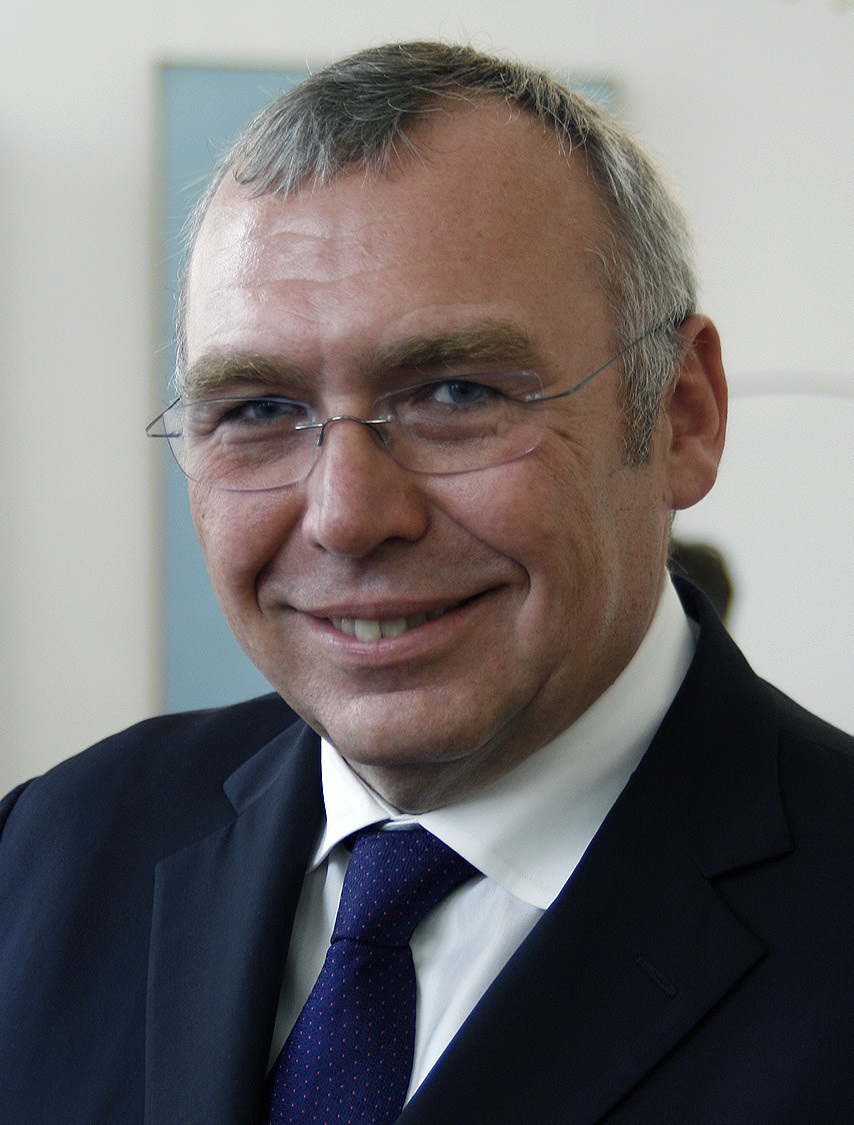

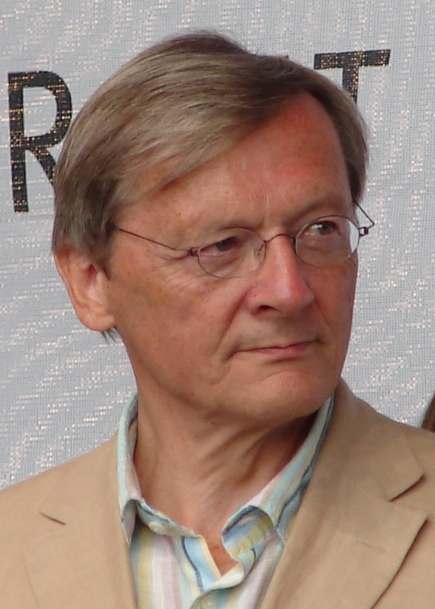

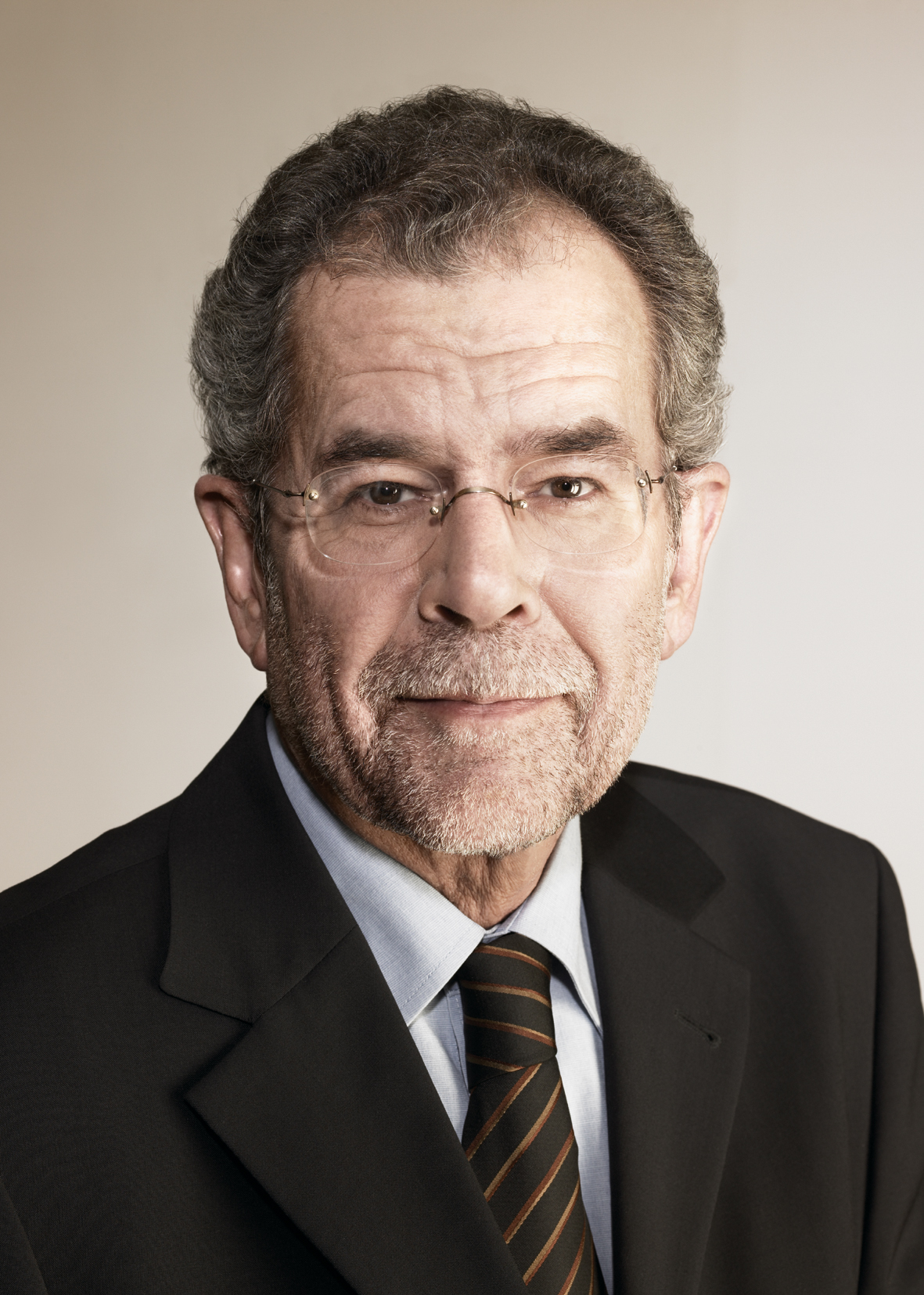

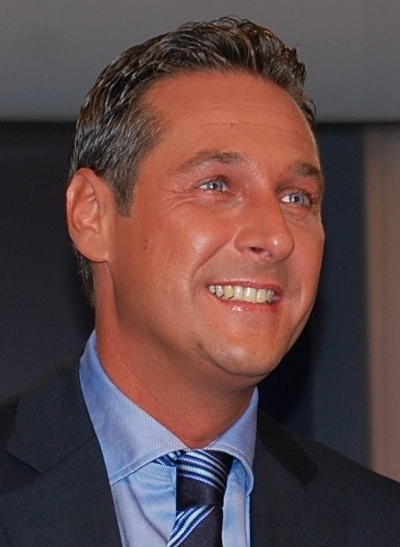

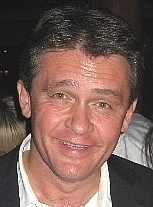
	First party	Second party	Third party
Leader	Alfred Gusenbauer	Wolfgang Schüssel	Alexander Van der Bellen
Party	SPÖ	ÖVP	Greens
Last election	36.5%, 69 seats	42.3%, 79 seats	9.5%, 17 seats
Seats won	68	66	21
Seat change	▼1	▼13	▲4
Popular vote	1,663,986	1,616,493	520,130
Percentage	35.3%	34.3%	11.1%
Swing	▼1.2 pp	▼8.0 pp	▲1.6 pp
	Fourth party	Fifth party
Leader	Heinz-Christian Strache	Peter Westenthaler
Party	FPÖ	BZÖ
Last election	10.0%, 18 seats	–
Seats won	21	7
Seat change	▲3	New
Popular vote	519,598	193,539
Percentage	11.0%	4.1%
Swing	▲1.0 pp	New
Chancellor before election
Wolfgang Schüssel
ÖVP
Elected Chancellor
Alfred Gusenbauer
SPÖ

Legislative elections were held in Austria on 1 October 2006 to elect the 23rd National Council, the lower house of Austria's bicameral parliament.

The governing Austrian People's Party (ÖVP) suffered substantial losses and was unexpectedly overtaken by the Social Democratic Party of Austria (SPÖ). The Greens became the third largest party for the first time, while the Freedom Party of Austria (FPÖ) fell to fourth for the first time since its establishment in 1956. The Alliance for the Future of Austria (BZÖ), competing in its first national election, narrowly passed the 4% electoral threshold, despite opinion polling which indicated it would fall short.

After the 2002 election, the ÖVP formed government with the FPÖ; in 2005, the Alliance for the Future of Austria (BZÖ) split from the FPÖ. Most of the FPÖ's National Council deputies joined the new party, which replaced the FPÖ as the junior partner in government. As a result of the 2006 election, the ÖVP–BZÖ coalition lost its majority. After three months of negotiations, the SPÖ and ÖVP formed a grand coalition under SPÖ leader Alfred Gusenbauer, which took office on 11 January 2007.

== Contesting parties ==
The table below lists parties represented in the 22nd National Council.

Name		Ideology	Leader	2002 result	
Name		Ideology	Leader	Votes (%)	Seats
ÖVP	Austrian People's Party; Österreichische Volkspartei	Christian democracy	Wolfgang Schüssel	42.3%	79 / 183
SPÖ	Social Democratic Party of Austria; Sozialdemokratische Partei Österreichs	Social democracy	Alfred Gusenbauer	36.5%	69 / 183
FPÖ	Freedom Party of Austria; Freiheitliche Partei Österreichs	Right-wing populism Euroscepticism	Heinz-Christian Strache	10.0%	18 / 183
GRÜNE	The Greens; Die Grünen	Green politics	Alexander Van der Bellen	9.5%	17 / 183

=== Qualified parties ===
In addition to the parties already represented in the National Council, eight parties collected enough signatures to be placed on the ballot. Three of these were cleared to be on the ballot in all states, five of them only in some.

==== On the ballot in all 9 states ====
- Alliance for the Future of Austria (BZÖ)
- Communist Party of Austria (KPÖ)
- Hans-Peter Martin's List (MATIN)

==== On the ballot in some states only ====
- EU Withdrawal – Neutral Free Austria (NFÖ) - on the ballot only in Carinthia, Salzburg, Tyrol, Vorarlberg, and Vienna
- Socialist Left Party, List against Capitalism and Racism (SLP) - on the ballot only in Vienna
- Certainly – Absolutely – Independent, Franz Radinger – on the ballot only in Carinthia
- Initiative 2000 – on the ballot only in Burgenland
- List Strong – on the ballot only in Carinthia

== Campaign ==
=== Austrian People's Party ===
The Austrian People's Party contested the election with Chancellor Wolfgang Schüssel as its leader. It was the first federal election in Austria since 1970 the party entered as strongest party. Slogans used by the party in the campaign were "Secure. Austria" (Sicher. Österreich), "Austria. Here, we are well." (Österreich. Hier geht's uns gut.) and "Austria. Stays better." (Österreich. Bleibt besser.) They also attacked the Social Democratic Party, attesting them a lack of economic competence, repeatedly bringing up the so-called "BAWAG-Affair". The ÖVP cited a rising number of academics and shorter study periods, according to them because of the introduction of tuition fees, as some of their successes. They also capitalized on their women's policies, including being the first Austrian cabinet with half the ministers being women and appointing a woman as president of the Supreme Court for the first time.

=== Social Democratic Party of Austria ===
The Social Democratic Party was led by Alfred Gusenbauer in the election campaign. Themes of their campaign included a rising in youth unemployment, criticism of the Schüssel government's pension reform as well as the order of Eurofighter Typhoon fighters which they wanted to cancel in the case of them entering government. They also criticized the abolishment of the Ministry for Women and promised to abolish tuition fees for universities.

After coming in first in opinion polls for a long time, from March 2006 onwards the Austrian People's Party was ahead of them. The main reason for this was believed to be the "BAWAG-Affair": the Bank for Work and Economy (Bank für Arbeit und Wirtschaft), in which the Social Democratic-dominated Austrian Trade Union Federation held a majority, was hurled into turbulences, leading to disputes in the party.

On 3 September 2006 the Social Democratic Party and the Liberal Forum formed an electoral alliance with the goal to prevent a further ÖVP-led government.

=== Freedom Party of Austria ===
The Freedom Party of Austria campaigned with party leader Heinz-Christian Strache as their leading candidate.

Media considered the initiative "Stay free Austria" (Volksbegehren "Österreich bleib frei") as start of their campaign. Some points of their party programme they highlighted were: No accession of Turkey to the European Union and rejection of the European Constitution, no rising of Austria's contributions to the European Union, aggravation of citizenship laws, stopping immigration and fighting abuse of asylum.

=== The Greens ===
Leading candidate for the Green Party was party leader Alexander Van der Bellen.

The Greens started their pre-election campaign in May 2006 with the presentation of two "Black Books". The "Black Book black" concentrated on their criticism of the People's Party government, the "Black Book red" criticized the opposition performance of the Social Democratic Party. The Greens accused both parties of violations of human rights, with their main criticism being the 2005 reform of the asylum and foreigner's rights laws, to which the Social Democratic Party had agreed. Central to their campaign were promotion of alternative energy, improving the situation of working women, introduction of a demand orientated basic social security (Grundsicherung), an education reform and introduction of a point-system for immigration, favouring highly qualified immigrants.

They stated abolishment of tuition fees for universities and cancelling the order for Eurofighter as conditions for entering a government.

=== Alliance for the Future of Austria ===
The BZÖ entered the campaign with Peter Westenthaler, former floor leader of the Freedom Party, as its leading candidate.

Peter Westenthaler was elected as party leader on a special party summit on 23 June 2006. The party contested the election as "The Freedom-minded – Westenthaler's List – BZÖ" (Die Freiheitlichen – Liste Westenthaler – BZÖ). After the Freedom Party obtained a preliminary injunction, the BZÖ had to remove the phrase "The Freedom-minded" from its billboards – it remained on ballot papers nonetheless.

The party presented an election programme with the title "10 points against a shift to the left in Austria". Policies included: lowering of number of foreigners by 30%, limits for the share of non-native German speakers in classes and termination of the European Union's accession talks with Turkey.

On 25 September, six days before the election, Minister of Justice Karin Gastinger, deputy leader of the BZÖ and the party's leading candidate in Styria announced her leaving the party. As reason for her decision she stated that she "doesn't want to be active in a political movement that is xenophobic, that operates with fear".

=== Minor parties ===
==== Communist Party of Austria ====
Leading candidate for the Communist Party of Austria was Mirko Messner. Hoping for a basic mandate in the constituency Graz, the Communist Party made heavy use of the Styrian politician Ernest Kaltenegger, who managed to secure one of the best election results in the history of the party when gaining 20% of the votes in the municipal elections in Graz. Points of their election campaign included a tax for the rich as well as higher minimal pensions and wages.

==== Dr. Martin's List ====
Hans-Peter Martin, MEP, announced in July 2006 that he intended to run with his own party. He concentrated on criticizing the established parties and trying to attract protest votes. Due to a limit on party’s short names on ballot papers to five letters the party ran as MATIN.

== Opinion polling ==
Polling firm	Fieldwork date	ÖVP	SPÖ	FPÖ	Grüne	BZÖ	MATIN	Lead
2006 legislative election	1 Oct 2006	34.3	35.3	11.0	11.1	4.1	2.8	1.0
NEWS-Market	27 Sep 2006	38	35	10	11	3	3	3
Profil-OGM	23 Sep 2006	37	35	10	11	3	3	2
ÖSTERREICH-Gallup	22 Sep 2006	38	35	10	10	3	4	3
NEWS-Market	20 Sep 2006	39	34	9	11	3	3	5
ÖSTERREICH-Gallup	19 Sep 2006	38	35	10	11	3	3	3
Profil-OGM	16 Sep 2006	38	35	10	10	3	3	3
ÖSTERREICH-Gallup	12 Sep 2006	39	35	8	10	3	4	4
IGF	11 Sep 2006	39	34	8	11	3	4	5
ÖSTERREICH-Gallup	9 Sep 2006	38	35	7	12	3	4	3
Profil-OGM	9 Sep 2006	38	35	9	10	2	5	3
NEWS/Market	7 Sep 2006	38	34	8	11	3	5	4
Kurier/Integral	3 Sep 2006	37	35	8	11	4	5	2
ÖSTERREICH-Gallup	31 Aug 2006	37	35	7	11	4	4	2
NEWS-Market	30 Aug 2006	39	35	7	11	3	4	4
Profil-OGM	26 Aug 2006	39	35	7	11	3	4	4
NEWS/Market	23 Aug 2006	38	36	7	10	4	4	2
NEWS/Market	16 Aug 2006	40	34	7	11	3	4	6
NEWS/Market	2 Aug 2006	39	35	6	11	3	5	4
Kurier/Integral	16 Jul 2006	39	35	8	12	4	–	4
Profil/OGM	15 Jul 2006	40	36	8	12	3	–	4
NEWS/Market	12 Jul 2006	41	36	5	11	3	3	5
2002 legislative election	24 Nov 2002	42.3	36.5	10.0	9.5	–	–	5.8

== Results ==
Party	Votes	%	Seats	+/–
Social Democratic Party of Austria	1,663,986	35.34	68	−1
Austrian People's Party	1,616,493	34.33	66	−13
The Greens	520,130	11.05	21	+4
Freedom Party of Austria	519,598	11.04	21	+3
Alliance for the Future of Austria	193,539	4.11	7	New
Hans-Peter Martin's List	131,688	2.80	0	New
Communist Party of Austria	47,578	1.01	0	0
EU Withdrawal – Neutral Free Austria	10,594	0.23	0	New
Socialist Left Party	2,257	0.05	0	0
Certainly – Absolutely – Independent, Franz Radinger	1,514	0.03	0	New
Initiative 2000	592	0.01	0	New
List Strong	312	0.01	0	New
Total	4,708,281	100.00	183	0
Valid votes	4,708,281	98.22		
Invalid/blank votes	85,499	1.78		
Total votes	4,793,780	100.00		
Registered voters/turnout	6,107,892	78.49		
Source: BMI

=== Results by state ===
State	SPÖ	ÖVP	Grüne	FPÖ	BZÖ	MATIN	Others	Turnout
Burgenland	45.0	36.1	5.8	8.6	1.7	2.0	0.8	86.9
Carinthia	35.4	21.2	7.5	7.3	24.9	1.9	1.8	77.3
Lower Austria	36.2	39.2	9.0	9.6	2.3	3.0	0.7	85.2
Upper Austria	36.1	35.2	10.2	12.2	2.6	2.8	0.9	81.4
Salzburg	28.5	39.2	12.5	12.2	3.1	3.2	1.3	76.9
Styria	37.2	37.5	7.9	10.4	3.2	1.9	1.9	78.6
Tyrol	23.2	43.8	13.0	10.8	3.3	4.1	1.8	72.8
Vorarlberg	18.5	42.0	16.5	10.9	3.2	7.7	1.2	70.0
Vienna	41.0	21.8	17.4	13.9	1.8	2.2	1.9	72.4
Austria	35.3	34.3	11.1	11.0	4.1	2.8	1.3	78.5
Source: Austrian Interior Ministry

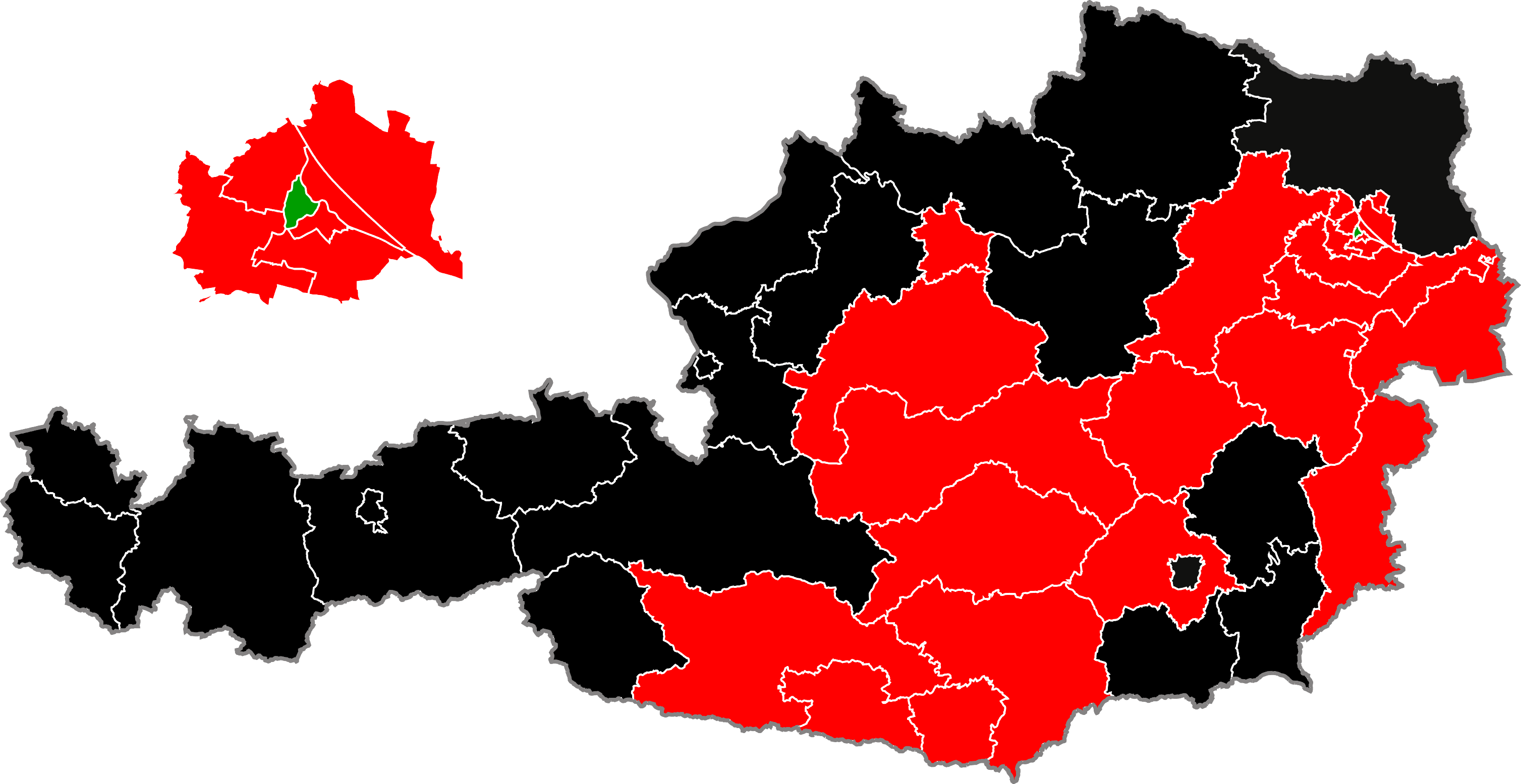
Strongest party by constituency

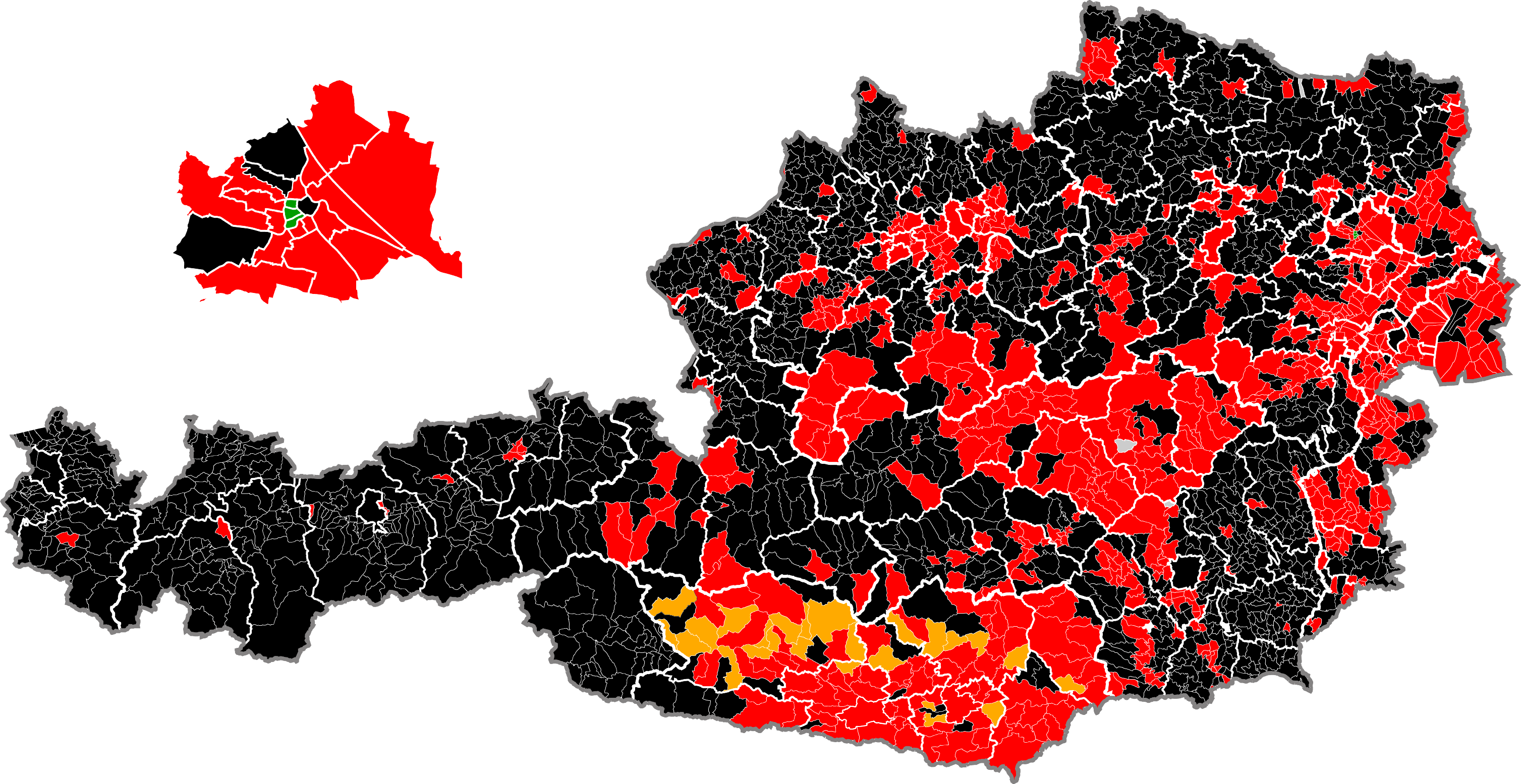
Strongest party by municipality

=== Summary ===
- The ÖVP lost many of the votes they had taken from the FPÖ in the 2002 election.
- The Social Democratic Party of Austria (SPÖ) lost fewer votes and thus regained a plurality.
- The Austrian Green Party received more than 11% of the votes and pulled ahead of the Freedom Party.
- The FPÖ increased their share of votes slightly but missed third place by about 500 votes.
- The BZÖ, which had split off from the FPÖ in 2005, crossed the threshold of 4% and will be represented in the new parliament.
- The Austrian Communist Party (KPÖ) increased its share of votes to 1%.
- The list of Hans Peter Martin received 2.8%. Both his list and the KPÖ are below the 4% threshold that is necessary for parliamentary representation.
- The Liberal Forum decided not to stand in the election, citing the tight schedule as well as the lack of finances and a suitable party leader. However, on 3 September 2006 the SPÖ announced an electoral alliance with the LIF (some of the LIF's candidates will stand on the SPÖ's party list, ensuring that at least the LIF's chairman Alexander Zach will be a member of the next parliament).
