= Gerhard Huber =

Austrian gymnast (born 1934)

- Born: 20 January 1934 (age 92) Salzburg, Austria

Gymnastics career
- Discipline: Men's artistic gymnastics
- Country represented: Austria

Gerhard Huber (born 20 January 1934) is an Austrian gymnast. He competed in eight events at the 1960 Summer Olympics.
