= Jacek Włosowicz =

Polish politician (born 1966)

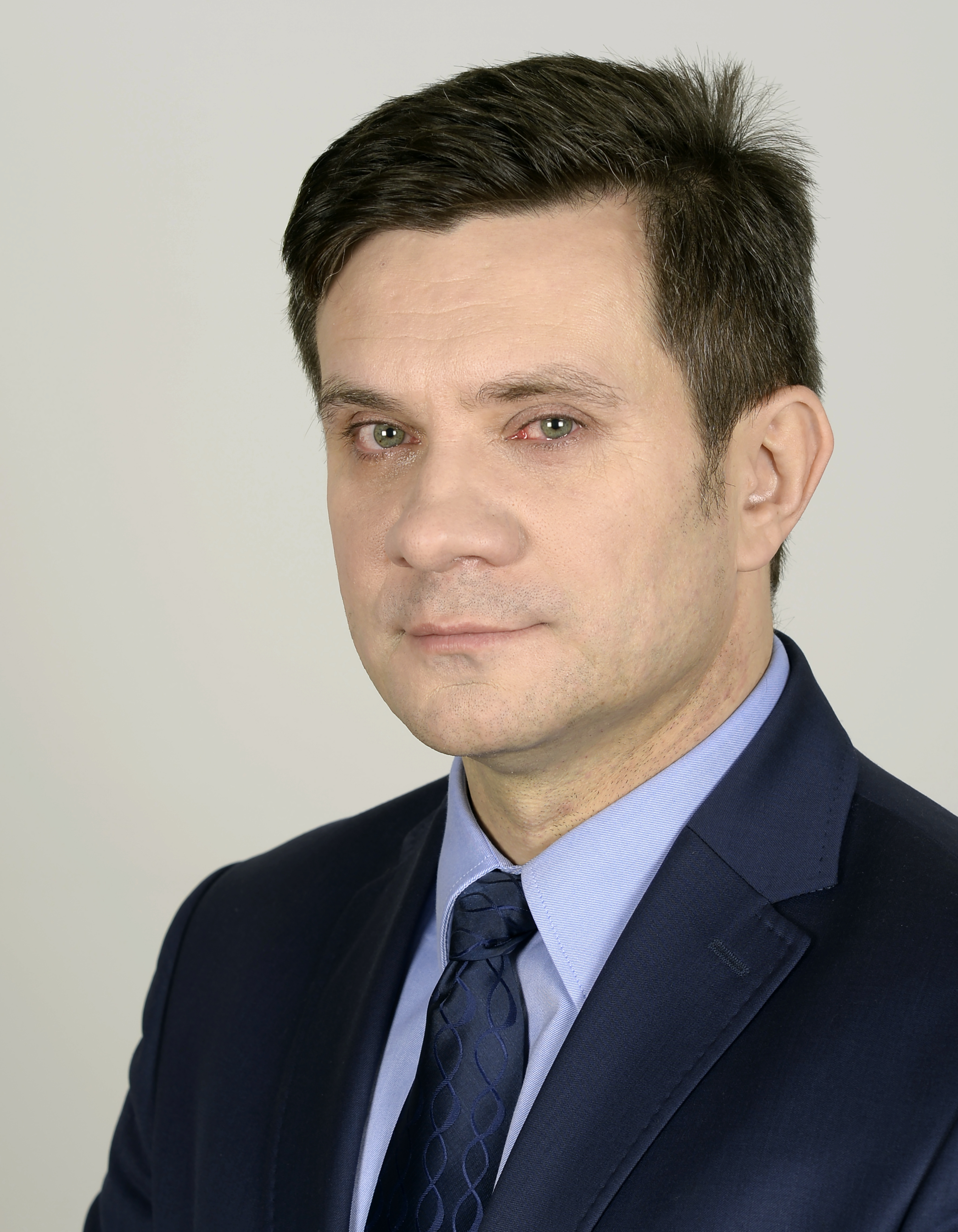

Member of the Senate of Poland

Personal details
- Born: 25 January 1966 (age 60)

Jacek Władysław Włosowicz (born 25 January 1966) is a Polish politician. He was elected to the Senate of Poland (10th term) representing the constituency of Kielce. He was also elected to the 6th term and 9th term of the Senate of Poland.
