= Vienna North (National Council electoral district) =

Parliamentary electoral district in Austria

- Wien Nord
- Electoral District for the National Council
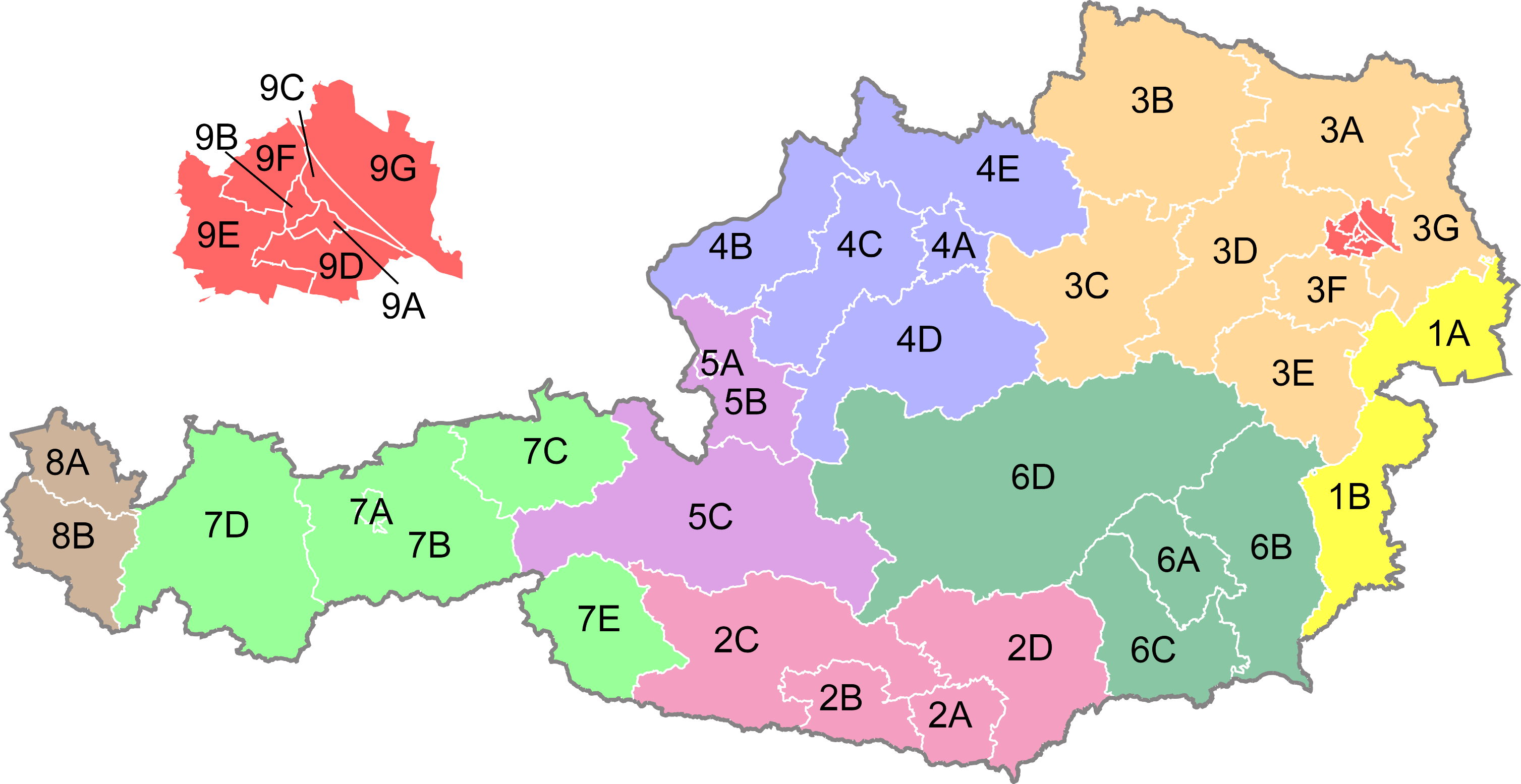
- The 39 regional electotral districts
- District: List: Donaustadt; Floridsdorf
- State: Vienna
- Population: 407,027 (2024)
- Electorate: 234,239 (2019)
- Area: 147 km^{2} (2023)

Current Electoral District
- Created: 1994
- Seats: List: 7 (2024–present); 6 (2002–2024); 5 (1994–2002)
- Members: List: Ruth Becher (SPÖ); Martin Graf (FPÖ); Gudrun Kugler (ÖVP)
- Created from: Vienna

Vienna North (German: Wien Nord), also known as Electoral District 9G (German: Wahlkreis 9G), is one of the 39 multi-member regional electoral districts of the National Council, the lower house of the Austrian Parliament, the national legislature of Austria. The electoral district was created in 1992 when electoral regulations were amended to add regional electoral districts to the existing state-wide electoral districts and came into being at the following legislative election in 1994. It consists of the districts of Donaustadt and Floridsdorf in the city-state of Vienna. The electoral district currently elects seven of the 183 members of the National Council using the open party-list proportional representation electoral system. At the 2019 legislative election the constituency had 234,239 registered electors.

== History ==
Vienna North was one 43 regional electoral districts (regionalwahlkreise) established by the "National Council Electoral Regulations 1992" (Nationalrats-Wahlordnung 1992) passed by the National Council in 1992. It consisted of the districts of Donaustadt and Floridsdorf in the city-state of Vienna. The district was initially allocated five seats in May 1993. Electoral regulations require the allocation of seats amongst the electoral districts to be recalculated following each national census and in September 2002 the number of seats allocated to Vienna North was increased to six based on the population as at the 2001 national census. The number of seats allocated to Vienna North was increased to seven in June 2023 based on the population as at the 2021 national census.

== Electoral system ==
Vienna North currently elects seven of the 183 members of the National Council using the open party-list proportional representation electoral system. The allocation of seats is carried out in three stages. In the first stage, seats are allocated to parties (lists) at the regional level using a state-wide Hare quota (wahlzahl) (valid votes in the state divided by the number of seats in the state). In the second stage, seats are allocated to parties at the state/provincial level using the state-wide Hare quota (any seats won by the party at the regional stage are subtracted from the party's state seats). In the third and final stage, seats are allocated to parties at the federal/national level using the D'Hondt method (any seats won by the party at the regional and state stages are subtracted from the party's federal seats). Only parties that reach the 4% national threshold, or have won a seat at the regional stage, compete for seats at the state and federal stages.

Electors may cast one preferential vote for individual candidates at the regional, state and federal levels. Split-ticket voting (panachage), or voting for more than one candidate at each level, is not permitted and will result in the ballot paper being invalidated. At the regional level, candidates must receive preferential votes amounting to at least 14% of the valid votes cast for their party to over-ride the order of the party list (10% and 7% respectively for the state and federal levels). Prior to April 2013 electors could not cast preferential votes at the federal level and the thresholds candidates needed to over-ride the party list order were higher at the regional level (half the Hare quota or 1/6 of the party votes) and state level (Hare quota).

== Election results ==
=== Summary ===
Election	Communists KPÖ+ / KPÖ			Social Democrats SPÖ			Greens GRÜNE			NEOS NEOS / LiF			People's ÖVP			Freedom FPÖ		
Election	Votes	%	Seats	Votes	%	Seats	Votes	%	Seats	Votes	%	Seats	Votes	%	Seats	Votes	%	Seats
2019	1,043	0.64%	0	47,968	29.53%	1	22,255	13.70%	0	12,884	7.93%	0	42,688	26.28%	1	28,861	17.77%	1
2017	1,568	0.89%	0	60,380	34.46%	2	5,589	3.19%	0	8,133	4.64%	0	34,889	19.91%	1	51,325	29.29%	1
2013	2,002	1.30%	0	56,819	36.80%	2	16,260	10.53%	0	7,941	5.14%	0	16,083	10.42%	0	42,494	27.52%	1
2008	1,458	0.93%	0	63,602	40.52%	2	16,322	10.40%	0	4,406	2.81%	0	17,752	11.31%	0	40,807	26.00%	1
2006	1,536	1.05%	0	71,261	48.73%	2	16,949	11.59%	0				24,024	16.43%	0	24,229	16.57%	0
2002	969	0.64%	0	79,678	52.49%	3	15,690	10.34%	0	2,069	1.36%	0	39,904	26.29%	1	12,281	8.09%	0
1999	1,184	0.84%	0	63,007	44.54%	2	11,181	7.90%	0	7,083	5.01%	0	17,268	12.21%	0	38,253	27.04%	1
1995	667	0.46%	0	73,478	50.79%	2	6,733	4.65%	0	11,350	7.85%	0	20,165	13.94%	0	30,209	20.88%	1
1994	677	0.52%	0	58,837	45.35%	2	10,490	8.09%	0	11,997	9.25%	0	16,027	12.35%	0	29,832	23.00%	1

=== Detailed ===
==== 2010s ====
===== 2019 =====
Results of the 2019 legislative election held on 29 September 2019:

Party		Votes per district			Total votes	%	Seats
Party		Donau- stadt	Florids- dorf	Voting card	Total votes	%	Seats
Social Democratic Party of Austria	SPÖ	25,855	21,658	455	47,968	29.53%	1
Austrian People's Party	ÖVP	23,269	18,866	553	42,688	26.28%	1
Freedom Party of Austria	FPÖ	15,113	13,486	262	28,861	17.77%	1
The Greens – The Green Alternative	GRÜNE	12,849	9,088	318	22,255	13.70%	0
NEOS – The New Austria	NEOS	7,474	5,192	218	12,884	7.93%	0
JETZT	JETZT	2,508	1,949	58	4,515	2.78%	0
The Beer Party	BIER	774	596	21	1,391	0.86%	0
KPÖ Plus	KPÖ+	561	462	20	1,043	0.64%	0
Der Wandel	WANDL	444	368	18	830	0.51%	0
Valid Votes		88,847	71,665	1,923	162,435	100.00%	3
Rejected Votes		866	772	15	1,653	1.01%	
Total Polled		89,713	72,437	1,938	164,088	70.05%	
Registered Electors		127,344	106,895		234,239		
Turnout		70.45%	67.76%		70.05%		

The following candidates were elected:

- Party mandates - Ruth Becher (SPÖ), 1,896 votes; Martin Graf (FPÖ), 1,953 votes; and Gudrun Kugler (ÖVP), 2,637 votes.

===== 2017 =====
Results of the 2017 legislative election held on 15 October 2017:

Party		Votes per district			Total votes	%	Seats
Party		Donau- stadt	Florids- dorf	Voting card	Total votes	%	Seats
Social Democratic Party of Austria	SPÖ	32,927	26,851	602	60,380	34.46%	2
Freedom Party of Austria	FPÖ	26,806	24,041	478	51,325	29.29%	1
Austrian People's Party	ÖVP	19,115	15,324	450	34,889	19.91%	1
Peter Pilz List	PILZ	5,975	4,552	172	10,699	6.11%	0
NEOS – The New Austria	NEOS	4,798	3,182	153	8,133	4.64%	0
The Greens – The Green Alternative	GRÜNE	3,046	2,447	96	5,589	3.19%	0
My Vote Counts!	GILT	1,036	783	23	1,842	1.05%	0
Communist Party of Austria	KPÖ	856	686	26	1,568	0.89%	0
The Whites	WEIßE	109	90	2	201	0.11%	0
Free List Austria	FLÖ	107	82	4	193	0.11%	0
EU Exit Party	EUAUS	94	61	0	155	0.09%	0
Homeless in Politics	ODP	81	67	0	148	0.08%	0
Socialist Left Party	SLP	43	55	1	99	0.06%	0
Valid Votes		94,993	78,221	2,007	175,221	100.00%	4
Rejected Votes		886	728	15	1,629	0.92%	
Total Polled		95,879	78,949	2,022	176,850	76.16%	
Registered Electors		125,695	106,510		232,205		
Turnout		76.28%	74.12%		76.16%		

The following candidates were elected:

- Party mandates - Ruth Becher (SPÖ), 1,816 votes; Gudrun Kugler (ÖVP), 2,040 votes; David Lasar (FPÖ), 1,786 votes; and Angela Lueger (SPÖ), 749 votes.

===== 2013 =====
Results of the 2013 legislative election held on 29 September 2013:

Party		Votes per district			Total votes	%	Seats
Party		Donau- stadt	Florids- dorf	Voting card	Total votes	%	Seats
Social Democratic Party of Austria	SPÖ	30,036	26,190	593	56,819	36.80%	2
Freedom Party of Austria	FPÖ	22,053	20,104	337	42,494	27.52%	1
The Greens – The Green Alternative	GRÜNE	9,099	6,915	246	16,260	10.53%	0
Austrian People's Party	ÖVP	8,486	7,333	264	16,083	10.42%	0
NEOS – The New Austria	NEOS	4,453	3,372	116	7,941	5.14%	0
Team Stronach	FRANK	3,847	3,028	69	6,944	4.50%	0
Alliance for the Future of Austria	BZÖ	2,246	1,813	42	4,101	2.66%	0
Communist Party of Austria	KPÖ	1,115	867	20	2,002	1.30%	0
Pirate Party of Austria	PIRAT	746	628	19	1,393	0.90%	0
Der Wandel	WANDL	123	84	3	210	0.14%	0
Socialist Left Party	SLP	69	67	2	138	0.09%	0
Valid Votes		82,273	70,401	1,711	154,385	100.00%	3
Rejected Votes		1,310	1,190	19	2,519	1.61%	
Total Polled		83,583	71,591	1,730	156,904	69.92%	
Registered Electors		119,484	104,912		224,396		
Turnout		69.95%	68.24%		69.92%		

The following candidates were elected:

- Party mandates - Ruth Becher (SPÖ), 1,017 votes; Hubert Fuchs (FPÖ), 2,535 votes; and Angela Lueger (SPÖ), 1,861 votes.

Hubert Fuchs (FPÖ) was replaced by David Lasar (FPÖ) on 24 June 2016.

==== 2000s ====
===== 2008 =====
Results of the 2008 legislative election held on 28 September 2008:

Party		Votes per district			Total votes	%	Seats
Party		Donau- stadt	Florids- dorf	Voting card	Total votes	%	Seats
Social Democratic Party of Austria	SPÖ	31,897	29,563	2,142	63,602	40.52%	2
Freedom Party of Austria	FPÖ	20,415	19,442	950	40,807	26.00%	1
Austrian People's Party	ÖVP	8,949	8,017	786	17,752	11.31%	0
The Greens – The Green Alternative	GRÜNE	8,780	7,042	500	16,322	10.40%	0
Alliance for the Future of Austria	BZÖ	4,722	4,011	291	9,024	5.75%	0
Liberal Forum	LiF	2,443	1,805	158	4,406	2.81%	0
Communist Party of Austria	KPÖ	718	700	40	1,458	0.93%	0
Fritz Dinkhauser List – Citizens' Forum Tyrol	FRITZ	774	604	43	1,421	0.91%	0
Independent Citizens' Initiative Save Austria	RETTÖ	561	533	38	1,132	0.72%	0
Animal Rights Party	TRP	248	197	20	465	0.30%	0
The Christians	DC	251	185	18	454	0.29%	0
Left	LINKE	66	58	1	125	0.08%	0
Valid Votes		79,824	72,157	4,987	156,968	100.00%	3
Rejected Votes		1,169	1,130	70	2,369	1.49%	
Total Polled		80,993	73,287	5,057	159,337	74.30%	
Registered Electors		111,417	103,029		214,446		
Turnout		72.69%	71.13%		74.30%		

The following candidates were elected:

- Party mandates - Ruth Becher (SPÖ), 2,876 votes; Martin Graf (FPÖ), 3,146 votes; and Angela Lueger (SPÖ), 1,134 votes.

===== 2006 =====
Results of the 2006 legislative election held on 1 October 2006:

Party		Votes per district			Total votes	%	Seats
Party		Donau- stadt	Florids- dorf	Voting card	Total votes	%	Seats
Social Democratic Party of Austria	SPÖ	34,571	32,171	4,519	71,261	48.73%	2
Freedom Party of Austria	FPÖ	11,647	11,514	1,068	24,229	16.57%	0
Austrian People's Party	ÖVP	11,340	10,402	2,282	24,024	16.43%	0
The Greens – The Green Alternative	GRÜNE	8,695	6,952	1,302	16,949	11.59%	0
Hans-Peter Martin's List	MATIN	2,146	1,763	250	4,159	2.84%	0
Alliance for the Future of Austria	BZÖ	1,407	1,450	144	3,001	2.05%	0
Communist Party of Austria	KPÖ	764	706	66	1,536	1.05%	0
EU Withdrawal – Neutral Free Austria	NFÖ	322	303	38	663	0.45%	0
Socialist Left Party	SLP	190	201	13	404	0.28%	0
Valid Votes		71,082	65,462	9,682	146,226	100.00%	2
Rejected Votes		847	838	87	1,772	1.20%	
Total Polled		71,929	66,300	9,769	147,998	72.23%	
Registered Electors		105,524	99,376		204,900		
Turnout		68.16%	66.72%		72.23%		

The following candidates were elected:

- Party mandates - Ruth Becher (SPÖ), 1,753 votes; and Kurt Eder (SPÖ), 3,991 votes.

Kurt Eder (SPÖ) resigned on 31 December 2007 and was replaced by Angela Lueger (SPÖ) on 8 January 2008.

===== 2002 =====
Results of the 2002 legislative election held on 24 November 2002:

Party		Votes per district			Total votes	%	Seats
Party		Donau- stadt	Florids- dorf	Voting card	Total votes	%	Seats
Social Democratic Party of Austria	SPÖ	38,994	37,032	3,652	79,678	52.49%	3
Austrian People's Party	ÖVP	19,471	18,249	2,184	39,904	26.29%	1
The Greens – The Green Alternative	GRÜNE	8,139	6,696	855	15,690	10.34%	0
Freedom Party of Austria	FPÖ	5,984	5,843	454	12,281	8.09%	0
Liberal Forum	LiF	1,004	978	87	2,069	1.36%	0
Communist Party of Austria	KPÖ	500	437	32	969	0.64%	0
Socialist Left Party	SLP	353	416	17	786	0.52%	0
The Democrats		211	188	13	412	0.27%	0
Valid Votes		74,656	69,839	7,294	151,789	100.00%	4
Rejected Votes		837	792	66	1,695	1.10%	
Total Polled		75,493	70,631	7,360	153,484	78.11%	
Registered Electors		100,403	96,088		196,491		
Turnout		75.19%	73.51%		78.11%		

The following candidates were elected:

- Party mandates - Ruth Becher (SPÖ), 2,129 votes; Kurt Eder (SPÖ), 6,102 votes; Dietmar Hoscher (SPÖ), 294 votes; and Ferdinand Maier (ÖVP), 1,837 votes.

==== 1990s ====
===== 1999 =====
Results of the 1999 legislative election held on 3 October 1999:

Party		Votes per district			Total votes	%	Seats
Party		Donau- stadt	Florids- dorf	Voting card	Total votes	%	Seats
Social Democratic Party of Austria	SPÖ	29,734	29,076	4,197	63,007	44.54%	2
Freedom Party of Austria	FPÖ	18,347	17,894	2,012	38,253	27.04%	1
Austrian People's Party	ÖVP	7,910	7,760	1,598	17,268	12.21%	0
The Greens – The Green Alternative	GRÜNE	5,390	4,931	860	11,181	7.90%	0
Liberal Forum	LiF	3,650	2,920	513	7,083	5.01%	0
The Independents	DU	1,285	1,282	136	2,703	1.91%	0
Communist Party of Austria	KPÖ	572	567	45	1,184	0.84%	0
No to NATO and EU – Neutral Austria Citizens' Initiative	NEIN	371	376	51	798	0.56%	0
Valid Votes		67,259	64,806	9,412	141,477	100.00%	3
Rejected Votes		1,067	1,075	97	2,239	1.56%	
Total Polled		68,326	65,881	9,509	143,716	74.68%	
Registered Electors		97,167	95,285		192,452		
Turnout		70.32%	69.14%		74.68%		

The following candidates were elected:

- Party mandates - Kurt Eder (SPÖ), 3,414 votes; Josef Edler (SPÖ), 2,480 votes; and Martin Graf (FPÖ), 3,158 votes.

===== 1995 =====
Results of the 1995 legislative election held on 17 December 1995:

Party		Votes per district			Total votes	%	Seats
Party		Donau- stadt	Florids- dorf	Voting card	Total votes	%	Seats
Social Democratic Party of Austria	SPÖ	34,309	36,471	2,698	73,478	50.79%	2
Freedom Party of Austria	FPÖ	14,308	14,887	1,014	30,209	20.88%	1
Austrian People's Party	ÖVP	9,337	9,816	1,012	20,165	13.94%	0
Liberal Forum	LiF	5,565	5,282	503	11,350	7.85%	0
The Greens – The Green Alternative	GRÜNE	3,168	3,246	319	6,733	4.65%	0
No – Civic Action Group; Against the Sale of Austria	NEIN	843	909	58	1,810	1.25%	0
Communist Party of Austria	KPÖ	309	345	13	667	0.46%	0
Natural Law Party	ÖNP	124	125	2	251	0.17%	0
Valid Votes		67,963	71,081	5,619	144,663	100.00%	3
Rejected Votes		1,112	1,246	45	2,403	1.63%	
Total Polled		69,075	72,327	5,664	147,066	80.38%	
Registered Electors		88,427	94,541		182,968		
Turnout		78.12%	76.50%		80.38%		

The following candidates were elected:

- Party mandates - Kurt Eder (SPÖ), 3,361 votes; Josef Edler (SPÖ), 1,661 votes; and Martin Graf (FPÖ), 1,787 votes.

===== 1994 =====
Results of the 1994 legislative election held on 9 October 1994:

Party		Votes per district			Total votes	%	Seats
Party		Donau- stadt	Florids- dorf	Voting card	Total votes	%	Seats
Social Democratic Party of Austria	SPÖ	26,664	28,641	3,532	58,837	45.35%	2
Freedom Party of Austria	FPÖ	13,785	14,411	1,636	29,832	23.00%	1
Austrian People's Party	ÖVP	7,005	7,666	1,356	16,027	12.35%	0
Liberal Forum	LiF	5,706	5,584	707	11,997	9.25%	0
The Greens – The Green Alternative	GRÜNE	4,833	4,990	667	10,490	8.09%	0
No – Civic Action Group; Against the Sale of Austria	NEIN	639	695	95	1,429	1.10%	0
Communist Party of Austria	KPÖ	338	316	23	677	0.52%	0
Natural Law Party	ÖNP	91	112	12	215	0.17%	0
Citizen Greens Austria – Free Democrats	BGÖ	71	57	6	134	0.10%	0
United Greens Austria – List Adi Pinter	VGÖ	37	47	4	88	0.07%	0
Valid Votes		59,169	62,519	8,038	129,726	100.00%	3
Rejected Votes		846	916	89	1,851	1.41%	
Total Polled		60,015	63,435	8,127	131,577	73.16%	
Registered Electors		86,490	93,362		179,852		
Turnout		69.39%	67.95%		73.16%		

The following candidates were elected:

- Party mandates - Kurt Eder (SPÖ), 3,275 votes; Martin Graf (FPÖ), 1,650 votes; and Hilde Hawlicek (SPÖ), 2,825 votes.

Hilde Hawlicek (SPÖ) resigned on 19 April 1995 and was replaced by Josef Edler (SPÖ) on 21 April 1995.
