= International Catholic Legislators Network =

Private catholic association founded Austria

International Catholic Legislators Network (ICLN)
- Type: Independent association
- Headquarters: Vienna, Austria
- Official languages: German, English
- President and Founder: Christiaan Alting von Geusau
- Vice-President: Manuel Maan Baghdi
- Secretary: Wolfgang Kropf
- Website: https://icln.at/

The International Catholic Legislators Network (ICLN) is a private non-partisan association founded in Trumau, Austria in 2010. It serves as a network for Christian legislators on an international level.

== The ICLN international conference ==
The annual ICLN international conference is mostly held in Rome. The 4-day conference includes a private audience with the Pope at the Vatican. The event aims at supporting and networking within the community of Christian lawmakers worldwide. There have been local and regional ICLN events which have the objective of educating and networking. All meetings and conferences of the ICLN are in camera meaning that the public and the press are not allowed to attend the events. This is to ensure that the invited politicians are able to debate and exchange their thoughts freely. In addition to this, the Chatham House Rule applies to all events.

According to its own statement, to receive an invitation, the politician in question has to meet the following requirements:

"Participation in ICLN events is by personal invitation only and presupposes a visible Catholic or otherwise Christian profile that is reflected in the individual voting record and public statements, especially where it regards the sanctity of human life from the moment of conception until natural death, the true nature of sacramental marriage as the union between one man and one woman, and the commitment to defend the fundamental freedom of religion and conscience as the prime human right of every man and every woman on every continent."

Starting in 2020, regular video conferences for legislators and experts were organised by the ICLN.

== Beliefs and objectives ==
The ICLN's foundation of belief is based on Holy Scripture and the teachings of the Catholic Church.

The ICLN amongst many other topics highlights the following excerpts of the Catechism of the Catholic Church on its website:

=== Protection of Life ===
- Abortion:

"§ 2271 Since the first century the Church has affirmed the moral evil of every procured abortion. This teaching has not changed and remains unchangeable."[6]

"§ 2272 Formal cooperation in an abortion constitutes a grave offense. The Church attaches the canonical penalty of excommunication to this crime against human life."[6]

- Euthanasia: "It is morally unacceptable."
- Contraception: pro calendar-based contraception methods

"'every action which, whether in anticipation of the conjugal act, or in its accomplishment, or in the development of its natural consequences, proposes, whether as an end or as a means, to render procreation impossible' is intrinsically evil"[6]

=== Marriage and the Family ===
- Family structure:

"A man and a woman united in marriage, together with their children, form a family. This institution is prior to any recognition by public authority, which has an obligation to recognize it. It should be considered the normal reference point by which the different forms of family relationship are to be evaluated."[7]

- Divorce: "[A] ratified and consummated marriage cannot be dissolved by any human power or for any reason other than death.", "Divorce is a grave offense against the natural law."
- Pornography: "It offends against chastity because it perverts the conjugal act, the intimate giving of spouses to each other. [...] It immerses all who are involved in the illusion of a fantasy world. It is a grave offense. Civil authorities should prevent the production and distribution of pornographic materials."

=== Biotechnology and Life Sciences ===
"§ 2376 Techniques that entail the dissociation of husband and wife, by the intrusion of a person other than the couple (donation of sperm or ovum, surrogate uterus), are gravely immoral. These techniques (heterologous artificial insemination and fertilization) [...] betray the spouses’ 'right to become a father and a mother only through each other.'"[8]

=== Prevention of persecution of Christians ===
The ICLN claims that Christians are "by far the most under threat, in fact the most persecuted religious group in the world according to the latest data".

== Participants & ties to politics ==
As stated by the Catholic News Agency, the ICLN was founded by Christiaan Alting von Geusau, Cardinal Christoph Schönborn (Austria) and former MP David Alton (United Kingdom) in 2010. In the register of associations Austrian chief of staff to the chancellor (ÖVP) Bernhard Bonelli is listed as a co-founder of the ICLN in 2010. As stated by Austrian Kathpress ("Austrian Catholic News Agency"), Bernhard Bonelli also coordinated the ICLN annual conferences until 2015. Other Austrian participants of the ICLN are Lukas Mandl (MEP for ÖVP, member of the ICLN Steering Committee) and Gudrun Kugler (ÖVP).

In 2019, the ICLN organised an event in Fátima, Portugal. Among the attendees were Hungarian prime minister Viktor Orbán, Donald Trump’s chief of staff Mick Mulvaney and Hongkong Cardinal Joseph Zen. Portuguese newspaper Público states that the ICLN event required the deployment of two hundred police personnel, and that this operation was funded by the Portuguese state although the event was not on a national or governmental occasion.

== Saint Thomas More Religious Freedom Advocacy Award ==
The award is named after Lord Chancellor Sir Thomas More. It was first given in 2017 to the British Member of the House of Lords David Alton who fought against the persecution of Christians worldwide. Other awardees are Gudrun Kogler (MP for ÖVP, Austria), Lucy Akello (MP for Forum for Democratic Change, Uganda) and Daniel Lipinski (former Democratic member of the US Congress, an objector of same-sex marriage).

== See also ==
- Eucharist denial to Catholic politicians over abortion
- Catholic Church and abortion
- Catholic Church and homosexuality
