= Münchhausen Prize =

German award

The Münchhausen Prize was instituted in 1997, the 200th anniversary of the death of the historical Baron von Münchhausen. It is awarded in May each year in Bodenwerder, the Baron's hometown, for special talent in the art of speaking or presentation, either in literature or the visual arts, fantasy and satire, in the sense of the Baron. The prize money is €2,556.

== Recipients ==
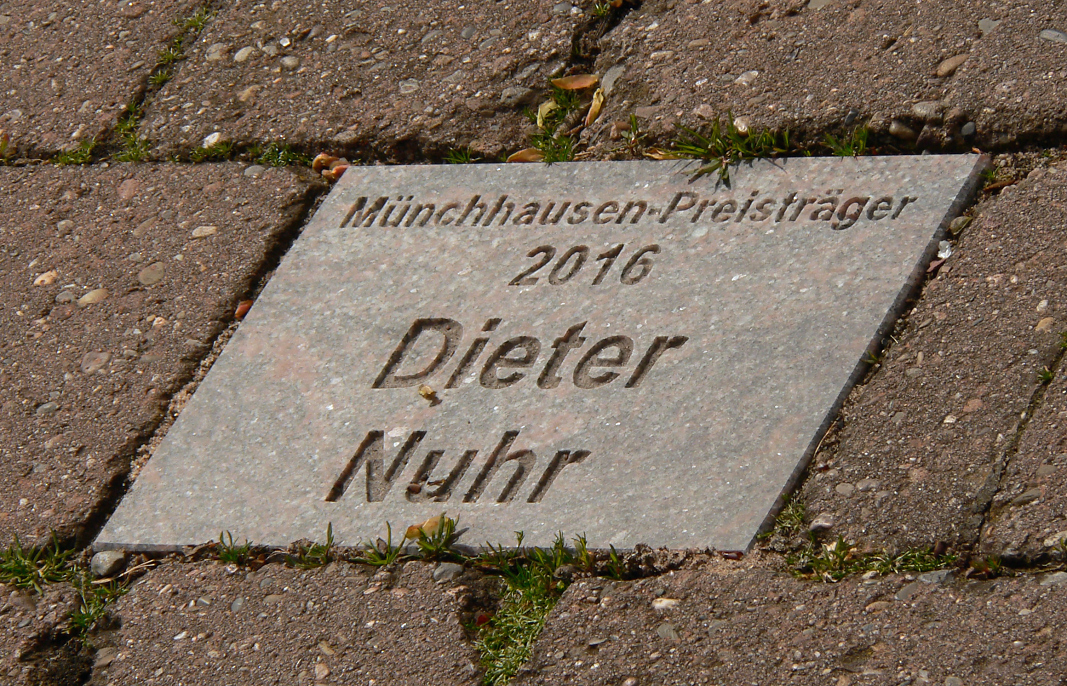
Münchhausen Prize 2016 Dieter Nuhr

- 1997: Dieter Hildebrandt
- 1998: Wolfgang Völz
- 1999: Werner Schneyder
- 2000: Norbert Blüm
- 2001: Ephraim Kishon
- 2002: Evelyn Hamann
- 2003: Bruno Jonas
- 2004: Wolfgang Stumph
- 2005: Rudi Carrell
- 2006: Günter Willumeit
- 2007: Tony Marshall
- 2008: Jürgen von der Lippe
- 2009: Emil Steinberger
- 2010: Götz Alsmann
- 2011: Eckart von Hirschhausen
- 2012: Herman van Veen
- 2013: Frank Elstner
- 2014: Dieter Hallervorden
- 2015: Annette Frier
- 2016: Dieter Nuhr
- 2018: Christoph Maria Herbst
- 2022: Andreas Rebers
