= Götz Alsmann =

German musician and singer

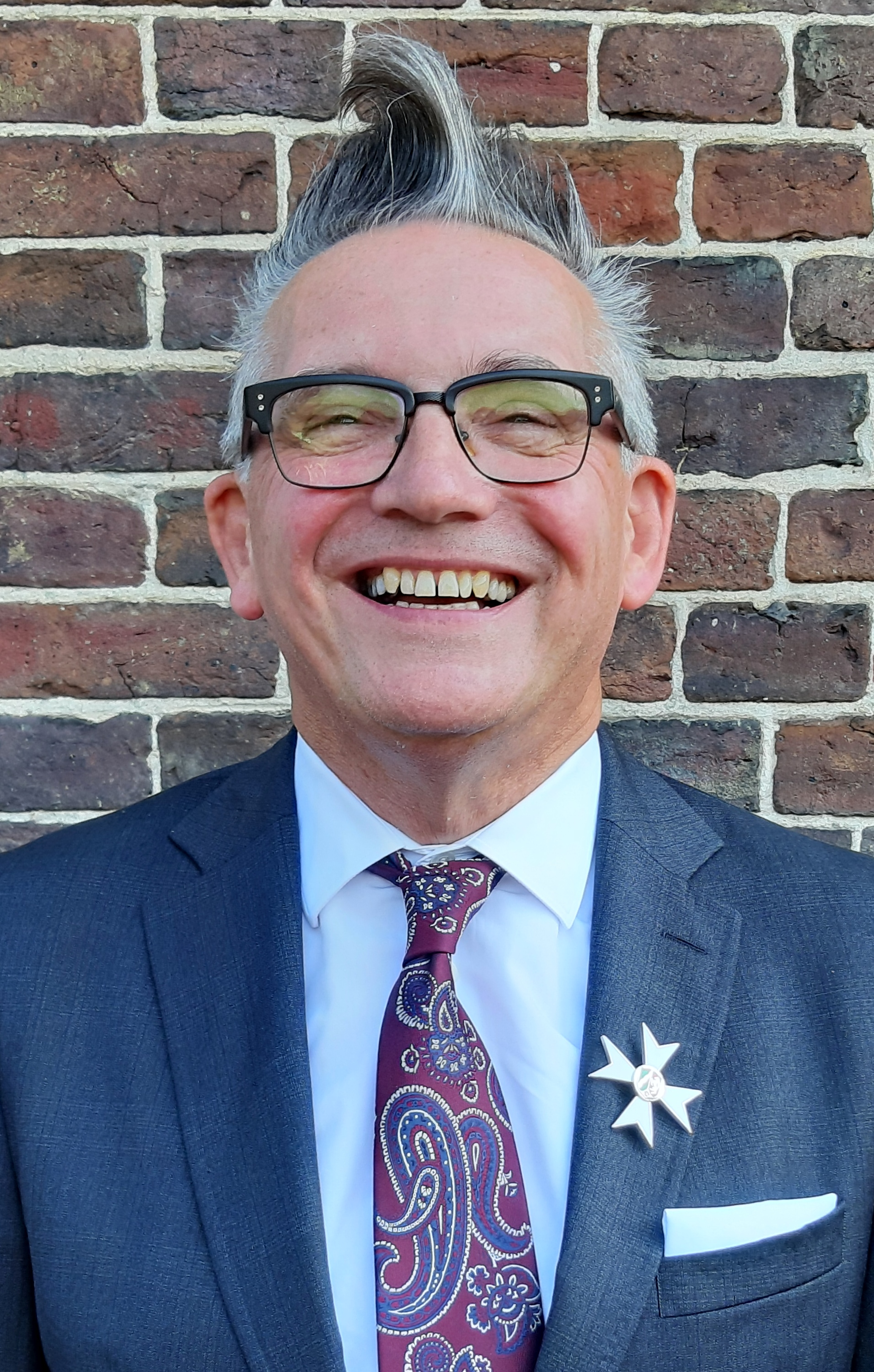
Alsmann in 2019

Götz Alsmann (born 12 July 1957) is a German musician, singer and former television presenter.

== Life ==
Götz Alsmann was born in Münster in 1957, the son of bricklayer Erich Alsmann and his wife Leni, who came from Yugoslavia. At the age of eight, he received piano lessons in his neighborhood and quickly decided to pursue music professionally. In 1964, he started school at the Josefschule in Münster.

In 1973, he joined the Heupferd Jug Band, whose first album was released in 1974 with the 17-year-old Alsmann playing piano, mandolin and banjo. Two more albums followed in 1977 and 1979. At the same time, Alsmann began working as a studio musician in the Netherlands, where he played on numerous country music and dialect music productions.

After graduating from the Johann-Conrad-Schlaun-Gymnasium in Münster and completing his military service, Alsmann studied German Studies, Journalism, and Musicology at the University of Münster from 1977 onwards. He completed his Musicology studies in 1985 with a doctorate (Dr. phil.) (dissertation title: Nothing But Noise: The Independent Record Companies and the Development of American Popular Music 1943–1963 (German: Nichts als Krach: Die unabhängigen Schallplattenfirmen und die Entwicklung der amerikanischen populären Musik 1943–1963).

In 1996, Alsmann played Lothar Alzheim, a supermarket cashier and bandleader, in the comedy *Alles wegen Robert de Niro* (All Because of Robert De Niro) with Angelika Milster, directed by Helmut Förnbacher. From 2006 to 2008, his Michael Jary revue *Ich weiß, es wird einmal ein Wunder gescheh'n* (I Know a Miracle Will Happen Someday) was performed at the Münster Municipal Theatre over three seasons, in which he also appeared on stage with his band. In July 2011, Alsmann was appointed honorary professor at the University of Münster, where he teaches the history of popular music. On February 7, 2012, Alsmann delivered his inaugural lecture. Alsmann lives in Münster, is married, and has a son.

== Awards ==
- 2000: Adolf Grimme Award for Zimmer frei!
- 2004: Echo
- 2006: Goldene Stimmgabel
- 2010: Münchhausen Prize

== Biography ==
- Götz Alsmann – Fast ein Selbstportrait (A film by Klaus Michael Heinz, WDR Television, 8 July 2017)

== Discography ==
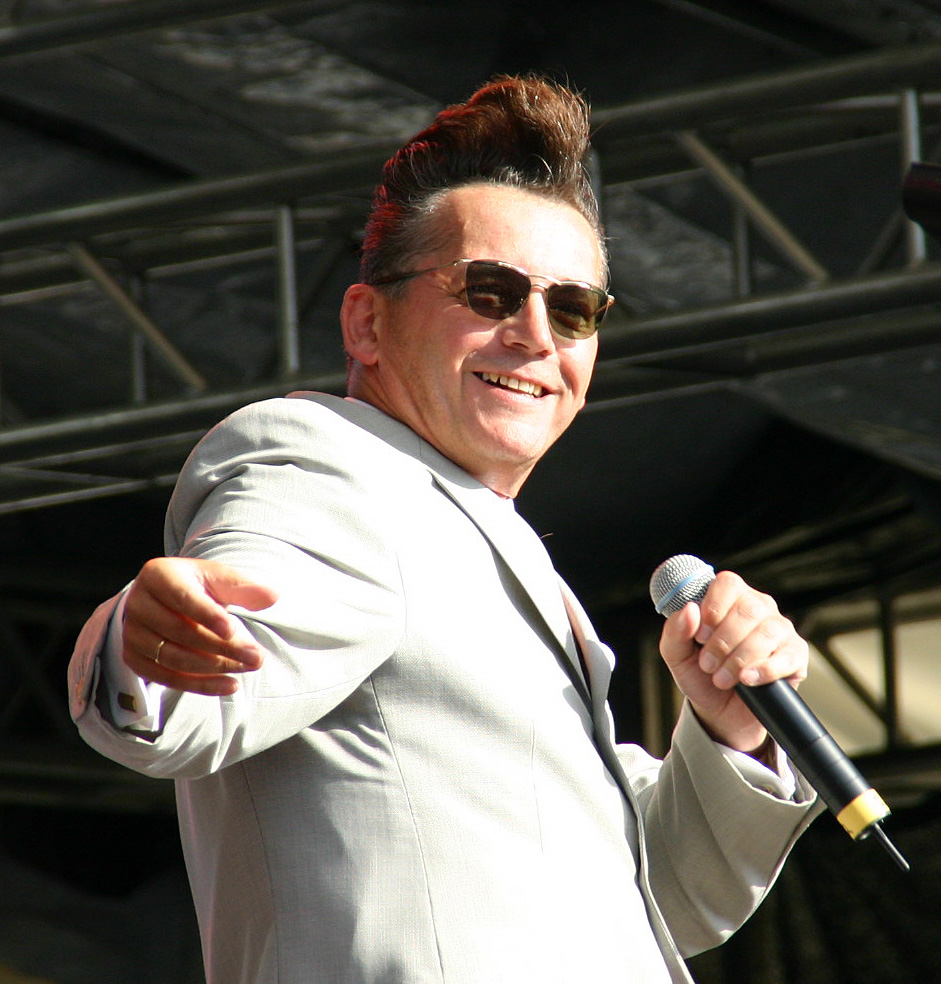
Alsmann performing in 2005

=== With Heupferd ===
- Skiffle-Ragtime-Jug Band Musik 1 (1974)
- Come on in! (1977)
- Mama’s Little Sunny Boys (1979)

=== Götz Alsmann and the Sentimental Pounders ===
- Hip to the Tip / Bird Walk (1981)
- People Are People / Lonesome Pine (1985)
- Bop Caliente / Mad at You (1985)

=== Albums ===
- Party Time (1982)
- Saratoga Suitcase (1985)
- 12 to 6 (1988)
- Big Bamboo (1993)
- Zazou (1995)
- Gestatten… Götz Alsmann (1997)
- Zimmer frei! (1998)
- Zuckersüß (1999)
- Filmreif (2001)
- In 80 Tagen um die Welt (2002)
- Tabu! (2003)
- Die Feuerzangenbowle (2003)
- Drei Mann in einem Boot (2005)
- Kuss (2005)
- Max und Moritz und andere Lieblingswerke (2006)
- Winterwunderwelt (2006)
- Zirkus Alsmann – Das Beste von Götz Alsmann (2007)
- Mein Geheimnis (2007)
- Ich bin nicht Karl May (2007)
- Der Hund von Baskerville (2008)
- Engel oder Teufel (2009)
- Herrenabend (2010)
- In Paris (2011)
- Am Broadway (2014)
- Winterwunderwelt Vol. 2 (2015)
- In Rom (2017)
- eventuell... (2018)
- L.I.E.B.E. (2019)
- Bei Nacht (2024)

=== Guest contributions ===
- 1985: Sunny Domestozs (LP Barkin’ at the Moon)
- 1989: The Keytones (LP The Keytones Meet Götz Alsmann)
- 1995: Die Fabulösen Thekenschlampen (CD Titten Theken Temperamente)
- 1996: Jazzkantine (LP Frisch gepresst & live)
- 1999: Die Ärzte („Punk ist...“, B-side of the single Rebell)
- 2006: In Extremo (CD Kein Blick Zurück, Singapur)
- 2006: Reinhard Mey (CD Hommage, Das Alles war ich ohne dich)
- 2009: Bela B. (Single schwarz/weiss – Track Geisterreiter)

== Writings ==
- Stefan Blankertz / Götz Alsmann: Rock ’n’ Roll subversiv. Büchse der Pandora, Wetzlar 1979. ISBN 3-88178-030-0.
- Nichts als Krach. Die unabhängigen Schallplattenfirmen und die Entwicklung der amerikanischen populären Musik 1943–1963. Huba, Drensteinfurt 1985. ISBN 3-9800414-9-2.
