= Norbert Blüm =

German politician (1935–2020)

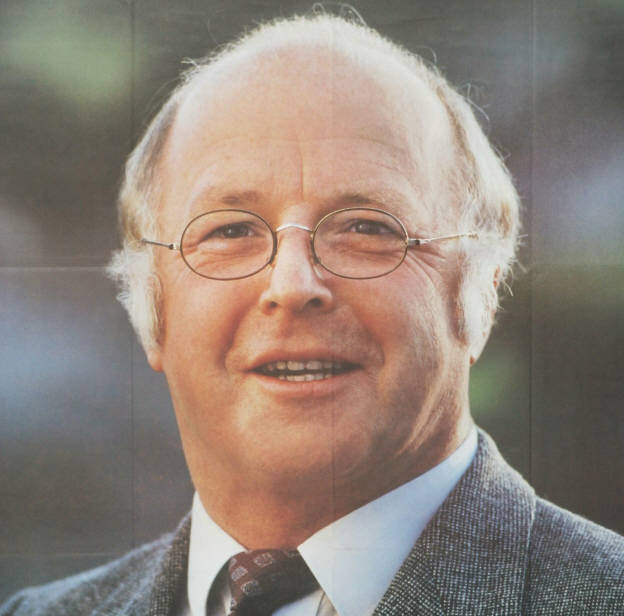
- Blüm in 1987

Minister of Labour and Social Affairs
- In office 4 October 1982 – 27 October 1998
- Chancellor: Helmut Kohl
- Preceded by: Heinz Westphal
- Succeeded by: Walter Riester

Member of the Bundestag for Rhineland-Palatinate
- In office 1972–1981

Member of the Bundestag for North Rhine-Westphalia
- In office 1983–2002

Personal details
- Born: 21 July 1935 Rüsselsheim am Main, Hesse, Germany
- Died: 23 April 2020 (aged 84) Bonn, North Rhine-Westphalia, Germany
- Party: CDU
- Spouse: Marita Blüm (née Binger) (m. 1964)
- Children: 3
- Education: University of Bonn; University of Cologne
- Awards: Münchhausen Prize (2000); Leipzig Human Rights Award (2001); Leopold Kunschak Prize (2005)

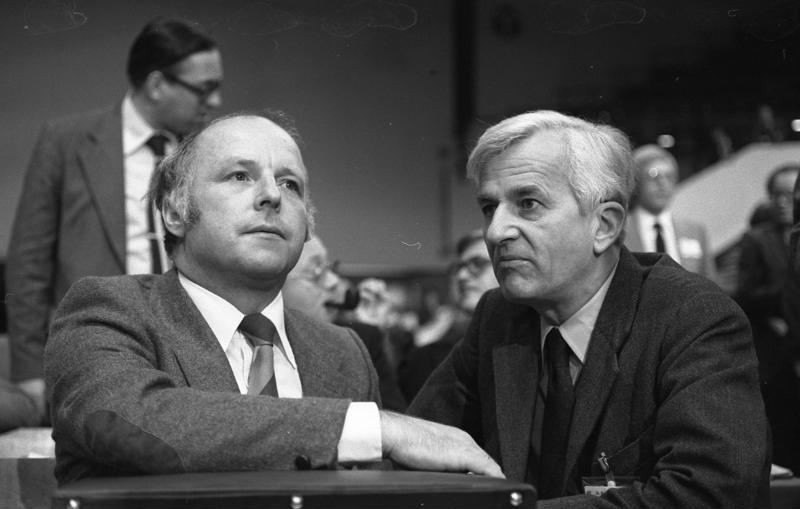
Norbert Blüm (left) with Richard von Weizsäcker in 1978

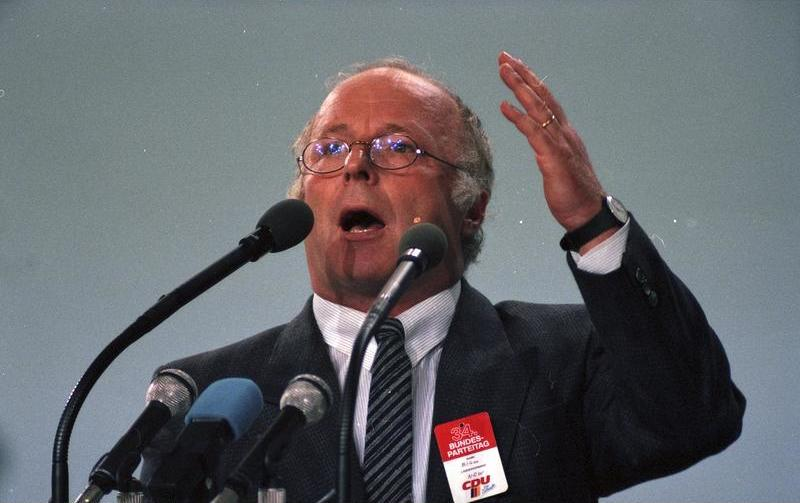
Norbert Blüm in 1986

Norbert Blüm (German: [ˈnɔʁbɛʁt ˈblyːm]; 21 July 1935 – 23 April 2020) was a German politician who served as a federal legislator from North Rhine-Westphalia, chairman of the CDU North Rhine-Westphalia (1987–1999), and Minister of Labour and Social Affairs.

Blüm was the only cabinet member who served in his function for all sixteen years of Helmut Kohl's time as Chancellor of Germany. He served as a member of the Bundestag from 1972 to 1981 and again from 1983 to 2002. Blüm was part of the left wing of the conservative Christian Democratic Union (CDU).

== Early life and education ==
Born in Rüsselsheim am Main, Blüm attended the Volksschule. In 1950, aged 15, Blüm joined the CDU. This year he also joined the IG Metall. That's why he often was nicknamed Herz-Jesu-Marxist. He trained and worked locally as a toolmaker for Opel from 1949 to 1957. He was engaged in the factory as a youth representative. During this time, he was a founding member of the local Boy Scouts affiliation, the Deutsche Pfadfinderschaft Sankt Georg. In 1961 he passed his Abitur at an Abendgymnasium in Mainz, thereby obtaining the university entrance qualification.

He studied German language and literature, history, philosophy and theology at the University of Bonn and University of Cologne until 1967. One of his teachers was Joseph Ratzinger. In 1967, he received his doctorate of philosophy (PhD) in Bonn with the dissertation Willenslehre und Soziallehre bei Ferdinand Tönnies. Ein Beitrag zum Verständnis von "Gemeinschaft und Gesellschaft".

== Career ==
=== Career in national politics ===
Blüm was a member of the Bundestag for the CDU from 1972 to 1981 and again from 1983 to 2002.

From 1977 to 1987 Blüm was chairman of the Christian Democratic Employees' Association. He was a member of the CDU federal executive committee from 1969 to 2000. He was vice chairman of the federal CDU from 1981 to 1990 and again from 1992 to 2000.

=== Career in state politics ===
From 1981 to 1982 Blüm served as Senator of Berlin.

=== Minister for Labour and Social Affairs, 1982–1998 ===
Blüm was Federal Minister for Labour and Social Affairs from 1982 to 1998. As minister, he was responsible for reforms and changes in the pension system. His greatest political success was the introduction of long-term care insurance (Pflegeversicherung) in 1995, after those reform plans were hotly and controversially debated in the Bundestag.

Blüm served as chairman of the CDU of the state of North Rhine-Westphalia from 1987 to 1999.

== Political positions ==
Blüm adhered to Christian values and belonged to the left wing of the generally centre-right CDU. Blüm was strongly influenced by the Jesuit social philosopher Oswald von Nell-Breuning, one of the founders of the modern Catholic social teaching who lectured in Frankfurt. Nell-Breuning taught Blüm about the main three pillars "subsidiarity", "solidarity" and "charity".

During his time in office, Blüm held out and pushed back against demands by fellow CDU politicians to raise the federal retirement age from 65 to 70.

A popular quotation attributed to him is "Die Rente ist sicher" (loosely translated as: "Pensions are safe"), (Note: Bundestag, 10 October 1997.) based on the governmental slogan he wielded in 1986: "Eins ist sicher: Die Rente" ("One thing is safe: pensions"). This quotation quickly gained notoriety in Germany and became a popular target for comedy, as well as a cynical reference that would be used by his opponents and critics for years to come.

The politician was a fervent supporter of human rights. On a trip to Chile in 1987, he accused former dictator Augusto Pinochet of torture.

Blüm once said that "politics is a struggle". "Whoever is in search of harmony must look for another profession. (...) But if you want to change something, you cannot please everybody."

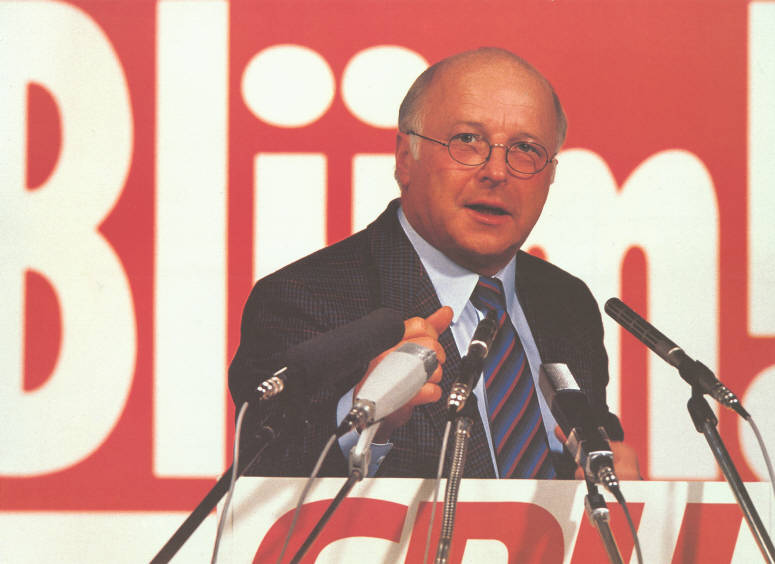
Blüm (1990) giving a speech in the state election campaign of North Rhine-Westphalia

Core issues of his politics were social justice and the fight against unemployment. For Blüm, "the little people" were important, which is why he tried to prevent a division of society into rich and poor with his politics. He saw social peace threatened by the Agenda 2010 that was later passed by the German government.

Blüm was an outspoken critic of Scientology. As a consequence, he was targeted by Scientology advocates, who would claim that the organization was a victim of religious discrimination in Germany.

Despite his good relationship with Helmut Kohl, Blüm criticized his handling of the CDU donations scandal.

After his departure from the Bundestag in 2002, he continued to comment on political issues publicly. Because of his criticism of Israel in the Middle East conflict, he was sometimes accused of antisemitism, which he rejected.

In 2016, he criticised the CDU's refugee policy because of the cold-hearted discussion about refugees. During the refugee crisis, the former minister visited the Greek refugee camp Idomeni in 2016 and heavily criticized the EU's treatment of refugees ("This kind of brutality is unworthy of European culture"). Out of solidarity he slept one night in the refugee camp.

In 2016 he opposed an unconditional basic income, on which Switzerland held a referendum at this time. It would be "unfair" and an "attempted escape from welfare state responsibility".

== Personal life ==
Blüm married Marita Blüm (née Binger) in 1964. The couple had three children, a son and two daughters. Blüm was a practising Roman Catholic.

After blood poisoning in 2019, Blüm became paralysed in his arms and legs. He commented in a guest article for the German weekly Die Zeit in March 2020 about his new life in a wheelchair due to his paralysis, in which he compared his position to that of a puppet whose strings were pulled so that its parts dangled incoherently in the air: "Like a thief in the night, disaster broke into my life in the form of insidious blood poisoning".

Blüm died in Bonn on 23 April 2020.

== Other activities ==
- Member of the Advisory Board of the Hans Böckler Prize of the City of Cologne
- Green Helmets, Member of the Board of Trustees
- Bonn Minster, Member of the Board of Trustees
- St. Maria zur Wiese, Member of the Board of Trustees
- IG Metall, Member (since 1949)

== Awards ==
- 2000: Münchhausen Prize
- 2001: Leipzig Human Rights Award
- 2005: Leopold Kunschak Prize
