= Leopold Kunschak Prize =

The Leopold-Kunschak-Prize is awarded annually since 1965 by the Austrian People's Party (ÖVP) for distinguished works on the areas of Human sciences, Social science and Economics. Further, complimentary awards are awarded. The prize is named after the Austrian politician Leopold Kunschak (1871–1953) of the Christian Social Party of Austria. The awarding is held annually in March, on Kunschak's day of death. Wolfgang Mazal is president of the scientific commission for appraisal.

== Winners ==
The importance of the award becomes clear by the particular awardings. Examples of the awardees are persons like:

- Pope Benedict XVI (1991)
- Norbert Blüm
- Jean-Claude Juncker (2009)
- Gudrun Kugler
- Silvius Magnago
- Andreas Maislinger
- Wilfried Martens
- Franz Schausberger
- László Tőkés
- Lech Wałęsa (2008)
