= David Lasar =

Austrian politician (born 1952)

Member of the National Council
- Incumbent
- Assumed office 24 June 2016
- Constituency: 9G Vienna North

Personal details
- Born: 5 October 1952 (age 73) Vienna, Austria
- Party: Freedom Party of Austria

David Lasar (born 5 October 1952) is an Austrian politician who has been a Member of the National Council for the Freedom Party of Austria (FPÖ) since 2016.
