= Ruth Becher =

Austrian politician (born 1956)

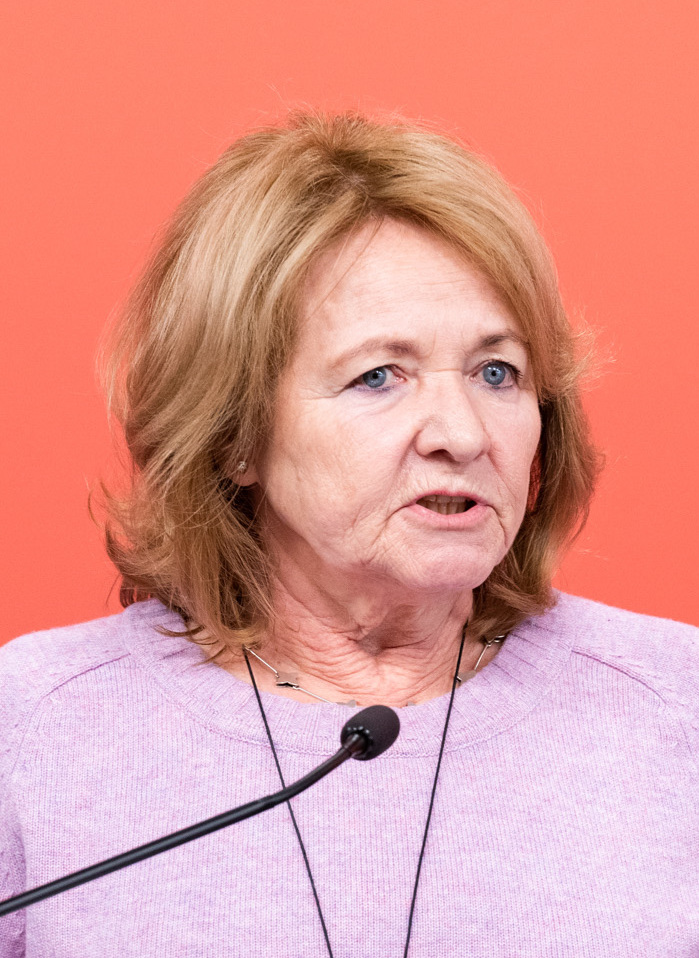
- Becher in February 2021

Member of the National Council
- In office 20 December 2002 – 23 October 2024
- Constituency: Vienna North

Member of the Municipal Council and Landtag of Vienna
- In office 9 December 1987 – 19 December 2002
- Constituency: Donaustadt

Personal details
- Born: 28 January 1956 (age 70) Vienna, Austria
- Party: Social Democratic Party
- Education: University of Vienna

Ruth Becher (born 28 January 1956) is an Austrian politician and former member of the National Council. A member of the Social Democratic Party, she represented Vienna North from December 2002 to October 2024. She was a member of the Municipal Council and Landtag of Vienna from December 1987 to December 2002.

Becher was born on 28 January 1956 in Vienna. She studied German and history at the University of Vienna. She was a vocational school teacher from 1984 to 2001. She was chair of the Vienna Tenants' Association (Wiener Mietervereinigung) from 1994 to 2002.

Becher has held various positions in the Viennese branch of the Social Democratic Party (SPÖ) from 1989 to 2002. She was a member of the Municipal Council and Landtag of Vienna for the Donaustadt electoral district from December 1987 to December 2002. She was elected to the National Council at the 2002 legislative election.

Electoral history of Ruth Becher
Election	Electoral district	Party	Votes	%	Result
1994 legislative	Vienna North	Social Democratic Party	583	0.99%	Not elected
1994 legislative	Vienna	Social Democratic Party	21	0.01%	Not elected
1994 legislative	Federal List	Social Democratic Party	-	-	Not elected
1995 legislative	Vienna North	Social Democratic Party	649	0.88%	Not elected
1995 legislative	Vienna	Social Democratic Party	9	0.00%	Not elected
1995 legislative	Federal List	Social Democratic Party	-	-	Not elected
1999 legislative	Vienna North	Social Democratic Party	631	1.48%	Not elected
1999 legislative	Vienna	Social Democratic Party	10	0.00%	Not elected
1999 legislative	Federal List	Social Democratic Party	-	-	Not elected
2002 legislative	Vienna North	Social Democratic Party	2,129	2.67%	Elected
2002 legislative	Federal List	Social Democratic Party	-	-	Not elected
2006 legislative	Vienna North	Social Democratic Party	1,753	2.46%	Elected
2006 legislative	Federal List	Social Democratic Party	-	-	Not elected
2008 legislative	Vienna North	Social Democratic Party	2,876	4.52%	Elected
2008 legislative	Federal List	Social Democratic Party	-	-	Not elected
2013 legislative	Vienna North	Social Democratic Party	1,017	1.79%	Elected
2013 legislative	Vienna	Social Democratic Party	78	0.03%	Not elected
2013 legislative	Federal List	Social Democratic Party	50	0.00%	Not elected
2017 legislative	Vienna North	Social Democratic Party	1,816	3.01%	Elected
2017 legislative	Vienna	Social Democratic Party	101	0.03%	Not elected
2017 legislative	Federal List	Social Democratic Party	46	0.00%	Not elected
2019 legislative	Vienna North	Social Democratic Party	1,896	3.95%	Elected
2019 legislative	Vienna	Social Democratic Party	99	0.04%	Not elected
2019 legislative	Federal List	Social Democratic Party	91	0.01%	Not elected
