= Eckart von Hirschhausen =

German physician, talk show host and comedian

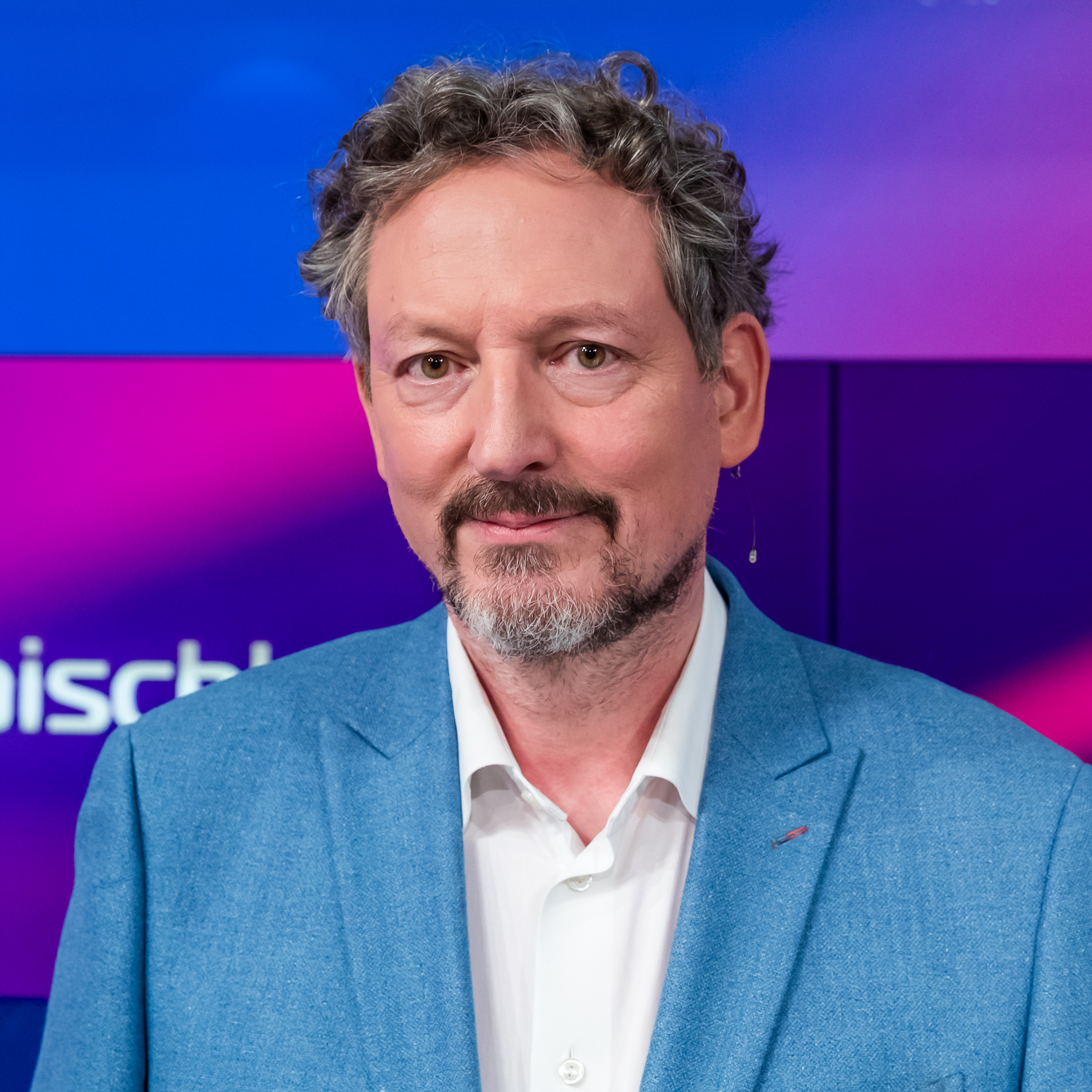
- Von Hirschhausen in 2025
- Born: 25 August 1967 (age 58); Frankfurt, West Germany
- Occupations: Physician; comedian; talk show host; author; journalist
- Website: hirschhausen.com

Eckart Axel von Hirschhausen (born 25 August 1967) is a German physician, talk show host, comedian, author, and journalist.

== Academic career ==
Born in Frankfurt, von Hirschhausen studied medicine, supported by a scholarship from the Studienstiftung des deutschen Volkes (German Academic Scholarship Foundation), at the Free University of Berlin, the University of Heidelberg and the University of London. The subject of his doctoral thesis was Efficiency of intravenous immunoglobulin therapy on pigs in the hyperdynamic phase of endotoxemia and he graduated magna cum laude from the University of Heidelberg. From 1996 to 1997, he studied scientific journalism at the Free University of Berlin, but without taking a degree.

== Journalism and television ==
In 1996, von Hirschhausen started writing, mainly for Focus and Der Tagesspiegel. His first appearance on television is believed to have been as a guest contestant performing magic tricks in Jürgen von der Lippe's show Geld oder Liebe ('Money or Love'). From 1998 to 2003, he hosted the weekly health advisory show Service: Gesundheit ('Service: Health') on Hessischer Rundfunk Television. Since 2004 he has been a weekly contributor to Stern: Sprechstunde ("Stern: Consultation Hour"): his column is called Die Etwas Andere Medizinkolumne ("The Somewhat Different Medicine Column").

Since the mid-1990s, von Hirschhausen has performed as a stand-up comedian, show host and magician in variety. He is also a cabaret artist performing his own, and other, cabaret programmes. He was a guest artist in Berlin, in London and at the Cologne Comedy Festival 1997. Hirschhausen was also a member of the panels of contributors to the Knoff-Hoff-Show on ZDF and 7 Tage, 7 Köpfe ('7 days, 7 heads') on RTL. Since 21 January 2004, he has been answering viewers' questions in his column Dr. von Hirschhausen wills wissen ('Dr. von Hirschhausen wants to know') in the scientific television show W wie Wissen ('K for Knowledge') on ARD. In Hirschhausens Wissensbisse ('Hirschhausen's knowledge-bites') he also presents strange news and facts from the world of scientific research. Hirschhausen is a regular on the cabaret show Ottis Schlachthof ('Otti's Slaughterhouse') on Bayerisches Fernsehen and Quatsch Comedy Club on Pro Sieben. In 2007, he was a frequent guest on the ARD show 'Schmidt and Pocher'. He is also a speaker specialising in communication and motivational training. At the end of 2008, he founded a charity foundation 'Humor hilft heilen – für mehr gesundes Lachen im Krankenhaus' ('Humour helps the healing process – for more healthy laughing in hospitals'). Since September 2009, he has co-hosted the successor show of 'Die Tietjen und Dibaba' on NDR with Bettina Tietjen.

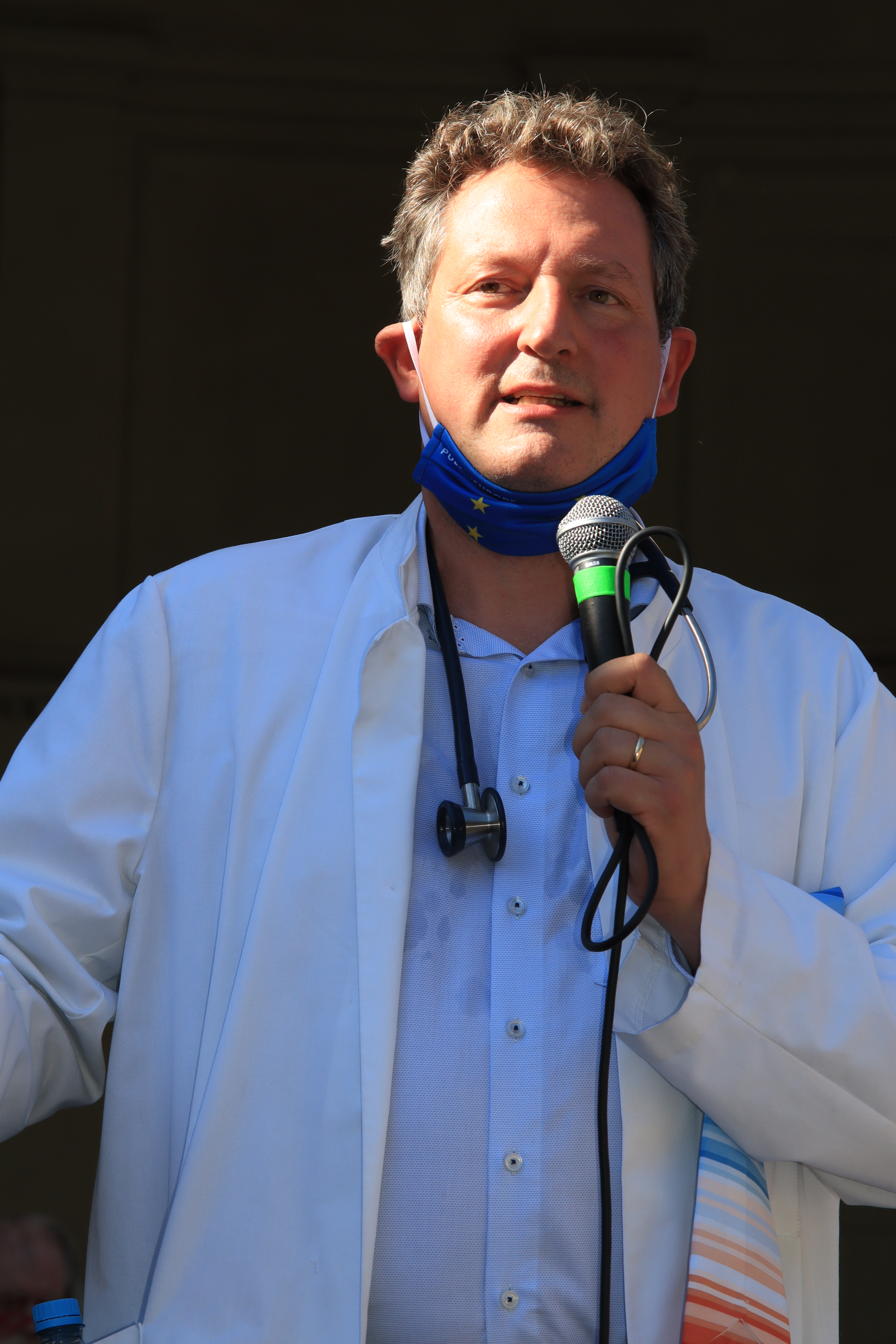
Von Hirschhausen in 2020

Von Hirschhausen has developed a cabaret routine similar to that of Ludger Stratmann, also a PhD medical doctor and cabaret artist. They both focus on the doctor-patient relationship, while von Hirschhausen specifically points out the inability and unwillingness of professionals in his field to express themselves clearly. He also focuses on the typical routines and rituals which, when separated from the professional environment, appear comical and absurd.

== Other activities ==
- Senckenberg Nature Research Society, Member of the Board of Trustees

== Awards ==
Von Hirschhausen's program Filetspitzen was awarded the 'Garchinger Kleinkunstpreis' ('Garching Award for minor arts') in 2001. Hirschhausen also won the 'Garchinger Maske' in 2000, the 'Paulaner-Solo Kabarettpreis' in 2003, the 'Jurypreis des Berliner Kleinkunstfestivals' ('Jury's Prize of the Berlin Festival of Minor Arts') and the 'RTL Comedy Cup'. On 14 September 2004, he was awarded the 'St. Ingberter Pfanne', one of the most important German awards for minor arts. Hirschhausen is the current German champion of magic tricks. He was also awarded the 2011 Münchhausen Prize at Bodenwerder.

Von Hirschhausen was a supporter of the 'Pro Reli-Kampagne', a campaign to preserve religious education in Berlin's public schools. Berlin's voters, however, decided in a referendum in April 2009 not to keep religious education in their schools.

Von Hirschhausen was awarded the title 'Krawattenmann des Jahres 2009' ('Tie-man of the year 2009') on 3 December 2009. He received this honor from the 'Deutsche Mode Institut (DMI/Köln)' ('German Institute for Fashion, Cologne') in Krefeld.

In 2012, von Hirschhausen was honored with the IQ Award.

== Personal life ==
Von Hirschhausen has been a lifelong resident of Berlin. His brother is the economist Christian von Hirschhausen (born 1964).
