= Martin Graf =

Austrian politician (born 1960)

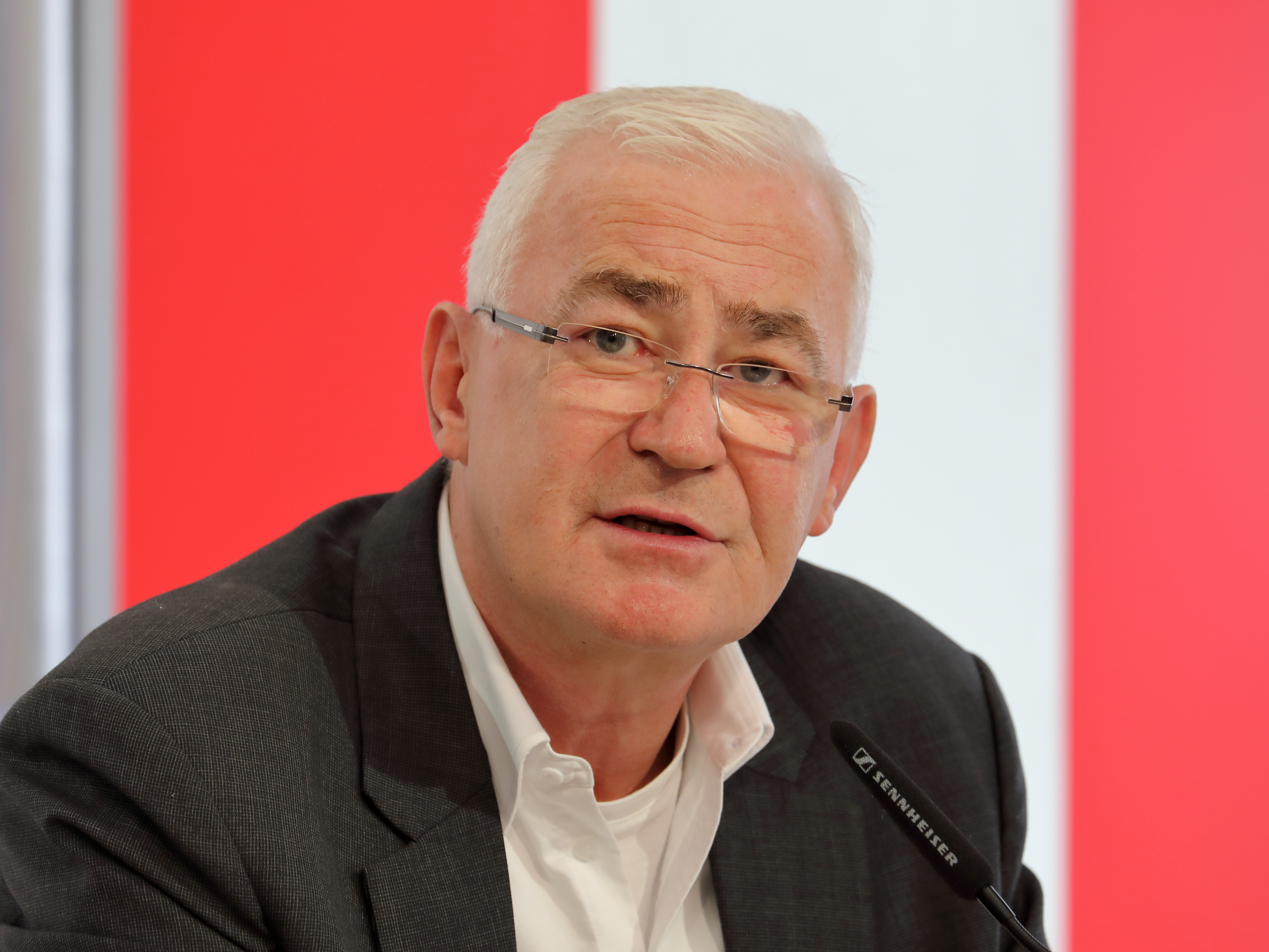
- Graf in 2020
- Born: 11 May 1960 (age 65); Vienna, Austria

Martin Graf (born 11 May 1960) is an Austrian politician. He is a member of the Freedom Party of Austria and former third president of the Austrian Parliament.

== Biography ==
Graf was born in Vienna and studied law at the University of Vienna. He graduated in 1987 and trained as a lawyer. In his student days, he became a member of the student fraternity Burschenschaft Olympia. From 1994 to 2002 and again since 2006, he has been a member of the Austrian Parliament. The years in between, he was managing director of the Austrian Research Centers; from 2000 until 2006 he also served as a board member of the PVA, a government-owned insurance company. Graf is the president of Viennese football club FC Hellas Kagran. He is married and has three children.

== Criticism ==
Following the 2008 general election which put the Freedom Party in third place, on 28 October 2008, he was elected the National Council's third president, despite heavy opposition by the Green Party of Austria, which fielded its own candidate, Alexander Van der Bellen, and by the Jewish community of Vienna, by artists and intellectuals who strongly disapprove of Graf. Efraim Zuroff from the Simon Wiesenthal Center also expressed deep concern over the "well-known ties" Graf has with extreme-right groups.

His opponents consider Graf to be unsuitable for the office because of his rightist leanings and continuing Burschenschaft Olympia membership. The student fraternity, which still practices academic fencing, is alleged to have Neo-Nazi links. In the discussions prior to his election, he condemned National Socialism and anti-Semitism but said he would, in any event, remain a member of the Burschenschaft. Freedom Party leader Heinz-Christian Strache called the election of Graf a "victory for democracy" and emphasized his belief that Graf was a seasoned and "irreproachable parliamentarian".

On 12 February 2009, the Public Prosecutor's office in Vienna asked the parliament to lift his immunity because they wanted to charge him with embezzlement and fraud in connection with his former job as a manager of the Austrian Research Centers. The prosecutor's focus was on Graf's severance payment and the bonus he got when the ARC was in financial difficulties. Graf denies the allegations, calling them "baseless".

In April, Graf hosted the presentation of a book written by his party colleague Andreas Mölzer containing strong criticism of the European Union, in the rooms of the Austrian parliament. The keynote speaker at that event was Walter Marinovic, a former teacher who has links to the hard-right National Democratic Party of Germany and also writes for the Deutsche Nationalzeitung of Gerhard Frey. A deputy of the Green Party protested against Marinovic's invitation.
