= Gudrun Kugler =

Austrian lawyer and politician

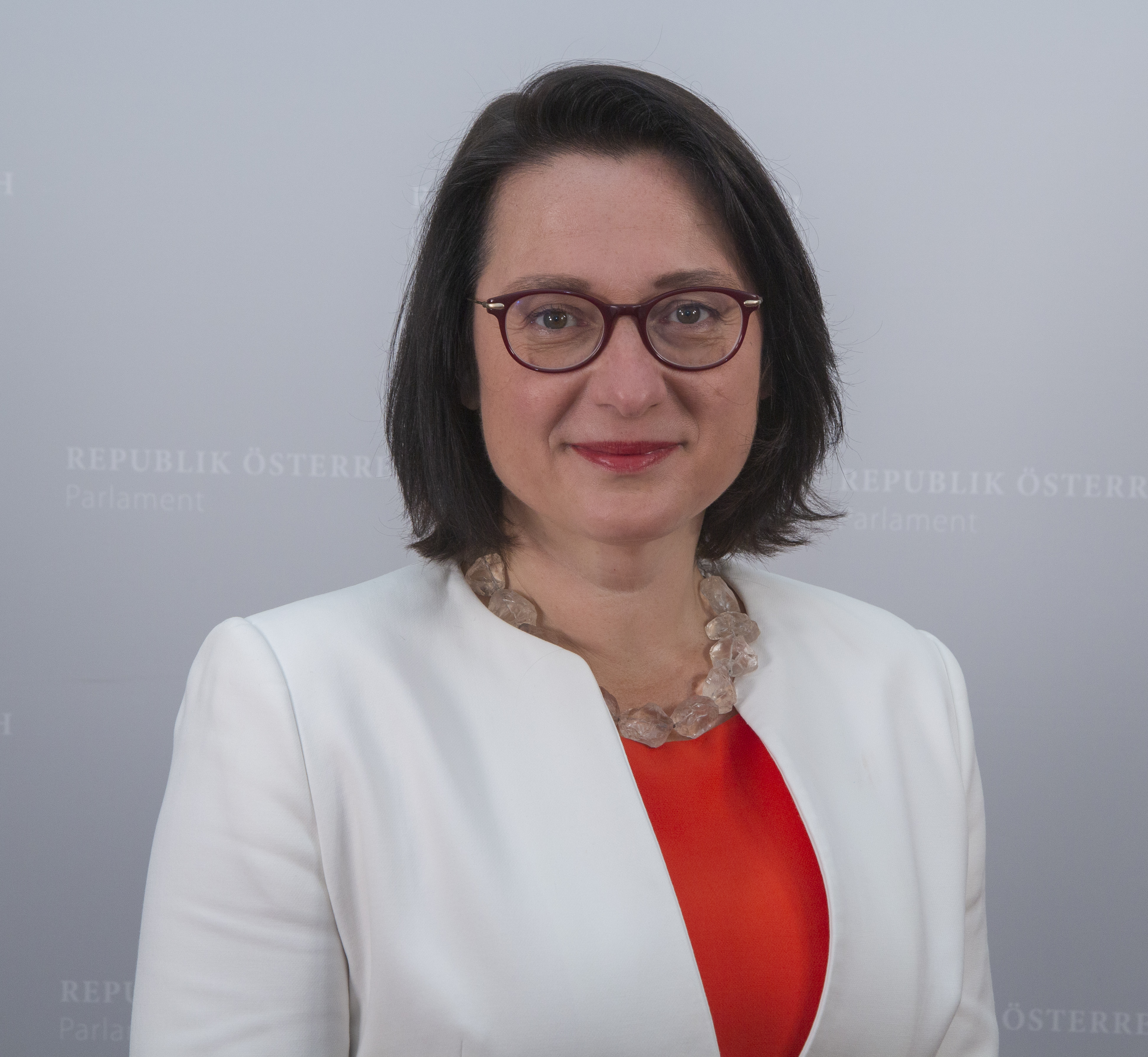

Member of the National Council
- Incumbent
- Assumed office 9 November 2017

Member of the Gemeinderat and Landtag of Vienna
- In office 2015–2017

Personal details
- Born: 12 November 1976 (age 49) Gmunden, Austria
- Citizenship: Austrian
- Party: Austrian People's Party (ÖVP)
- Education: Johannes Kepler University Linz
- Profession: Politician; lawyer
- Website: gudrunkugler.at

Gudrun Veronika Kugler, née Lang, also known as Kugler-Lang (born 12 November 1976, Gmunden, Upper Austria), is an Austrian politician. She is also a Roman Catholic theologian, jurist, and an Austrian People's Party member of Austria's National Council.

Kugler is known for her involvement in the pro-life movement and her work combatting human trafficking, the death penalty, and her efforts in preserving marriage as the union between one man and one woman. Furthermore, she advocates against the discrimination and persecution of Christians and other faith groups in Europe and worldwide.

== Political and business activities ==
Kugler holds master's degrees in law, women's studies, and theology. Her doctorate is in international law. From 2001 to 2004, she worked in Brussels as the first director of the World Youth Alliance-Europe, representing 1.5 million young people from 100 countries at the EU and UN. In January 2005, she and her husband founded Kairos-PR, a consulting company based in Vienna which focuses on charitable initiatives.

In 2005, Kugler ran as an independent candidate for the Austrian People's Party (ÖVP) at the Vienna municipal elections and earned the most votes after the top candidate Johannes Hahn (later Austria's EU Commissioner). In that context, abortion rights advocates and anti-abortion activists accused each other of fundamentalism.

In April 2010, Kugler was elected a member of the Advisory Panel of the Fundamental Rights Platform (a form of co-operation of EU Fundamental Rights Agency with NGOs), for a period of two years.

In 2015, she was elected to the Viennese municipal council for the ÖVP, receiving 1,652 "preference votes" added to ballots by voters by hand.

In October 2017, she surprised political observers when she won a direct seat in the National Council elections in a traditionally social-democratic stronghold in Vienna. Her ticket received the highest increase in votes, more than 9%. Kugler also placed the second in the preference votes of all regional ÖVP candidates in Vienna.

== Activities in Austrian Parliament and OSCE ==
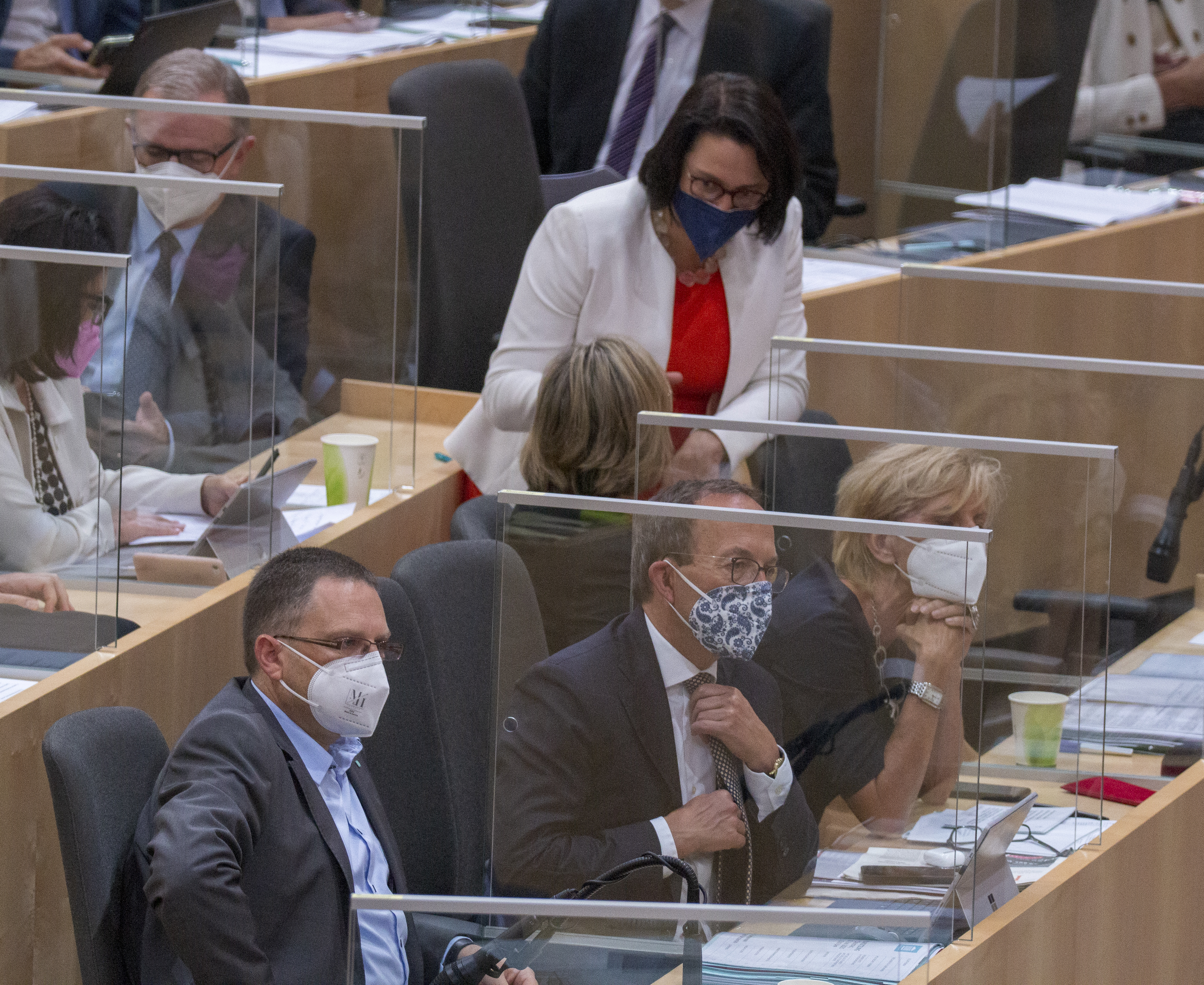
Kugler in the Plenum of the Austrian National Council

Gudrun Kugler has been a member of the Austrian Parliament since 2017. Re-elected in 2019 and 2024, she is now the spokesperson for Human Rights, International Development and Development Cooperation for the ÖVP'S parliamentary group. She is vice-chair of the equality Committee, as well as rapporteur of the Committee on Human Rights and Ombudsman Affairs, and the foreign affairs Committee. Furthermore, she is member of the Austrian Delegation to the Parliamentary Assembly of the OSCE, and chair of the Austrian bi-lateral parliamentary group with Croatia.

She has been Vice-President of the OSCE Parliamentary Assembly since 2024. She is the Special Representative on Demographic Change and Security of the OSCE Parliamentary Assembly and Chairwoman of the EPP and likeminded Groups in the OSCE PA. She served three terms as Rapporteur of the Second Committee from 2021–2024 and is member and former vice-chair of the Ad Hoc Committee on Migration.

As spokesperson for human rights, Gudrun Kugler initiated numerous parliamentary resolutions, such as on the protection of religious minorities, namely Christians, the Muslim minority of Uighurs in China, and the Bahaí in Yemen. She also combated human and organ trafficking, advocated for vulnerable groups in asylum procedures, protecting women against female genital mutilation, human rights in prisons, and human rights in artificial intelligence, and rights for people with disabilities.

Kugler is also known as a vocal critic of China's human rights violations, and for her efforts to strengthen the collaboration between Central- and Eastern European states.

In her Report as Special Representative on Demographic Change and Security for OSCE, she states that demographic decline is a major security challenge, affecting labor markets, welfare systems, social cohesion, and geopolitical stability. Her 2025 report urged stronger support for families and long-term strategies to address ageing and low fertility.

== Positions ==
=== Christian activities ===
She was on the board of directors of World Vision from 2023 to 2025.

Together with other Christian intellectuals, Kugler founded Europe for Christ, an initiative to encourage Christians to be aware of their responsibilities in the political forum. She also established the Observatory on Intolerance and Discrimination against Christians in Europe.

Kugler attended the first meeting of the OSCE Office for Democratic Institutions and Human Rights on "intolerance and discrimination against Christians" as a representative of the Documentation Centre.

Kugler has stated that "intolerance against Christians by negative stereotyping and discrimination by denial of rights are on the rise". Since 2008, Kugler has taught as an adjunct professor at the International Theological Institute in Vienna, Austria. She founded and ran the youth academy of the Dr.-Karl-Kummer-Institute. In 2010, she and Denis Borel edited the book "Entdeckung der Freundschaft" (discovery of friendship) in honor of the 65th Birthday of Cardinal Christoph Schönborn. Together with her husband, Kugler founded the Catholic marriage bureau kathTreff.

In 2019, Kugler held a speech at the event of "Awakening Austria" in which she criticized that marriage had become "something arbitrary." The event was held during the election campaign of ÖVP-chancellor Sebastian Kurz, and received public attention as Ben Fitzgerald (founder of "Awakening Europe") called upon the thousands of attendees to pray for Sebastian Kurz.

=== Socio-political stance ===
Kugler wants registrars in Vienna to be able to refuse the establishment of registered partnerships with reference to their Christian faith if their marriage dates to a point before the Austrian law changed. She was opposed to a prison sentence for the American officer Kim Davis, jailed in 2015 because she refused to issue marriage certificates to homosexual couples, stating it went against her Christian religion. Kugler argues that Davis is a prime example of modern-day persecution of Christians. Kugler further argues that the authentication of same-sex marriage could theoretically lead to marriage among siblings.

== Awards ==
- Leopold Kunschak Prize for Kugler's dissertation.
- Prize awarded by the "Ja zum Leben" Foundation (German: "Yes to life") for her work in Brussels.
- Thomas More Award by the International Catholic Legislators Network (2018).
- Pro Merito Melitensi, bestowed by the Order of Malta.

== Private life ==
Gudrun Kugler is married to Martin Kugler, a historian, head of Kairos Consulting, and former spokesperson of the Austrian branch of the conservative Catholic association Opus Dei, which he left before they married. They have four children.

== Publications ==
=== Monographs ===
- Symposium im Gedenken an die Widerstandsgruppe Weiße Rose zum 60. Todestag von Hans Scholl, Sophie Scholl. Texte zum Symposium im Gedenken an die Widerstandsgruppe "Weisse Rose" zum 60. Todestag von Hans Scholl, Sophie Scholl, Christoph Probst. Texts for the symposium in memory of the resistance group "White Rose" on the 60th anniversary of the death of Hans Scholl, Sophie Scholl, Christoph Probst [Symposium in memory of the resistance group White Rose on the 60th anniversary of the death of Hans Scholl, Sophie Scholl] (in German). München: Verlag für Kultur und Wissenschaft: Edition pro mundis. 2003. ISBN 3-932829-75-1.
- Europa der Grundrechte?: Beiträge zur Grundrechtecharta der Europäischen Union; mit einem Geleitwort des Bundespräsidenten der Republik Österreich (Co-author: Michael Strohmer) [Europe of fundamental rights? Contributions to the Charter of Fundamental Rights of the European Union; with a foreword by the Federal President of the Republic of Austria.] (in German). Bonn: Verlag für Kultur und Wissenschaft. 2003. ISBN 3-932829-61-1.
- Family – Answer to Many Questions. Freiburg: World Youth Alliance. 2004.
- Hat Gott auch einen Plan für mich [Does God also have a plan for me (co-author: Tilman Beller)] (in German). Freiburg: KathTreff.org. 2009.
- Entdeckung der Freundschaft: von Philia bis Facebook (with Denis Borel) [Discovery of friendship: from Philia to Facebook] (in German). Freiburg: Herder. 2010. ISBN 978-3-451-30343-2.

=== Essays and Articles ===
- Das "F-Wort" mit dem langen Bart. In: Wiener Zeitung, February 14, 2006, online.
- There is no right to abortion, Europe for Christ: Letter for Europe 48 (February 2010).
- Intervening at a political debate, Europe for Christ: Letter for Europe 38 (March 2009).
- Successful Christian Arguing, Europe for Christ: Letter for Europe 29 (May 2008).
