= Dialog im Kamptal =

Political platform and discussion meeting

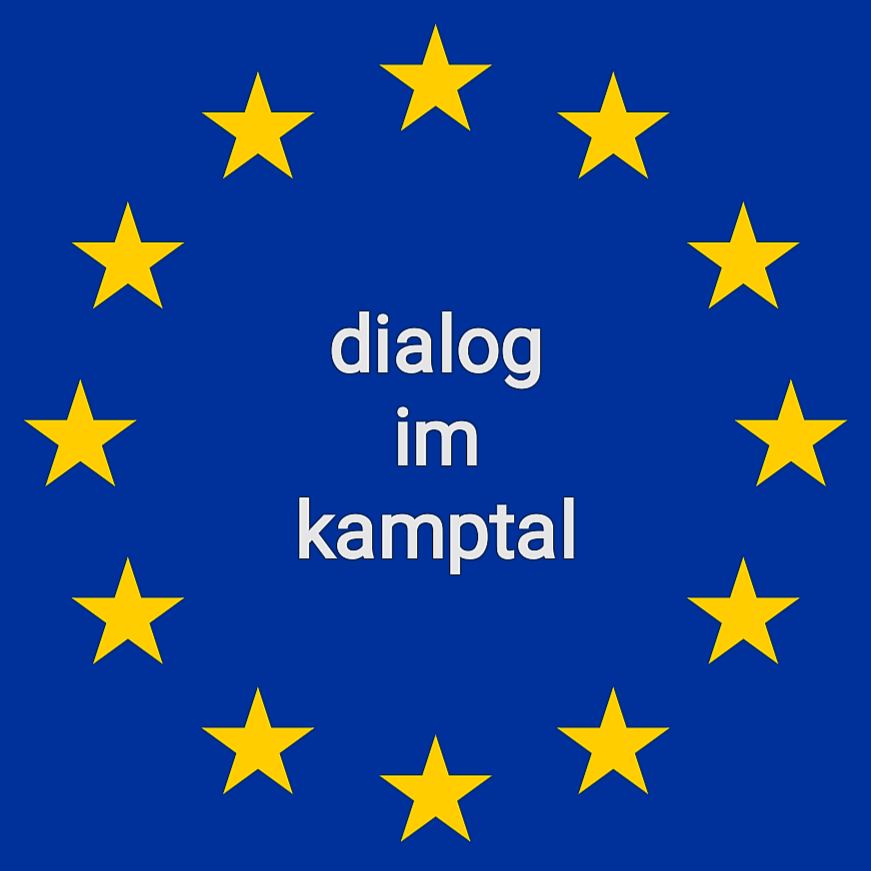

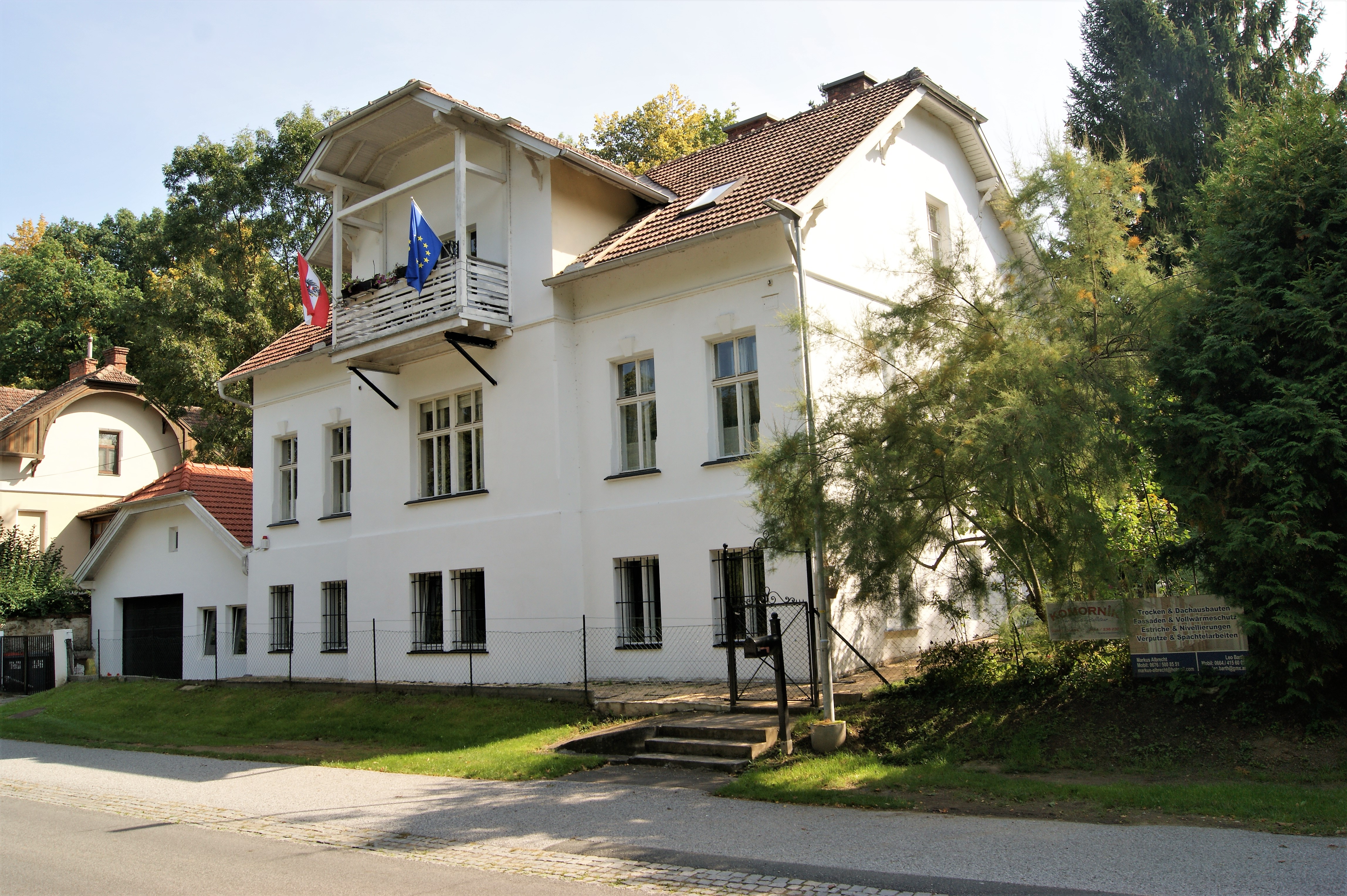
- Art studio Gräff, Gars am Kamp, Austria
- Formation: May 2019; 7 years ago
- Founder: Georgia Kazantzidu and Matthias Laurenz Gräff
- Type: Non-partisan platform
- Legal status: Foundation
- Headquarters: Art studio Gräff/House Kazantzidu in Gars am Kamp, Austria
- Official language: German
- Organisators: Georgia Kazantzidu and Matthias Laurenz Gräff
- Website: www.matthiaslaurenzgraeff.com/dialog-im-kamptal

The Dialog im Kamptal (Dialogue in Kamptal) is a political platform and discussion meeting founded in 2019 in Gars am Kamp, Austria. It is organized as a private, non-partisan initiative and platform based on a purely voluntary basis in the tradition of a "citizens' salon". The dialogues center on European and domestic politics and history.

== History ==
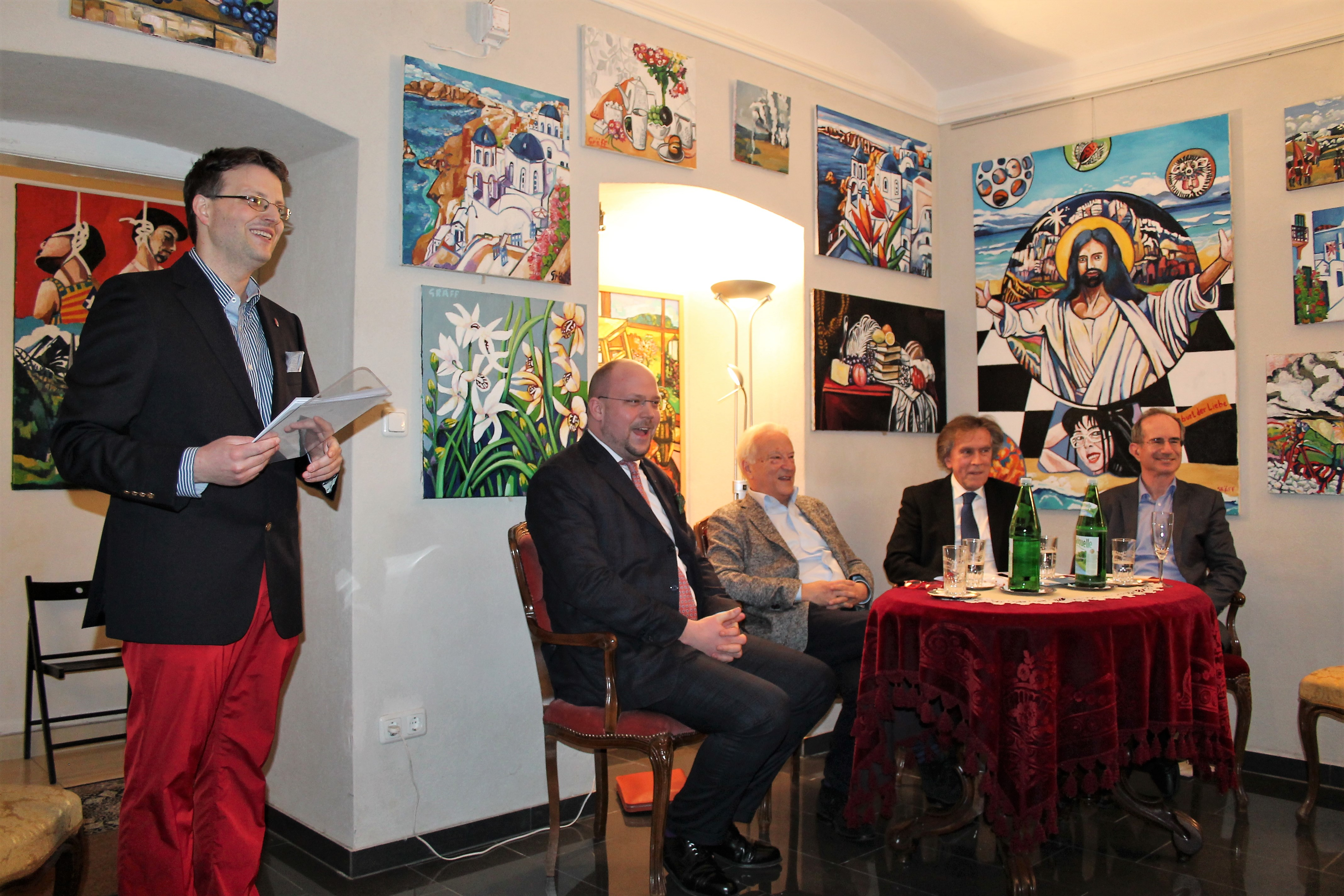
Opening of the Dialogue

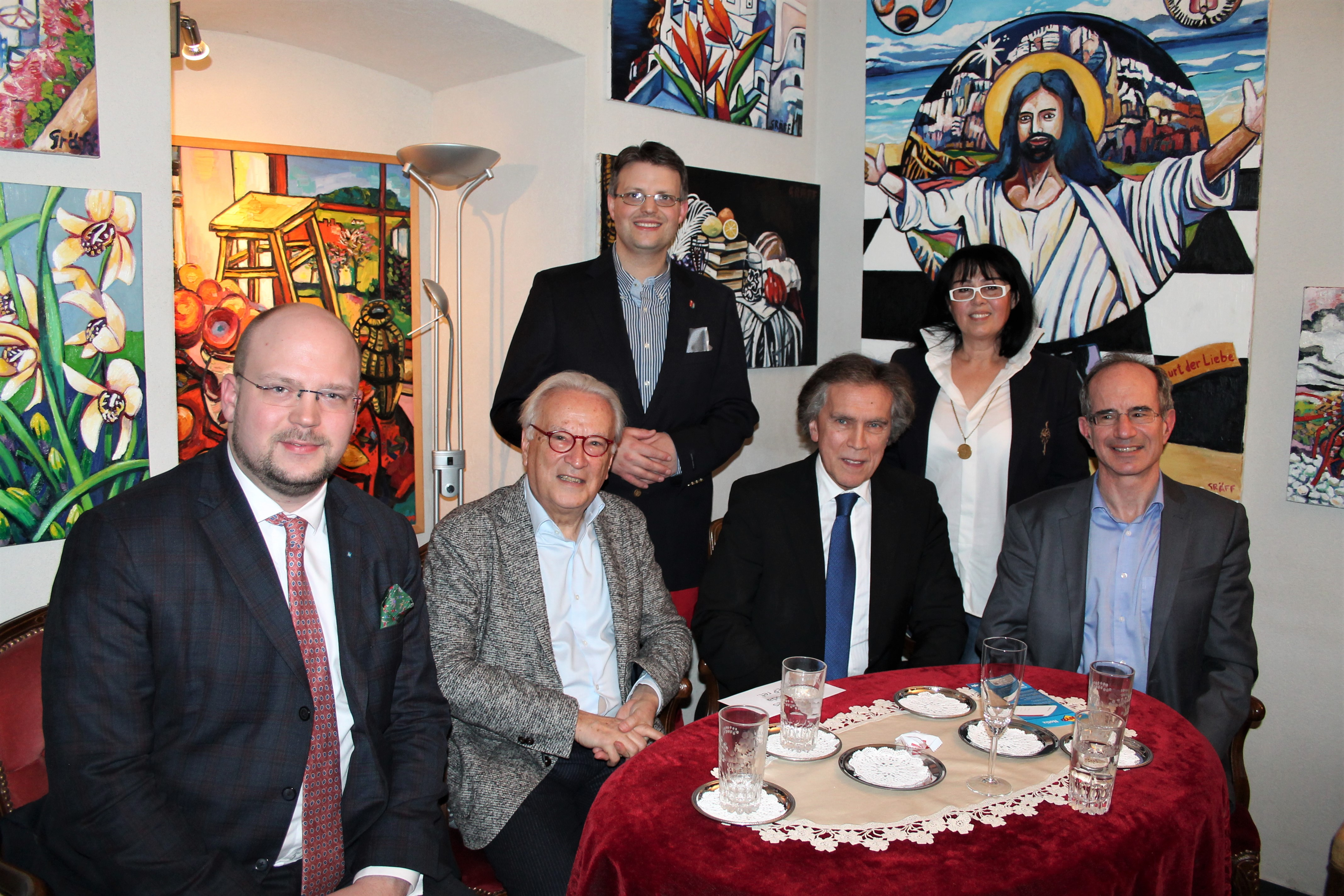
"Dialogue in Kamptal", organizers with discussants (Philipp Jauernik, Hannes Swoboda, Emil Brix, Eric Frey)

The Dialogue in Kamptal was founded by Georgia Kazantzidu and is organized by her and Matthias Laurenz Gräff in the Art studio Gräff/ House Kazantzidu in Gars am Kamp. The location was chosen to demonstrate the importance of Art in Europe politics and society such as the closeness to citizens. For both, the Greek-born Kazantzidu and Gräff, reasons for starting the dialogue are also the common European history, the philosophical and political values since the time of Ancient Greece, humanism and the resulting shared responsibility in society.

The Dialog im Kamptal was launched on the occasion of the European Parliament elections in 2019 to inform citizens about Europe, to increase interest in the European Union, the history, values and tasks of Europe, and to act as a pro European initiator in the Kamptal and Waldviertel region. Subsequently, the platform advanced as a place for information and discourse in politics, diplomacy and intercultural exchange, which tries to explain and promote social issues, as well as a contribution to a better understanding of our society and its diversity, cooperation and exchange.

=== Modus Operandi ===
The events take place without fixed dates, but would like to give a certain continuity with two to three events per year. The dialogues also take place regularly before national and European elections. The participants are candidates or representatives from the participating parties.

At each Dialogue, politicians from opposing parties and diplomats are invited to discuss a topic. Set goals, topics and books of the participants are discussed under the guidance of the moderator. The dialogue ends with the involvement of the audience present, where certain factual issues are discussed with the discussants.

== Dialogues ==
=== 2019 ===
==== Europe dialogue in the Kamptal ====
"It is respect and trust that hold Europe together despite all its diversity. If this Europe is to assert itself, we must move closer together to hold our own against the United States, China and Russia. It is important to have a well-equipped police force and an army, but that must not affect freedom. We must all work together to build a fair and social Europe"

— Wolfgang Petritsch.

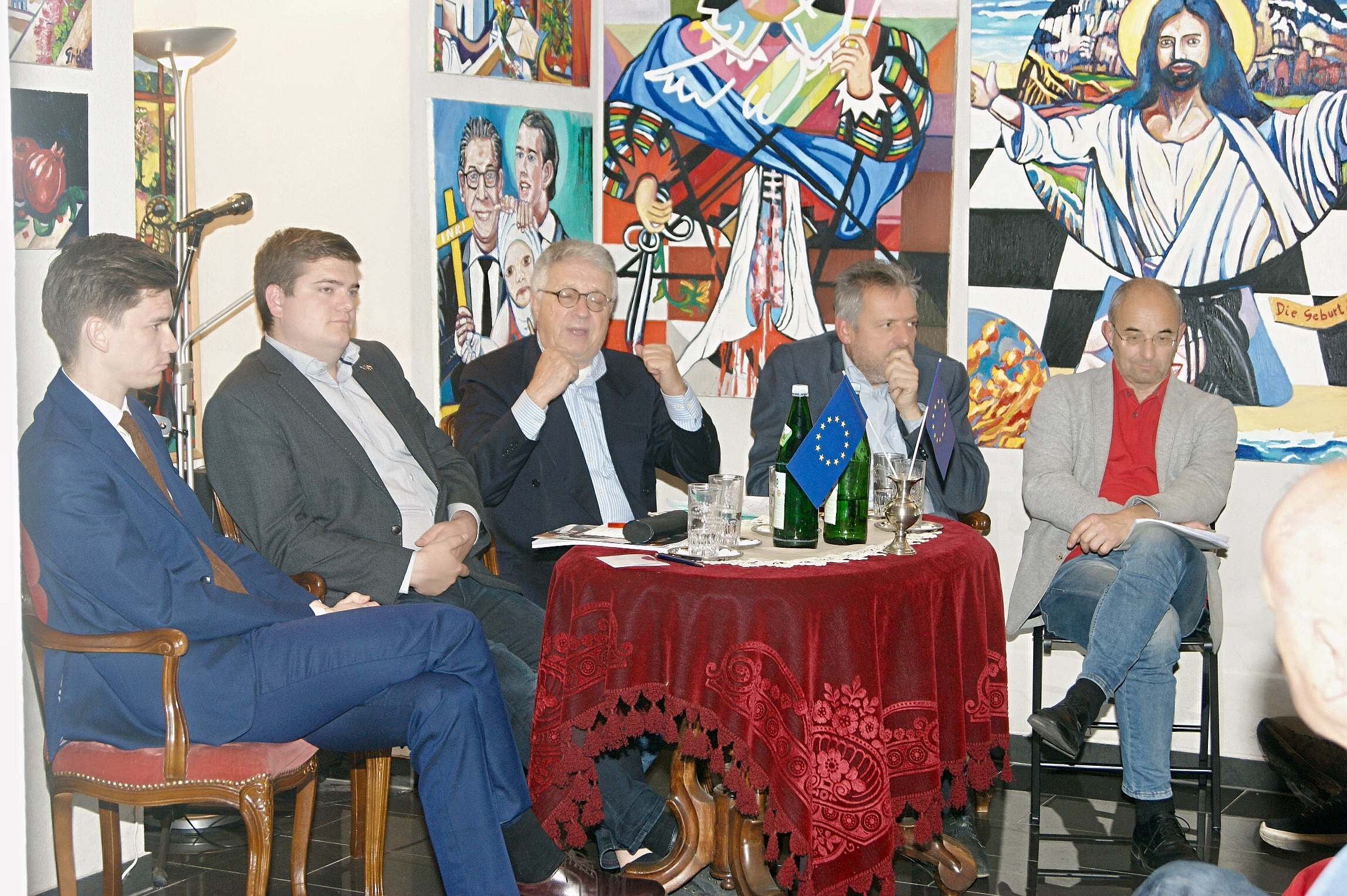
At the podium. Speech of Wolfgang Petritsch (centre)

The first dialogue took place on 6 May, on the occasion of the upcoming elections to the European Parliament. The subject of the European Union is not only topical because of the upcoming European elections, but a common denominator of different parties. The advocating parties do not treat the European idea in an antagonistic or monopolized way, and so they enter into a constructive dialogue.

The European idea of peace and the unification of the people living in Europe, the possible further development and improvements of the bureaucratic system, the economic strength, the need for a higher awareness of the EU and its achievements in the respective member states as well as the importance of the right to vote were the topics dealt with.

The discussion included:

- Wolfgang Petritsch, ambassador, former international High Representative for Bosnia and Herzegovina
- Douglas Hoyos-Trauttmansdorff, member of the National Council of Austria
- Werner Groiß, politician
- Christian Schuh, politician
- Walter Kogler-Strommer, politician
- presenter Josef Wiesinger

Wolfgang Petritsch presented his current book "Epochsenwechsel - Unser digital-autoritäres Jahrhundert" ("Change of Epochs - Our digital-authoritarian century").

==== Dialogue in the Kamptal - bringing politics closer ====
"The technologies will evolve over the next few years. I would like to see closer cooperation between politics and science. Robot operations are already being carried out, autonomous driving is already available in pilot projects in the USA and works without accidents. In some countries, court rulings are sometimes made by computers to some degree of punishment"

— Werner Gruber.

The sequel took place on 10 September, on the occasion of the upcoming 2019 Austrian legislative election with the top candidates from the regional constituency of Waldviertel.

The discussion included: In addition to the top candidates and members of the National Council -

- Martina Diesner-Wais (ÖVP)
- Alois Kainz (FPÖ)
- Martin Litschauer (Die Grünen)
- Günter Steindl (SPÖ)
- Herbert Kolinsky (NEOS)
- the physicist Werner Gruber as a guest of honor on the podium.
- presenter Josef Wiesinger, member of the Landtag of Lower Austria

=== 2020 ===
==== Politics, diplomacy in the 21st century ====
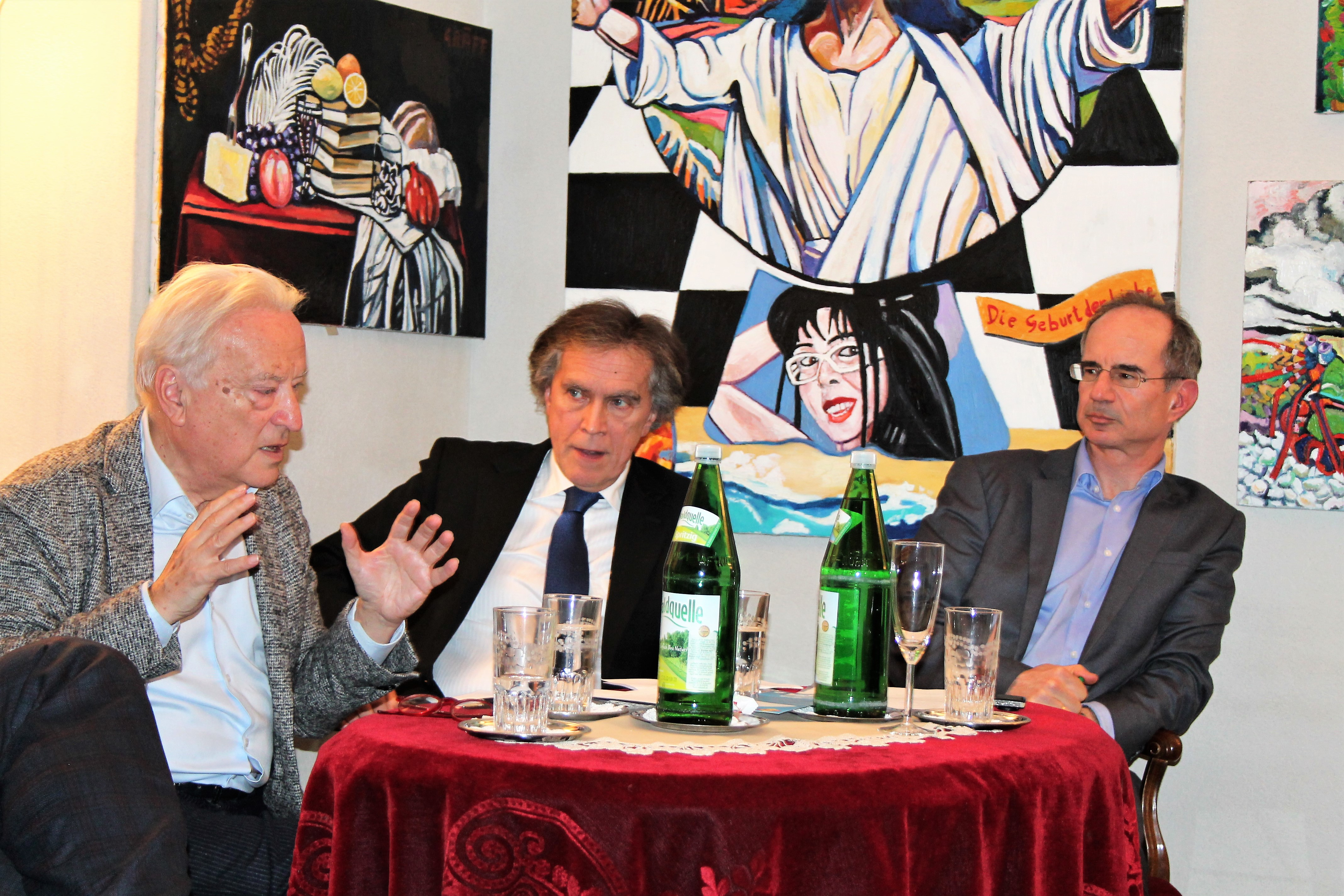
At the podium. Speech of Hannes Swoboda (left)

"I see three main concerns for a lasting peace policy: human rights, resources and climate policy. Here Europe must differ from other powers"

— Hannes Swoboda.

The third dialogue took place on 27 January on the subject of politics, diplomacy and intercultural exchange in the 21st century. The dialogue provide insights into modern developments and challenges in politics, diplomacy and society as well as the importance of intercultural. A main theme of the event was the role of nationalism, which is growing in strength today, as well as its characteristics and disadvantages, especially in the European Union.

The dialogue included:

- Emil Brix, ambassador, director of the Diplomatic Academy of Vienna
- Hannes Swoboda, former president of the group of the Progressive Alliance of Socialists and Democrats in the European Parliament
- Philipp Jauernik, historian and board member from the Pan-European Movement
- presenter Eric Frey from Der Standard.

==== Dialogue of the books - finding what is common ====
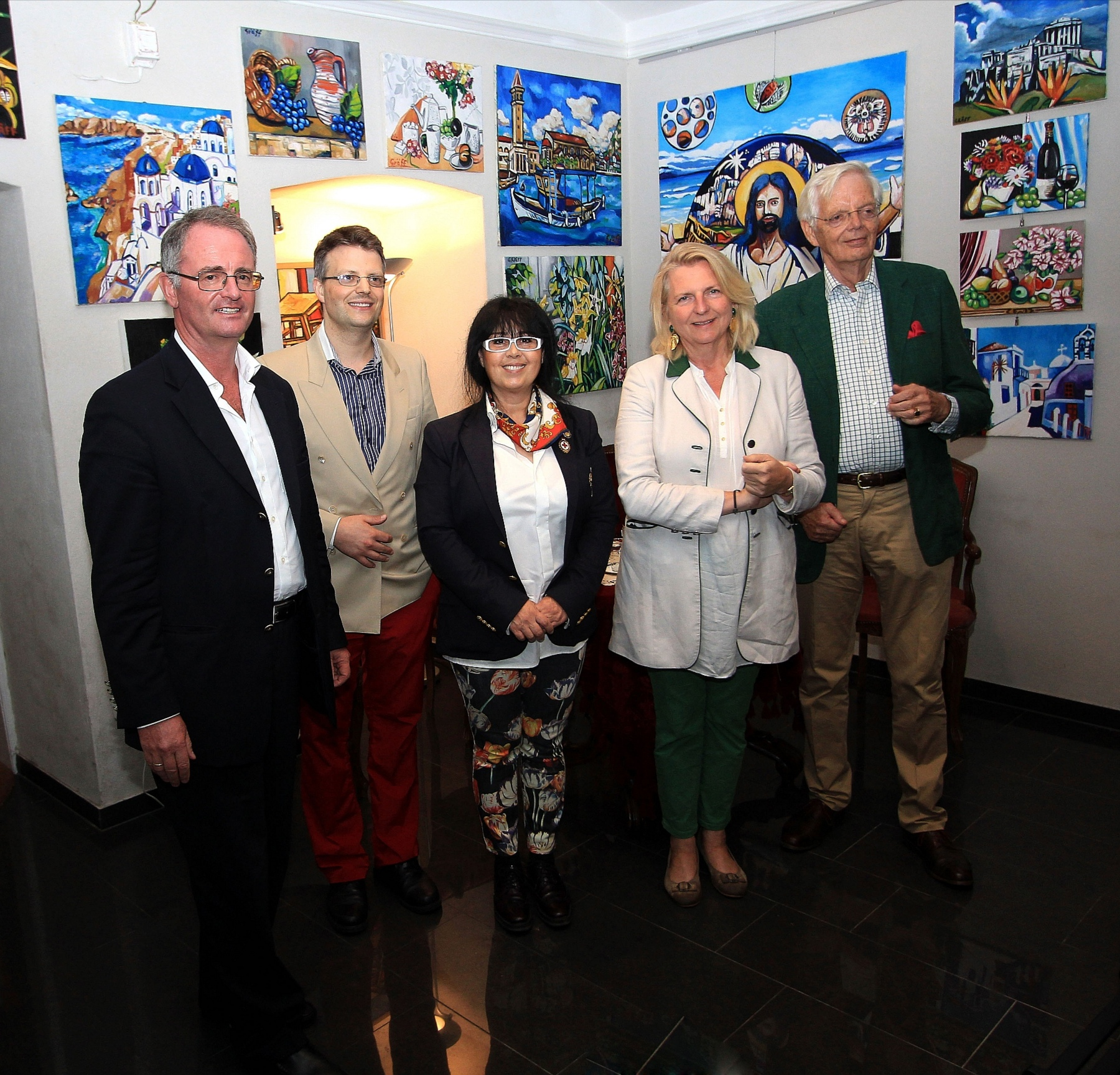
Participants of the Dialogue

"Nations must remain in conversation under all circumstances, negotiations must take place discreetly. Far too much is published in diplomatic negotiations these days. That is one of the reasons for the many stalemates between states"

— Karin Kneissl.

The fourth dialogue took place on 12 September. Thematically, the dialogue spanned the range from the important position, the current development of diplomacy, the problems and new challenges of security policy in connection with globalization and geopolitics to the problems of the use of neo-energies in relation to mobility and environmental protection. A separate topic also presented the tasks and challenges of the high diplomatic service from the past to the present.

The dialogue included:

- Karin Kneissl, former Minister of Foreign Affairs
- Michael Breisky, ambassador
- Georg Vetter, politician
- presenter Georgia Kazantzidu, organizer of the Dialog im Kamptal

The participants presented their books on this topic.

==== Our Europe. Who are we, where are we from and where are we going? ====
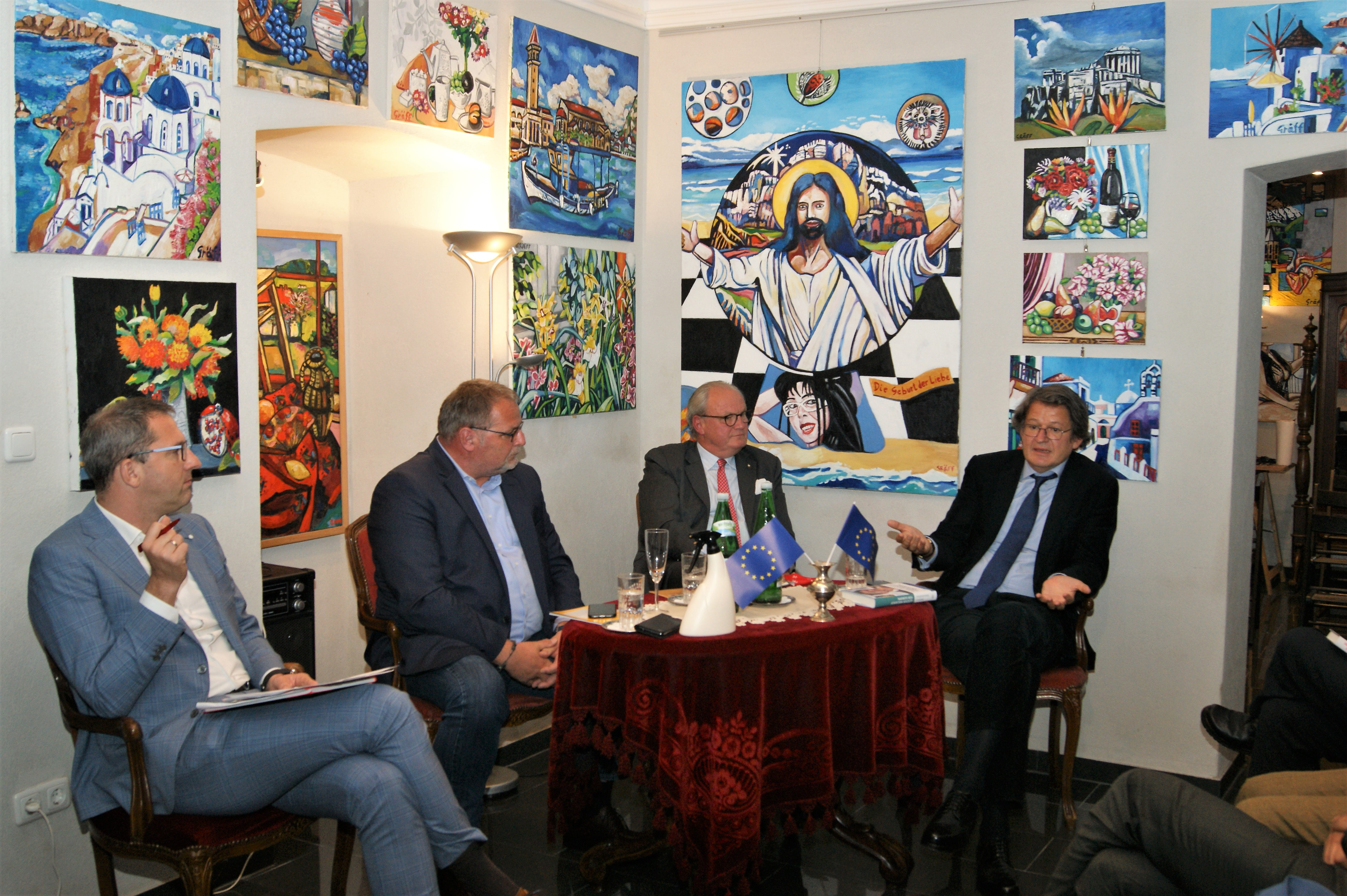
At the podium. Speech of Helmut Brandstätter (right)

"In Europe we are faced with the challenge of maintaining what we have achieved. But we didn't understand what globalization meant. It means mutual responsibility, it requires solidarity. But we wage trade and customs wars. I don't mean to sound pessimistic, but I'm afraid we're facing a third world war.."

— Erhard Busek.

The fifth dialogue took place on 28 September. Topics included the development of Europe, the current COVID-19 crisis, migration and the tight as a business location.

The dialogue included:

- Erhard Busek, former Vice-Chancellor of Austria
- Sebastian Prinz von Schoenaich-Carolath, ambassador
- Helmut Brandstätter, member of the National Council of Austria, former publisher and editor-in-chief of the daily newspaper Kurier
- Willi Mernyi, managing director of the Austrian trade unions, president of the Austrian Mauthausen Committee
- presenter Daniel Lohninger, chief journalist of the NÖN

=== 2021 ===
==== NEOS ====
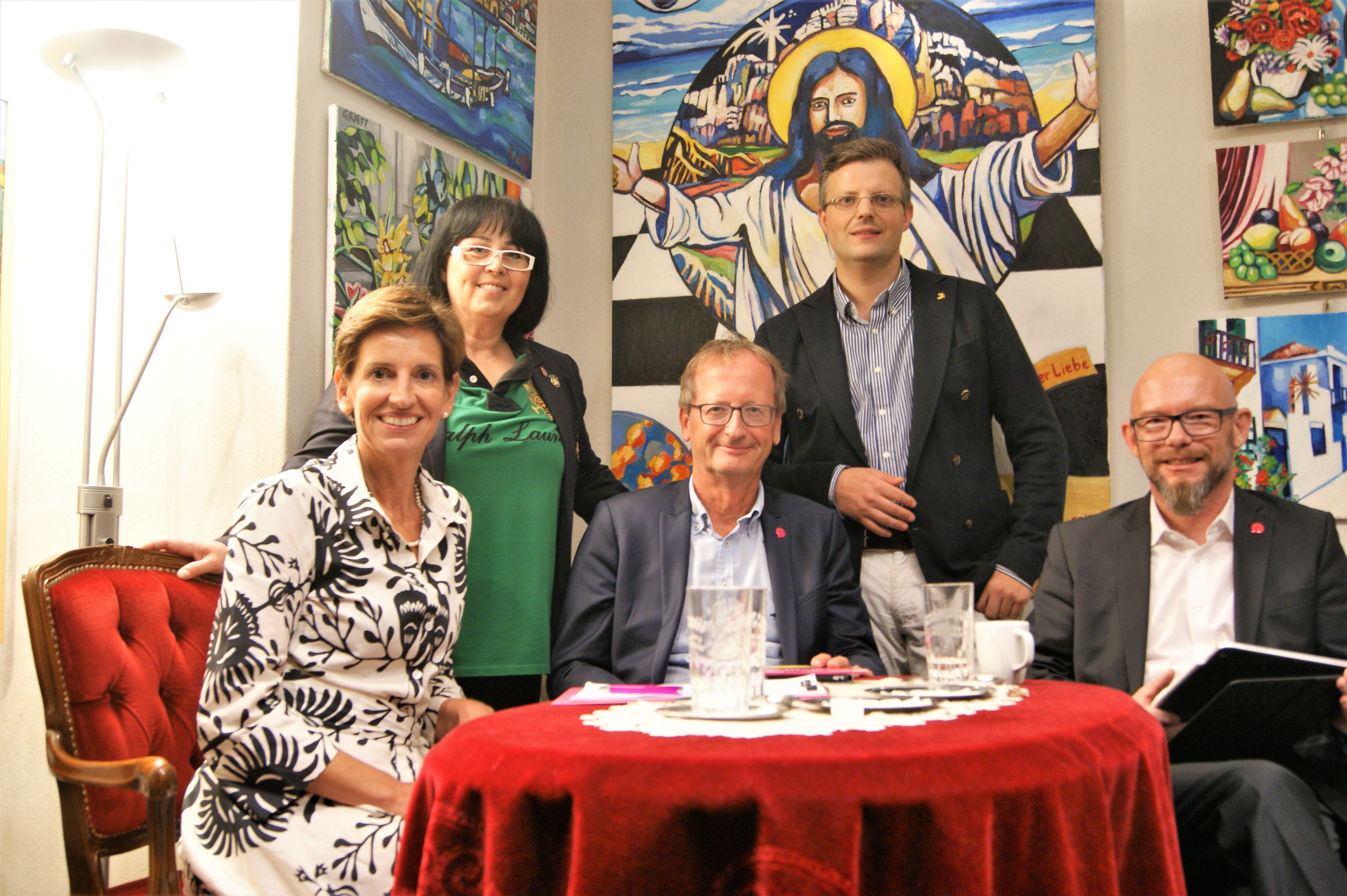
Indra Collini, Georgia Kazantzidu, Helmut Hofer-Gruber, Matthias Laurenz Gräff, Bernd Pinzer

The sixth dialogue took place on 13 September. It was the premiere of the salon "Parties in Conversation". The content was the presentation of NEOS Party in Lower Austria, its content, ideas and goals. These are clean politics, against political and economic corruption, transparency in contracts and equal opportunities in the field of education.

The dialogue included:

- Indra Collini, NEOS Lower Austria spokeswoman and club chairwoman, member of the Landtag of Lower Austria
- Helmut Hofer-Gruber, NEOS member of the Landtag of Lower Austria
- presenter Bernd Pinzer, NEOS club director of Lower Austria

==== Importance of the judiciary and the Austrian constitution ====
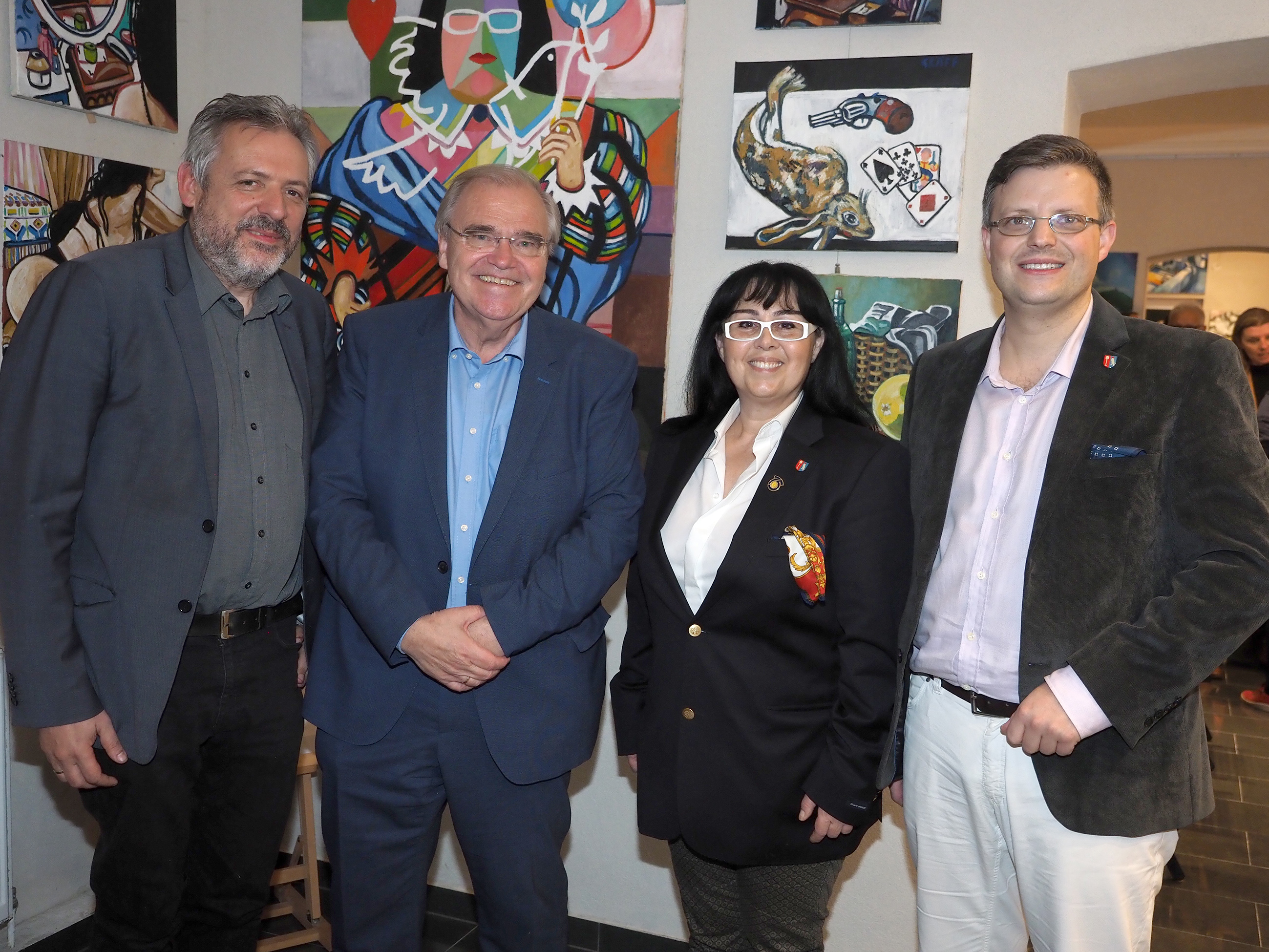
Werner Groiß, Wolfgang Brandstetter, Georgia Kazantzidu, Matthias Laurenz Gräff

"We owe the 101-year-old constitution to the brilliant Hans Kelsen, who anchored the separation of powers between the executive, legislative and judiciary in it."

— Wolfgang Brandstetter.

The seventh dialogue took place on 26 October. The event was originally planned for 2021 on the occasion of "100 Years of the Austrian Federal Constitution", but had to be postponed due to the Corona Pandemic. It was the premiere of the salon "Personalities in conversation". This time the dialogue dealt with the subject of the Austrian judiciary on the occasion of the socio-political topicality as well as under the aspect of "101 Years of the Austrian Federal Constitution". The former Austrian vice chancellor, minister of justice and constitutional judge Wolfgang Brandstetter devoted himself extensively to the independence of the judiciary, the trust and fairness of the Austrian courts and their administration of justice.

The dialogue included:

- Wolfgang Brandstetter, former Vice Chancellor of Austria, Minister of justice, constitutional judge, Professor of Criminal Law and Criminal Procedure Law at the University Vienna
- presenter Werner Groiß

=== 2022 ===
==== Karl von Habsburg - 100 years Paneuropa ====
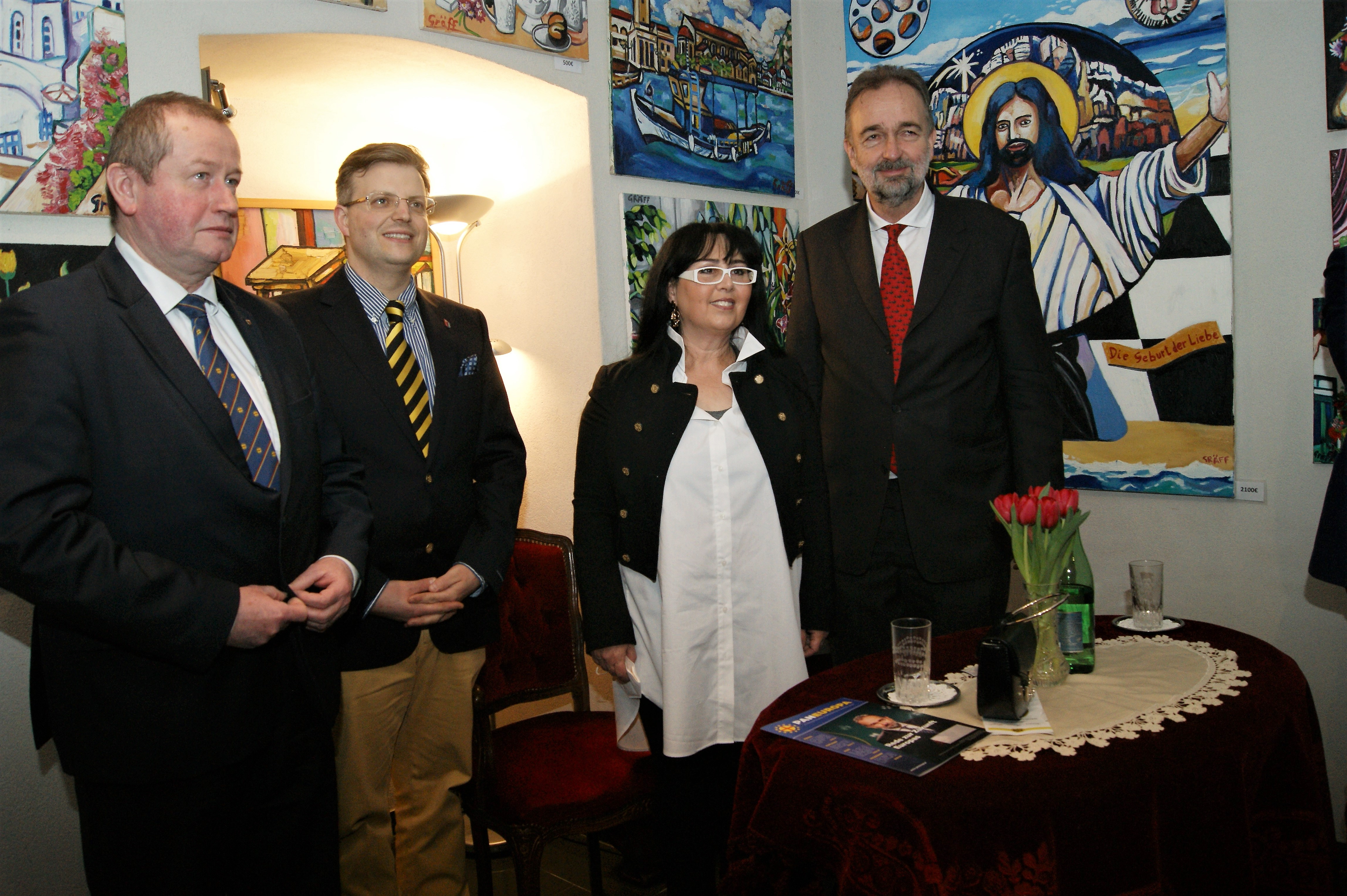
Rainhard Kloucek, Matthias Laurenz Gräff, Georgia Kazantzidu, Karl von Habsburg

Habsburg on neutrality, a rethinking of Austrian neutrality and one in relation to Ukraine in the military conflict with Russia: "Neutrality is not a merit, you get it imposed. And who advises neutrality? Certainly not someone who is your friend, but your opponent. Who advises Ukraine to be neutral"

— Karl von Habsburg.

The eight dialogue took place on 9 March. It was the premiere of the salon "European Cooperation". The speaker at the event was Karl von Habsburg, head of the former Austrian imperial family Habsburg, President of the Paneuropean Movement Austria. The event was moderated by Rainhard Kloucek, Secretary General of the Austrian Paneuropean Movement. The event was held under the following aspects: "100 Years of Paneurope", the oldest European unification movement and the historically grown area of Central Europe. What Paneurope can contribute to European unification and what can be learned from the historical idea of Central Europe. Important geopolitical issues such as current Russian politics and the invasion of Ukraine were also discussed on the podium.

The dialogue included:

- Karl von Habsburg, President of the Pan-European Movement Austria, Vice-President of the Pan-European Union
- Rainhard Kloucek, Secretary General of the Pan-European Movement Austria, Member of the Board of the Paneuropa Union

Karl von Habsburg presented his current book "Karl von Habsburg: Kaiserenkel zwischen den Zeiten" ("Karl von Habsburg: Imperial grandson between the times").

==== Helmut Brandstätter in conversation ====
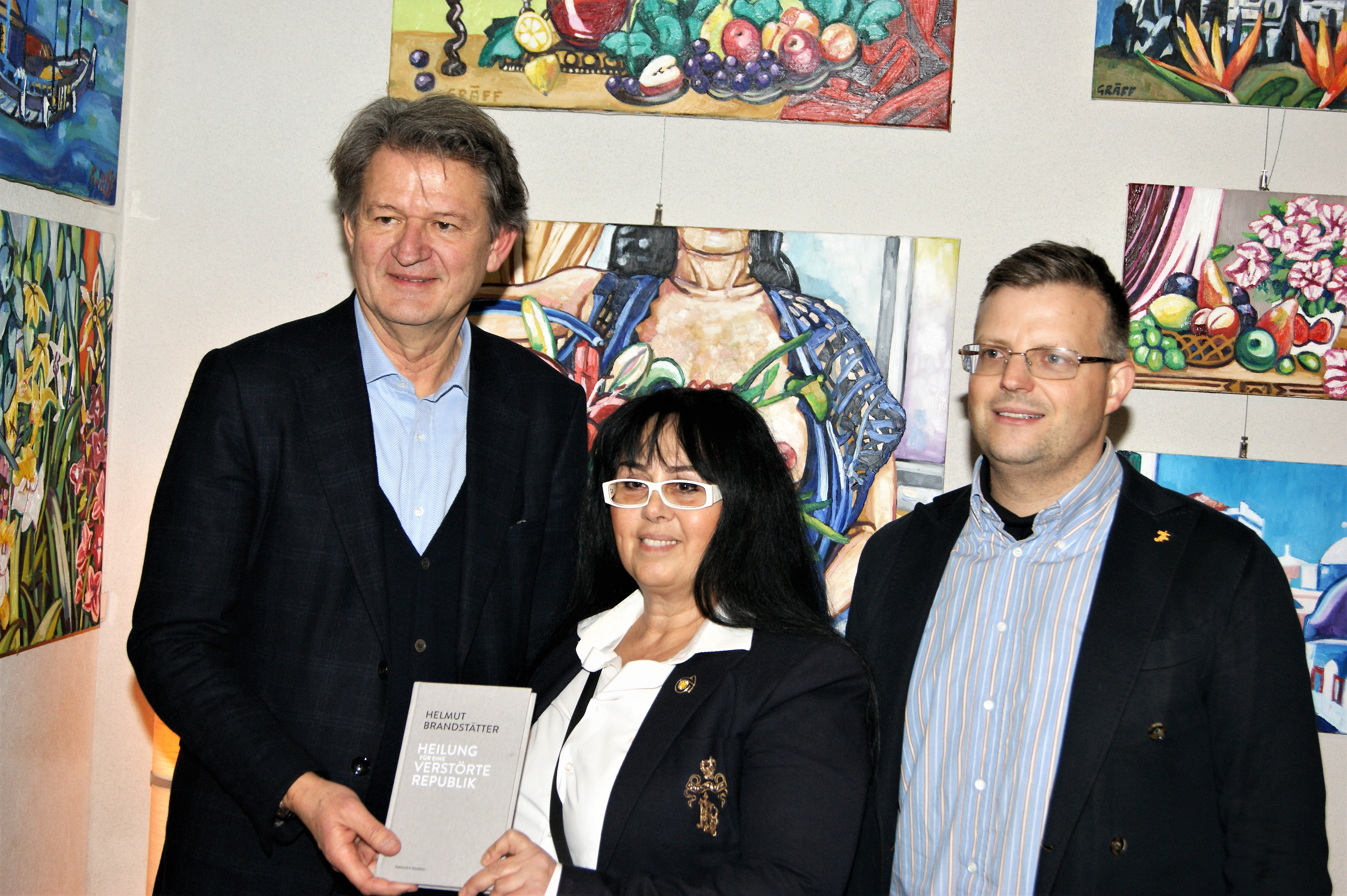
Helmut Brandstätter, Georgia Kazantzidu, Matthias Laurenz Gräff

"Away with the headlines! More honesty must return to politics!”

— Helmut Brandstätter.

The ninth dialogue took place on 19 December. It was the second edition of the salon "Personalities in conversation". Helmut Brandstätter, politician of NEOS and former publisher and editor-in-chief of the daily newspaper Kurier presented his current book "Heilung für eine verstörte Republik", and discussed domestic political problems and possible solutions. As foreign policy spokesman for his party he also devoted a large part of the evening to European politics, the Russian invasion of Ukraine and the question of Austria's role within it, as well as the question of neutrality and security-military discussions.

The dialogue included:

- Helmut Brandstätter, member of the National Council of Austria

=== 2023 ===
==== Lower Austria state election ====
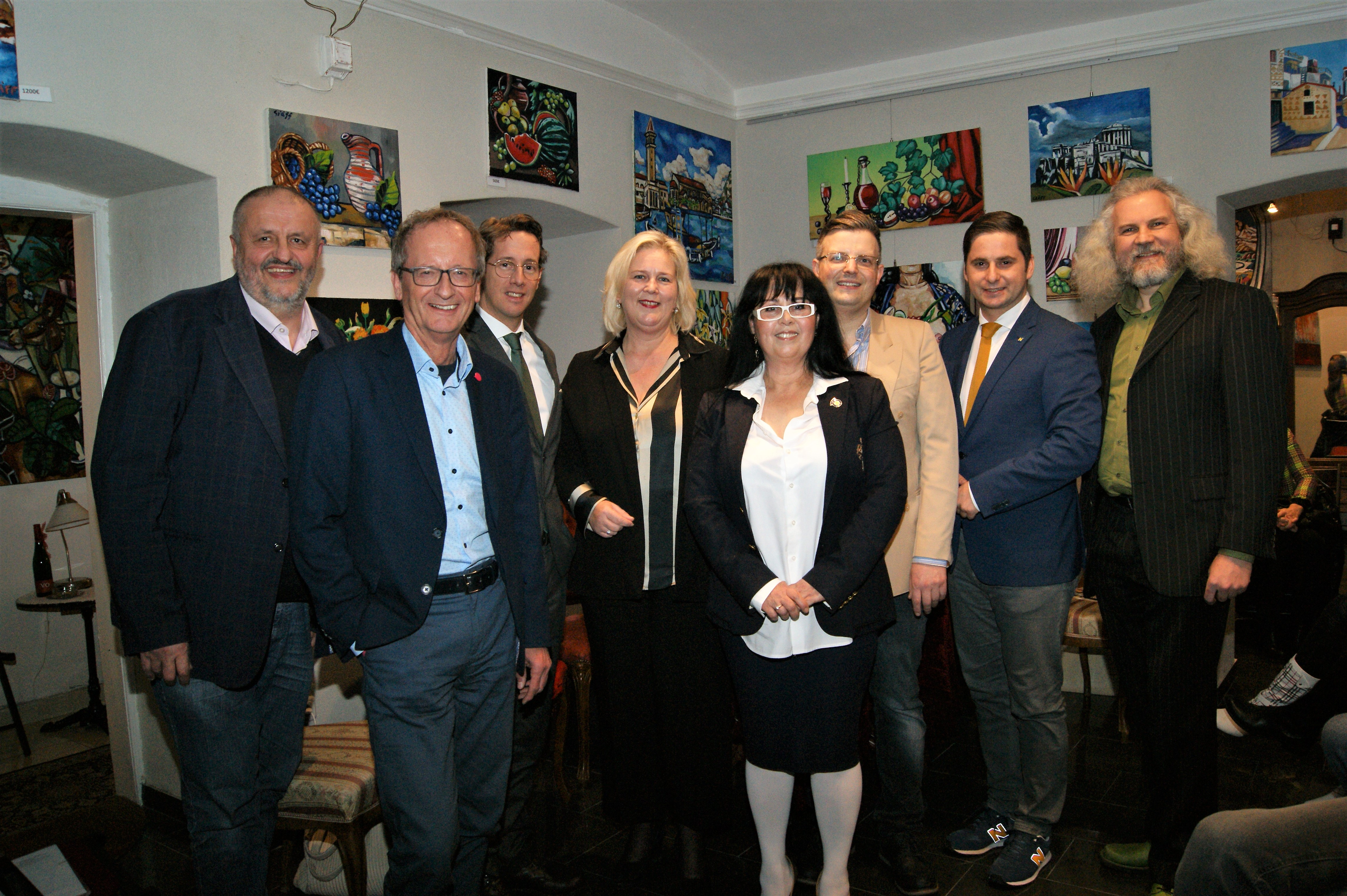
Martin Kalchhauser, Helmut Hofer-Gruber, Reinhard Teufel, Elvira Schmidt, Georgia Kazantzidu, Matthias Laurenz Gräff, Lukas Brandweiner, Martin Litschauer

"Kindergarten should be free for everyone. Education cannot be dependent on parents' income."

— Elvira Schmidt.

The tenth dialogue took place on 19 January, on the occasion of the upcoming elections to the 2023 Lower Austrian state elections. The candidates of the parties represented in the state parliament took part.

The discussion included:

- ÖVP: Lukas Brandweiner, member of the National Council of Austria
- SPÖ: Elvira Schmidt, member of the Landtag of Lower Austria
- FPÖ: Reinhard Teufel, member of the Landtag of Lower Austria
- DIE GRÜNEN: Martin Litschauer, member of the National Council of Austria
- NEOS: Helmut Hofer-Gruber, member of the Landtag of Lower Austria
- presenter: Martin Kalchhauser, journalist of NÖN
