= Waldviertel (National Council electoral district) =

Parliamentary electoral district in Austria

- Electoral District for the National Council
- Location of Waldviertel within Austria
- District: List: Gmünd; Horn; Krems an der Donau City; Krems an der Donau; Waidhofen an der Thaya; Zwettl
- State: Lower Austria
- Population: 215,838 (2024)
- Electorate: 177,574 (2019)
- Area: 4,615 km^{2} (2023)

Current Electoral District
- Created: 1994
- Seats: 5 (1994–present)
- Members: List: Lukas Brandweiner (ÖVP); Martina Diesner-Wais (ÖVP)

Waldviertel, also known as Electoral District 3B (German: Wahlkreis 3B), is one of the 39 multi-member regional electoral districts of the National Council, the lower house of the Austrian Parliament, the national legislature of Austria. The electoral district was created in 1992 when electoral regulations were amended to add regional electoral districts to the existing state-wide electoral districts and came into being at the following legislative election in 1994. It consists of the city of Krems an der Donau and the districts of Gmünd, Horn, Krems an der Donau, Waidhofen an der Thaya and Zwettl in the state of Lower Austria. The electoral district currently elects five of the 183 members of the National Council using the open party-list proportional representation electoral system. At the 2019 legislative election the constituency had 177,574 registered electors.

== History ==
Waldviertel was one 43 regional electoral districts (regionalwahlkreise) established by the "National Council Electoral Regulations 1992" (Nationalrats-Wahlordnung 1992) passed by the National Council in 1992. It consisted of the city of Krems an der Donau and the districts of Gmünd, Horn, Krems an der Donau, Waidhofen an der Thaya and Zwettl in the state of Lower Austria. The district was initially allocated five seats in May 1993.

== Electoral system ==
Waldviertel currently elects five of the 183 members of the National Council using the open party-list proportional representation electoral system. The allocation of seats is carried out in three stages. In the first stage, seats are allocated to parties (lists) at the regional level using a state-wide Hare quota (wahlzahl) (valid votes in the state divided by the number of seats in the state). In the second stage, seats are allocated to parties at the state/provincial level using the state-wide Hare quota (any seats won by the party at the regional stage are subtracted from the party's state seats). In the third and final stage, seats are allocated to parties at the federal/national level using the D'Hondt method (any seats won by the party at the regional and state stages are subtracted from the party's federal seats). Only parties that reach the 4% national threshold, or have won a seat at the regional stage, compete for seats at the state and federal stages.

Electors may cast one preferential vote for individual candidates at the regional, state and federal levels. Split-ticket voting (panachage), or voting for more than one candidate at each level, is not permitted and will result in the ballot paper being invalidated. At the regional level, candidates must receive preferential votes amounting to at least 14% of the valid votes cast for their party to over-ride the order of the party list (10% and 7% respectively for the state and federal levels). Prior to April 2013 electors could not cast preferential votes at the federal level and the thresholds candidates needed to over-ride the party list order were higher at the regional level (half the Hare quota or 1/6 of the party votes) and state level (Hare quota).

== Election results ==
=== Summary ===
Election	Communists KPÖ+ / KPÖ			Social Democrats SPÖ			Greens GRÜNE			NEOS NEOS / LiF			People's ÖVP			Freedom FPÖ		
Election	Votes	%	Seats	Votes	%	Seats	Votes	%	Seats	Votes	%	Seats	Votes	%	Seats	Votes	%	Seats
2019	596	0.42%	0	23,217	16.28%	0	12,211	8.56%	0	8,926	6.26%	0	72,307	50.70%	2	22,976	16.11%	0
2017	664	0.44%	0	30,829	20.51%	1	3,412	2.27%	0	6,036	4.02%	0	63,820	42.46%	2	38,849	25.85%	1
2013	1,016	0.70%	0	35,295	24.19%	1	11,339	7.77%	0	4,817	3.30%	0	58,886	40.36%	2	24,284	16.64%	0
2008	932	0.62%	0	39,802	26.39%	1	9,425	6.25%	0	1,667	1.11%	0	64,012	42.45%	2	23,007	15.26%	0
2006	970	0.66%	0	45,282	30.61%	1	10,217	6.91%	0				72,561	49.05%	2	11,797	7.97%	0
2002	667	0.44%	0	45,840	30.33%	1	7,895	5.22%	0	963	0.64%	0	85,937	56.85%	3	9,851	6.52%	0
1999	460	0.32%	0	41,794	28.79%	1	6,841	4.71%	0	2,733	1.88%	0	60,613	41.75%	2	30,701	21.15%	1
1995	342	0.23%	0	48,714	32.70%	1	4,403	2.96%	0	5,462	3.67%	0	63,207	42.43%	2	25,233	16.94%	0
1994	313	0.21%	0	43,238	29.67%	1	6,433	4.41%	0	6,060	4.16%	0	62,805	43.10%	2	25,179	17.28%	0

=== Detailed ===
==== 2010s ====
===== 2019 =====
Results of the 2019 legislative election held on 29 September 2019:

Party		Votes per district							Total votes	%	Seats
Party		Gmünd	Horn	Krems an der Donau City	Krems an der Donau	Waid- hofen an der Thaya	Zwettl	Voting card	Total votes	%	Seats
Austrian People's Party	ÖVP	11,106	11,382	5,263	18,692	9,072	16,623	169	72,307	50.70%	2
Social Democratic Party of Austria	SPÖ	5,552	2,959	2,850	6,051	2,422	3,305	78	23,217	16.28%	0
Freedom Party of Austria	FPÖ	3,789	3,099	2,014	5,980	3,175	4,852	67	22,976	16.11%	0
The Greens	GRÜNE	1,607	1,625	1,853	3,793	1,249	1,928	156	12,211	8.56%	0
NEOS	NEOS	1,182	1,180	1,127	2,789	909	1,660	79	8,926	6.26%	0
JETZT	JETZT	308	236	249	497	224	283	27	1,824	1.28%	0
KPÖ Plus	KPÖ+	88	66	105	154	87	93	3	596	0.42%	0
Der Wandel	WANDL	88	81	70	145	74	89	4	551	0.39%	0
Valid Votes		23,720	20,628	13,531	38,101	17,212	28,833	583	142,608	100.00%	2
Rejected Votes		487	336	172	668	330	579	6	2,578	1.78%	
Total Polled		24,207	20,964	13,703	38,769	17,542	29,412	589	145,186	81.76%	
Registered Electors		30,485	25,601	18,070	46,078	21,927	35,413		177,574		
Turnout		79.41%	81.89%	75.83%	84.14%	80.00%	83.05%		81.76%		

The following candidates were elected:

- Party mandates - Lukas Brandweiner (ÖVP), 3,491 votes; and Martina Diesner-Wais (ÖVP), 6,472 votes.

===== 2017 =====
Results of the 2017 legislative election held on 15 October 2017:

Party		Votes per district							Total votes	%	Seats
Party		Gmünd	Horn	Krems an der Donau City	Krems an der Donau	Waid- hofen an der Thaya	Zwettl	Voting card	Total votes	%	Seats
Austrian People's Party	ÖVP	9,406	10,332	4,648	16,267	7,987	14,992	188	63,820	42.46%	2
Freedom Party of Austria	FPÖ	6,681	5,361	3,500	10,000	5,294	7,880	133	38,849	25.85%	1
Social Democratic Party of Austria	SPÖ	6,743	3,794	4,236	8,173	3,195	4,541	147	30,829	20.51%	1
NEOS	NEOS	806	872	750	1,864	615	1,066	63	6,036	4.02%	0
Peter Pilz List	PILZ	680	592	665	1,407	515	656	80	4,595	3.06%	0
The Greens	GRÜNE	458	430	460	1,051	364	598	51	3,412	2.27%	0
My Vote Counts!	GILT	240	256	169	455	167	276	12	1,575	1.05%	0
Communist Party of Austria	KPÖ	98	75	129	180	76	92	14	664	0.44%	0
The Whites	WEIßE	50	26	17	90	39	51	0	273	0.18%	0
Free List Austria	FLÖ	56	27	13	55	38	48	0	237	0.16%	0
Valid Votes		25,218	21,765	14,587	39,542	18,290	30,200	688	150,290	100.00%	4
Rejected Votes		428	315	178	579	316	499	4	2,319	1.52%	
Total Polled		25,646	22,080	14,765	40,121	18,606	30,699	692	152,609	85.28%	
Registered Electors		30,884	25,788	18,158	46,201	22,156	35,771		178,958		
Turnout		83.04%	85.62%	81.31%	86.84%	83.98%	85.82%		85.28%		

The following candidates were elected:

- Personal mandates - Martina Diesner-Wais (ÖVP), 8,967 votes.
- Party mandates - Konrad Antoni (SPÖ), 1,752 votes; Angela Fichtinger (ÖVP), 4,371 votes; and Walter Rosenkranz (FPÖ), 3,279 votes.

Substitutions:

- Angela Fichtinger (ÖVP) resigned on 11 June 2019 and was replaced by Lukas Brandweiner (ÖVP) on 12 June 2019.
- Walter Rosenkranz (FPÖ) resigned on 30 June 2019 and was replaced by Alois Kainz (FPÖ) on 1 July 2019.

===== 2013 =====
Results of the 2013 legislative election held on 29 September 2013:

Party		Votes per district							Total votes	%	Seats
Party		Gmünd	Horn	Krems an der Donau City	Krems an der Donau	Waid- hofen an der Thaya	Zwettl	Voting card	Total votes	%	Seats
Austrian People's Party	ÖVP	8,904	9,734	3,504	14,219	7,611	14,794	120	58,886	40.36%	2
Social Democratic Party of Austria	SPÖ	8,288	4,584	4,197	9,051	3,848	5,245	82	35,295	24.19%	1
Freedom Party of Austria	FPÖ	3,927	3,223	2,629	6,398	3,198	4,837	72	24,284	16.64%	0
The Greens	GRÜNE	1,501	1,560	1,648	3,378	1,244	1,895	113	11,339	7.77%	0
Team Stronach	FRANK	1,129	829	559	1,541	825	1,118	20	6,021	4.13%	0
NEOS	NEOS	582	680	668	1,523	467	841	56	4,817	3.30%	0
Alliance for the Future of Austria	BZÖ	513	498	366	979	382	639	19	3,396	2.33%	0
Pirate Party of Austria	PIRAT	141	103	90	260	97	162	6	859	0.59%	0
Communist Party of Austria	KPÖ	168	98	225	268	104	147	6	1,016	0.70%	0
Valid Votes		25,153	21,309	13,886	37,617	17,776	29,678	494	145,913	100.00%	3
Rejected Votes		701	537	261	997	508	896	9	3,909	2.61%	
Total Polled		25,854	21,846	14,147	38,614	18,284	30,574	503	149,822	82.61%	
Registered Electors		31,677	26,065	18,604	45,978	22,675	36,353		181,352		
Turnout		81.62%	83.81%	76.04%	83.98%	80.64%	84.10%		82.61%		

The following candidates were elected:

- Personal mandates - Martina Diesner-Wais (ÖVP), 8,902 votes.
- Party mandates - Konrad Antoni (SPÖ), 2,386 votes; and Angela Fichtinger (ÖVP), 7,123 votes. (Note: ÖVP: 2nd placed candidate Werner Groiß was elected in Lower Austria.)

==== 2000s ====
===== 2008 =====
Results of the 2008 legislative election held on 28 September 2008:

Party		Votes per district							Total votes	%	Seats
Party		Gmünd	Horn	Krems an der Donau City	Krems an der Donau	Waid- hofen an der Thaya	Zwettl	Voting card	Total votes	%	Seats
Austrian People's Party	ÖVP	9,320	10,519	4,018	15,531	8,491	15,690	443	64,012	42.45%	2
Social Democratic Party of Austria	SPÖ	9,627	5,183	4,600	9,865	4,439	5,810	278	39,802	26.39%	1
Freedom Party of Austria	FPÖ	3,745	2,800	2,541	6,083	3,030	4,557	251	23,007	15.26%	0
The Greens	GRÜNE	1,308	1,319	1,401	2,554	1,051	1,574	218	9,425	6.25%	0
Alliance for the Future of Austria	BZÖ	1,450	1,123	847	2,207	935	1,790	86	8,438	5.60%	0
Fritz Dinkhauser List – Citizens' Forum Tyrol	FRITZ	226	234	209	581	191	363	24	1,828	1.21%	0
Liberal Forum	LiF	208	222	299	496	159	244	39	1,667	1.11%	0
Independent Citizens' Initiative Save Austria	RETTÖ	134	129	106	287	110	199	18	983	0.65%	0
Communist Party of Austria	KPÖ	169	82	217	224	106	120	14	932	0.62%	0
The Christians	DC	137	101	61	134	75	189	9	706	0.47%	0
Valid Votes		26,324	21,712	14,299	37,962	18,587	30,536	1,380	150,800	100.00%	3
Rejected Votes		863	575	323	1,105	614	1,105	22	4,607	2.96%	
Total Polled		27,187	22,287	14,622	39,067	19,201	31,641	1,402	155,407	85.64%	
Registered Electors		32,129	26,056	18,700	45,078	22,900	36,603		181,466		
Turnout		84.62%	85.54%	78.19%	86.67%	83.85%	86.44%		85.64%		

The following candidates were elected:

- Party mandates - Erwin Hornek (ÖVP), 4,321 votes; Ewald Sacher (SPÖ), 2,948 votes; and Günter Stummvoll (ÖVP), 5,089 votes.

===== 2006 =====
Results of the 2006 legislative election held on 1 October 2006:

Party		Votes per district							Total votes	%	Seats
Party		Gmünd	Horn	Krems an der Donau City	Krems an der Donau	Waid- hofen an der Thaya	Zwettl	Voting card	Total votes	%	Seats
Austrian People's Party	ÖVP	10,189	11,443	4,620	17,374	9,296	17,344	2,295	72,561	49.05%	2
Social Democratic Party of Austria	SPÖ	10,850	5,737	5,139	10,749	5,023	6,570	1,214	45,282	30.61%	1
Freedom Party of Austria	FPÖ	1,761	1,349	1,460	3,050	1,402	2,357	418	11,797	7.97%	0
The Greens	GRÜNE	1,240	1,328	1,549	2,499	1,006	1,632	963	10,217	6.91%	0
Hans-Peter Martin's List	MATIN	669	512	431	988	490	718	139	3,947	2.67%	0
Alliance for the Future of Austria	BZÖ	567	379	337	820	392	560	116	3,171	2.14%	0
Communist Party of Austria	KPÖ	147	109	168	213	125	167	41	970	0.66%	0
Valid Votes		25,423	20,857	13,704	35,693	17,734	29,348	5,186	147,945	100.00%	3
Rejected Votes		773	526	303	891	544	906	57	4,000	2.63%	
Total Polled		26,196	21,383	14,007	36,584	18,278	30,254	5,243	151,945	86.63%	
Registered Electors		31,348	25,123	18,168	43,196	22,117	35,440		175,392		
Turnout		83.57%	85.11%	77.10%	84.69%	82.64%	85.37%		86.63%		

The following candidates were elected:

- Party mandates - Erwin Hornek (ÖVP), 6,717 votes; Rudolf Parnigoni (SPÖ), 3,545 votes; and Günter Stummvoll (ÖVP), 7,224 votes.

===== 2002 =====
Results of the 2002 legislative election held on 24 November 2002:

Party		Votes per district							Total votes	%	Seats
Party		Gmünd	Horn	Krems an der Donau City	Krems an der Donau	Waid- hofen an der Thaya	Zwettl	Voting card	Total votes	%	Seats
Austrian People's Party	ÖVP	12,393	13,067	6,348	20,590	11,117	20,148	2,274	85,937	56.85%	3
Social Democratic Party of Austria	SPÖ	11,244	5,689	5,513	10,725	5,039	6,517	1,113	45,840	30.33%	1
Freedom Party of Austria	FPÖ	1,645	1,234	1,124	2,344	1,360	1,872	272	9,851	6.52%	0
The Greens	GRÜNE	1,030	997	1,255	1,897	775	1,148	793	7,895	5.22%	0
Liberal Forum	LiF	140	129	132	237	124	135	66	963	0.64%	0
Communist Party of Austria	KPÖ	114	67	133	148	74	115	16	667	0.44%	0
Valid Votes		26,566	21,183	14,505	35,941	18,489	29,935	4,534	151,153	100.00%	4
Rejected Votes		648	367	231	677	402	620	37	2,982	1.93%	
Total Polled		27,214	21,550	14,736	36,618	18,891	30,555	4,571	154,135	89.50%	
Registered Electors		31,237	24,700	17,875	41,927	21,909	34,566		172,214		
Turnout		87.12%	87.25%	82.44%	87.34%	86.22%	88.40%		89.50%		

The following candidates were elected:

- Party mandates - Anna Höllerer (ÖVP), 1,404 votes; Erwin Hornek (ÖVP), 3,217 votes; Rudolf Parnigoni (SPÖ), 3,712 votes; and Günter Stummvoll (ÖVP), 7,869 votes.

==== 1990s ====
===== 1999 =====
Results of the 1999 legislative election held on 3 October 1999:

Party		Votes per district							Total votes	%	Seats
Party		Gmünd	Horn	Krems an der Donau City	Krems an der Donau	Waid- hofen an der Thaya	Zwettl	Voting card	Total votes	%	Seats
Austrian People's Party	ÖVP	8,694	9,779	3,697	13,880	8,040	14,887	1,636	60,613	41.75%	2
Social Democratic Party of Austria	SPÖ	9,941	5,104	4,763	9,760	4,708	6,290	1,228	41,794	28.79%	1
Freedom Party of Austria	FPÖ	5,164	3,982	3,528	7,642	3,764	5,750	871	30,701	21.15%	1
The Greens	GRÜNE	987	844	983	1,652	743	1,131	501	6,841	4.71%	0
Liberal Forum	LiF	352	300	470	709	245	344	313	2,733	1.88%	0
The Independents	DU	235	160	210	368	155	205	34	1,367	0.94%	0
No to NATO and EU – Neutral Austria Citizens' Initiative	NEIN	150	69	61	128	86	155	13	662	0.46%	0
Communist Party of Austria	KPÖ	68	45	113	100	46	70	18	460	0.32%	0
Valid Votes		25,591	20,283	13,825	34,239	17,787	28,832	4,614	145,171	100.00%	4
Rejected Votes		692	472	247	740	453	737	40	3,381	2.28%	
Total Polled		26,283	20,755	14,072	34,979	18,240	29,569	4,654	148,552	86.31%	
Registered Electors		31,525	24,707	18,078	41,136	21,979	34,693		172,118		
Turnout		83.37%	84.00%	77.84%	85.03%	82.99%	85.23%		86.31%		

The following candidates were elected:

- Party mandates - Reinhard Firlinger (FPÖ), 1,016 votes; Erwin Hornek (ÖVP), 2,600 votes; Rudolf Parnigoni (SPÖ), 2,541 votes; and Günter Stummvoll (ÖVP), 5,846 votes.

===== 1995 =====
Results of the 1995 legislative election held on 17 December 1995:

Party		Votes per district							Total votes	%	Seats
Party		Gmünd	Horn	Krems an der Donau City	Krems an der Donau	Waid- hofen an der Thaya	Zwettl	Voting card	Total votes	%	Seats
Austrian People's Party	ÖVP	9,026	10,335	4,031	14,533	8,226	15,410	1,646	63,207	42.43%	2
Social Democratic Party of Austria	SPÖ	11,847	6,078	5,902	11,001	5,505	7,241	1,140	48,714	32.70%	1
Freedom Party of Austria	FPÖ	4,267	3,299	2,811	6,095	3,215	4,841	705	25,233	16.94%	0
Liberal Forum	LiF	697	717	1,004	1,351	521	738	434	5,462	3.67%	0
The Greens	GRÜNE	632	530	687	965	448	694	447	4,403	2.96%	0
No – Civic Action Group; Against the Sale of Austria	NEIN	317	169	138	331	219	391	46	1,611	1.08%	0
Communist Party of Austria	KPÖ	38	25	111	72	44	44	8	342	0.23%	0
Valid Votes		26,824	21,153	14,684	34,348	18,178	29,359	4,426	148,972	100.00%	3
Rejected Votes		857	523	355	912	571	844	33	4,095	2.68%	
Total Polled		27,681	21,676	15,039	35,260	18,749	30,203	4,459	153,067	88.97%	
Registered Electors		31,874	25,014	17,955	40,593	22,021	34,578		172,035		
Turnout		86.85%	86.66%	83.76%	86.86%	85.14%	87.35%		88.97%		

The following candidates were elected:

- Party mandates - Rudolf Parnigoni (SPÖ), 3,143 votes; Willi Sauer (ÖVP), 2,349 votes; and Günter Stummvoll (ÖVP), 5,752 votes.

===== 1994 =====
Results of the 1994 legislative election held on 9 October 1994:

Party		Votes per district							Total votes	%	Seats
Party		Gmünd	Horn	Krems an der Donau City	Krems an der Donau	Waid- hofen an der Thaya	Zwettl	Voting card	Total votes	%	Seats
Austrian People's Party	ÖVP	9,110	10,188	3,853	14,222	8,391	15,633	1,408	62,805	43.10%	2
Social Democratic Party of Austria	SPÖ	11,124	5,453	5,070	9,624	4,829	6,183	955	43,238	29.67%	1
Freedom Party of Austria	FPÖ	4,070	3,329	2,750	6,173	3,259	4,721	877	25,179	17.28%	0
The Greens	GRÜNE	918	822	960	1,473	662	1,101	497	6,433	4.41%	0
Liberal Forum	LiF	839	822	1,043	1,564	551	833	408	6,060	4.16%	0
No – Civic Action Group; Against the Sale of Austria	NEIN	289	143	131	339	210	345	38	1,495	1.03%	0
Communist Party of Austria	KPÖ	51	20	116	49	32	36	9	313	0.21%	0
United Greens Austria – List Adi Pinter	VGÖ	24	7	13	36	12	26	5	123	0.08%	0
Citizen Greens Austria – Free Democrats	BGÖ	13	12	13	16	9	21	2	86	0.06%	0
Valid Votes		26,438	20,796	13,949	33,496	17,955	28,899	4,199	145,732	100.00%	3
Rejected Votes		867	599	356	931	566	807	41	4,167	2.78%	
Total Polled		27,305	21,395	14,305	34,427	18,521	29,706	4,240	149,899	86.80%	
Registered Electors		32,046	25,125	18,059	40,605	22,091	34,763		172,689		
Turnout		85.21%	85.15%	79.21%	84.79%	83.84%	85.45%		86.80%		

The following candidates were elected:

- Party mandates - Rudolf Parnigoni (SPÖ), 5,921 votes; Willi Sauer (ÖVP), 5,341 votes; and Günter Stummvoll (ÖVP), 7,171 votes.
