= Chick Quest =

Austrian post-punk/indie-rock band

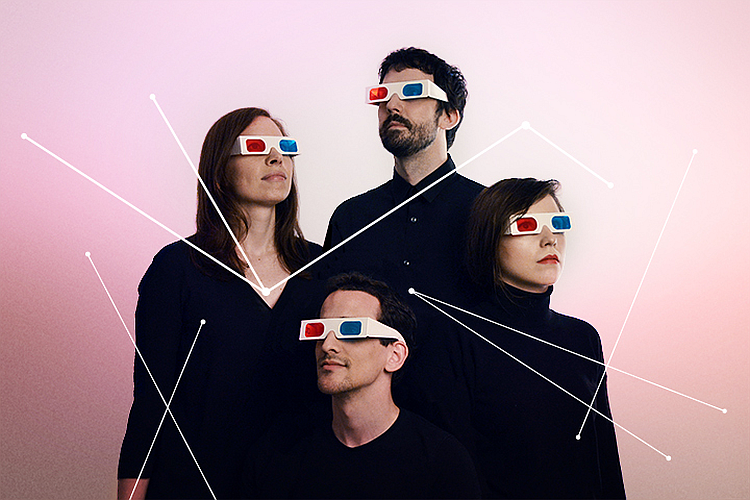

Background information
- Origin: Vienna, Austria
- Genres: Post-punk, indie rock, lo-fi, garage rock
- Years active: 2014–present
- Labels: Independent
- Members: Ryan White; Iris Rauh; Magdalena Kraev; Marcus Racz
- Website: http://www.chickquest.com

Chick Quest are a post-punk/indie-rock band from Vienna, Austria. Their initial concept was to combine chord progressions from old 1960s Italian Western film scores, such as works by Ennio Morricone, with the dancey post-punk of the late 1970s and early 1980s like Talking Heads, B-52's, Manicured Noise and the Clash. The band's name is a nod to cheesy 1960s B-film titles and is meant to be taken as "A girl on a quest" as opposed to "Guys on a quest for chicks".

== History ==
Ryan White (vocals/guitar), an American expat from Athens, Georgia, now living in Vienna, Austria, began the project with his Austrian friend, Iris Rauh (drums), in early 2014. Their original goal was to create a live dance party for their friends in small clubs, playing music they like to dance to and could not find in Vienna. By mid-2014, they added Magdalena Kraev (bass) and completed the lineup by early 2015 with Marcus Racz (trumpet/keyboards) —both Austrian.

Their original "dance party" idea eventually blossomed into bigger shows and festivals, a spot on Austrian television, a debut record in 2015 with glowing reviews, including its release mentioned on Pitchfork, songs premiered on KEXP & CMJ, and an honorable mention as one of six best albums of the year by Der Standard, one of Austria's biggest newspapers.

In 2016, the band started working on their second album, which was released in February 2017 and saw songs featured by AlternativePress, Noisey, and BrooklynVegan, among other outlets.

== Discography ==
=== Studio albums ===
- Vs. Galore (2015)
- Model View Controller (2017)
