= Kiennast =

Austrian wholesale company

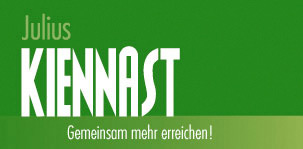
- Native name: Julius Kiennast Einzelhandels GmbH & Co KG
- Industry: Wholesale
- Founded: 1585
- Headquarters: Hauptplatz 7, 3571 Gars am Kamp, Austria
- Website: www.kiennast.at

Kiennast or Handelshaus Julius Kiennast is a company group based in Lower Austria, working in areas of food retail and wholesale, and also in delivery to restaurants and petrol station shops. The company history started in 1585 and is one of the oldest still active trading houses in Austria.

== History ==
The company headquarters in Gars am Kamp was mentioned in a business document in 1585, and Mathias Kiennast took the shop in 1710. In 1910 was installed a gasoline pump, the fuel supplier was Shell since 1925. From 1956 the wholesale trade was taken over the merchants' organization A&O, which later became firm Nah&Frisch. In the middle of the 1990s started the supply of the Austrian storage houses RWA. The restructuring in 1998 created the current form of the company. The 2010 celebration was under the title: 300 years of company Kiennast with the tradition of 425 years of trade house.

As of 2018, its two managing directors were Alexander and Julius Kiennast.

== See also ==
- List of oldest companies
