= Brandweiner =

Brandweiner is a German surname. Notable people with the surname include:

- Heinrich Brandweiner (1910–1997), recipient of the Lenin Peace Prize
- Johann Brandweiner (1894–1974), Austrian footballer
- Lukas Brandweiner (born 1989), Austrian politician
