= Diesner =

Diesner is a surname. Notable people with the surname include:

- Bettina Diesner (born 1970), Austrian tennis player
- Martina Diesner-Wais (born 1968), Austrian politician
