= Michael Breisky =

Austrian jurist (born 1940)

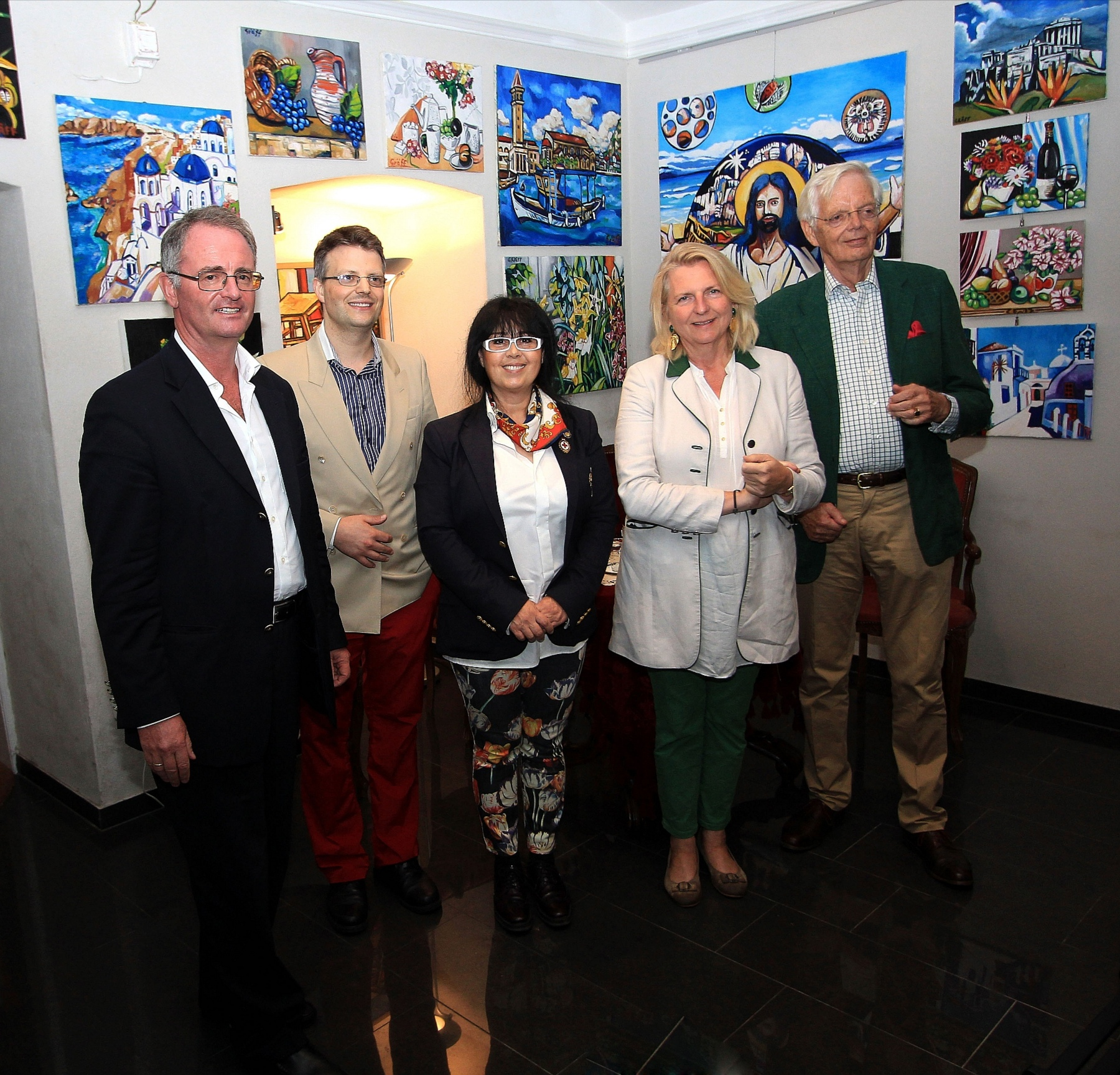
Michael Breisky (right) at "Dialog im Kamptal" with Georg Vetter, Matthias Laurenz Gräff, Georgia Kazantzidu and Karin Kneissl (2020)

Michael Breisky (born 29 December 1940 in Lisbon) is a former Austrian diplomat and, as a globalization critic, is the author of numerous publications on Leopold Kohr and his teaching.

== Breisky family ==
The Breisky family belonged to Austrian nobility. Part of the family bore the title of baron, another the title of knight, from whom Michael Breisky also comes. One of his relatives was the politician Walter Breisky, once chancellor of Austria. Michael Breisky grew up as the son of Hubert von Breisky and his wife Hildegard (née Schmidtmann) in Lisbon, where his father was cultural attaché to the German legation from 1940 to 1945. In 1949 he moved to Austria with his mother.

== Diplomatic service ==
Michael Breisky studied law in Vienna (Dr. iur.) and graduated from the Diplomatic Academy of Vienna. In 1967 Breisky became an employee of the Foreign Service of the Austrian Foreign Ministry. His first foreign posts were in Rio de Janeiro, Oslo and Nairobi. In 1982 Breisky advanced to the position of Austrian consul general in Milan, responsible among other things for South Tyrol. Afterwards he worked, among other things, as head of the South Tyrol department in the Austrian Foreign Ministry and, as chairman of the Austrian commission to examine the "package" on the autonomy of South Tyrol, was instrumental in the amicable settlement of the 1992 South Tyrolean conflict.

Michael Breisky was the Austrian ambassador to Ireland from 1993 to 1999. He then became head of the American Department in the State Department and in 2003 Consul General in New In 2005, Breisky ended his diplomatic career.

== Scientific activity ==
His occupation and expertise in questions of minority protection, autonomy, regionalism and ethics led Breisky to an intensive examination of the ideas of Leopold Kohr even before his retirement, and to the (co-) establishment of the scientific advisory board of the Leopold Kohr Academy in Salzburg. In 2008, Breisky accepted the invitation to a lecture tour on Leopold Kohr at six Chinese universities.

== Books ==
- Mit ‚Austrian Mind' über den Tellerrand hinaus – Zur Wiederkehr ganzheitlich-pragmatischen Denkens (= edition Widerhall, Bd. 1). Perchtoldsdorf 2020, ISBN 978-3-9519838-0-6
- Menschliches Maß gegen Gier und Hass – small-is-beautiful im 21. Jahrhundert, 2018 bei Frank & Frei, Wien, ISBN 978-3-903236-18-9
- Skizzen aus dem diplomatischen Kriegs-Lissabon – Was mir Hubert und Hildegard Breisky über ihre Jahre in Portugal 1940–1945 erzählt haben, Sonderdruck Frank & Frei, Wien 2018, ISBN 978-3-903236-24-0
- Groß ist ungeschickt – Leopold Kohr im Zeitalter der Post-Globalisierung.Passagen Verlag, Wien 2010, ISBN 978-3-85165-924-5
- Welcome to Post-Globalization – The Politics of Second Enlightenment, Human Scale and the Economy of the Mind. New European Publications, London 2009 ISBN 978-1-872410-76-0
- Der Kompass im Kopf – Menschliches Maß und Politik im 21. Jahrhundert. Otto Müller Verlag, Salzburg 2003 ISBN 3-7013-1088-2
