= Georg Vetter =

Austrian lawyer, author and politician (born 1962)

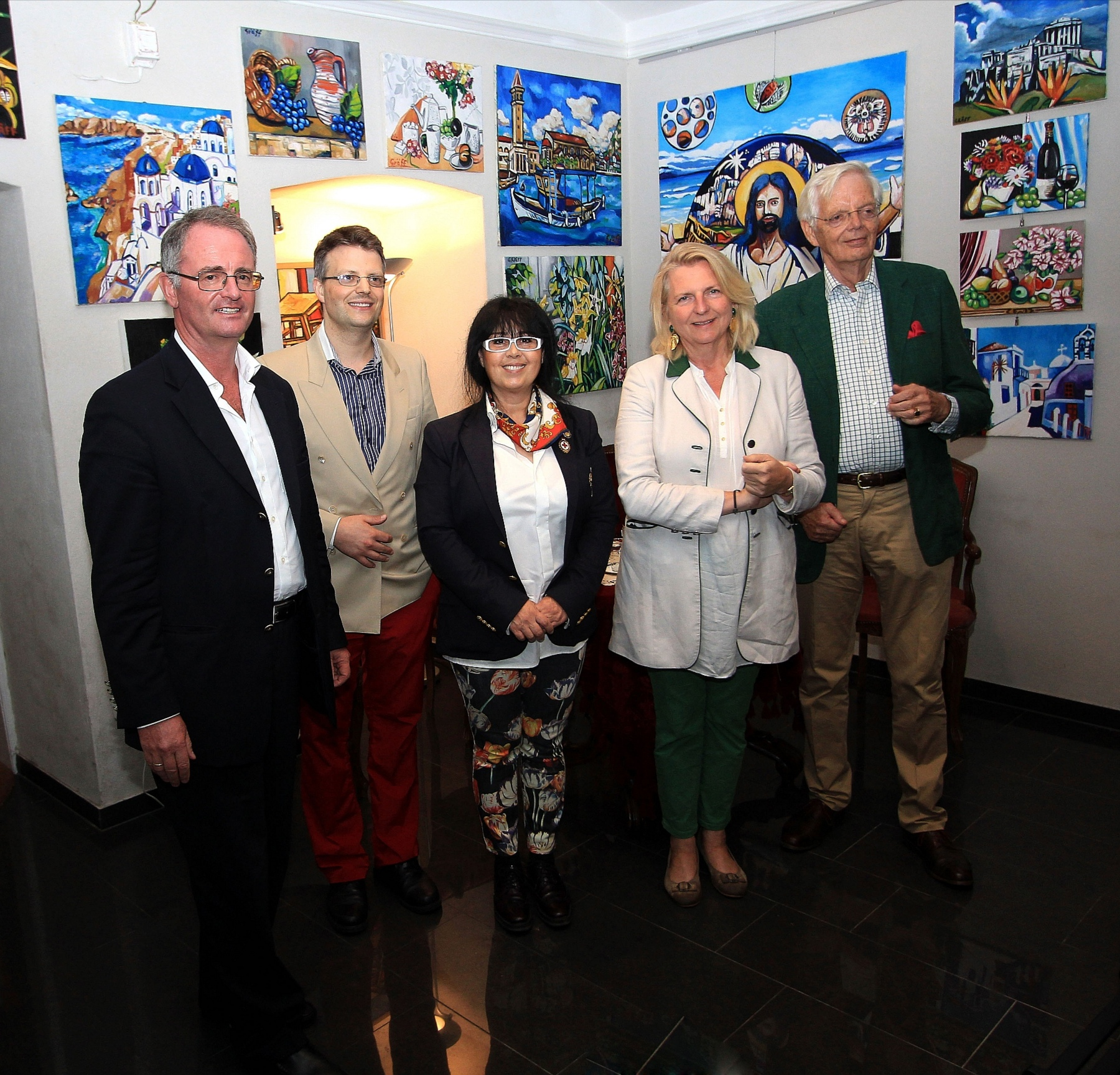
- Georg Vetter (left) at Dialog im Kamptal" with Matthias Laurenz Gräff, Georgia Kazantzidu, Karin Kneissl and Michael Breisky

Member of the National Council
- In office 29 October 2013 – 8 November 2017

Personal details
- Born: 26 April 1962 (age 63)
- Party: Austrian People's Party

Georg Vetter (born 26 April 1962 in Vienna) is an Austrian business lawyer, author and former politician at Team Stronach and Austrian People's Party (ÖVP).

== Biography ==
Georg Vetter studied law and economics in Vienna and Texas. He has been working as a lawyer since 1991.

Vetter was a member of the Team Stronach and moved to the Austrian National Council in October 2013, where he was promoted to deputy chairman of the Parliamentary club. In June 2015, his move to the parliamentary club of the Austrian People's Party (ÖVP) was announced.

In 2017 he was a member of the second Eurofighter committee of inquiry, which inspired him to write his book "Eurofighter 2017. Die Täuschung der Republik". In November of the same year Vetter resigned from the National Council.

Georg Vetter is a board member of the Hayek Institute and President of the Club of Independent Liberals.

== Books ==
- Die neue Macht der Aktionäre. Der Weg zur Aktionärsdemokratie. Ibera, Wien 2005. ISBN 978-3-85052-198-7
- Die daungegradete Republik: Das heutige Österreich aus der Sicht des Feldmarschalls Daun. Ibera, Wien 2011. ISBN 978-3-85052-298-4
- Eurofighter 2017. Die Täuschung der Republik. Ibera, Wien 2017, ISBN 978-3-85052-367-7

== Links ==
- Literature by and about Georg Vetter in the German National Library catalogue
- Biography, contact details and speeches since 1996 of Georg Vetter at the Austrian Parliament (in German)
