= Isabel Frey =

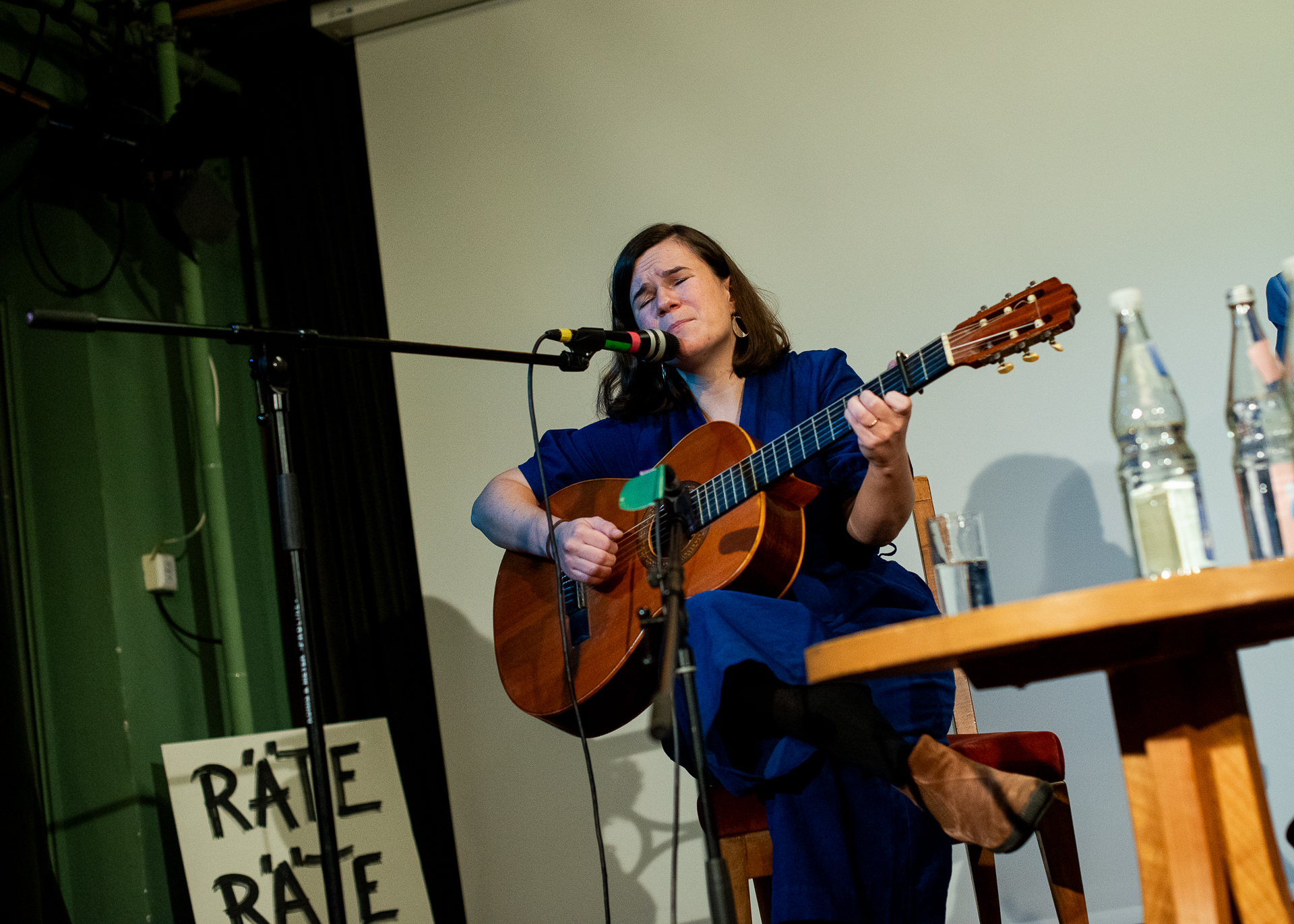

Background information
- Born: Isabel Frey
- Origin: Vienna, Austria
- Occupations: Singer, researcher, activist
- Website: isabelfrey.com

Isabel Frey is an Austrian singer, ethnomusicologist and peace activist. She sings in Yiddish. In 2023, she co-founded the Jewish-Arab peace initiative "Standing Together Vienna". In 2020, she ran for district council in the historically Jewish Leopoldstadt district for the party LINKS Wien in Vienna municipal elections. Her first album, Millennial Bundist, was released in September 2020, and her second album "Di fliendike pave" in October 2024. Her third album “Lider mit Palestine”, described as a “compilation of 17 new Yiddish songs responding to the ongoing genocide in Gaza” was released in July 2025.

== Early and personal life ==
Born in Vienna to a Jewish family, Frey was active in the Socialist-Zionist Hashomer Hatzair youth movement as a child. She is the daughter of liberal newspaper journalist Eric Frey and TV journalist Katinka Nowotny. Her paternal grandparents were Holocaust survivors. Describing her family as a "bit assimilated, but not completely", she attended Sunday school and went to shul on holidays. She did not learn Yiddish as a child, due to her family's "Austro-Hungarian assimilated roots". Her grandparents spoke Hungarian and German, associating Yiddish with Hasidic culture only. As a young woman, after living on a kibbutz in southern Israel, Frey returned to Austria and developed a diasporic, Yiddishist, non-Zionist worldview. Frey became a bat mitzvah at Or Chadasch, the Reform synagogue in Vienna that was founded by her grandparents and where her father serves as president.

== Education and career ==
Frey studied social sciences at Amsterdam University College, as well as medical anthropology and sociology at the University of Amsterdam. In 2024, she completed her Phd in the "Music matters" structured doctoral program at the University of Music and Performing Arts Vienna with a dissertation on contemporary transmission and performance of Yiddish folksong and the politics of the Yiddish voice. She works as a postdoctoral researcher in ethnomusicology and an artist at the Department of Folk Music Research and Ethnomusicology at the University of Music and Performing Arts Vienna.

Frey co-produced the 2025 compilation album Lider Mit Palestine: New Yiddish Songs of Grief, Fury, and Love.

== Politics ==
A self-described "Bundist", "left-wing Jew", and anti-racist, Frey identifies with the "secular, socialist Yiddish" political tradition that was once strong among Central and Eastern European Ashkenazi Jews. As an anti-Zionist and an anti-assimilationist, the Bundist concept of doikayt (hereness) resonates with her. She described the Israeli government as "ethnonationalist". Neither religious nor nationalist, she tries to find other forms of articulating Jewishness in the 21st century that enable transcultural solidarities between Jews and other oppressed groups. Frey dislikes the militarism within Israeli culture and supports a "multinational, liberal, democratic Israel-Palestine", whether that would be in the form of one state or two. In October 2023, she co-founded the Jewish-Arab peace initiative "Standing Together Vienna" which advocates for a ceasefire and a hostage release deal in the Gaza war and for a peace, justice and safety for all people in Israel-Palestine. The group regularly organizes vigils for both Palestinian and Israeli victims of war and terror.

Frey has described philosemitism as being particularly strong in many European countries due to "Holocaust guilt" and a "remembrance culture" of the Holocaust. She believes that philosemitism in Austria and Germany causes Jews to be "fetishized" in a "pseudo-tolerant way". She believes she benefits from white privilege and class privilege as a middle-class white Jewish Austrian, a view she regards as controversial because "in the Austrian theatre of remembrance Jews can only be the most oppressed minority." She has spoken against antisemitism directed against Austrian and German Jews by non-Jewish leftists.

== Discography ==
=== Albums ===
- Millenial Bundist (2020)

== Publications ==
- Frey, Isabel; Lang/Levitsky, Rosza Daniel (July 2024). ""Yiddishists for Palestine": Diasporism and Solidarity through Twenty-First Century Yiddish Song". Journal of Jewish Identities. 17 (2): 111–142. doi:10.1353/jji.2024.a936745. ISSN 1946-2522.
