= Eric Frey =

Austrian journalist and political scientist

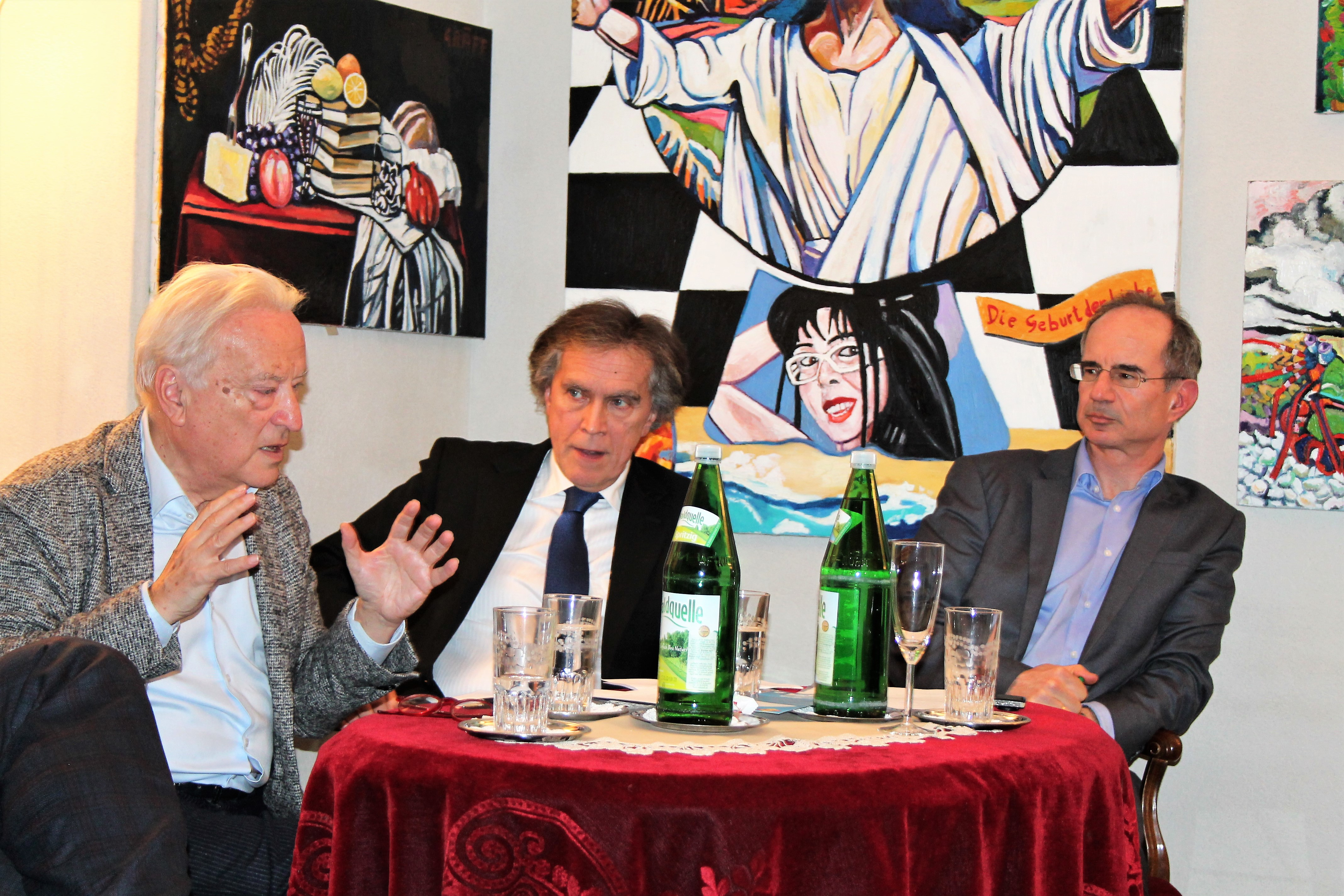
Dialog im Kamptal with Hannes Swoboda, Emil Brix and Eric Frey (2020)

Eric Frey (born 1963, in Vienna) is an Austrian publicist and political scientist. He works as an editor for the Austrian newspaper Der Standard and is correspondent for the London business paper Financial Times.

== Life ==
Eric Frey was born in 1963 in Vienna as the son of Jewish parents who escaped Nazism. In 1981, he moved to the United States of America and attended Princeton University where he studied Public Affairs.

He began his career as a journalist in Frankfurt. There, he worked as a reporter for the AP-Dow Jones News Service until 1990. Since 1991, he has been working for the Viennese newspaper Der Standard and since 1996 as the departmental manager for foreign affairs and economy. He wrote his doctoral thesis in 2003/2004 New Orleans, where he was a visiting professor from 2001 until 2002 at the Marshall Plan Chair for Austrian Studies of the University of New Orleans. The thesis was on history and specifically the trade politics of Bill Clinton.

Frey has published several books, most of which deal with contemporary historical topics.

Frey is the president of Or Chadasch, the Reform synagogue in Vienna founded by his parents.

His daughter is the leftist politician and Yiddishist musician Isabel Frey.

== Political positions ==
=== Ukraine crisis ===
In an op-ed in the newspaper Der Standard of August 2014, he wrote on the Russo-Ukrainian War that negotiations with Russian President Vladimir Putin would be useless, because he would lie to any discussion partner. Instead somehow it would have to be made clear that Putin miscalculated. That would only be possible with further sanctions and if necessary, the discontinuation of all business relations with Moscow, as well as with direct military help for Kyiv in form of weapons deliveries to Ukraine, stationing of NATO troops in Ukraine and US lead air raids against separatists and Russian lines of communication.

== Controversy ==
On 24 November 2014, Frey was part of a televised discussion at the Austrian political talk show Puls 4 News "Pro and Contra" on the Russo-Ukrainian War. Frey called another guest, German stock trader Dirk Müller, a Russian propagandist based on his description of American interests in Ukraine. He also described Johannes Voggenhuber of the Austrian Green party as inhumane towards the Ukrainian people.

== Bibliography ==
- Eric Frey (2017). "The Solow Model and Standard of Living". Undergraduate Journal of Mathematical Modeling: One + Two. 7 (2 (Article 5)): Abstract. doi:10.5038/2326-3652.7.2.4879. ISSN 2326-3652. OCLC 7046600490. Archived from the original on September 22, 2017.
