= Reinhard Teufel =

Austrian politician (born 1979)

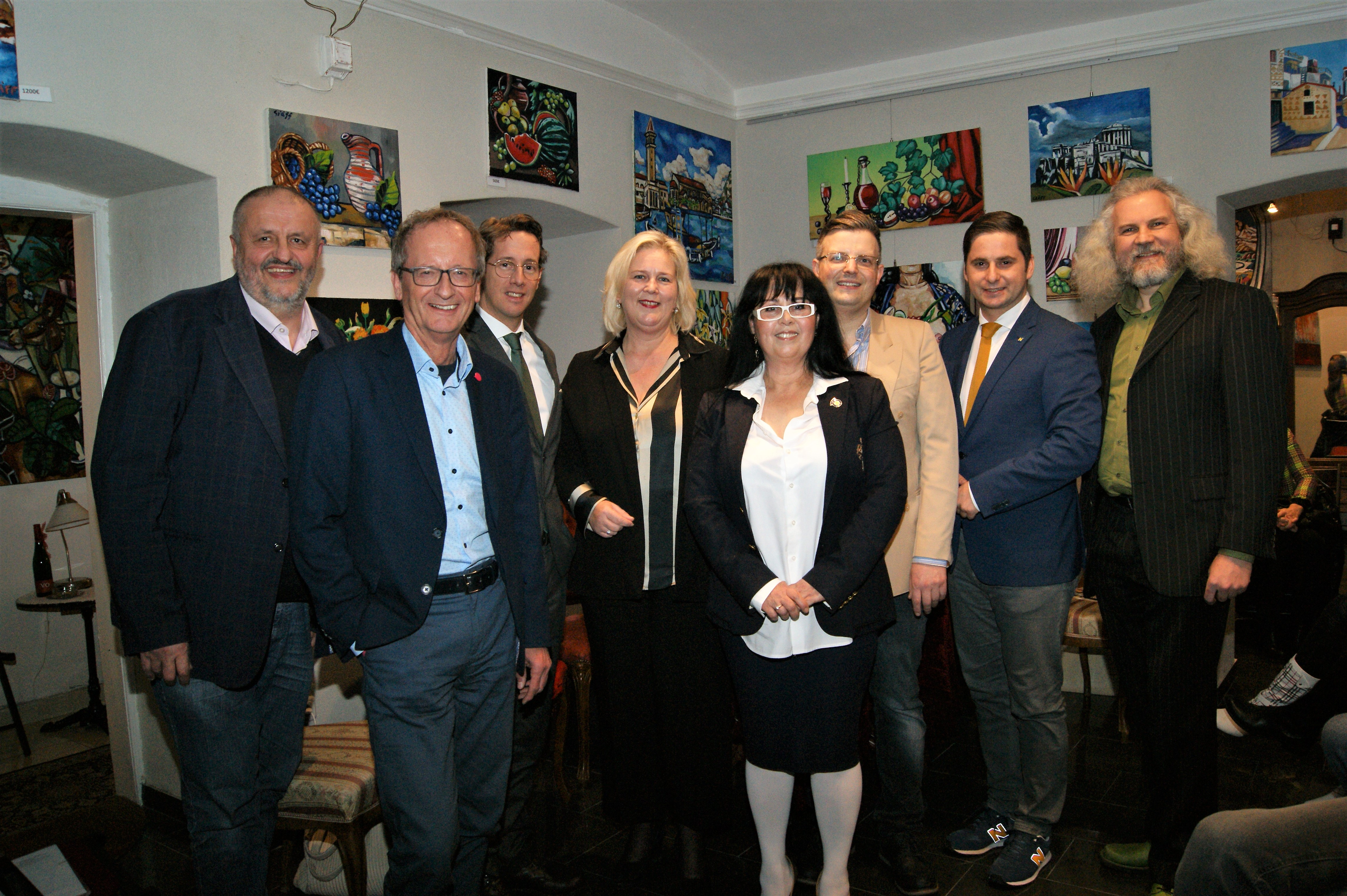
- Teufel in 2023

Member of the Landtag of Lower Austria
- Incumbent
- Assumed office 22 March 2018

Personal details
- Born: 20 May 1979 (age 46)
- Party: Freedom Party

Reinhard Johannes Teufel (born 20 May 1979) is an Austrian politician of the Freedom Party serving as a member of the Landtag of Lower Austria since 2018. Since 2023, he has served as group leader of the Freedom Party in the Landtag.

Teufel worked for the Austrian Research Centers until 2007, when he became an advisor to the Freedom Party's parliamentary group in the National Council. He was elected municipal councillor of Gaming in 2010, and was appointed chief of staff to party leader Heinz-Christian Strache in 2011. He was appointed chief of staff to interior minister Herbert Kickl in 2017, and was elected member of the Landtag of Lower Austria in the 2018 state election. In 2023, he was a participant in the Dialog im Kamptal.
