= Werner Groiß =

Austrian politician (born 1967)

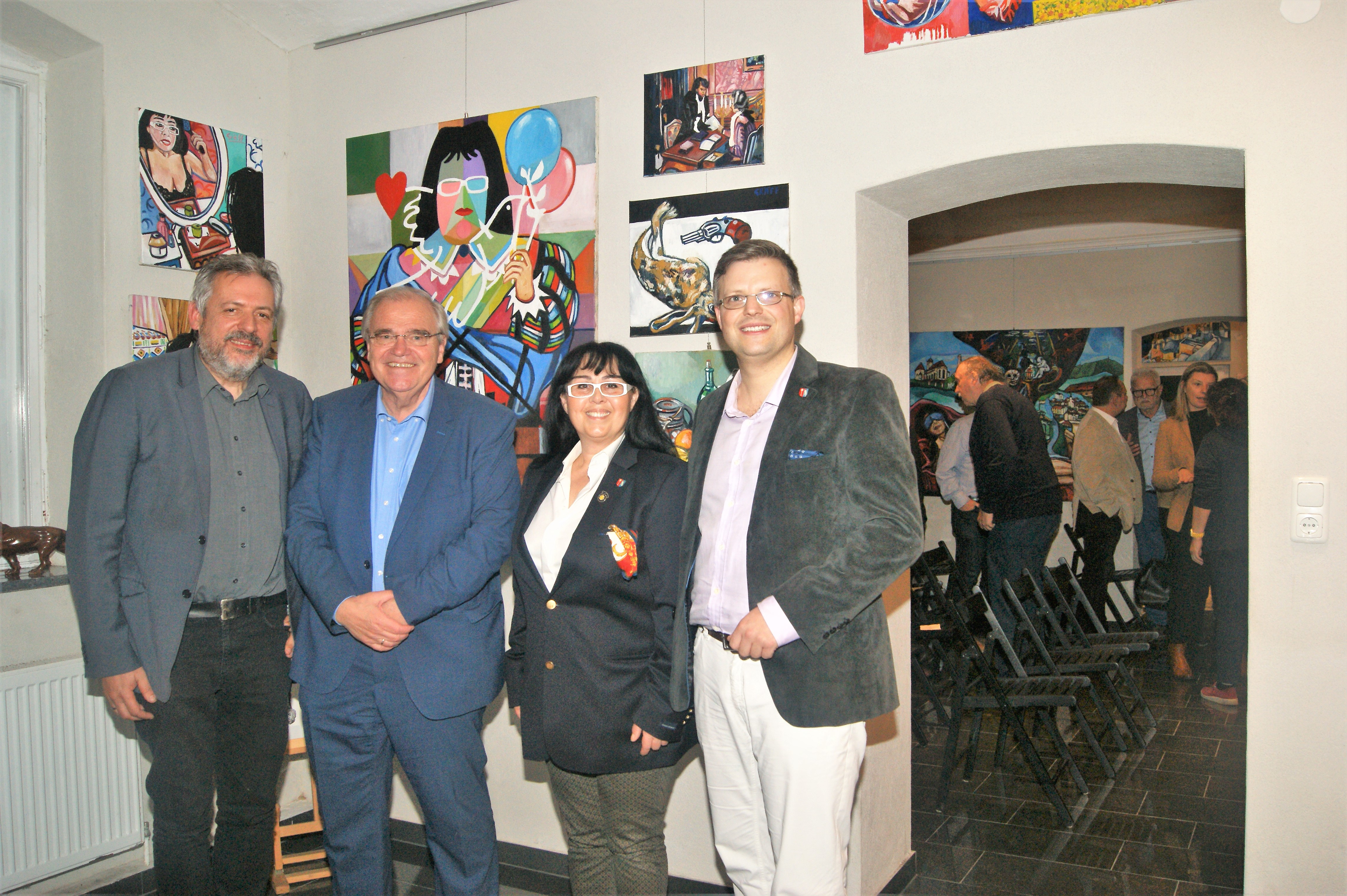
- Werner Groiß, Wolfgang Brandstetter, Georgia Kazantzidu and Matthias Laurenz Gräff at the Dialog im Kamptal (2021)

Member of the National Council
- In office 29 October 2013 – 8 November 2017
- Constituency: 3b Niederösterreich

Personal details
- Born: 6 December 1967 (age 58)
- Party: Austrian People's Party

Werner Groiß (born 6 December 1967 in Gars am Kamp) is an Austrian politician who has been a Member of the National Council for the Austrian People's Party (ÖVP) from 2013 to 2017. He also works as a Statutory auditor, Tax advisor and Entrepreneur.

== Career ==
Werner Groiß was a founding member and chairman of the young ÖVP Gars am Kamp between 1986 and 1988, and in 2000 he became the vice chairman of the ÖVP Gars am Kamp. He was active as a long-standing (managing) councilor in Gars am Kamp until 2019.

In 2013, Werner Groiß succeeded the outgoing Günter Stummvoll as National Councilor for the Waldviertel constituency. In 2016, he succeeded Andreas Zakostelsky as finance spokesman for the ÖVP and chairman of parliamentary financial administration Groiß ended his parliamentary career in December 2017.

Furthermore, Groiß is the spokesman for the Economic Association and the Wirtschaftskammer Waldviertel.

== Private ==
Andrea Scherney, a Paralympic athlete, is one of his cousin's.

== Links ==
- Biography, contact details and speeches since 1996 of Werner Groiß at the Austrian Parliament (in German)
