= Gars am Kamp =

- Municipality
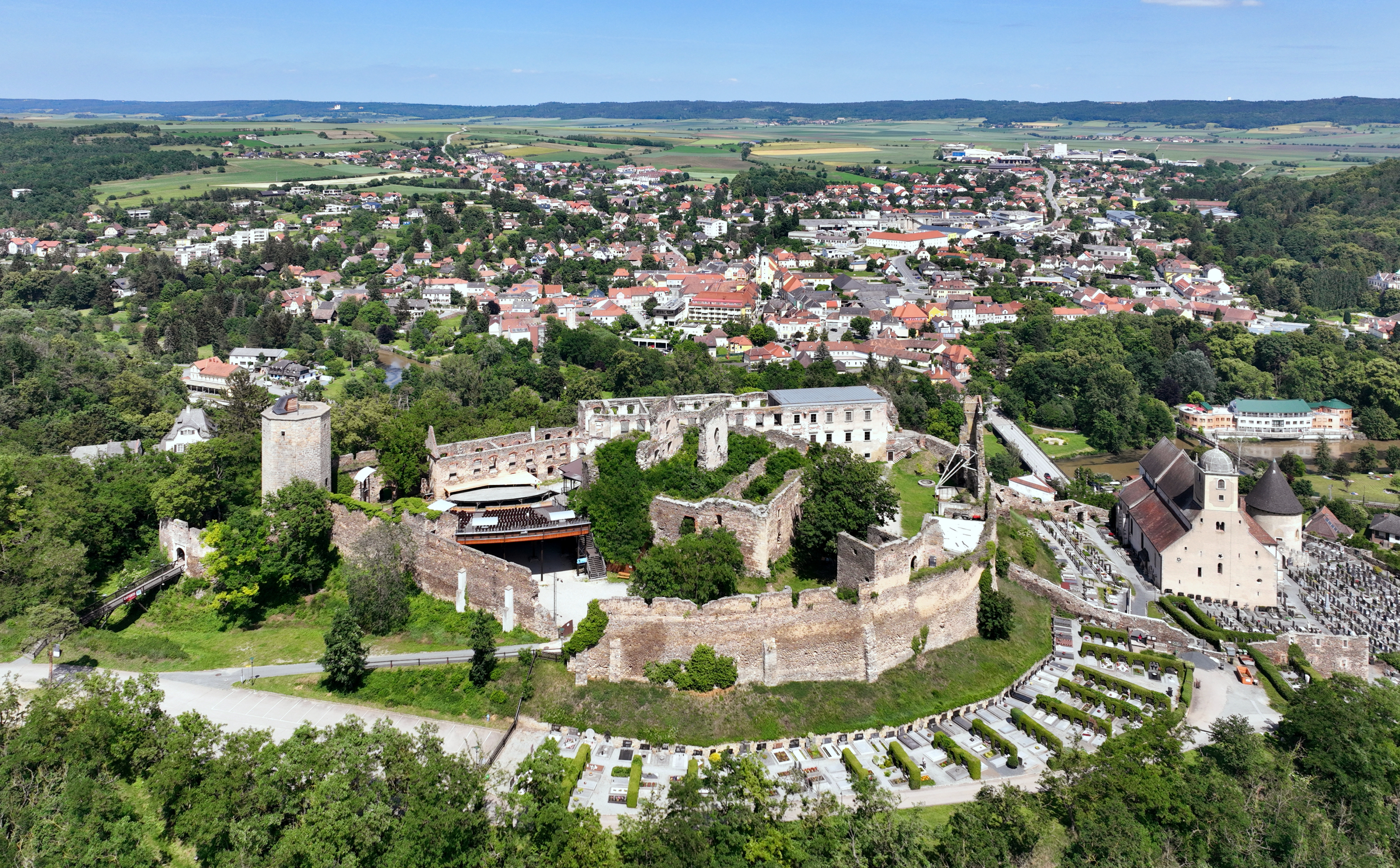
- Gars am Kamp in 2022

- Coat of arms

- Location within Austria
- Coordinates: 48°35′50″N 15°39′40″E
- Country: Austria
- State: Lower Austria
- District: Horn

Government
  - Mayor: Martin Falk (ÖVP)

Area
  - Total: 50.46 km^{2} (19.48 sq mi)
- Elevation: 256 m (840 ft)

Population (2018-01-01)
  - Total: 3,534
  - Density: 70.04/km^{2} (181.4/sq mi)
- Time zone: UTC+1 (CET)
  - Summer (DST): UTC+2 (CEST)
- Postal code: 3571
- Area code: 02985
- Vehicle registration: HO
- Website: www.gars.at

Gars am Kamp is a market town at the Kamp river (Kamptal) in the district of Horn, region Waldviertel in the Austrian state Lower Austria with 3,542 inhabitants (2016).

== History ==
Gars was between 1075 - 1095, during the reign of the House of Babenberg, a former capital of ancient Austria.

In the 19th and 20th centuries, Gars was a traditional summer resort (Sommerfrische). At the end of the 20th century, the climatic health resort (Luftkurort) of Gars experienced another boom thanks to Willi Dungl's health tourism.

== Structure ==
The municipality includes the following 13 localities: Buchberg am Kamp, Etzmannsdorf am Kamp, Gars am Kamp, Kamegg, Kotzendorf, Loibersdorf, Maiersch, Nonndorf bei Gars, Tautendorf, Thunau am Kamp, Wanzenau, Wolfshof, Zitternberg

== Population ==
Historical population
Year	Pop.	±%
1869	2,947	—
1880	2,986	+1.3%
1890	3,131	+4.9%
1900	3,270	+4.4%
1910	3,732	+14.1%
1923	3,848	+3.1%
1934	3,997	+3.9%
1939	4,013	+0.4%
1951	4,293	+7.0%
1961	4,035	−6.0%
1971	3,968	−1.7%
1981	3,732	−5.9%
1991	3,458	−7.3%
2001	3,534	+2.2%
2011	3,478	−1.6%

== International relations ==
=== Twin towns — Sister cities ===
Gars am Kamp is twinned with the following city:

- Gars am Inn, Bavaria, Germany

== Politics ==
- Dialog im Kamptal, non-partisan platform

== Notable people (selection) ==
- Willi Dungl, health expert
- Falco, singer
- Richard Gach, architect
- Helmuth Gräff, artist, poet
- Matthias Laurenz Gräff, artist, historian, political activist
- Werner Groiß, politician, entrepreneur
- Leopold II, Margrave of Austria
- Leopold III, Margrave of Austria, born in Gars
- Marianne Mendt, singer, actress
- Andrea Scherney, paralympic athlete
- Karl Sigmund, mathematician
- Franz von Suppé, composer
- Josef Wiesinger, politician
