= Niederösterreichische Nachrichten =

Austrian weekly newspaper

- Type: Weekly newspaper
- Owner: LAN (Lower Austrian News)
- Publisher: Lower Austrian Press
- Founded: 1965; 60 years ago
- Language: German
- Headquarters: St. Pölten
- Country: Austria
- Website: noen.at

Niederösterreichische Nachrichten (also known as Lower Austrian News and abbreviated as LAN) is a regional weekly newspaper published in St. Pölten, Lower Austria.

== History and profile ==
NÖN was started in 1965 following the merger of several local newspapers. The paper is published weekly and is part of the NÖN Niederösterreichische Nachrichten company. Its publisher is Niederösterreichisches Pressehaus. The paper is based in St. Pölten and provides mostly local news, serving Lower Austria. As of 2011 Walter Fahrnberger and Daniel Lohninger were the editors-in-chief of the paper.

== Circulation ==
NÖN sold 184,000 copies in 2007 and 170,000 copies in 2010. According to Media Analyse 2015/16, the paper was regularly read by 535.000 people, 480.000 of which are from Lower Austria. This gives the paper a reach of 34.2% in Lower Austria, putting NÖN head on head with Kronen Zeitung (33.8%) in the region.
