= Lukas Brandweiner =

Austrian politician (born 1989)

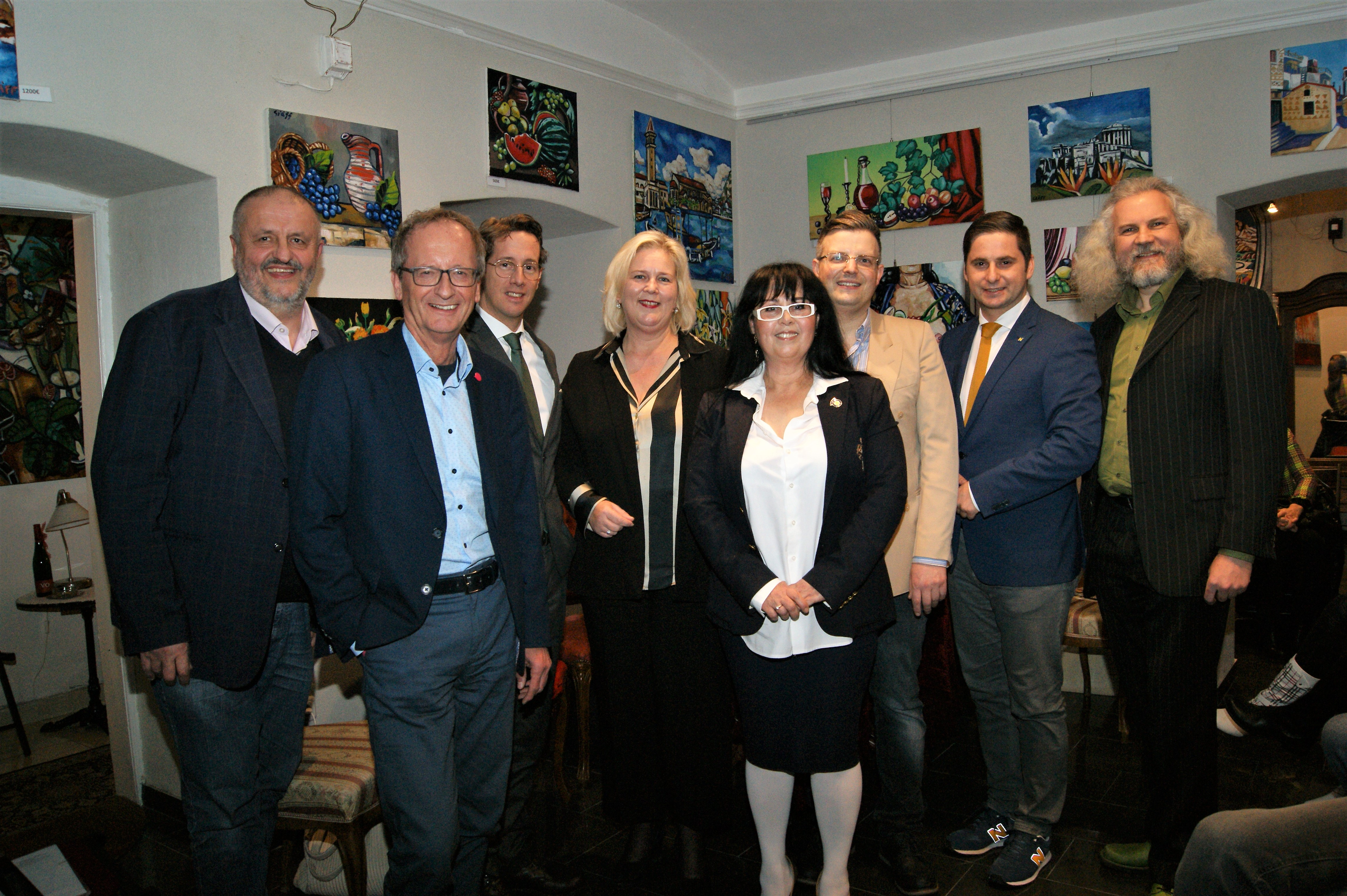
- Brandweiner in 2023

Member of the National Council
- Incumbent
- Assumed office 12 June 2019
- Preceded by: Angela Fichtinger
- Constituency: Waldviertel

Personal details
- Born: 28 May 1989 (age 36)
- Party: Austrian People's Party

Lukas Brandweiner (born 28 May 1989) is an Austrian politician of the Austrian People's Party. Since 2019, he has been a member of the National Council. In 2021, he became leader of the Austrian People's Party in Groß Gerungs.
