= Der Standard =

Austrian daily newspaper

- Type: Daily newspaper
- Owner: Oscar Bronner
- Publisher: Oscar Bronner
- Editor: Gerold Riedmann
- Founded: 19 October 1988; 37 years ago
- Political alignment: Social liberalism
- Headquarters: Vienna
- Country: Austria
- Circulation: 86,000 (2013), 1.1 million online (2011)
- ISSN: 1560-6155 (print); 1563-5430 (web)
- Website: www.derstandard.at

Der Standard (Austrian German: [deːɐ̯ ˈstandard]) is an Austrian daily newspaper published in Vienna. It is considered a newspaper of record for Austria.

== History and profile ==
Der Standard was founded by Oscar Bronner as a financial newspaper and published its first edition on 19 October 1988. German media company Axel Springer acquired a stake in the paper in 1988 and sold it in 1995.

Bronner remains the paper's publisher, Gerold Riedmann is editor-in-chief. Der Standard sees itself as—in a Continental European sense socially and culturally—liberal and independent. Third parties have described the paper as having a left-liberal stance. Until 2007, the editor-in-chief of the daily was Gerfried Sperl, Alexandra Föderl-Schmid succeeded him in the post.

In 2002 the paper was one of four quality daily newspapers with nationwide distribution along with Salzburger Nachrichten, Die Presse, and Wiener Zeitung. Although Der Standard is intended to be a national paper, in the past it had an undeniable tendency to focus on Vienna. This has been mitigated by having editorial offices in other federal states (currently Styria, Upper Austria and Carinthia) and the introduction of regional sections. Der Standard is a paper from which foreign news media readily quote when an opinion from the Austrian press is required. It is one of Austria's best-selling quality newspapers and on 18 June 2005 celebrated its 5000th edition.

Der Standard is published in accordance with the "honour code" of the Austrian press, which sets rules on matters such as a transparent division between news and commentary and the right to privacy. The paper's general editorial stance could be described as socially liberal and most of its regular columnists also tend to this position, although guest writers come from a wide variety of political positions. As a participant in Project Syndicate Der Standard also regularly publishes commentary from individuals with an international reputation, whose work has worldwide distribution as part of this project.

Der Standard is published by the Standard Verlagsgesellschaft m. b. H. In August 2008, the newly created Bronner Online AG bought 49% of the shares of this company, which Süddeutscher Verlag previously owned. The Bronner Family Foundation has long owned 41% of the shares, and Oskar Bronner himself owns the remaining 10%. Süddeutscher Verlag had bought into the company in December 1998; previously, between 1988 and April 1995, Axel Springer Verlag had owned 50% of the shares.

Since 2005, the paper has cooperated with The New York Times and has published The New York Times International Weekly on Mondays, which is a six-page supplement, featuring select articles from the Times in English. Der Standard participates in Atomium Culture, the Permanent Platform for European Excellence that brings together some of the most authoritative European universities, newspapers and businesses to increase the movement of knowledge: across borders, across sectors and to the public at large.

According to the 2007 Austrian Media Analysis, Der Standard has 352,000 readers in Austria, a 5% share of all readers. With a share of 19.4%, the paper is the most widely read newspaper among people with college or university education. A full online edition (Der Standard digital) is available as an e-paper on a subscription-basis.

== Circulation ==
The circulation of Der Standard was 104,000 copies in 2002. In 2004 its circulation was 106,000 copies.

The paper had a circulation of 118,000 copies in 2007. The circulation of the paper was 117,131 copies in 2008 and 108,772 copies in 2009. It was 104,004 copies in 2010. The paper had a circulation of 72,693 copies in 2011. The circulation of the paper was about 86,000 copies in 2013.

== derStandard.at ==
Der Standard has run its own web portal—derStandard.at—since February 1995 and claims this was the first appearance of a German-language newspaper on the web. In Q4 of 2011, according to Die Österreichische Webanalyse, derstandard.at had a readership of 1,135,000 unique users (2,379,231 unique clients in December 2011) and is consequently one of the largest and most wide-ranging web portals in Austria. Articles published online can be commented on by registered users. In 2011, derStandard.at yielded a higher profit than the print edition of Der Standard.

In June 2019, derStandard.at underwent its first major relaunch in almost 19 years, updating the site's design for the first time since September 2000 and introducing up-to-date technologies under the hood.

== See also ==
- Eric Frey
