= Martina Diesner-Wais =

Austrian politician (born 1968)

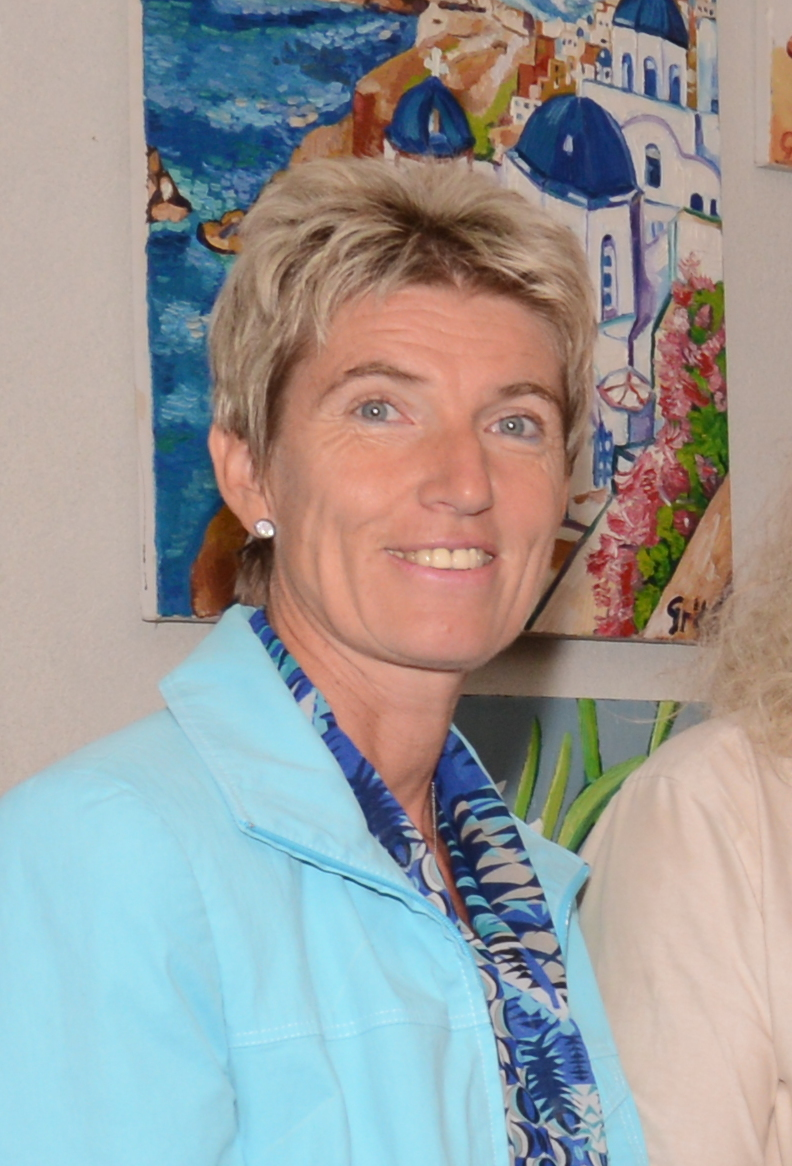
Martina Diesner-Wais in 2019

Martina Diesner-Wais (born 10 February 1968 in Waidhofen an der Thaya) is an Austrian politician (ÖVP). She was a member of the Austrian Federal Council from 2003 to 2013 and has been a member of the National Council since 2013.

== Politics ==
Diesner-Wais was elected a member of the Schrems municipal council in 1990. Between 1995 and 2005 she was a city councilor, then again a councilor, and currently again a city councilor.

Diesner-Wais was sworn in as a member of the Federal Council on 24 April 2003 and was secretary of the Federal Council from 1 January 2006 to 30 June 2006. After the 2013 Austrian legislative election, Diesner-Wais moved from the Federal Council to the National Council. She was able to defend her mandate in the elections of 2017 and 2019.

== Awards ==
- 2014, Grand Decoration of Honour in Gold
