= List of compositions by Paul Moravec =

The following is a list of compositions by Paul Moravec. For a description of selected works and further information on the composer, please see the Paul Moravec page.

== Operas ==
- The Letter (2009)
- The Shining (2016)

== Orchestral ==
- Concerto for Oboe & String Orchestra (2003) (c. 18')
- Northern Lights Electric (2000) (3.3.4.2-3.2.1.1-Timp.Perc.Pno.-Strings)
- Ancient Lights (1994) (2.2.2.2-2.2.1-perc.-strings) (c. 15')
- Aubade (1990) (String Orchestra) (c. 15')
- Concerto for Piano & Orchestra (1992) (Pno solo + 2.2.2.2-2.2.1-perc.-strings) (c. 30')
- Lyric Concerto for Violin & Orchestra (1994) (Vn solo + 2.2.2.2-2.2.1-perc.-strings) (c. 18')
- Montserrat: Concerto for Cello & Orchestra (2001) (Vc solo + 2.2.2.2-2.2.1-perc.-strings) (c. 18')
- Sempre Diritto! (Straight Ahead!) (1991) (2 Ob. 2 Hn. Strings) (c. 14')
- Spiritdance (1989) (3.3.3.2-2.2.1-perc.-strings) (c. 10')
- Streamline (1988) (2.2.2.2-2.2.1-perc.-strings) (c. 15')
- Adelphony (1997) (2.2.2.2-2.2.1-perc.-strings) (c. 5')

== Chamber music ==
- The Time Gallery (2000) (c. 45') (Fl.Cl.Pno.Perc.Vn.Vc.)
- Cool Fire (2001) (c. 22') (Fl.2Vn.Va.Vc.Pno)
- Chamber Symphony (2003) (c. 20') (Fl.Cl.Hn.Vn.Vc.Pno.Perc.)
- Scherzo (2003) (c. 3') (Vn.Vc.Pno)
- Tempest Fantasy (2002) (c. 27') (Cl.Vn.Vc.Pno )
- Vince & Jan: Snapshot, 1945 (2002) (String Quartet)
- Music for Chamber Ensemble (1983) (Fl.Ob.Cl.Hn.Tr.Pno.Vn.Va.Vc.Db.) (c. 5')
- Octocelli (2000) (Cello Octet) (c. 10')
- Northern Lights Electric (1994) (Fl.Cl.Pno.2Vn.Va.Vc.DB) (c. 15')
- Inscape (1996) (Fl.Cl.Vn.Vc.Pno.Perc.) (c. 14')
- The Kingdom Within (1989) (Fl.Cl.Vn.Vc.Pno.Perc.) (c. 18')
- Circular Dreams (1991) (Fl.Cl.Vc.Pno.) (c. 18')
- Quatrocelli (2000) (Cello Quartet) (c. 10')
- String Quartet no. 1 (c. 18')
- String Quartet no. 2 (c. 12')
- String Quartet no. 3 (c. 16')
- Mood Swings (1998) (Vn.Vc.Pno) (c. 18')
- The Open Secret (1985) (Vn.Vc.Pno) (c. 15')
- B.A.S.S. Variations (1999) (c. 3') (Vn.Vc.Pno )

== Brass ==
- Quintessence (1998) (Trumpet Quintet) (c. 12')
- Brass Quintet (1999) (c. 12')
- Hampshire Harmony (1993) (3 Tr.2Hn.2Tbn.Tuba) (c. 10')

== Solo instrument and piano ==
- Sonata for Violin & Piano (1992) (c. 22')
- Protean Fantasy (1997) (Violin.Piano)
- Ariel Fantasy (2001) (c. 4') (Violin.Piano)
- Songs for Violin & Piano (1983)(c. 9')
- Timepiece (1984) (Violin.Piano) (c. 9')
- Lyric Dances (1981) (Flute.Piano) (c. 9')
- B.A.S.S. Variations (1999) (Flute.Piano) (c. 7')
- Autumn Song (2001) (Flute.Piano) (c. 5')
- Walk Away Slowly (1989) (Cello.Piano) (c. 8')
- Epithalamion (1993) (Trumpet.Piano) (c. 5')
- Zu-Zu's Petals (2001) (Marimba.Piano) (c. 5')

== Solo piano ==
- Characteristics (1995) (c. 15')
- Music Remembers (1983) (c. 9)
- Impromptus (1999)(c. 7')
- Piano Triptych (1991)(c. 9')
- Felix In Hollywood (1996) (Film Score for Piano Solo) (8')
- Vai! ("GO!") (2002) (c. 4')

== Solo voice and ensemble ==
- Wings (1983) (Sop.Fl.Cl.Vc.Pno.) (c. 13')
- Whispers (1986) (Tenor.1.1.1.-1.1.1.-strings) (c. 14')
- Sacred Songs (1982) (Baritone.Vn.Vc.Vc.) (c. 10')
- Dramatic Cantata: Spirit (2002) (Tenor.SATB Chorus.Orchestra)
- Fire.Ice.Air (1998) (Tenor.Baritone.Fl.Cl.Pno.Perc.St Quintet) (c. 25')

== Solo voice and piano ==
- Everyone Sang (2003) (c. 3') (Baritone, piano)
- Vita Brevis (2001) (Tenor.Pno) (c. 10')
- Naked Simplicities (1997) (Tenor.Pno) (c. 15')
- Evensong (1991) (Tenor.Piano) (c. 14')
- Innocent Dreamers (1985) (Soprano.Piano) (12')
- Everyone Suddenly Burst Out Singing (1988) (Soprano.Piano) (c. 13')
- The American Sublime (1981) (Soprano.Piano) (c. 10')
- Riddle Me A Dream (2002) (Soprano.Piano) (3')
- The Rose and the Nightingale (2002) (Soprano.Piano) (3')
- A Crowd of Stars (2002) (Tenor.Piano) (3')
- Salute (2003) (High voice.piano)

== Choral works ==
- Songs of Love and War (1997) (SATB.Baritone solo.strings.trumpet solo) (c. 20')
- Personals (1999) (SATB.Orchestra) (c. 15')
- A Spirit of Power (1996) (SATB.Orchestra) (c. 8')
- The Living (1997) (SATB.Organ) (c. 5')
- Four Transcendent Love Songs (1986) (SATB Chorus) (c. 11')
- Three Anthems (1983) (SATB Chorus) (c. 10')
- Pater Noster (1979) (SATB Chorus) (c. 4')
- Ave Verum Corpus (1979) (SATB Chorus) (5')
- Missa Miserere (1979) (SATB.Orchestra) (c. 20')
- i thank you, GOD (1983) (SSAA Chorus) (c. 4')
- Thanksgiving Song (2001) (SATB Chorus) (c. 4')
- Spirit (2002) (c. 18') (Tenor solo, SATB Chorus, Orchestra)
- No Words (2002) (TTBB Chorus, Piano)
- The Blizzard Voices (2008) (SATB, soprano solos, mezzo-soprano solo, tenor solo, baritone solo, bass solo, orchestra) (c. 70')
