= Alfred Šramek =

Austrian operatic tenor

Alfred Šramek (5 April 1951 – 23 June 2016) was an Austrian operatic bass and bass-baritone. From 1975, he was a member of the Vienna State Opera ensemble.

== Life ==
Šramek was born in Mistelbach. His parents were employed in Loosdorf castle, where his father worked as a coachman. At the age of six, he moved to Vienna with his family. He received his first musical training at the age of ten as a member of the Mozart Boys' Choir. At the request of his parents, he learned the profession of a draper. He later studied singing at the Konservatorium Wien Privatuniversität with Hilde Zadek and Peter Klein.

In 1974, he received his first engagement at the Stadttheater St. Pölten. In April 1974, he sang Don Alfonso in a conservatory performance at the Theater an der Wien in Così fan tutte. At the invitation of his teacher Hilde Zadek, members of the management of the Vienna State Opera were also present. Three days later he was invited by the opera to continue learning at the studio there. He subsequently auditioned with Hans Swarowsky, who not only accepted him into the opera studio but also invited him to attend the conducting course in Ossiach. At the age of 23, he was brought to the State Opera by the then director Rudolf Gamsjäger, where he made his debut as Master and Kapellsänger in Palestrina. He was an ensemble member of the Vienna State Opera from 1 February 1975 until his death.

From 1978 to 1985, he performed at the Salzburg Festival, and in 1982 he made a guest appearance at the Bregenz Festival. In 1981, he appeared in the world premiere of the opera Baal by Friedrich Cerha, and in 2002 he sang the roles of the coffin-tableman and the devil in the world premiere of Cerha's opera Der Riese vom Steinfeld. Among his parade roles was Bartolo in Rossini's Il barbiere di Siviglia, in which he appeared 175 times. He also played Benoit in La Bohème and Mesner in Tosca over 100 times each. In total, he created around 100 roles in over 2500 performances at the Haus am Ring. Šramek also appeared at the Volksoper Wien and gave recitals where, among Schubert songs, folk songs and Viennese songs, he also told anecdotes from his life. He made his last appearance at the Vienna State Opera on 16 April 2016 in the role of Mesner.

From 1982, Šramek lived again in the Weinviertel, in a vintner's house in Mistelbach. In his spare time, he travelled around his homeland with his horse-drawn carriage or his tractors. In 2008, Šramek was diagnosed with cancer, which resulted in kidney failure. Since then he was dependent on dialysis until he died at the age of 65 in Mistelbach. Alfred Šramek had been widowed since 2012. His daughter Katharina Dorian is a musical theatre actress and appeared in Tanz der Vampire as Rebecca, among others. His second daughter Johanna died in 2015 at the age of 26.

The family grave is located in the city cemetery Mistelbach (field C, number 57).

== Awards ==
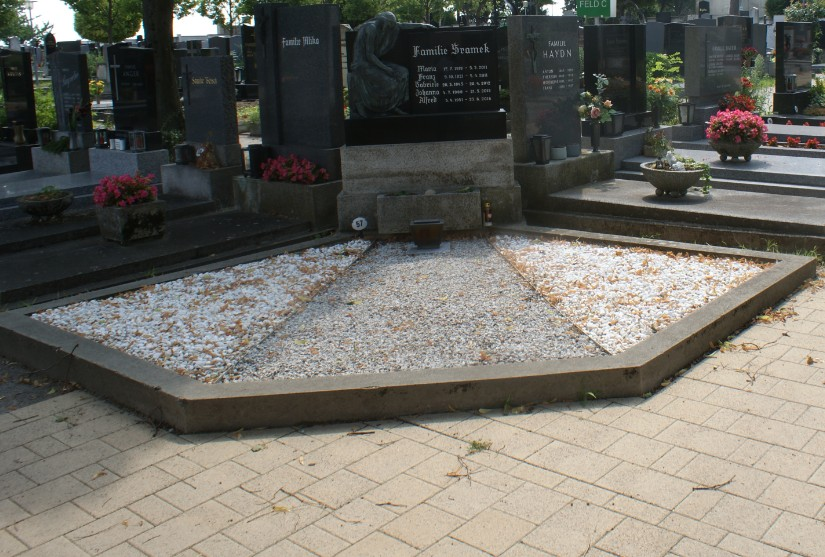
Gravesite of Alfred Sramek

- In 1989, he was awarded the title of Austrian Kammersänger.
- In May 2014 he was appointed Honorary Member of the Vienna State Opera and received the Honorary Ring of the Vienna State Opera.

== Recordings (selection) ==
- Friedrich Cerha: Baal, with Martha Mödl, Emily Rawlins, Margarethe Bence, Waldemar Kmentt, Heinz Holecek, Alfred Šramek, conductor: Christoph von Dohnányi, Wiener Philharmoniker, Amadeo, Live recording of the premiere in 1981

== Filmography (selection) ==
- 1982: Die verkaufte Braut
