= List of developments of The World (archipelago) =

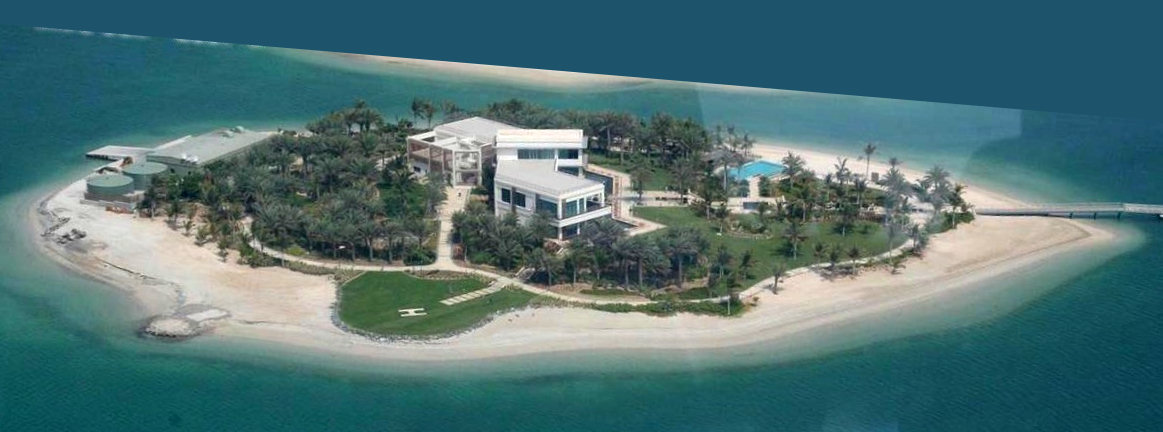
An island with model homes on the westernmost edge of the "Greenland" group.

The World islands map, annotated with existing developments as of 2014

These are some of the developments which were scheduled for construction on various islands of The World in Dubai, United Arab Emirates. However the construction was halted due to the 2008 financial crisis, except for one island gifted to race car driver Michael Schumacher by the ruler of Dubai, Mohammed bin Rashid Al Maktoum.

Islands on The World were intended to fall into several categories:

- Low density: residential islands
- Medium and high density: residential areas.
- Resorts: mainly hotels and resorts.
- Commercial: shopping, entertainment, restaurants, cafes
- Transportation: hubs for transportation by boat to mainland Dubai.

	Islands	Owners	Cost	Project name	Construction started	Construction end (expected)
1	Antarctica	Dubai Multi Commodities Centre		Pearls of Arabia	Feb 2008	2010
2	Asia, North	VC Bank (developer World Development Co.)	AED 1.5 Billion	VC Bank resort	May 2008	2010
3	Australia	Investment Dar, Kuwait (14 islands)	USD 3.5 Billion	OQYANA	Apr 2005	
4	Austria	Josef Kleindienst / Kleindienst Group, Austria		Heart of Europe		
5	Beijing	Bin Hu, China				
6	Brunei	Salya Corporation	AED 1.2 Billion	FTV resort	Apr 2008	2011
7	Canada	Nakheel Properties, (20 islands)		Coral Island	May 2007	2010
8	China	Oasis Group		Lynncoln World Island Resort	Jul 2008	2010
9	Ecuador	ACI Real Estate (Germany)	AED 2 Billion	Leisure Resort	Feb 2008	
10	Ethiopia					
11	Finland	Salya Corporation	AED 1.2 Billion	FTV Palace	Apr 2008	2011
12	France	Select Group Select Property JV	AED 5.5 Billion	Aquitainia	Jun 2008	2013
13	Germany	Kleindienst Group		Heart of Europe	February 2010	
14	Great Britain	SafMus Holdings		Britain The World		2014
15	Greece	Baron Jean van Gysel de Meise	USD 260 Million	V.Greece	Aug 2007	2010
16	Greenland	Sheikh Mohammed / Nakheel		Villas		
17	Greenland	Dubai Infinity Holdings (designer Karl Lagerfeld)		Isla Moda (Fashion Island)	Jan 2008	2012
18	Greenland	Nakheel		One & Only Hotel Resort		
19	Hong Kong	Bin Hu, China				
20	Huainan	Oasis Group		Oasis resort Dubai	Nov 2008	
21	Ireland	Larionovo, Ireland	AED 142 Million	Ireland in the Sun		
22	Kazakhstan	tars Dome Realty		Pangkor Laut	2007	2012
23	Macao	Bin Hu, China				
24	Malaysia	Harshit Kantaria		Isola di Portofino		
25	Moscow	SafMus Holdings		Moscow The World	2007	2015
26	Nanjing	Bin Hu, China				
27	Netherlands	Kleindienst Group		Heart of Europe	December 2009	
28	New Zealand	Investment Dar, Kuwait (14 islands)	USD 3.5 Billion	OQYANA	Apr 2005	
29	Novaya Zemlya	Cinnovation Group, Singapore	USD 200 Million	Nova Island Resort & Spa	Feb 2008	
30	Orenburg	Perseus Property Management		Perseus Resort	2005	2010
31	Rostov	Perseus Property Management		Perseus Resort	2005	2010
32	Shanghai	Mr Bin Hu, Zhongzhou International President		Hotel resort & villas	Oct 2007	
33	Siberia	Limitless	USD 350 Million	World Island Resort	Sep 2008	2010
34	Siberia	Pearl Dubai		Archangel	2008	
35	Somalia	Opulence Holdings	AED 1 Billion	Jal Aashwa	Nov 2007	
36	Spain	Select Group / Select Property JV	AED 5.5 Billion	Aquitania	Jun 2008	2013
37	South America	Seven Tides International		Anantara World Islands Resort		
38	Ukraine	Kleindienst Group		Heart of Europe		
39	Sumatra	Harshit Kantaria		Isola di Portifino		
40	Sweden	Kleindienst Group		Heart of Europe		
41	Switzerland	Kleindienst Group		Heart of Europe		
42	Thailand	Profile Real Estate, Dubai	USD 110 Million	Jasmine Gardens	Sep 2006	2011
43	Turkey	Günal Insaat / MNG Holding		Turkey, The World	Jun 2008	
44	Scotland	CJV Associates		Bonnie Alba	Feb 2020	
