= Kleindienst =

Kleindienst is a surname. Notable people with the surname include:

- Josef Kleindienst, Austrian property developer
- Richard Kleindienst (1923–2000), American lawyer and politician
- Thérèse Kleindienst (1916–2018), French librarian, archivist, and palaeograph
- Tim Kleindienst (born 1995), German footballer
