= Anthony Michaels-Moore =

English operatic baritone

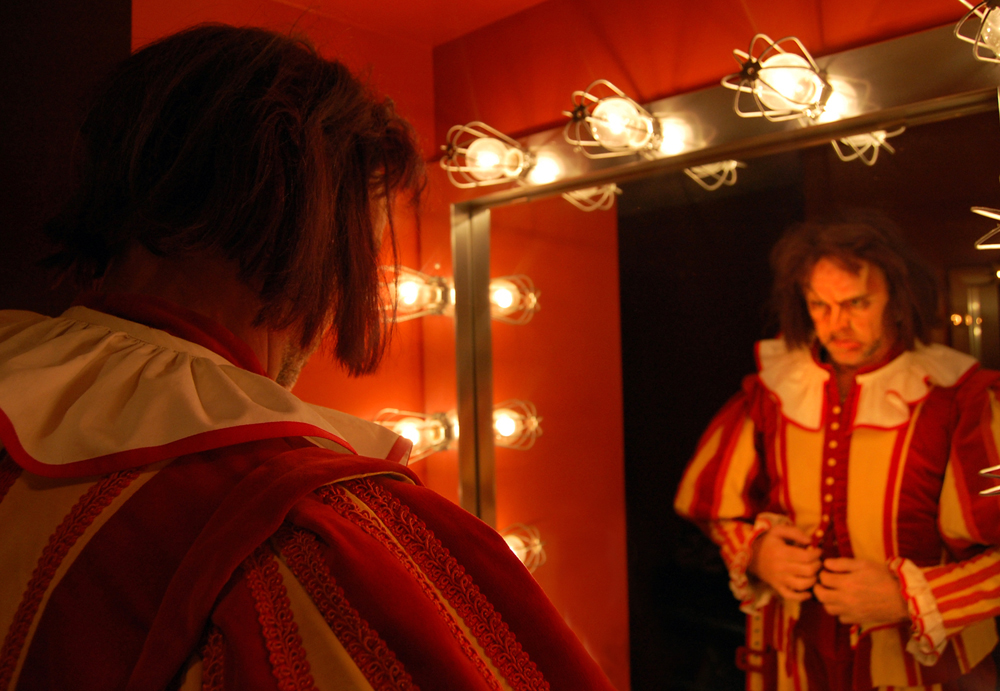
British Baritone Anthony Michaels-Moore preparing behind the scenes as the title role in Verdi's Rigoletto at Opéra de Montréal, October 2010.

Anthony Michaels-Moore (born 8 April 1957) is an English operatic baritone and the first British winner of the Luciano Pavarotti International Voice Competition (Philadelphia, 1985). Michaels-Moore has since performed in many of the world's major opera houses across Europe, the Americas, and Asia. He has distinguished himself as a specialist in Verdi and Puccini roles, most renowned for his portrayals of Falstaff, Nabucco, Rigoletto, Simon Boccanegra, Iago in Otello, Germont in La traviata, Sharpless in Madama Butterfly, and Scarpia in Tosca. In addition to the standard repertoire, he has sung and recorded the baritone roles of some of the less-known 19th Century Italian operas, as well as the popular English art song cycles by Stanford and Vaughan Williams.

Michaels-Moore currently lives in Santa Fe, New Mexico. He is the first opera singer to provide the voice of Zozobra when he performed the role of old man gloom for the 96th Burning of Zozobra on 4 September 2020.

== Biography ==
=== Early years ===
Michaels-Moore was born in Essex. Between 1975 and 1978, he was commissioned as a second lieutenant in the British Army's Royal Tank Regiment while studying music and history at Newcastle University upon Tyne, and, after a year at Fenham teacher training college, he became a primary school teacher. From 1981 onward he studied singing privately, became a member of the chorus at the English Bach Festival from 1982 to 1984. He attended the Royal Scottish Academy of Music and Drama from 1984 to 1985, earning a MMus/MA in Opera. In 1985 Michaels-Moore was named the first British winner of the Luciano Pavarotti Competition and sang the roles of Messenger (Oedipus rex) for Opera North and Scarpia in Tosca for Scottish Opera Go Round.

=== Subsequent career ===
His career has been centered on the Italian repertoire, starting with lyric roles, but now focused on the great Verdi baritone roles. A review of his 2009 performances of Rigoletto with English National Opera noted his ability to be both "gloriously lyrical and terrifyingly baleful at the same time", combining beautiful Italianate legato with "monstrous power". Another reviewer of that production opined that "he is [Britain's] leading Verdi baritone". Performances in Canada as Rigoletto ("performing with amazing presence, his dark voice suited the character perfectly… brought a remarkable breadth of expression to the role") and in Europe as Scarpia ("he is obsequiously, sadistically, loathsomely mellifluous") as well as Falstaff in 2010 have also drawn high praise.

Michaels-Moore made his debut at London's Royal Opera House, Covent Garden in 1987 and has subsequently appeared in many productions there including La Bohème, Pagliacci, The Barber of Seville, The Marriage of Figaro (1998), Andrea Chénier (1998), Tosca (2000), Macbeth (1997 & 2002), Falstaff (2003), Lucia di Lammermoor (2004), La traviata (2006), Il trovatore (2007), L’elisir d'amore (2009), and Madama Butterfly (2011). He has also appeared with all the other major British companies: English and Welsh National Operas, Opera North, Scottish Opera and Glyndebourne Festival Opera.

In Europe he has appeared at major houses such as the Vienna State Opera, La Scala, Milan, the Opéra National de Paris, Munich's Bayerische Staatsoper, the Staatsoper and Deutsche Oper in Berlin, Barcelona's Liceu, La Monnaie in Brussels, the Grand Théâtre de Genève, Madrid's Teatro Real, Zurich Opera House (Falstaff, Otello), Oper Köln (Tosca, La Forza del Destino), and Teatro dell'Opera di Roma (Curlew River).

In North America Michaels-Moore has appeared at all of the major houses and some of the regional ones including New York's Metropolitan Opera, the San Francisco Opera, the Lyric Opera of Chicago (Attila), Pittsburgh Opera (Otello), Opera Colorado, Florida Grand Opera, Los Angeles Opera (Billy Budd), Lyric Opera of Kansas City (La traviata), Opera Philadelphia (Cold Mountain), and Opéra de Montréal (Rigoletto).

In the US, Michaels-Moore has a particularly strong relationship with the Santa Fe Opera; in their summer festivals he has appeared in classic Verdi parts such as Simon Boccanegra (2004), Falstaff (2008), and Germont pere (2009). Anthony has also appeared at the festival in less familiar roles and new works; singing the title role in Mozart's The Impresario and the Emperor in Stravinsky's The Nightingale in 2014, and creating the role of Robert Crosbie in the world premiere of Paul Moravec's The Letter in 2009, as well as the roles of Father Monroe and Pangle in the world premiere of Cold Mountain in 2015. Anthony's 2009 appearances as Robert Crosbie in The Letter brought him particular critical approval.

In South America the baritone has appeared in Andrea Chénier at the Teatro Colón in Buenos Aires and in Aida at the Theatro Municipal in São Paulo.

== Honors and awards ==
2017: Grammy nomination for Best Opera Recording – Jennifer Higdon's Cold Mountain recorded live at The Santa Fe Opera

2004: Grammy nomination for Best Classical Album recording – LSO Live: Britten: Peter Grimes with Sir Colin Davis conducting the London Symphony Orchestra

1995: Royal Philharmonic Society Music Award, the highest recognition for live classical music-making in the United Kingdom

1985: First British winner of the Luciano Pavarotti Competition in Philadelphia, USA

== Repertoire ==
=== Verdi ===
- Title-roles in Nabucco, Macbeth, Rigoletto
  Simon Boccanegra and Falstaff
- Francesco Foscari in I due Foscari
- Ezio in Attila
- Germont in La traviata
- Count di Luna in Il trovatore
- Stankar in Stiffelio
- Monforte in I vespri siciliani
- Don Carlo in La forza del destino
- Rodrigo in Don Carlos
- Iago in Otello
- Ford in Falstaff
- Amonasro in Aida

=== Puccini ===
- Lescaut in Manon Lescaut
- Marcello in La Bohème
- Scarpia in Tosca
- Sharpless in Madama Butterfly
- Jack Rance in La fanciulla del West

=== Donizetti ===
- Enrico in Lucia di Lammermoor
- Belcore in L'elisir d'amore
- Antonio in Linda di Chamounix

=== Other Italian repertoire ===
- The Count in The Marriage of Figaro by Mozart
- Figaro in The Barber of Seville by Rossini
- Licinius in La Vestale by Spontini
- Gérard in Andrea Chénier by Giordano
- Alfio in Cavalleria rusticana by Mascagni
- Silvio and Tonio in Pagliacci by Leoncavallo
- De Guiche in Cyrano de Bergerac by Alfano

=== Repertoire in other languages ===
- Title-roles in Eugene Onegin by Tchaikovsky and Hamlet by Thomas
- Oreste in Iphigénie en Tauride by Gluck
- Lescaut in Manon by Massenet
- Zurga in The Pearl Fishers by Bizet
- Escamillo in Carmen by Bizet
- Balstrode in Peter Grimes by Britten
- The Ferryman in Curlew River by Britten
- Robert Crosbie in The Letter by Paul Moravec
- Mr. Redburn in Billy Budd by Britten
- Emperor in Le rossignol by Stravinsky
- D. Adamson in CO_{2} by Giorgio Battistelli
- Father Monroe and Pangle in Cold Mountain by Jennifer Higdon

== Recordings ==
=== Complete operas ===
- Orazio in Orazi e Curiazi by Mercadante with David Parry and the Philharmonia Orchestra (Opera Rara)
- Balstrode in Peter Grimes by Britten with Sir Colin Davis and the London Symphony Orchestra (LSO Live)
- 2nd Yeoman/2nd Citizen in The Yeomen of the Guard with Sir Neville Marriner (Philips Classics)
- Alphonse in La favorita by Donizetti with Marcello Viotti (BMG Classics)
- Enrico in Lucia di Lammermoor by Donizetti with Sir Charles Mackerras (Sony)
- Ford in Falstaff by Verdi with John Eliot Gardiner (Decca)
- Egberto in Aroldo by Verdi with Fabio Luisi (Philips Classics)
- Renato in A Masked Ball by Verdi with David Parry (Chandos)
- La vestale by Spontini with Riccardo Muti (Sony)
- Father Monroe and Pangle in Cold Mountain with Miguel Hart-Bedoya (Pentatone)

=== Other recordings ===
- Szymanowski's Stabat Mater with Claus Peter Flor (BMG Classics)
- Orff's Carmina Burana with André Previn (Deutsche Grammophon)
- Purcell's The Fairy Queen with Nikolaus Harnoncourt (Teldec Classics)
- Puccini arias with the Royal Opera House Orchestra (Conifer)
- Mendelssohn's Die erste Walpurgisnacht with the Philharmonia Orchestra
- Songs of the Sea, Songs of Travel recital disc with the song cycles of Stanford and Vaughan Williams (Opus Arte).
