= Die erste Walpurgisnacht =

1843 poem by Johann Wolfgang von Goethe

- Cantata by Felix Mendelssohn
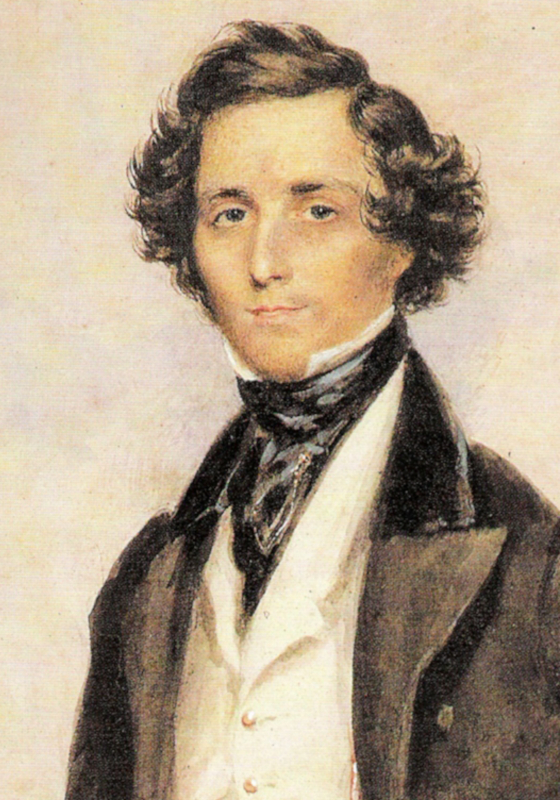
- The composer in 1829
- English: The First Walpurgis Night
- Opus: 60
- Text: Poem by Johann Wolfgang von Goethe
- Language: German
- Based on: Walpurgis Night
- Performed: 10 January 1833: Berlin
- Published: 1843
- Duration: 36 minutes
- Movements: 10
- Scoring: alto, tenor, baritone and bass soloists; SATB choir; orchestra

Die erste Walpurgisnacht (The First Walpurgis Night) is a poem by Johann Wolfgang von Goethe telling of efforts by Druids in the Harz Mountains to practice their pagan rituals in the face of new and dominating Christian forces.

It was set to music by the young Lutheran Felix Mendelssohn as a secular cantata (or "Sinfonie-Ballade" in the composer's correspondence) for soloists (alto, tenor, baritone, bass), chorus and orchestra. Mendelssohn completed this work in an initial version in 1831, which was first performed at his parents' home after Goethe's death the following year and then publicly on 10 January 1833 at the Sing-Akademie in Berlin with himself on the podium. A decade later he extensively revised the cantata before allowing it to be published in 1843 as a "Ballade", his Opus 60, consisting of a programmatic overture followed by nine movements and lasting about 35 minutes:

1. Overture — Das schlechte Wetter; Der Übergang zum Frühling (Bad weather; Transition to Spring)
2. Es lacht der Mai (May is in full bloom) — tenor; Chorus of Druids; People
3. Könnt ihr so verwegen handeln? (Could you be so rash, so daring?) — alto; Old Woman; Chorus of Wives
4. Wer Opfer heut zu bringen scheut (Whoever fears to sacrifice) — baritone; Priest; Chorus of Druids
5. Verteilt euch, wackre Männer, hier (Divide your forces, valiant men) — Chorus of Druid Watchmen
6. Diese dummen Pfaffenchristen (Christians and their priests are witless) — bass; Watchman; Chorus of Watchmen
7. Kommt mit Zacken und mit Gabeln (Come with prongs and pitchforks) — Chorus of Druids; People
8. So weit gebracht, dass wir bei Nacht (It's come so far that now by night) — baritone; Priest; Chorus of Druids; People
9. Hilf, ach hilf mir, Kriegsgeselle (Help, oh help me, comrade) — tenor; Chorus of Christian Watchmen
10. Die Flamme reinigt sich vom Rauch (The flame cleanses itself of smoke) — baritone; Priest; Chorus of Druids; People

== Background ==
Goethe wrote this text to be set to music, intending it for his friend Carl Friedrich Zelter, who tried twice, in 1799 and 1812, but did not complete a setting. Mendelssohn, who knew Goethe, first took it up in 1830.

The story is about how a prank allows for a local tradition to take place in spite of opposition from an intolerant new regime. The Druids and local heathen would celebrate May Day, but, as a women's chorus warns, this is now forbidden. The Druid priests counter that those who fear to sacrifice deserve their chains. A comic solution emerges as a Druid watchman suggests a masquerade of the Devil, spirits, and demons to frighten the occupying Christians. The Christians are scared away, and the Druids and heathen are left to celebrate Spring and the Sun.

The attractions of this text for Mendelssohn likely were the ghost scene (compare his incidental music to A Midsummer Night's Dream) and the triumph (by guile) of an oppressed group in an occupied land, an important Enlightenment idea, as well as one perhaps reflecting the composer's Jewish background: the final verses of the oratorio emphasize an abstract divinity ("dein Licht") over a threatened earthly ritual ("den alten Brauch"). According to Melvin Berger, Mendelssohn was raised a Protestant but "was never fully accepted as a Christian by his contemporaries, nor was he ever fully cut off from his Judaic heritage." Consequently,

Musicians have long debated whether Mendelssohn's three major choral works reflect his religious duality—born into what had been a Jewish family, but living as a Lutheran. The main subject of St. Paul is a figure from the New Testament who, although born as a Jew, became an early leader of Christianity. The First Walpurgis Night sympathetically describes pagan rituals and presents Christians in a poor light. And Elijah probes the wisdom of an Old Testament prophet from Israel.

== Recordings ==
- 1952, Igor Markevitch, Vienna Symphony, Wiener Singakademie, Sieglinde Wagner (alto), Anton Dermota (tenor), Otto Edelmann (bass)
- 1969, Frederic Waldman, Musica Aeterna Orchestra & Chorus, Lili Chookasian (alto), Ernst Haefliger (tenor), Hermann Prey (baritone), Raymond Michalski (bass)
- 1974, Kurt Masur, Leipzig Gewandhaus Orchestra, Rundfunkchor Leipzig, Annelies Burmeister (alto), Eberhard Büchner (tenor), Siegfried Lorenz (baritone), Siegfried Vogel (bass)
- 1978, Christoph von Dohnányi, Vienna Philharmonic, Wiener Singverein, Margarita Lilowa (alto), Horst Laubenthal (tenor), Tom Krause (baritone), Alfred Šramek (bass)
- 1990, Michel Corboz, Gulbenkian Orchestra, Gulbenkian Choir, Brigitte Balleys (alto), Frieder Lang (tenor), Gilles Cachemaille (baritone)
- 1993, Francesco D'Avalos, Philharmonia Orchestra, Philharmonia Chorus, Jean Rigby (alto), Robert Tear (tenor), Anthony Michaels-Moore (baritone), Richard Van Allan (bass)
- 1997, Claus Peter Flor, Bamberg Symphony Orchestra and Choir, Jadwiga Rappé (alto), Deon van der Walt (tenor), Anton Scharinger (baritone), Matthias Hölle (bass)
- 2016, Douglas Boyd, Orchester Musikkollegium Winterthur, Zürcher Sing-Akademie, Birgit Remmert (alto), Jörg Dürmüller (tenor), Ruben Drole (baritone), Reinhard Mayr (bass)

== Notes ==
Sources

- Berger, Melvin (1993). Guide to Choral Masterpieces: A Listener's Guide. New York: Anchor Books. ISBN 9780385422482.
- Pahlen, Kurt (1990). "Die erste Walpurgisnacht". The World of the Oratorio. Portland, Oregon: Amadeus Press.
