= Loosdorf Castle =

Building in Lower Austria, Austria

- Schloss Loosdorf
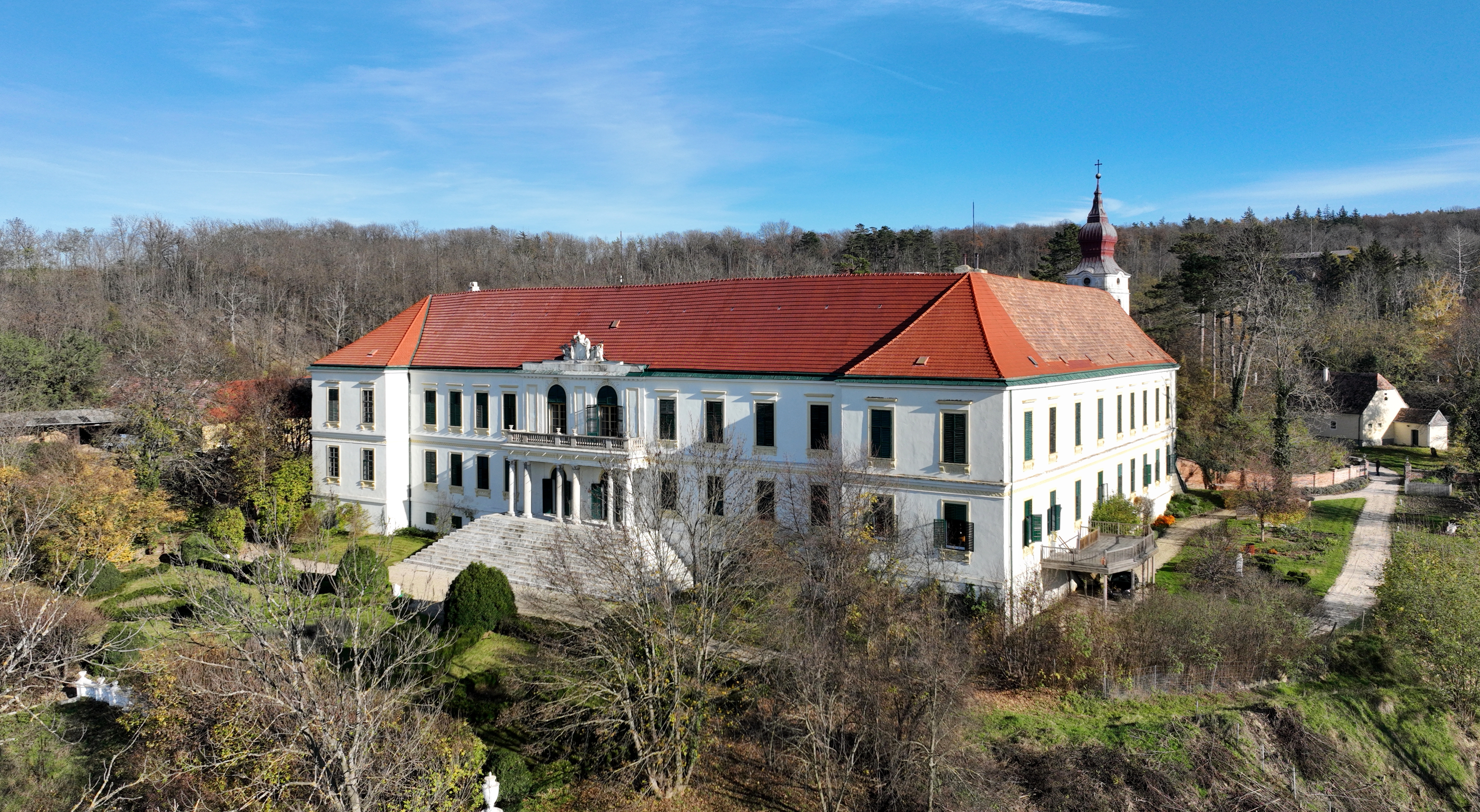
- West-southwest view of Loosdorf Castle

- Location within Austria

General information
- Architectural style: Renaissance Classicsim
- Location: Fallbach, Austria
- Coordinates: 48.6507664°N 16.4491671°E
- Owner: Piatti family

Loosdorf Castle is located in the municipality of Fallbach in Austria.

== History ==
Originally Loosdorf Castle was built as a fortress in medieval times. It was first officially mentioned in 1320, however, based on certain archived documents it was most likely built already in the 10th century. In the course of the Thirty Years' War and due to a massive fire in 1645 parts of the castle were destroyed. Afterwards the castle changed its owners frequently. In 1740 the Liechtenstein Family became the owner of the castle. Between 1760 and 1810 Emmanuel Duke of Liechtenstein executed a lot of construction and decoration works in and around the castle. Based on its long-standing history the castle shows medieval, classicistic and renaissance elements.

1834 Count Friedrich Piatti acquired Loosdorf castle and moved the family residence and their porcelain collection from Dresden to Loosdorf. They were the first Piatti's who partly lived there. Since then the castle is in the possession of the Piatti Family.

== Porcelain collection ==
There is a vast collection of exquisite porcelain at Loosdorf Castle, but the majority of the collection was vandalized in the chaotic aftermath of World War II and the shards have been kept at the castle since then. Regarding the ceramics collection at Loosdorf Castle, approximately 70 – 80% are of Japanese and Chinese origin. In 2018 a team of Japanese experts headed by Masaaki Arakawa, Professor of Gakushuin University, started to research and renovate the porcelain. In 2020 parts of them had been exhibited at the Tokyo Okura Museum of Art. 2021 the exhibition was brought to the Aichi Prefectural Ceramic Museum.
