= Mistelbach =

Town in Lower Austria, Austria

Mistelbach Mistlboch
- Municipality
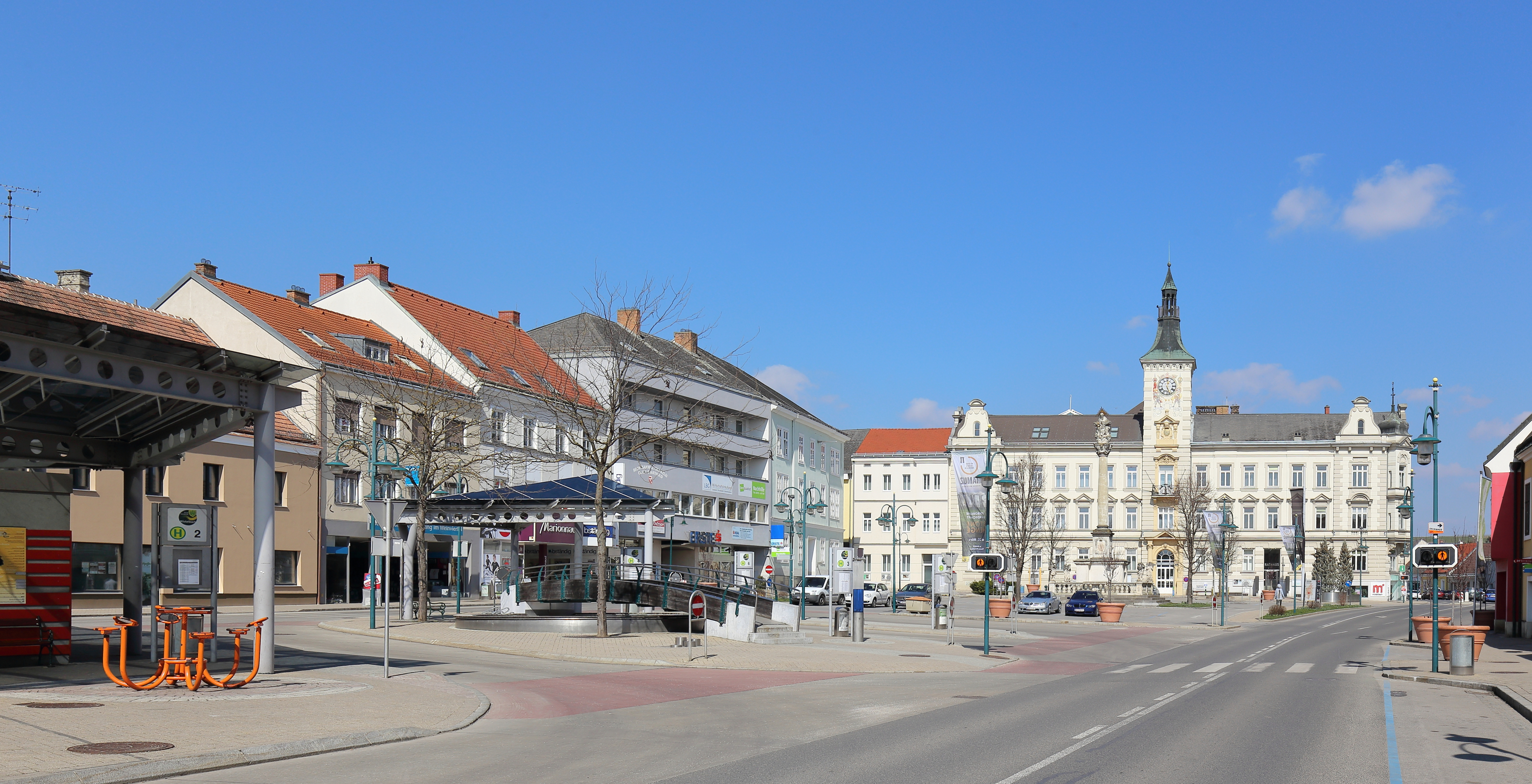
- Town square with the town hall

- Coat of arms

- Location within Austria
- Coordinates: 48°34′00″N 16°34′00″E
- Country: Austria
- State: Lower Austria
- District: Mistelbach

Government
  - Mayor: Erich Stubenvoll (ÖVP)

Area
  - Total: 131.44 km^{2} (50.75 sq mi)
- Elevation: 190 m (620 ft)

Population (2024)
  - Total: 12,036
  - Density: 91.570/km^{2} (237.17/sq mi)
- Time zone: UTC+1 (CET)
  - Summer (DST): UTC+2 (CEST)
- Postal code: 2130
- Area code: 02572
- Vehicle registration: MI
- Website: www.mistelbach.at

Mistelbach an der Zaya (German pronunciation: [ˈmɪstl̩ˌbax]; Mistelbach on the (River) Zaya; Central Bavarian: Mistlboch) is a town in the northeast of Austria in Lower Austria, one of Austria's nine federal states. It is located roughly 40 km northeast of Austria's capital Vienna. Furthermore, it consists of 8 subordinated municipalities.

== Geographical location ==
Mistelbach is located in the North East of Lower Austria's Wine Quarter (Weinviertel), approximately 25 to 30 km from the Czech and the Slovak borders. It lies next to the main road connection between Brno (Czech Republic) and Vienna (Road B7).

== History ==
Early settlements in the Mistelbach area can be traced back to pre-Christian times.

Around 1130, Mistelbach was mentioned in official deeds for the first time. After the Lords of Mistelbach died out around 1370, the royal estates of Wilfersdorf were given to the House of Lichtenstein.

Mistelbach was granted its first right to hold markets in 1372. Today, the town still hosts four markets per year. Mistelbach received its town charter on 5 July 1874.

In the 19th century, Mistelbach was strongly influenced by its connection to the Austrian Eastern Railway. It eventually became the district's capital. In the 20th century, the town experienced difficulties caused by its geographical proximity to the Iron Curtain. Nevertheless, Mistelbach developed into a regional center of the Eastern Winequarter (Weinviertel).

== Politics ==
The current mayor is Erich Stubenvoll of the Austrian People's Party. The district council has 37 seats. Apportionment according to the district council elections from 26 January 2025:

- ÖVP: 20 seats
- SPÖ: 8 seats
- FPÖ: 5 seats
- Greens: 2 seats
- Independent: 2 seats

== Schools ==
- HTL (Higher Technical School) for Healthcare Technologies
- HAK & HAS (Higher Commercial Academy/Higher Commercial School)
- BORG (Grammar School)
- HS (Public School)
- VS (Elementary School)
- ASO (School for Mentally Handicapped Children)
- Vocational School
- Wine Farmer's School
- Nurse's Training School

== Sights ==
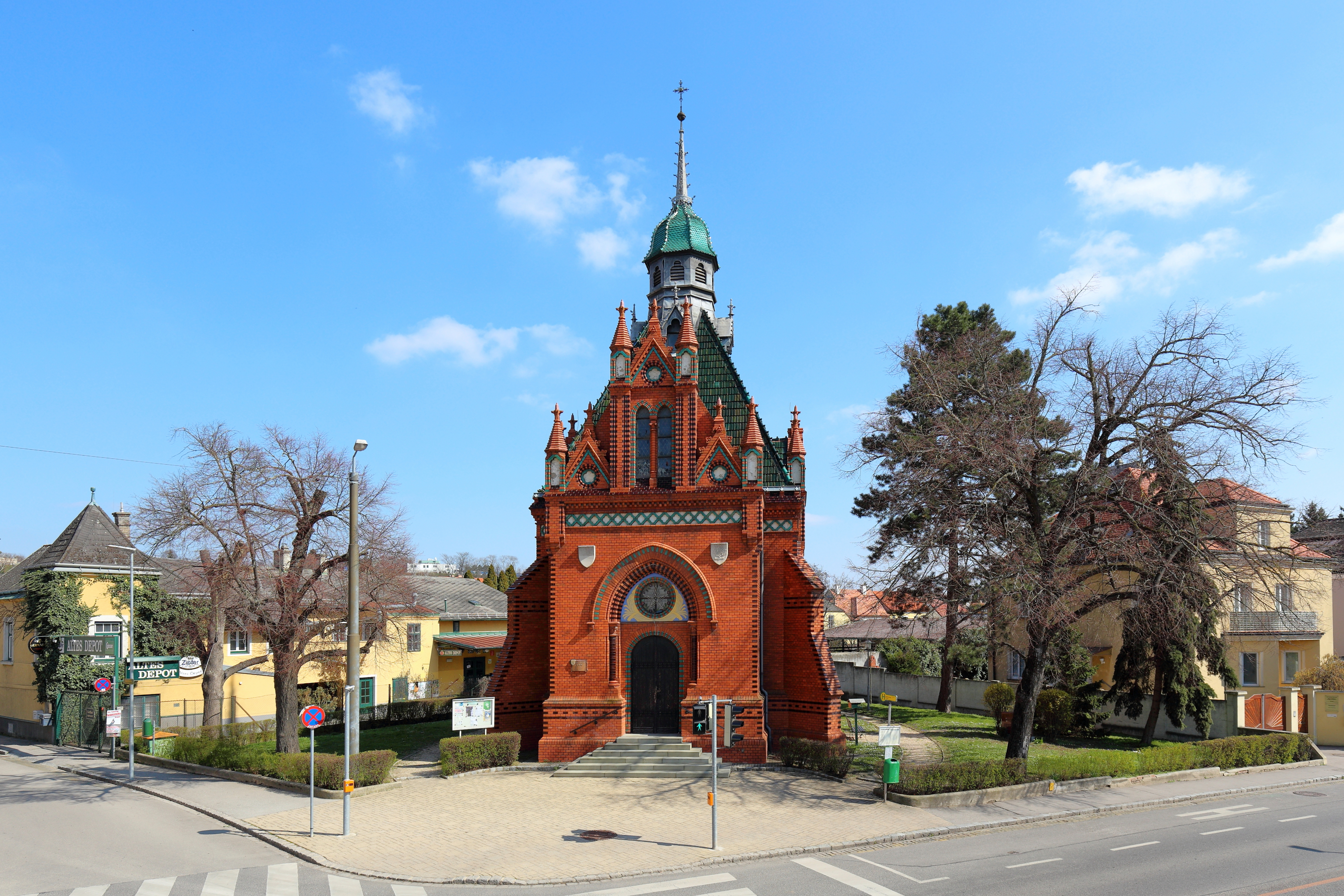
Lutheran church in Mistelbach; built 1905

- Gothic Church on Church Hill

built around 1500, with a gothic Madonna out of sandstone

- Romanic mortuary (Karner)

built around 1200

- Town Hall
- Trinity Column
- Baroque castle (Barockschlößl) in Museum Lane (Museumsgasse)
- Monastery of the Fraternity of the Barnabiten

built 1687, with precious ceiling frescos by Kainz, Rossaforte and Maulpertsch

- Column commemorating Mistelbach's suffering under the Black Death (Pestsäule)
- Weather Station in Mistelbach's Town Park
- Town center (Stadtsaal)
- Museum Center Mistelbach

including the Hermann Nitsch Museum, opened in May 2007
Hermann Nitsch lived near Mistelbach, in the small village of Prinzendorf. The artist is famous for his unconventional style and for his performance art, for which he also faces considerable criticism.

- Culture Scenery (Kulturlandschaft) around Paasdorf
- Historic Barn (Hofstadl), built in the 19th century in the so-called ship-body style Siebenhirten.

Mistelbach is also home to one of the region's most popular, though traditional Vienna-style coffee houses "Cafe Harlekin" which has become an icon of the city's lifestyle over the years.

== Subordinated municipalities ==
- Ebendorf
- Eibesthal
- Frättingsdorf
- Hörersdorf
- Hüttendorf, within the municipality of Mistelbach
- Kettlasbrunn
- Lanzendorf, within the municipality of Mistelbach
- Paasdorf
- Siebenhirten

== Economy and infrastructure ==
In 2001 there were 583 non-agricultural enterprises in Mistelbach. In 1999 agriculture- and forestry-related enterprises amounted to 281. According to 2001 census data 4,776 people out of the total population worked in Mistelbach. The labor force participation rate is 45.9%.

== Gallery ==
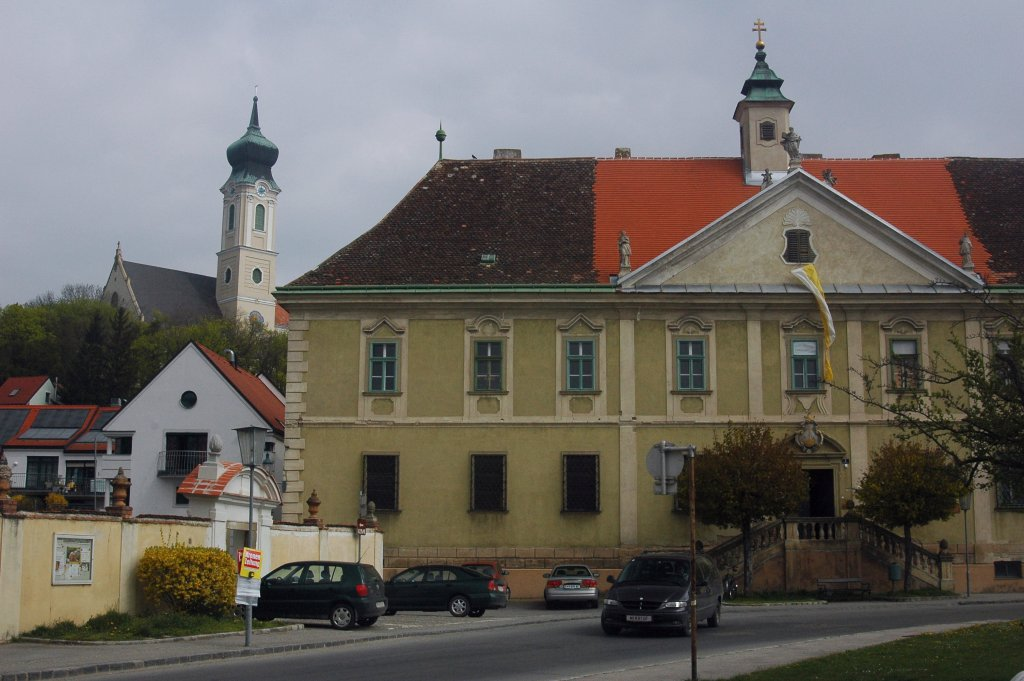

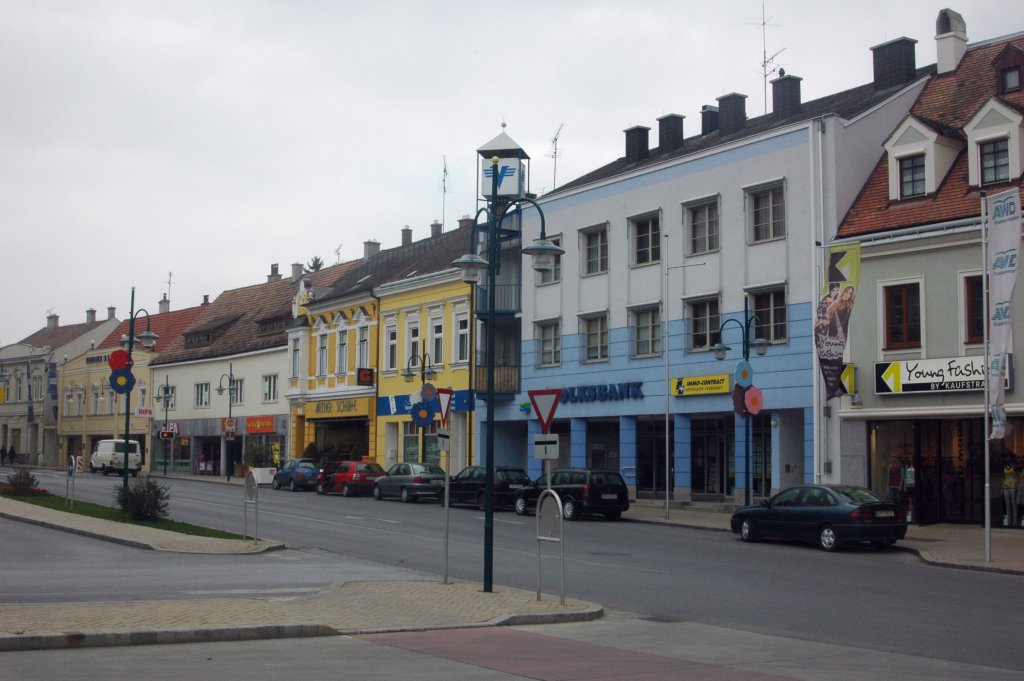

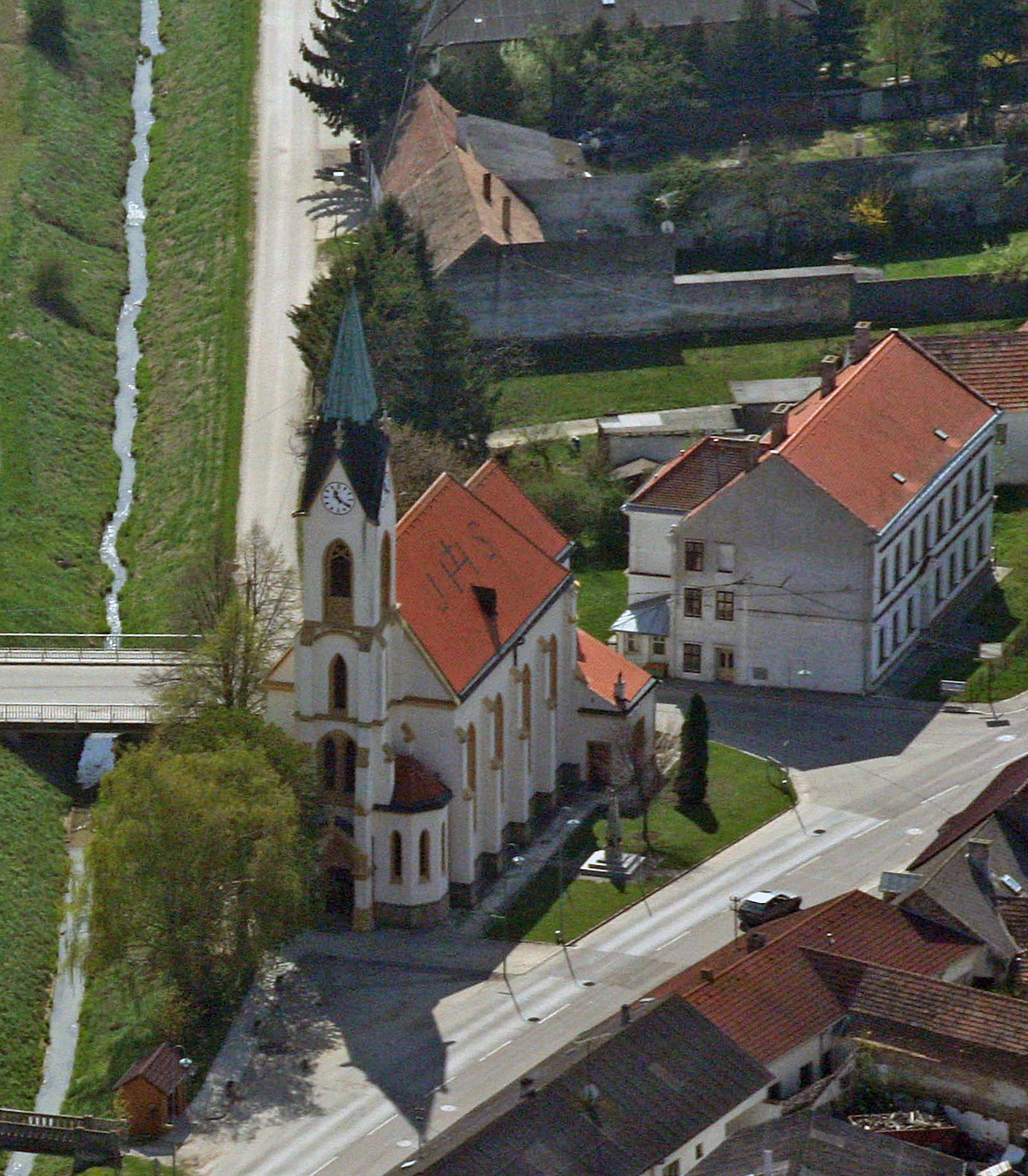
Siebenhirten, school and church

== Notable people ==
- Wilhelm Bernatzik (1853–1906), landscape painter from Austria-Hungary
- Laura Rappoldi (1853–1925), pianist from Austria-Hungary
- Oswald Kabasta (1896–1946), conductor
- Alfred Šramek (1951–2016), operatic bass and bass-baritone
- Willy Puchner, (born 1952), photographer
- Josef Kleindienst (born 1963), property developer

=== Sports ===
- Helmut Graf (born 1963), football player and manager
- Mario Hieblinger (born 1977), football player
- Katrin Engel (born 1984), handball player
