= The World (archipelago) =

Artificial archipelago in Dubai, UAE

The World Islands (Dubai)
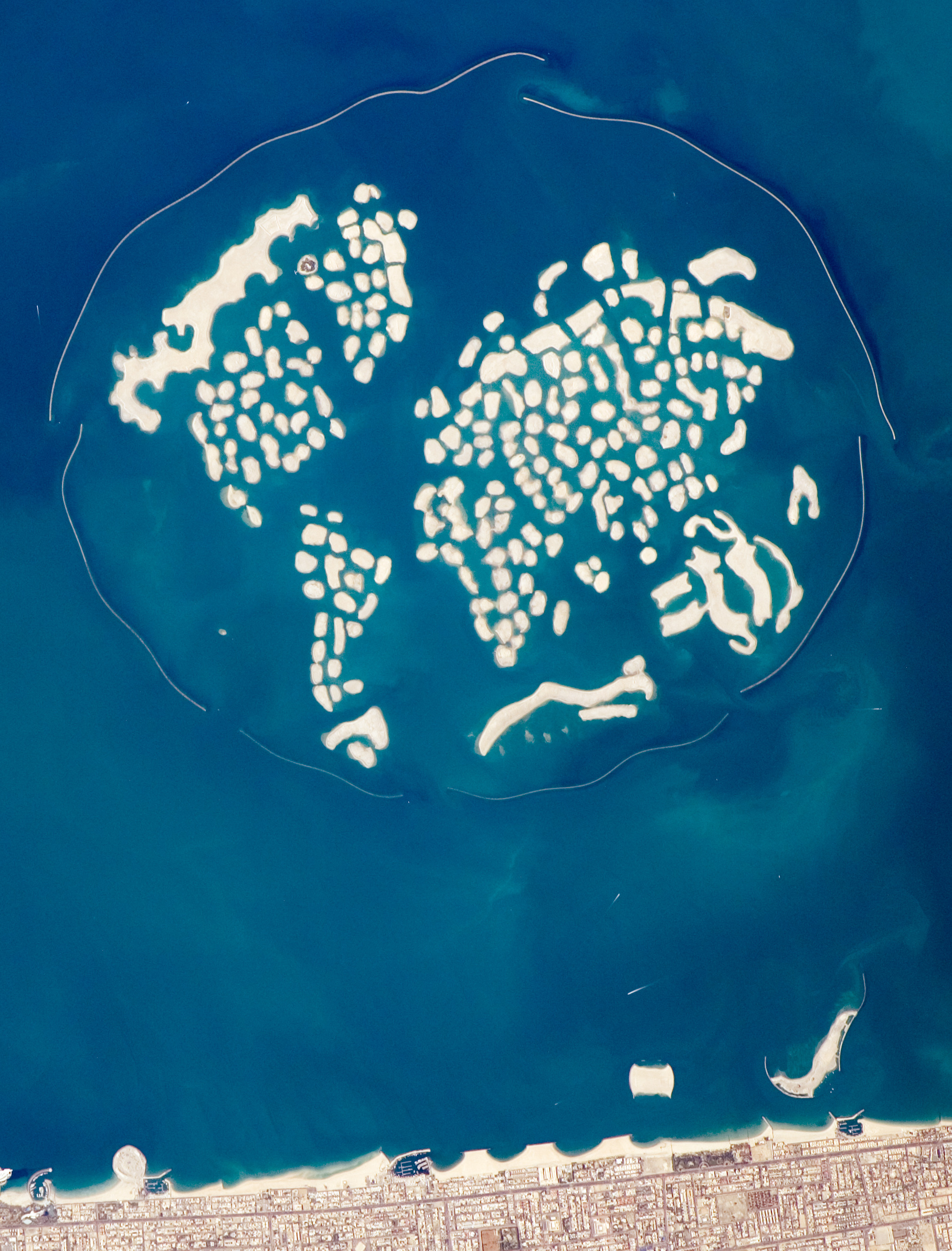
- View of the World in 2010

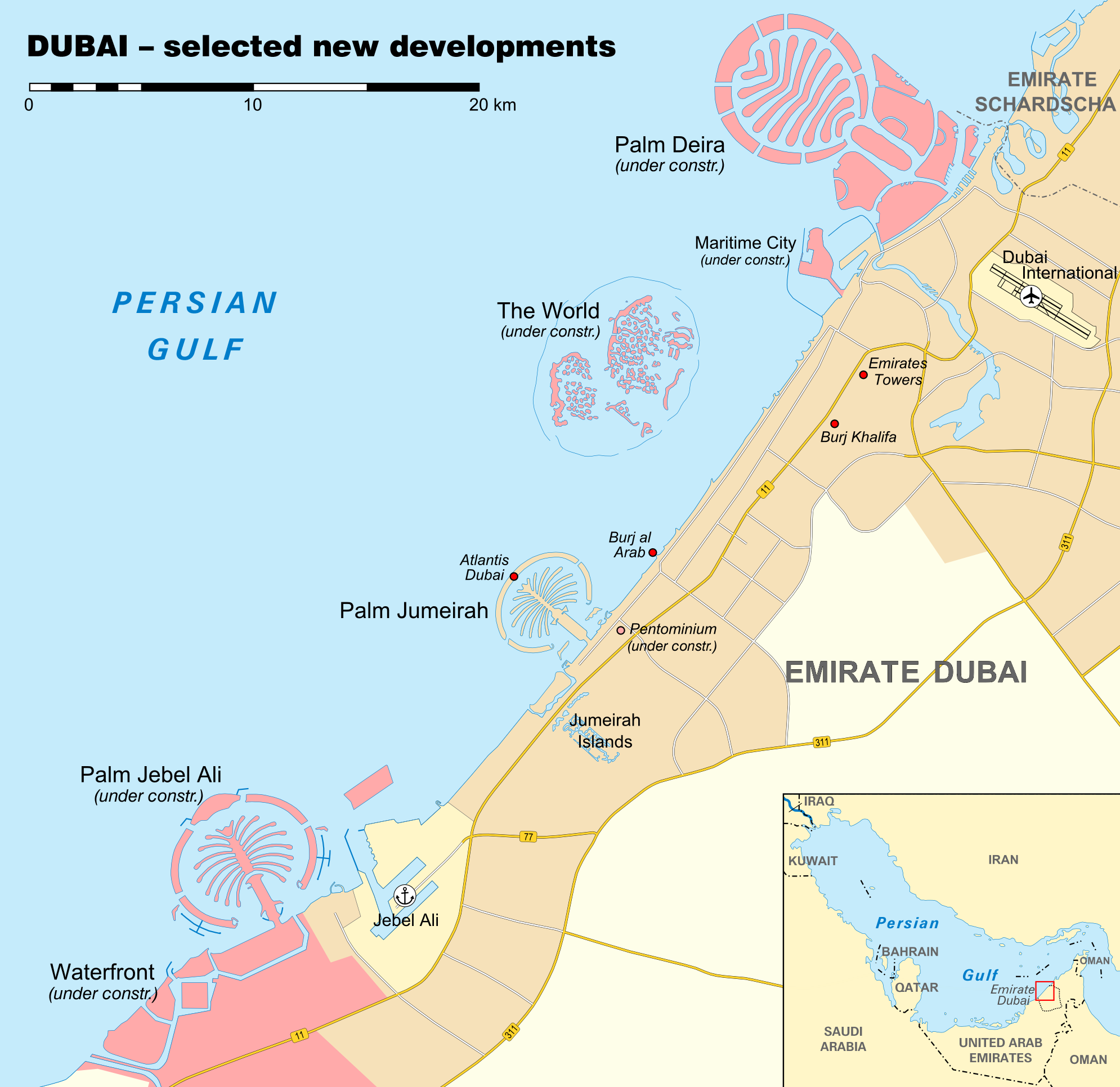

Geography
- Location: United Arab Emirates
- Coordinates: 25°13′00″N 55°10′00″E
- Archipelago: The World
- Length: 9 km (5.6 mi)
- Width: 6 km (3.7 mi)

Administration
- United Arab Emirates

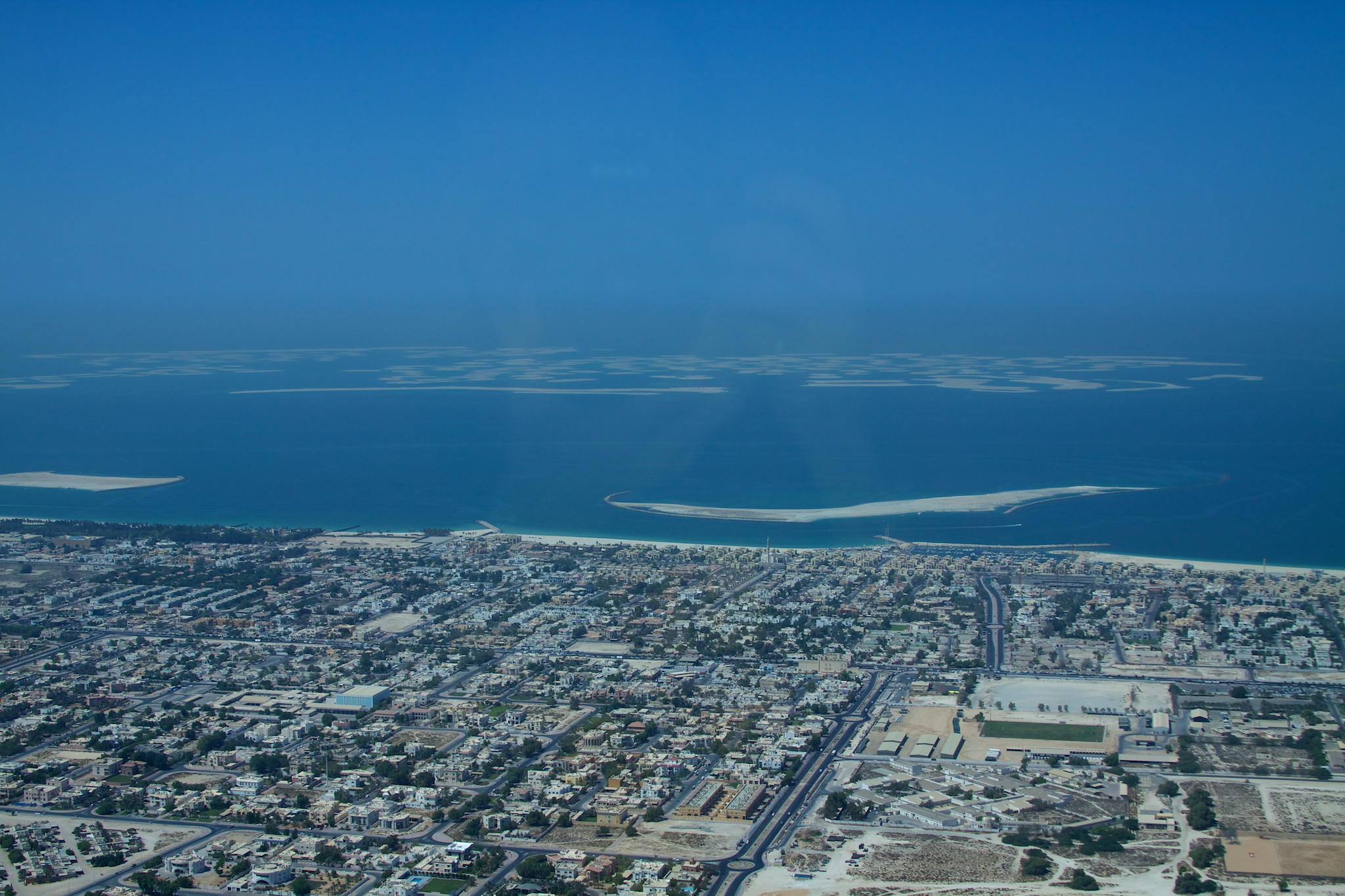
View of The World from the Burj Khalifa

The development's logo

The World Islands (Arabic: جزر العالم, romanized: Juzur al-Ālam) are an archipelago of small artificial islands constructed in the shape of a world map, located in the Persian Gulf, off the coast of Dubai, United Arab Emirates. The World Islands are composed mainly of sand dredged from Dubai's shallow coastal waters and are one of several artificial island developments in the emirate. The World's developer is Nakheel Properties. Construction was done by two Dutch joint-venture specialist companies, Van Oord and Boskalis, who also created the Palm Jumeirah.

Construction of the 300 islands began in 2003, before being halted due to the 2008 financial crisis. Though 60% of the islands were sold to private contractors in 2008, development on most of the project had not started. As of July 2012, Lebanon Island was completed and was the only island that had so far been developed commercially, being used for private corporate events and public parties. As of late 2013, only two of the islands had been developed. In January 2014, Kleindienst Group announced the launch of "the Heart of Europe" project. By February 2014, JK Properties, one of Kleindienst Group's brands, announced that the project was "well underway". The first of these series of islands will be Europe, Sweden, and Germany, with development led by Kleindienst Group.

== The World Project ==
Islands in the project range from 1.4 to 4.2 hectares (3.5 to 10.4 acres) in area. Distances between islands average 100 metres (110 yd); they are constructed from 321 million cubic metres of sand and 386 million tons of rock. Designed by Creative Kingdom Dubai, the development is an area that covers 6 by 9 kilometres (3.2 by 4.9 nmi) and is surrounded by an oval-shaped breakwater island. Roughly 232 km (144 mi) of shoreline has been created. The World's overall development costs were estimated at $13 billion CAD in 2005.

The archipelago consists of seven sets of islands, representing the continents of Europe, Africa, Asia, North America, South America, Antarctica, and Oceania. Each artificial island is named after its representative country, landmark, or region, such as France, California, Rio de Janeiro, Mount Everest, Australia, New Mexico, Upernavik, Buenos Aires, New York, Mexico, Saint Petersburg, São Paulo, and India.

== History ==
The project was unveiled in May 2003 by Al Maktoum, and dredging began four months later. By January 2008, 60% of the islands were sold, with 20 being bought in the first four months of 2007. On 10 January 2008, the final stone on the breakwater was laid, completing development of the archipelago. As of July 2012, a second island, the Lebanon Island (1.5 hectares, or 3.7 acres and 482.21 metres of perimeter) was developed and was 'the only island that has so far been developed commercially, is used for private corporate events and public parties'.

=== Difficulties ===
The Times reported in September 2009 reported that work on the World had been suspended due to the effects of the 2008 financial crisis. Nakheel denied 2010 reports that the islands were sinking into the sea as wholly inaccurate. Despite the denial, The Daily Telegraph reported in January 2011 that an independent company, Penguin Marine, provided verification on the erosion of the islands and the silting of the passageways between the islands. Due to financial and technical problems, Penguin Marine, contracted to provide transportation to the archipelago, attempted to get out of the annual fees of $1.6 million paid to Nakheel properties.

Until early 2012, only one of the islands had been occupied by a building (a show home), and commercial or residential properties were not being constructed on any of the other islands. Property prices in the Emirates fell 58% from their peak in the fourth quarter of 2008.

The world economic recovery from the Great Recession resulted in a rebound for the Dubai real estate market: it was reported that "residential prices [in Dubai] rose by 17.9% from August 2012 to 2013, while rents soared by 14.9% in the same period".

=== Purchase and development plans ===
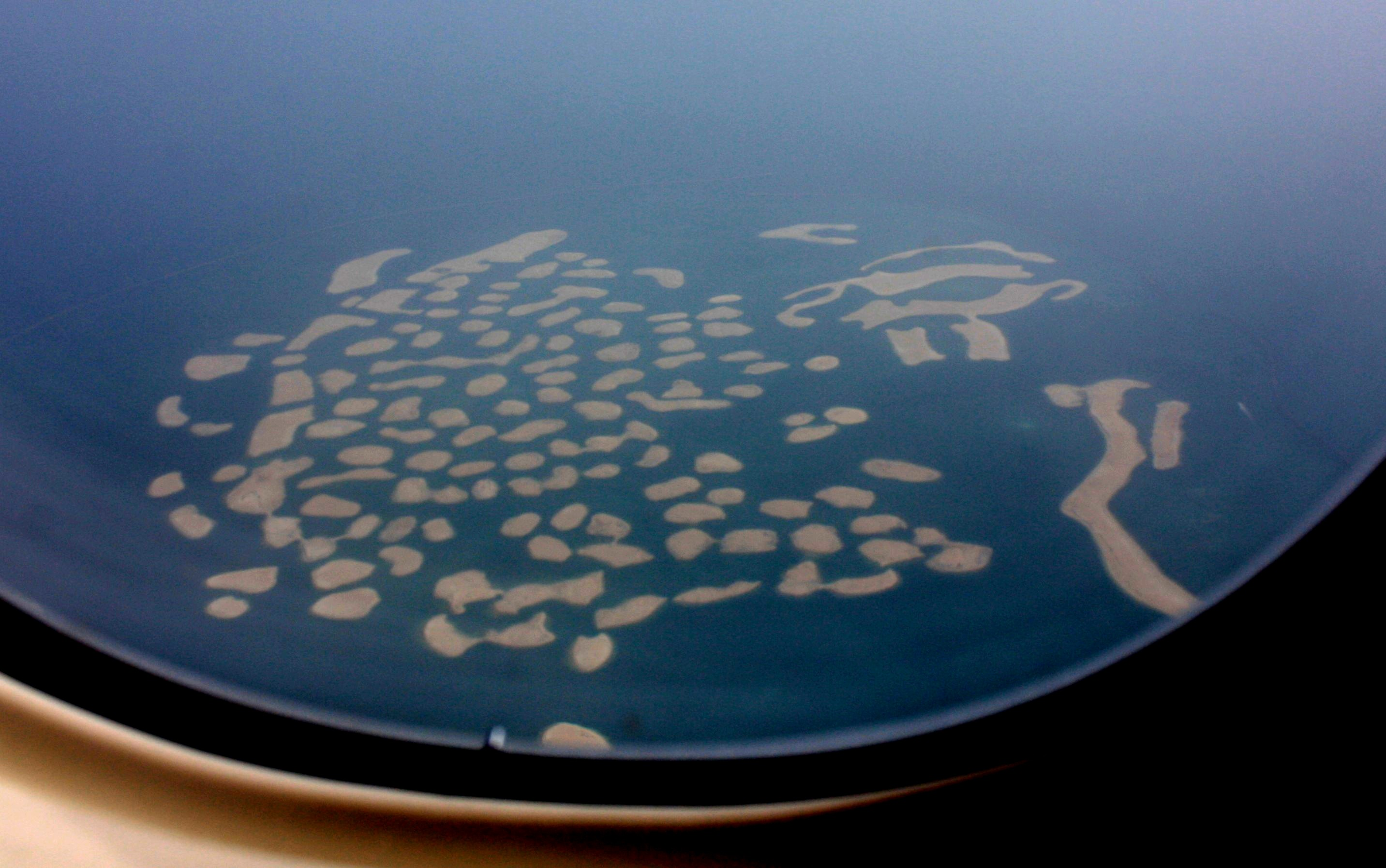
The World 2010 (aerial view)

The World was supposed to be served by four major transportation hubs linked by waterways. Land parcels were supposedly zoned for various uses: estate, mid-density, high density, resorts, and commercial.

The plan was for utilities to be routed underwater, with pumping stations at each of the hubs pumping fresh water to the islands. Power was to be supplied by the Dubai grid and distributed through underwater cables. However, as of May 2025, no cables had been laid, and developers had to provide their own power using diesel generators. Wastewater and refuse systems are an individual concern for each island.

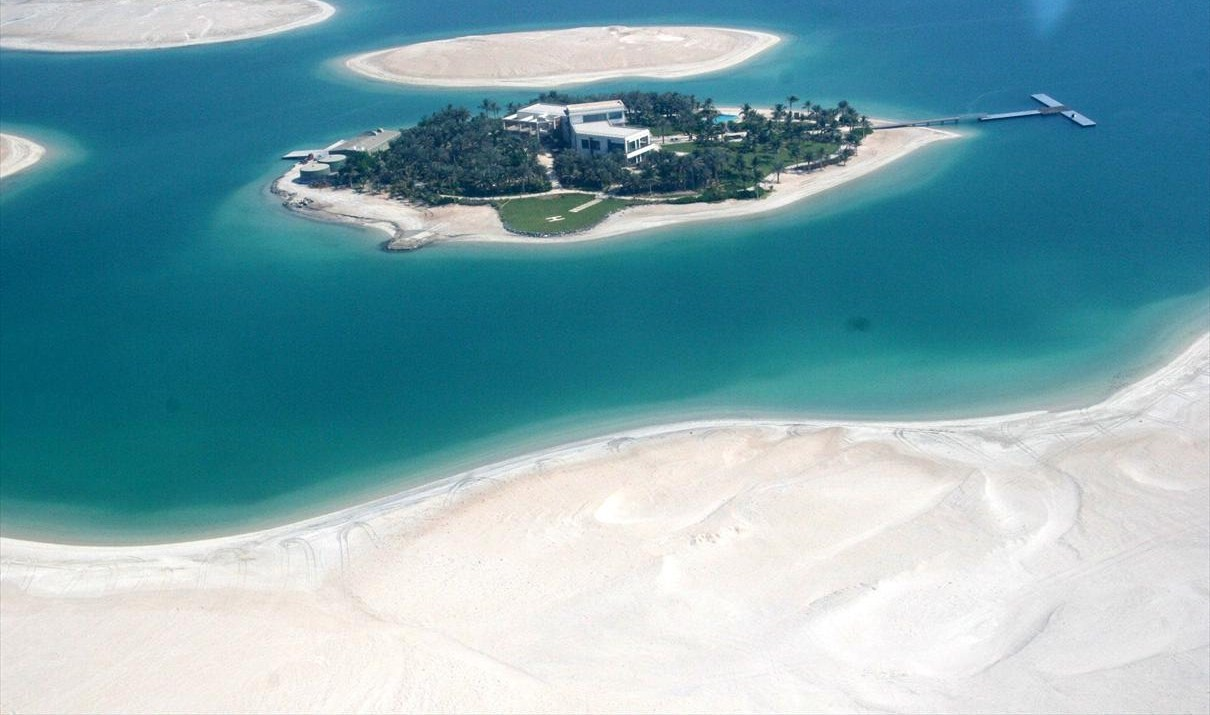
A show house island for prospective buyers

Nakheel Group is itself further developing a resort named Coral Island, covering over 20 islands that make up the North American part of the World. The low-rise development will include a marina and hotel village. The second largest confirmed development is the purchase of 14 islands that make up Australia and New Zealand by Investment Dar of Kuwait. The islands are being developed as a resort named OQYANA.

The Irish business consortium Larionovo had plans to develop the Ireland island into an Irish-themed resort. The plans included a large internal marina, apartments and villas, a gym, hotel, and an Irish-themed pub. In July 2007, it was announced that the island would feature a recreation of Northern Ireland's Giant's Causeway. However, on 25 November 2008, a provisional liquidator was appointed for Larionovo. As of October 2022, this has not happened.

In April 2008, Salya Corporation announced that it had acquired the islands of Finland and Brunei and planned to develop them into fashion-themed resorts. Salya spent about Dh800 million (US$218 million) to purchase the islands and plans to spend a further Dh2.4 billion (US$654 million) on development. Brunei Island will be turned into a Fashion TV resort and Finland Island into a fashion community called FTV palace.

Safi Qurashi at the head of Premier, and his business partner Mustafa Nagri, paid an estimated US$64 million for the 4.5-hectare (11-acre) piece of land; he was later convicted for non-payment of cheques and sentenced to seven years in jail. However, on appeal, he was later found not guilty and released from prison in July 2012, when he was declared innocent of two of the three charges.

Josef Kleindienst and his firm JK Properties are developing the Heart of Europe, a collection of seven islands (Germany, Netherlands, Sweden, Ukraine, Main Europe, Switzerland, and Monaco) in the European section of the World, into an island luxury resort. It is meant to create a fully immersive European experience, with outdoor snow and stores accepting only the Euro as a currency. It was set to open in 2020 but was delayed by the COVID-19 pandemic.

In June 2020, a street called Raining Street was being built as part of the Heart of Europe project, with plans to create artificial rainfall once the outdoor temperature exceeds 27 degrees Celsius, with the objective to make a close copy of southern European climate.

In December 2022, it was announced that the first hotel within the project, Cote d'Azur Monaco, had opened.

== Timeline of construction ==
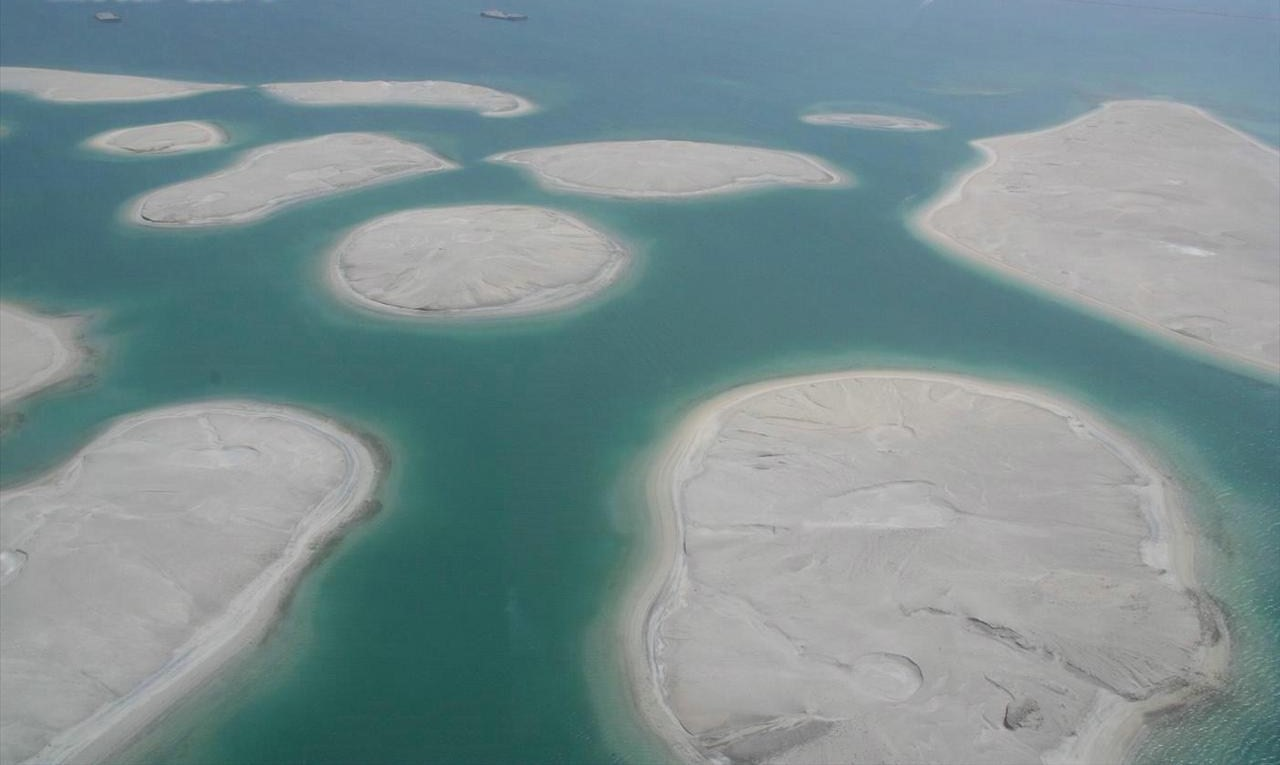
Undeveloped islands on 1 May 2007

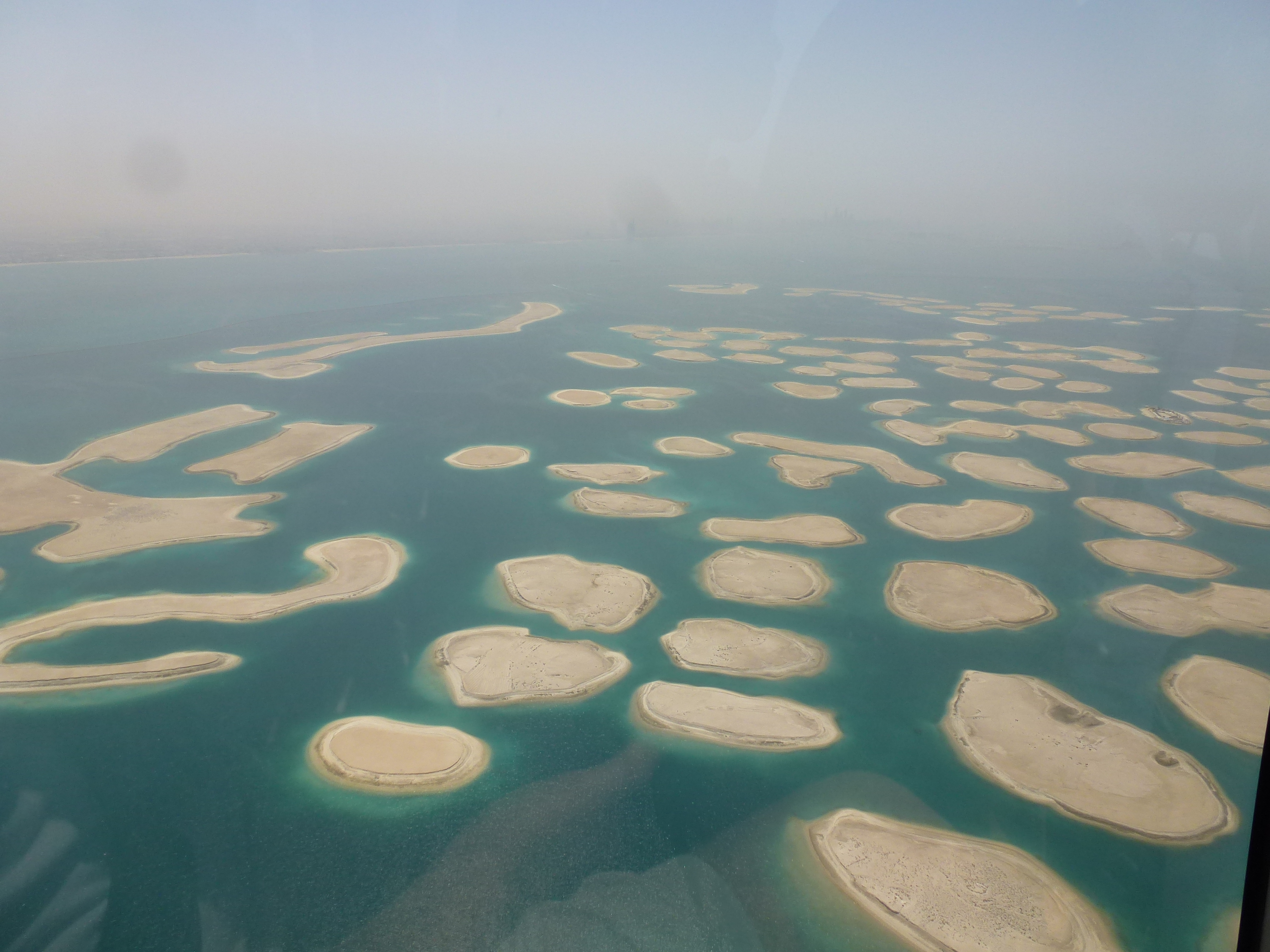
Undeveloped islands on 11 April 2015

- May 2003: The World development was announced by Nakheel, total completion scheduled for 2008. It was initially to have 200 islands and an area of 5,600,000 square metres (60,000,000 sq ft).
- February 2004: It was announced that the World would comprise 260 islands, and its area would be 6 km by 9 km, with an area of 23–83,613 square metres (250–900,000 sq ft) for each island, with 50–100 m (160–330 ft) of water between each island.
- August 2004: It was announced that land reclamation would cost AED 7.3 billion ($2 billion).
- April 2005: Sand dredging 55 percent complete, 88 islands completed.
- 30 March 2006: Richard Branson appeared at a media conference on the Great Britain island. However, this was to announce direct London-to-Dubai flights by Virgin Atlantic and was not related to his investing in the project.
- December 2006: The World reclamation 90 percent complete.
- October 2007: Nakheel announced the sale of Ireland and Shanghai in October 2007.
- January 2008: The World breakwater is completed.
- 19 February 2008: Cinnovation Group acquired a 37,000-square-metre (400,000 sq ft) island as part of a project valued at US$200 million. Guest and residential villas and a hospitality complex are planned.

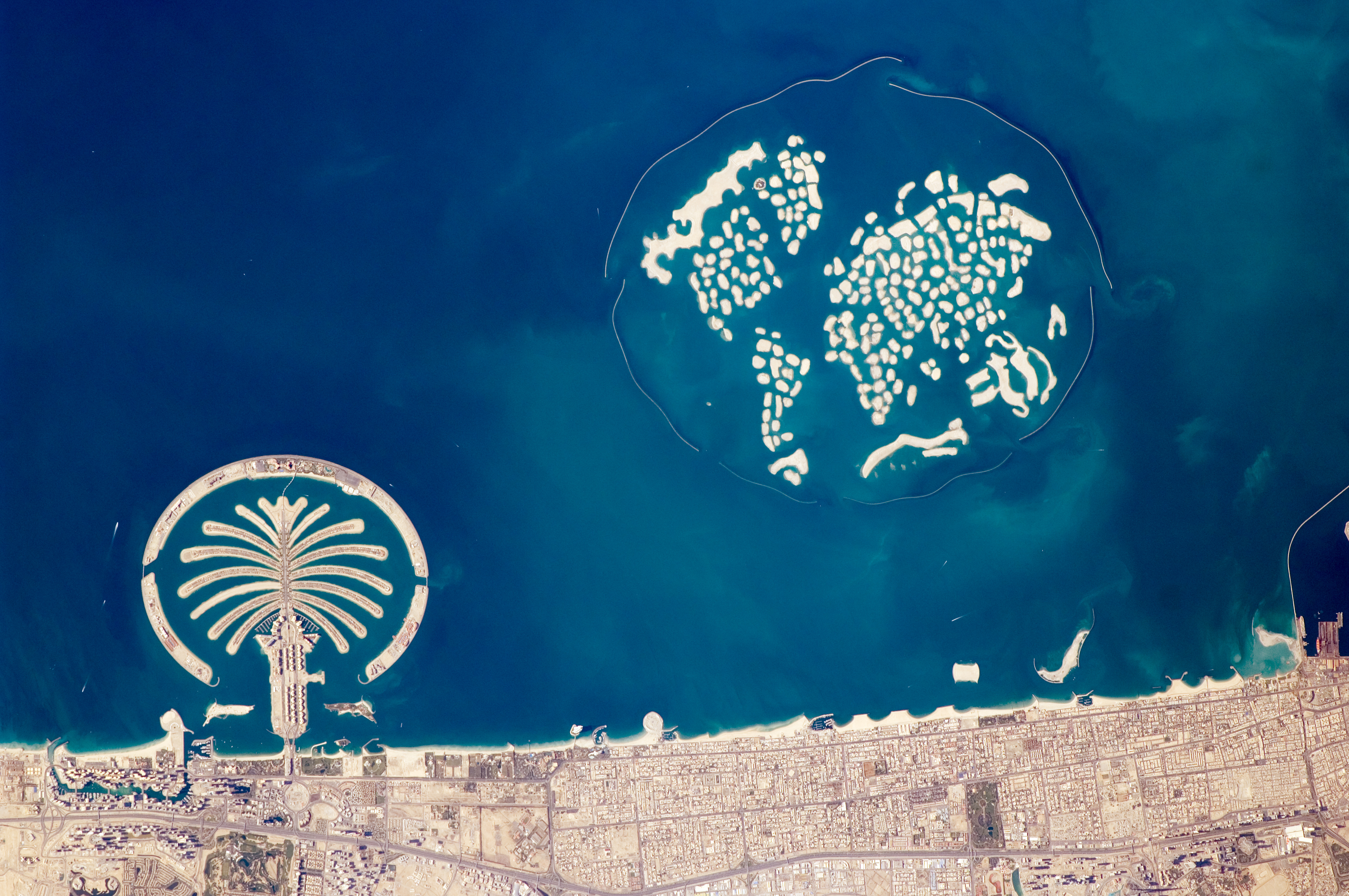
Taken from the International Space Station in 2010

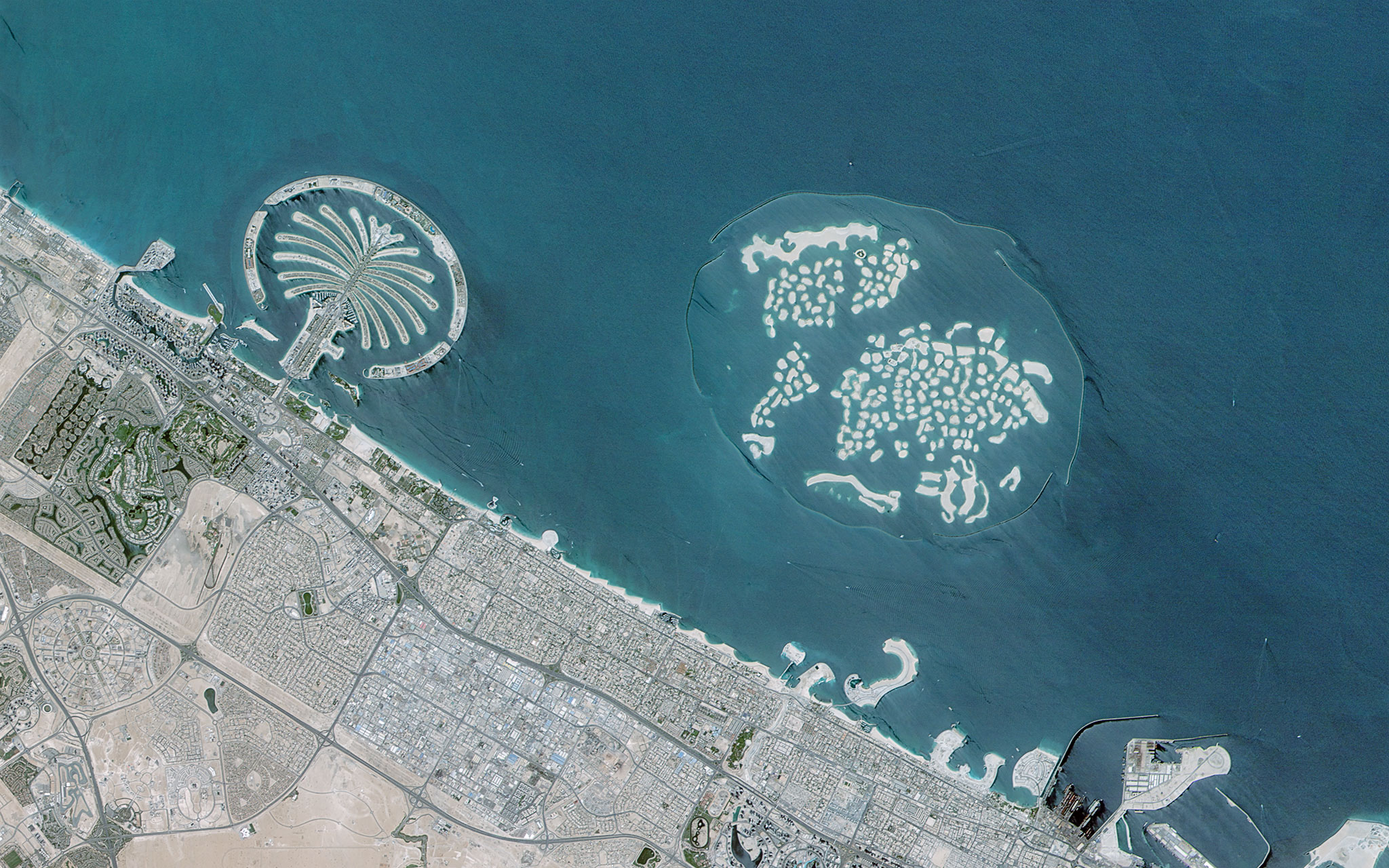
Taken from the Hodoyoshi-1 satellite in 2016

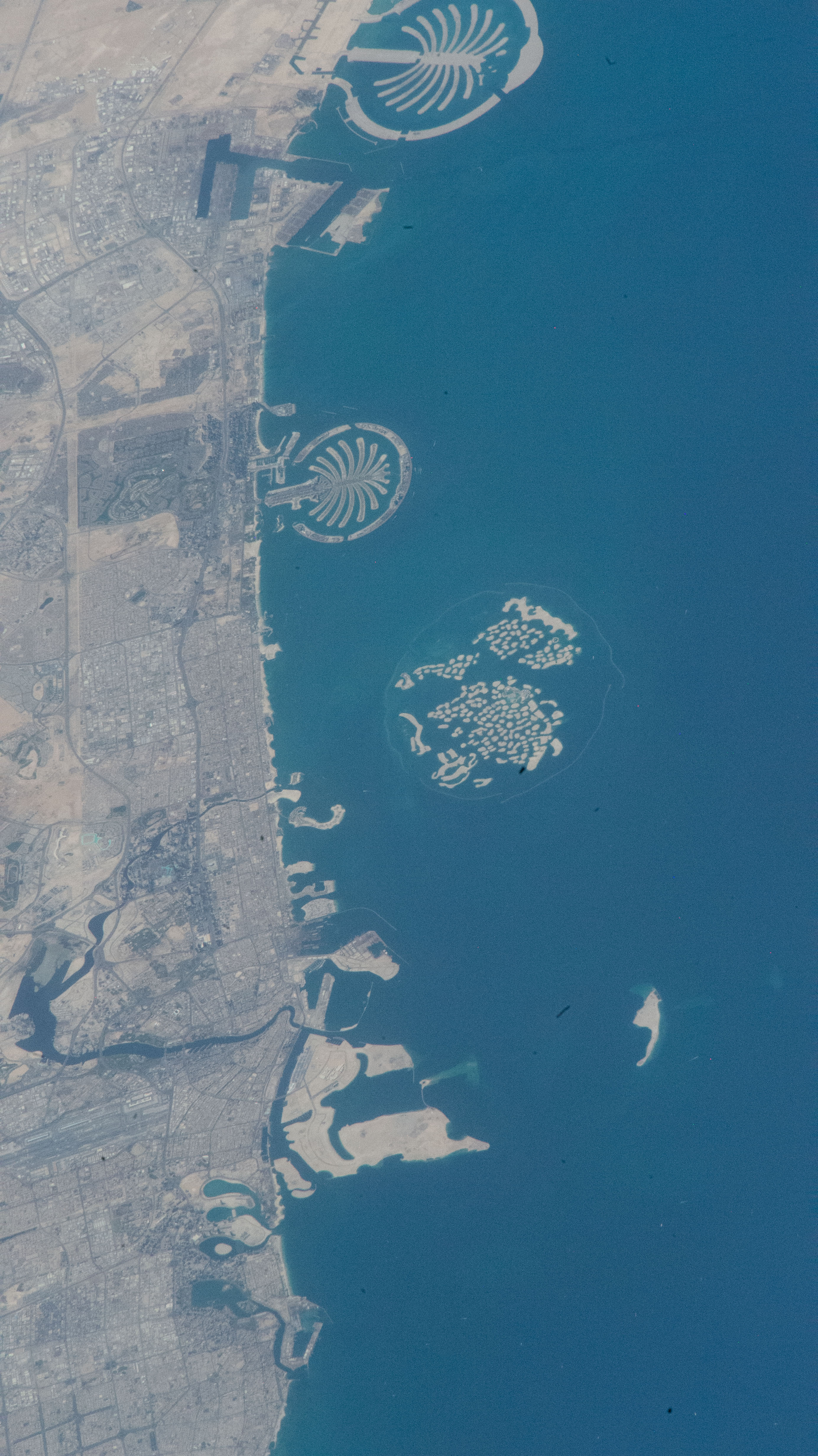
Taken from the International Space Station in 2022

- 25 February 2008: Dubai Multi Commodities Centre announced that it will establish a 6,000-square-metre (65,000 sq ft) pearling and marine entertainment center in association with Paspaley Pearling Corporation. It will be located on an island in the Antarctic region of the World.
- September 2008: Dubai's Limitless announced plans to develop a US$161 million wellness resort on an island in "Siberia". Pearl Dubai paid US$27.2 million for a 150,000-square-metre (1,600,000 sq ft) island nearby.
- 28 December 2008: Turkey Island was bought by MNG Holding in June 2008 for US$19 million.
- 28 December 2008: China's Zhongzhou International announced that it will be developing a hotel resort on Shanghai island.
- 28 December 2008: Nakheel said 70 percent of the World had been sold.
- October 2009: An Emirates Business report on 13 October 2009 stated that two islands were sold in July and August 2009.
- December 2009: Dubai-based Kleindienst Group said they would start construction of the Heart of Europe in early 2010. Islands include Austria, Germany, Netherlands, Ukraine, Sweden, and Switzerland.
- January 2010: On 28 January 2010, Emirates Business reported that Major Trade had started development of their projects on an island in the Greenland area, a villa and hotel resort.
- 23 February 2010: Kleindienst Group started work on the Germany island of the World.
- 17 July 2012: The Royal Island Beach Club opened on Lebanon Island.
- 6 May 2013: Nakheel announced that an out-of-court settlement had been reached between itself and Kleindienst Group, allowing construction on "The Heart of Europe" to resume.
- 10 June 2013: Construction began on "Taiwan".
- 2 July 2013: Nakheel announced that settlements "with São Paulo Development Ltd for São Paulo Island and a GCC investor for the purchase of Nord Island", totaling "AED 185 million", along with the earlier settlement with Kleindienst Group (valued at AED 622 million), have "put The World back on the map".

The World islands map, annotated with existing developments

- 10 December 2013: Nakheel announced plans to connect the islands with a road.
- January 2014: Kleindienst Group's JK Properties announced that "work has commenced on The Heart of Europe".
- January 2014: Website "The Heart of Europe" publishes monthly construction updates for the project.
- February 2014: JK Properties announced that the "Heart of Europe" islands construction is "well underway".
- 7 December 2016: The Heart of Europe project makes major progress when the Dubai-based company JK Bauen, part of the Kleindienst Group, appointed Chinese-based companies Wuchang Ship Building Industry Group and Sino Great Wall International Engineering in a joint venture to develop facilities on the six islands.
- January 2022: Anantara World Islands opens.

== See also ==
- List of developments of The World (archipelago)
- Palm Islands
- Dubai Waterfront
