= Paul Moravec =

American composer (born 1957)

Paul Moravec (born November 2, 1957) is an American composer and a university professor at Adelphi University on Long Island, New York and also a member of the composition department of the Mannes School of Music. Already a prolific composer, he has been described as a "new tonalist." He is best known for his work Tempest Fantasy, which received the 2004 Pulitzer Prize for Music. Among his compositions are the operas The Letter (2009) and The Shining (2016).

== Biography ==
Moravec was born in Buffalo, New York, and subsequently attended the Lawrenceville School, graduating in 1975. He received his B.A. in composition from Harvard University in 1980; while there, he performed with the Harvard-Radcliffe Collegium Musicum, one of the Holden Choirs. He won the Prix de Rome and studied at the American Academy in Rome after graduating. He then received the Master of Music (1982) and Doctor of Musical Arts (1987) in composition, both from Columbia University.

Moravec has taught at Dartmouth College (1987–96) and Hunter College (1997–98). He suffered from clinically diagnosed depression that worsened during the time immediately surrounding his departure from Dartmouth College, and underwent electroshock therapy. He is currently a university professor in the music department at Adelphi University, He also teaches composition at the Mannes School of Music, contributing to what The New York Times has called a "renaissance" in a college that went through academic and financial difficulties in the 1990s.

In 2004, Moravec received the Pulitzer Prize for Music for his work Tempest Fantasy. This prestigious award raised Moravec's profile significantly, and he was appointed to several residencies. He was named the new honorary composer-member of the New York Composers Circle in September, 2006. He was also appointed the composer in residence for the 2007-2008 academic year at the Institute for Advanced Study in Princeton, New Jersey.

In addition to his Pulitzer Prize, Moravec has received a Composer Fellowship from the National Endowment for the Arts, a Rockefeller Foundation fellowship, and the Charles Ives Prize and Goddard Lieberson Awards in American Composition. He was elected to the American Philosophical Society in 2010.

He has been commissioned by such ensembles as the Dessoff Choirs, the Albany Symphony Orchestra, and the Harvard Glee Club.

== Musical style ==
Moravec has been placed into a group called "new tonalists" by the critic Terry Teachout, who describes them as composers who are "neither embarrassed nor paralyzed by tradition. Rather they accept it as a given." Thus, according to this analysis, his style is primarily tonal and neo-romantic. However, Moravec himself asserts:

The term ‘new tonalist’ is a little outdated simply because of the passage of time[.] It had more relevance a few decades ago, when late modernism was dying or even dead. For my work, I regard the term only as a point of departure before considering each composition on a case-by-case basis. As a composer, I try always to make beautiful things, and I use whatever techniques and materials are useful for the particular composition at hand[.] Some of those materials are atonal or nontonal, but the overall harmonic context of my music derives from the tonal tradition, which after all is the lingua franca of Western music — essentially, Monteverdi to the Beatles and beyond.

Critic Jens F. Laurson described Moravec's Pulitzer Prize-winning Tempest Fantasy as "remarkably accessible music. Picturesque, conventionally beautiful at times, but without pandering to the ears’ lowest harmonic expectations. [It is] music that works with all the traditional tools from the composer’s workshop[,] which have changed surprisingly little since Bach - but Moravec uses them to create music anew." He named Federico Mompou, Claude Debussy, Paul Hindemith, Francis Poulenc, and Elliott Carter as clear musical influences in Moravec's music. He also noted a clear disparity between Moravec's music and that of minimalist composers Steve Reich, Philip Glass, and John Adams.

Critic Victor Carr Jr. characterizes Moravec's musical language as "generally tonal--and although it's not consistently melodic, it's always accessible. More than that, it's highly engrossing[.]"

== Musical works ==
His best-known pieces include the Pulitzer-winning, Shakespeare-inspired Tempest Fantasy, a 30-minute chamber work scored for clarinet, violin, cello, and piano, which was premiered on May 2, 2003, at the Morgan Library in New York City by David Krakauer and Trio Solisti, for whom it was written; Northern Lights Electric, a 1994 work that combines a musical illustration of the Northern Lights with a musical depiction of electric light; and the 1998 cantata Fire/Ice/Air, which contrasts the journeys of Captain Robert Falcon Scott, on his expedition to the Antarctic, and Charles Lindbergh, on his trans-Atlantic flight. An oratorio, Blizzard Voices, about the Schoolhouse Blizzard of 1888, was commissioned by Opera Omaha and was premiered there in September 2008. He collaborated with Terry Teachout on The Letter, an opera based on the 1927 play by W. Somerset Maugham that was premiered in 2009 by the Santa Fe Opera.

== See also ==
- Joseph H. Bearns Prize
