= Tempest Fantasy =

Music by Paul Moravec

Tempest Fantasy is a 2003 chamber music composition in five movements for cello, clarinet, violin, and piano by the American composer Paul Moravec. The piece is dedicated to clarinetist David Krakauer and the piano trio Trio Solisti, who premiered the work May 2, 2003 at Morgan Library & Museum in New York City. The title of the work comes from the play The Tempest by William Shakespeare. The work won the 2004 Pulitzer Prize for Music.

== Composition ==
=== Structure ===
Tempest Fantasy has a duration of approximately thirty minutes and is composed in five movements:

1. Ariel
2. Prospero
3. Caliban
4. Sweet Airs
5. Fantasia

=== Style and inspiration ===
Moravec commented on the composition in the program notes for the work, saying:

Tempest Fantasy is a musical meditation on various characters, moods, situations, and lines of text from my favorite Shakespeare play, The Tempest. Rather than trying to depict these elements in programmatic terms, the music simply uses them as points of departure for flights of purely musical fancy.

The first three movements spring from the nature and selected speeches of the three eponymous individuals. The fourth movement begins from Caliban's uncharacteristically elegant speech from Act III, scene 2: "Be not afeard: the isle is full of noises, Sounds and sweet airs, that give delight, and hurt not."

The fifth movement is the most "fantastic" flight of all, elaborating on the numerous musical strands of the previous movements and drawing them all together into a convivial finale.

Moravec has also suggested that the piece was an allegory for his own struggle with depression, commenting: "Coming back from depression, I identified with Prospero and his melancholy and his downcast state. Through the power of imagination he improves his condition, and so that’s what I did as a composer."
