= Rudolf Gamsjäger =

Austrian opera administrator (1909–1985)

Rudolf Gamsjäger (23 March 1909 in Vienna, Austria – 28 January 1985 in Vienna, Austria), was an Austrian opera administrator. He served as general director of the Vienna State Opera from 1972 to 1976.

Gamsjäger's curriculum vitae includes work as a chemist, music manager, general secretary of Gesellschaft der Musikfreunde, president of Musikalischen Jugend Österreichs (Musical Youth of Austria) and Jeunesses Musicales International.
