= Mozart Boys' Choir =

The Mozart Boys' Choir (also known as "The Mozart Boys' Choir of Vienna" or "The Mozart Vienna Boys' Choir"; German: Mozart Knabenchor Wien) is an Austrian boys' choir founded in 1956 to commemorate the 200th birth anniversary of Wolfgang Amadeus Mozart. Originally it was named Mozart Sängerknaben, and it is now one of the most famous choirs in Europe, gaining recognition internationally.

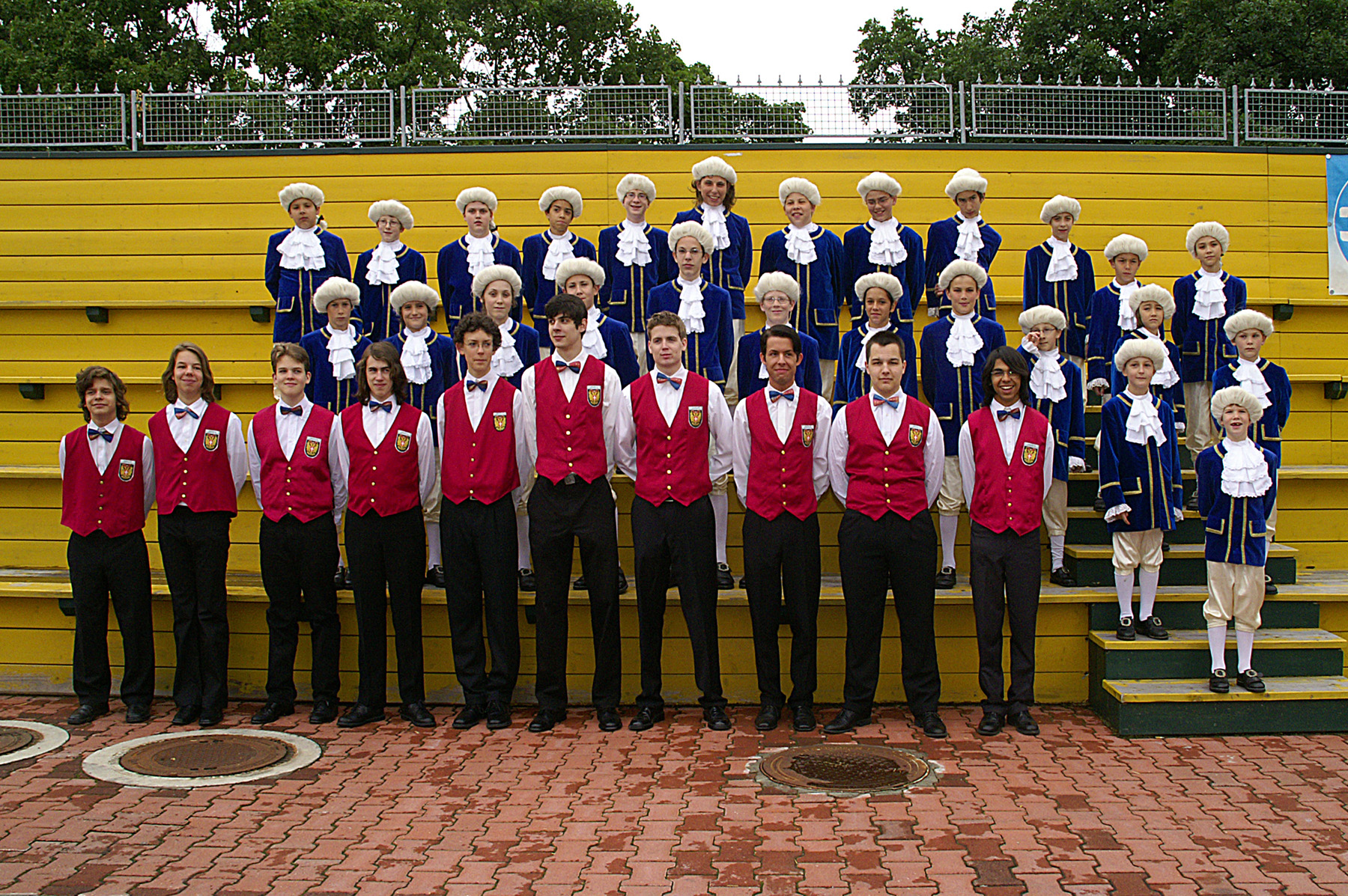
Mozart Boys' Choir Wien in uniform

== History ==
In 1956, to mark the 200th anniversary of Mozart's birthday, Prof. Erich Schwartzbauer founded "The Mozart Boys' Choir," which was directed primarily to perform works by Mozart and Viennese traditional music. Unlike the Vienna Boys' Choir, the boys in Mozart's choir do not live in a boarding school; they are allowed to go home after musical instruction and attend a school of their choice in their own neighborhood. Although the members of the choir come together only once a week for rehearsals and performances, the choir has achieved high standards of quality. In 1995, the community ceased activities due to the death of its founder, and the choir disappeared. Then, given some legal issues that were not properly resolved, the original name of "Mozart Sängerknaben" could not be used anymore, so the musical director of the institution, Peter Lang, took over the responsibility and reorganized the choristers under the new name of "Amadeus Boys' Choir of Vienna" in collaboration with parents. In 2006, coinciding with the 250th anniversary of the birth of Mozart, the choir celebrated obtaining its name back, and it is now known again as the Mozart Boys' Choir of Vienna, and it can be clearly distinguished by its 18th-century knight costume uniform.

== Repertoire ==
Mozart's compositions have a special place in the choir's selection, but it also comprises other composers from the classical period such as Joseph Haydn and Franz Peter Schubert. Audiences are delighted with the extraordinary performances of popular Austrian and German songs and Johann Strauss waltzes and polkas as well. The boys are also trained to perform works by contemporary composers to make them available to their fans.

== Concerts and tours ==
Choir performances are given in a wide range of venues, not only in Vienna but around the world as well. Choirboys have trodden stages as important as the Vienna State Opera, the Vienna Volksoper, the Musikverein's golden hall, and other great theaters around the world. They sing at private events or in charming soirées at the Vienna Palais, sharing their fine art with guests.

== Featured participations ==
The Mozart Boys' Choir has had the opportunity to sing together with the best orchestras of Vienna, like the Vienna Philharmonic, the Vienna Symphonic and the Radio Symphony Orchestra, all of them under the baton of famous conductors. Mozart choristers have also taken part in Christmas Concerts, Austrian films and TV commercials.
