= The Letter (opera) =

Opera of Paul Moravec, 2009

The Letter is an opera by composer Paul Moravec and librettist Terry Teachout. It was commissioned by the Santa Fe Opera and was premiered there on 25 July 2009.

The opera is based on The Letter, a 1927 play adapted by W. Somerset Maugham from one of his short stories. The play has been filmed twice. The first version, called The Letter, was made in 1929 and starred Jeanne Eagels. The better-known 1940 version, also called The Letter, starred Bette Davis and Herbert Marshall and was directed by William Wyler.

The inspiration for Maugham's story and his subsequent play came from a real-life event which took place in Kuala Lumpur in Malaya in April 1911.

== Development of the opera ==
=== The collaboration ===
Both Moravec and Teachout made their operatic debuts with The Letter. Teachout began writing the libretto in November 2006 and started posting an ongoing account of the opera's genesis and development on his blog, About Last Night, when the commission was announced by the Santa Fe Opera on May 9, 2007. He describes it as "a cross between a verismo opera like Tosca and a film noir like Double Indemnity or Out of the Past. We don't want The Letter to sound old-fashioned—Paul's musical language is in no way derivative of Verdi or Puccini—but we do want it to move fast and hit hard."

Later Teachout described the challenges to adapting a literary work into a new medium, in this case an opera: "Every great opera based on a literary source involves an imaginative transformation of the original, one that typically goes far beyond the setting of the old words to new music."

In May 2008 Moravec and Teachout discussed the opera at a press conference held in Santa Fe. Moravec called it “an opera noir, a music drama about ordinary people who make a few mistakes and suddenly find themselves swept into very deep emotional water. It combines the aesthetic of American verismo with dream-like qualities often characteristic of a psychological drama. We intend it to be as fast-moving and hard-hitting as a film noir from the ’40s.”

Teachout added that their goal was “to write a work that’s firmly rooted in traditional operatic practice—one that will make dramatic sense to mainstream audiences.” By January 2009, as reported in the January 5th blog, both the opera's libretto and the orchestral score had been finalized and it was ready to go to the publisher.

On July 14, Teachout began "livetweeting" from rehearsals for The Letter on his Twitter page. He posted about The Letter there and on his blog between then and the opera's premiere.

== Production history ==
The premiere featured soprano Patricia Racette and baritone Anthony Michaels-Moore (who appeared in Santa Fe's 2008 Falstaff). The two appeared together in the Metropolitan Opera's new 2008 production of Peter Grimes. The production was directed by British theatre and opera director, Jonathan Kent, whose work has been seen in Santa Fe several times (notably in the 2008 The Marriage of Figaro) and conducted by Patrick Summers of Houston Grand Opera. Hildegard Bechtler designed the sets. The costumes were designed by the well-known fashion designer Tom Ford, who made his debut as a stage designer with this production. Lighting design was by Duane Schuler, who regularly works at the Santa Fe Opera.

== Roles ==
Role	Voice type	Cast of the premiere production 25 July 2009 (Conductor: Patrick Summers)
Leslie Crosbie, an Englishwoman living in Malaya	soprano	Patricia Racette
Robert Crosbie, Leslie's husband, the manager of a rubber plantation	baritone	Anthony Michaels-Moore
Howard Joyce, a Singapore lawyer	bass-baritone	James Maddalena
Geoff Hammond, the Crosbies' neighbor	tenor	Roger Honeywell
A Chinese Woman	mezzo-soprano	Mika Shigematsu
Ong Chi Seng, Joyce's confidential clerk	tenor	Rodell Rosel
John Withers, a colonial official	tenor	Keith Jameson
Head Man, of the plantation workers	tenor	Sung Eun Lee
First Clubman	tenor	Jason Slayden
Second Clubman	baritone	Kevin Ray
A Judge	bass	Lucas Harbour
A Guard	tenor	Andrew Stenson

== Synopsis ==
Place: Malaya
Time: Between the world wars

The opera is in eight scenes. It runs for approximately ninety-five minutes and plays without an intermission.

Scene 1: The Murder

The Crosbies' bungalow

Leslie Crosbie, a British expatriate who lives with her husband Robert on a rubber plantation in the jungles of Malaya, shoots and kills Geoff Hammond on the verandah of her bungalow.

Scene 2: The Confession

The same, two hours later

Following the arrival of Joyce, Withers, and her husband, Leslie claims that Hammond, a neighbor, had tried to rape her. They all leave for Singapore.

Scene 3: The Letter

Howard Joyce's law office in Singapore, two weeks later

Howard Joyce learns from Ong of the existence of a letter sent by Leslie to Hammond on the day of the murder, which suggests that she and Hammond had pre-arranged the meeting. The letter is in the possession of Hammond’s mistress, a Chinese woman who offers to sell Leslie the incriminating letter for ten thousand dollars on the eve of her murder trial.

Scene 4: The Interview

Leslie's jail cell, an hour later

Joyce visits Leslie in jail and confronts her with the existence of the letter. Eventually, she admits to having written it. Via a flashback, the events of the murder are played out between Leslie and Geoff. Jealous of his relationship with his Chinese mistress and angry that he intends to break off their relationship, she shoots him. Returning to the jail cell, she convinces Joyce to obtain the letter.

Scene 5: The Club

The Singapore club, late afternoon

The club members seem to be fully supportive of the distraught Robert. Without telling him of the amount demanded for the letter, Joyce explains to Robert that the letter exists and, if produced in court, it would implicate and convict Leslie. Robert agrees that it should be acquired, but is full of doubt about Leslie's innocence.

Scene 6: The Woman

Joyce's office, later that night

The Chinese woman arrives with the letter and, although initially reluctant to sell it, she relents and Joyce buys it.

Scene 7: The Verdict

A Singapore courtroom, the next day

Geoff appears to Leslie as the jury foreman; he declares her to be guilty. However, Leslie is acquitted.

Scene 8: The Truth

The bungalow, that same evening

Joyce and Withers arrive for dinner. Robert appears, somewhat drunk. When he finds out what really happened, he demands to see the letter but tells Leslie that he loves her in spite of what she has done. “With all my heart,” she replies, “I still love the man I killed!” Taking what appears to be the only course of action, she stabs herself.

== Critical reception ==
Critics generally found the opera entertaining, though some reviews questioned the emotional depth of the production and the technical intricacies of the score. There was general agreement that The Letter was "opera noir", a clear homage to the film noir of the 1940s and 1950s.

In Opera News Simon Williams wrote that The Letter "was intended to be an instantly accessible work with wide popular appeal. It may be just that. For a start, the opera is an improvement on the play, which is verbose, faultily structured and moralistic; instead, Teachout's terse libretto recaptures the stringent economy of the much finer story, also by Maugham, upon which the play is based." He praised the score as "richly orchestrated...it amplifies emotions, emphasizes confrontation and crisis and drives the action forward. But it also creates a dramatic world in which singing seems to be the only appropriate medium." Williams concluded by observing that the "warm response of the Santa Fe audience suggests the work may have legs."

In the Denver Post Kyle McMillan commented: "The piece, which runs an economical 100 minutes with no intermission, has virtually all the essential — and expected — ingredients, including style, humor and grit. The only thing missing, unfortunately, is heart." McMillan believed that the score's "unnatural leaps in pitch and non-intuitive phrasing" made it difficult for the audience to empathize with the opera's characters.

A highly positive review in the Santa Fe New Mexican by Craig Smith disagreed with criticism of the score while recognizing its technical challenges, calling the opera "exceptionally well-crafted and beautifully orchestrated, though far too thick for the singers' ease, especially in the brass." Smith praised the performers and production staff but thought the opera might be somewhat too brief: "I think they [composer Moravec and librettist Teachout] have mistaken brevity for intrinsic value and left one of opera's most vital components unrealized: Truly expressive arias for all the main characters, in which introspection welds dramatic truth with music that reaches the heart, not just the mind."

The Washington Post ran a harshly critical review by Anne Midgette, who maintained that the opera lacked real content: "'The Letter' is all form and little content...But in adhering to the rules of opera -- we must have arias and ensembles -- Moravec and librettist Teachout repeatedly show a tin ear for the exigencies of drama. The arias keep obtruding at inopportune moments to spell out things that don't need spelling out ('What have I done? I've killed him. He is gone forever'). They bring the action to a screeching halt." In his blog librettist Teachout linked to this "scorched earth pan" with a wry concession: "I can't say I enjoyed reading it, but I believe I can stand the heat. I ought to be able to: after all, I've been dishing it out for most of my professional life!"

A review in the Financial Times by George Loomis noted that the opera would be more readily identified with William Wyler's film starring Bette Davis than with Maugham's play, and that while Moravec was generous with his music, it never took over as it should in opera. The music was more akin to a film score, expanded in scope, but not in function.
