= Fallbach, Austria =

Fallbach
- Municipality
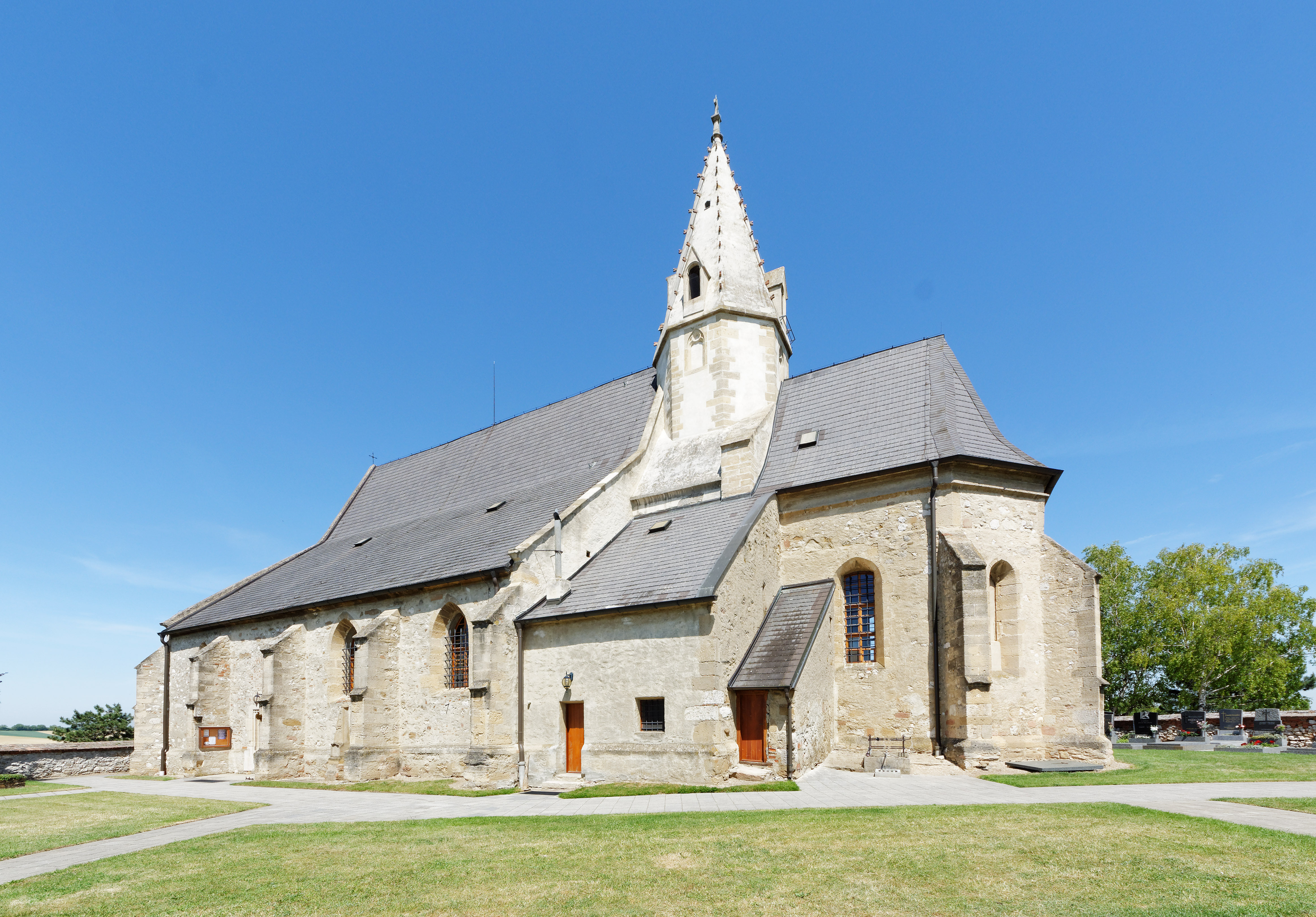
- Fallbach parish church

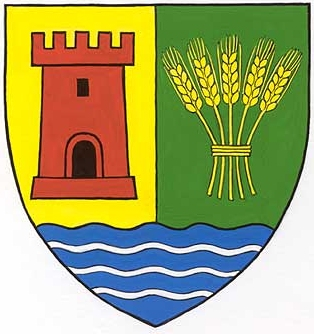
- Coat of arms

- Location within Austria
- Coordinates: 48°39′N 16°25′E
- Country: Austria
- State: Lower Austria
- District: Mistelbach

Government
  - Mayor: Karl Nagl

Area
  - Total: 30.43 km^{2} (11.75 sq mi)
- Elevation: 248 m (814 ft)

Population (2018-01-01)
  - Total: 819
  - Density: 26.9/km^{2} (69.7/sq mi)
- Time zone: UTC+1 (CET)
  - Summer (DST): UTC+2 (CEST)
- Postal code: 2133
- Area code: 02524
- Website: www.fallbach.at

Fallbach is a town in the district of Mistelbach in the Austrian state of Lower Austria.

== Population ==
Historical population
Year	Pop.	±%
1971	1,062	—
2008	826	−22.2%
