= Josef Kleindienst =

Austrian property developer (born 1963)

- Born: 2 September 1963 (age 62); Mistelbach, Austria
- Occupation(s): Property developer and former police officer
- Organization(s): Kleindienst Group; Dubai, UAE
- Known for: Luxury island development in Dubai
- Website: kleindienst.ae

Josef Kleindienst (born 2 September 1963) is an Austrian property developer, former police officer, and whistleblower. He is the chairman of the Kleindienst Group. As of 2016, it was the largest European real estate and property developer in Dubai. In 2020, he was ranked No. 78 in the Construction Week Power 100. During his previous career as a police officer, he wrote and published I Confess, an exposé of a major bribery scandal involving the Freedom Party of Austria. He was also the author of Never Pay a Fine Again (Nie mehr Strafe zahlen) and its self-published sequel in 2002.

== Early life and education ==
Kleindienst was born in 1963 in Mistelbach into a farming family. He had a brother who worked for the police. In 1981, he entered the police academy and completed training the following year.

== Police career ==
For nearly 20 years, Kleindienst worked as a policeman in Vienna. In 1990, he joined the far-right Freedom Party of Austria (FPÖ) and became the leader of the police trade union affiliated with the party.

=== Whistleblowing ===
In October 2000, Kleindienst triggered a major political scandal when he published his book I Confess (Ich gestehe), which exposed large-scale bribery of police officers who were paid $4,000 or more per month to illegally extract intelligence on real and perceived opponents from police computers for party leader Jörg Haider and his associates.

By November 2000, eleven police officers were suspended in what became known as the "spy affair" or "informer affair" (Spitzel-Affäre) based on Kleindienst's allegations, which were largely substantiated by the Austrian media. The international media referred to the affair as "Austria's Watergate". Kleindienst and several Austrian publications later became the target of lawsuits alleging defamation, but were acquitted in 2004.

== Career as property developer ==
In 2002, Kleindienst published Der Polizist als Millionär, a book in which he claimed to have become a millionaire in Austrian schillings by investing in the Wiener Börse. In 2003, he began investing in the Dubai property market, where he made his fortune. He had a franchise license from the German luxury real estate brokerage Engel & Völkers. In 2006, he became self-employed and started Kleindienst & Partners.

Since then, the Kleindienst Group has been developing a $5 billion resort complex called "The Heart of Europe" on six islands in The World, a group of artificial islands off the coast of Dubai. Kleindienst purchased his first island, Austria, in 2007. The other five islands he owns are called Sweden, Switzerland, Germany, Monaco, and St. Petersburg. Following the 2008 financial crisis, FT.com called him "a rare breed of investor in Dubai" for trying to entice buyers back by continuing to develop property there.

The complex includes the Floating Seahorse Villas, which Kleindienst conceived as "130 luxury houseboatlike structures" connecting to St. Petersburg island. The villas feature floor-to-ceiling windows underwater, providing a view of fish swimming by the master bedroom and bathroom, as well as a glass-bottomed jacuzzi on the rooftop. In July 2024, the Financial Times reported that the Heart of Europe islands were "still spiked with cranes despite construction starting a decade ago".

In early 2025, Kleindienst began a legal challenge to the use of the James Bond trademark in the UK and EU, on the basis that the owners had not used the trademark for more than five years. At the time, experts predicted that the challenge would fail.
