= Johanna Nestor =

Austrian ambassador

Johanna Nestor (born 24 November 1917 in Mukachevo, Bereg county, Austria-Hungary as Johanna "Hanna" Müller; died 11 October 2012) was an Austrian ambassador. As one of the first ambassadors in the country, she was considered a pioneer of modern diplomacy in Austria. Nestor was an ambassador to the Republic of Austria in New Delhi, India (1966-1970), in Tel Aviv, Israel (1972-1976) and in Dublin, Ireland (1979-1982). Johanna Nestor was Commander (Grand Officer) of the order of knights from the Holy Sepulcher in Jerusalem.

From 1935 to 1937, Nestor studied at the Consular Academy located in Vienna, Austria, now the Diplomatic Academy of Vienna.
