= Martin Eichtinger =

Austrian diplomat, lawyer and politician

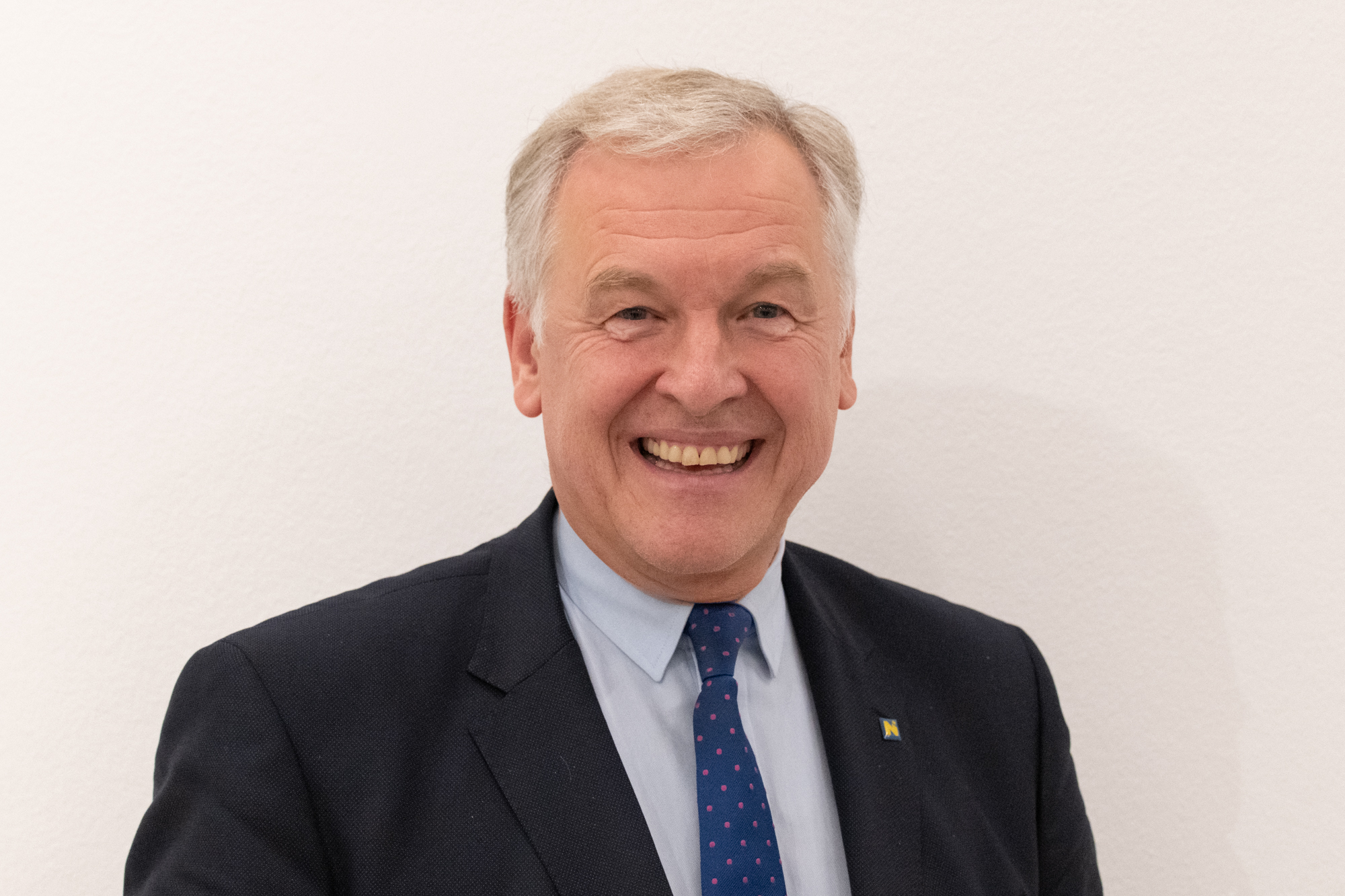
Martin Eichtinger (2022)

Martin Eichtinger (born April 5, 1961 in Graz, Austria) is an Austrian diplomat, lawyer and former politician (ÖVP, Austrian People's Party, member of the EPP - European People's Party). From March 2018 to March 2023, Martin Eichtinger served as a member of the Regional Government of Lower Austria responsible for Housing, Labour and International Relations. After completing his term of office, he returned to the Federal Ministry for European and International Affairs. He was special envoy and coordinator for Austria's neighborhood policy and the foreign policy dimension of the Danube Region, before becoming the director of the Diplomatic Academy of Vienna in 2025.

== Life and career ==
Eichtinger graduated in law from the University of Graz in 1983 and afterwards went on to acquire a diploma in international affairs from Johns Hopkins University. He joined the Austrian Diplomatic service in 1986 and had his first posting at the Austrian Embassy in Mexico City in 1987 as a trainee.

He worked in the Austrian Federal Ministry for Foreign Affairs, occupying positions both in the Department for European Affairs and as personal secretary to the foreign minister, Alois Mock. In 1992 he took office as director of the Austrian Press and Information Service and press counsellor in the embassy in Washington DC, where he served for seven years.

Upon return to Vienna, he accepted a position as the Federation of Industry’s director for international affairs. During the following three years he had two extraordinary assignments: as head of Office of the Special Representative for Payments to former forced and slave labourers of the Nazi regime and as a project manager for a pulp and paper factory in Syktyvkar, Russia, which had been acquired by an Austrian company. Starting in 2003 he served as chief of staff in the Cabinet of the Federal Minister of Economics and Labour, Martin Bartenstein, becoming secretary general in this Ministry just four years later.

From 2007 to 2010 he served as Austrian ambassador to Romania and Moldova, and in 2010 he became director general for cultural policy for the Ministry for Europe, Integration and Foreign Affairs. Since January 19, 2015, Eichtinger serves as Austrian ambassador to the United Kingdom of Great Britain and Northern Ireland. Eichtinger succeeded Karl Wilfing as member of the provincial government on March 22, 2018. Karl Wilfing was elected president of the Diet of Lower Austria the same day. In March 2023, he returned to the Austrian Foreign Ministry and assumed the position of special envoy and coordinator for Austria's neighborhood policy and the foreign policy dimension of the Danube Region. In August 2025, Eichtinger became the director of the Diplomatic Academy of Vienna, succeeding Emil Brix.

== Personal life ==
Eichtinger is married with two children.

== List of Publications ==
- with Helmut Wohnout: Alois Mock: Ein Politiker schreibt Geschichte. Styria Premium, Vienna 2008, ISBN 978-3-222-13234-6.
- Martin Eichtinger: Steirische Lausbubengeschichten: Erinnerungen. Styria Regional, Vienna 2012, ISBN 978-3-701-20107-5.

== Awards ==
- Diploma in International Affairs Johns Hopkins University
- Dr. h.c. of the University of Pitești, Romania
- Dr. h.c. of the West University of Timișoara, Romania
- Dr. h.c. of the Babeș-Bolyai University, Romania
