= Playbrush =

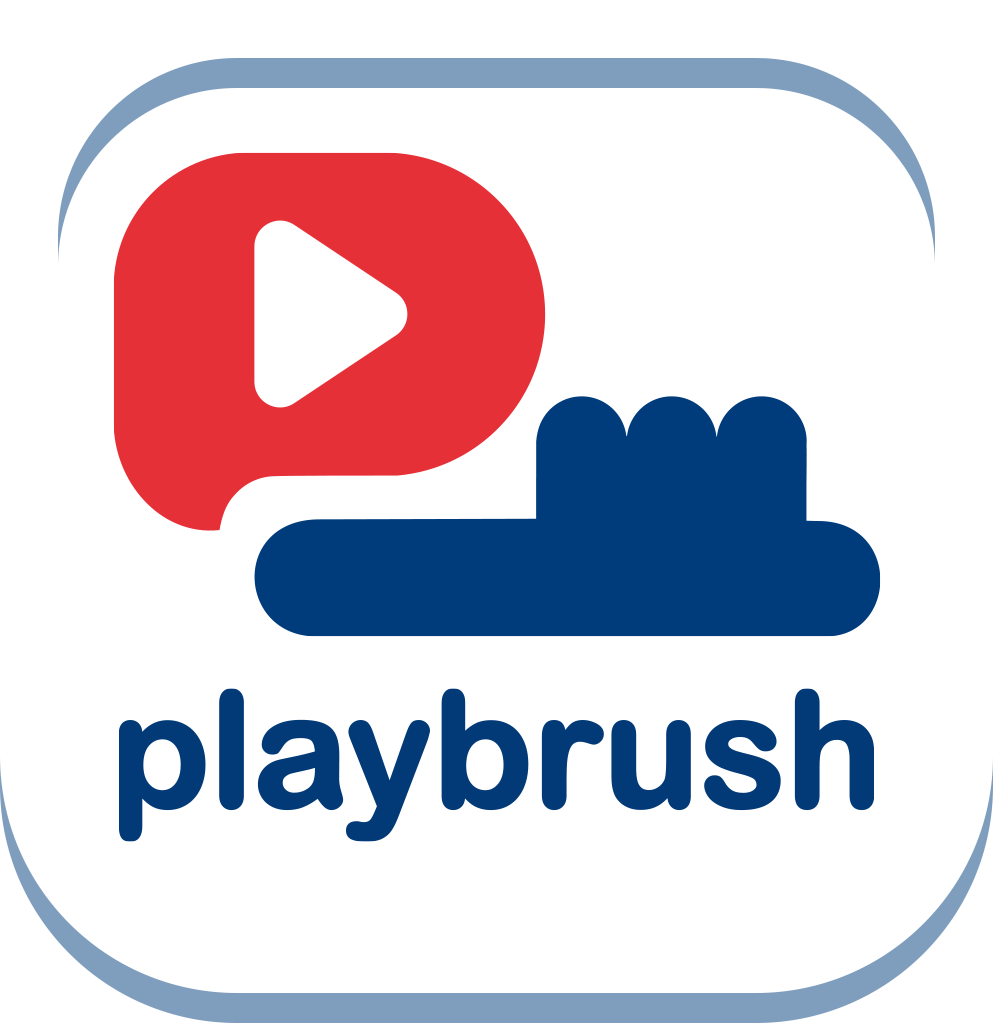
- Type: Subsidiary
- Industry: Health technology; Consumer electronics
- Founded: 2014
- Founders: Paul Varga; Elias Bitar; Matthäus Ittner
- Headquarters: Vienna, Austria
- Area served: Worldwide
- Products: Smart toothbrushes; Mobile applications; Dental insurance subscriptions
- Parent: Sunstar Group (2021–present)
- Website: www.playbrush.com

Playbrush is an oral care device for children that uses a motion-sensor-based interface to control mobile games during dental hygiene. It is developed by an Austro-British company with the same name. The device controls a variety of different games with the intent to encourage children to spend a full two minutes brushing their teeth.

== Devices ==
There are two types of Playbrush devices:

- A dongle that fits onto the end of a manual toothbrush such as the Smart
- Integrated into an electric toothbrush such as the Smart sonic and the Smart One X

== History ==
The technology was developed in 2014 and 2015 by Austrian entrepreneur Paul Varga. Varga observed the behaviour of his three-year-old godson during bedtime rituals while the child was entertained by video clips on their tablet. Together with childhood friend Matthäus Ittner, former fellow student Tolulope Ogunsina, and with help from the University College London, Varga began development of Playbrush in summer 2014. The device launched in November of the same year with mobile apps for Android and iOS in Austria, Germany, and the United Kingdom. In 2018 the electric toothbrush Playbrush Smart Sonic was released.

== Technology ==
Playbrush's technology consists of hardware and software.

The hardware component of Playbrush is an Internet of Things technology that can be integrated into either a manual toothbrush dongle or an electric toothbrush. Equipped with motion sensors, it is able to detect where users are brushing and provide real-time feedback on their brushing behaviour. The captured motion data is then transmitted via Bluetooth Low Energy to the user's smartphone or tablet.

Playbrush's app is designed to translate the brushing data into various interactive games that children can control through their brushing movements. As of summer 2018, there were eleven games available for download on Google Play and the Apple App Store in addition to a brushing coach. The app also includes a detailed statistics section, which provides historical feedback for parents and dentists to track progress.

== Awards ==
The technology and company has received various awards:

- UCL Bright Ideas Award 2014
- TNW Europe Top 3 Startup - 2015
- Best Technological Innovative Contribution Award (Gamification World Awards 2015)
- Health Media Award 2016
- Pitch@Palace Finalist 2016
- Forbes Austria Start-up Academy 2016
- Bits & Pretzels Pro 7 Special Award (250.000 TV Budget Price) 2017
