= Christian Strohal =

Austrian diplomat

- Born: 1 May 1951 (age 75)
- Occupations: Diplomat, human rights activist

Christian Strohal (born 1 May 1951) is an Austrian diplomat. He was formerly the director of the Office for Democratic Institutions and Human Rights from 2003 to 2008.

== Early life and education ==
Strohal studied Law, Economics and International Relations in London, at the Geneva Graduate Institute, and in Vienna, where he received his doctorate in 1975.

== Career ==
From 1976 onward, Strohal worked as a diplomat for the Austrian Ministry of Foreign Affairs, he was, inter alia, to London, Geneva and Rabat. He was a member of the Delegations of Austria at the conferences of the Helsinki Process, which was constituted at the time by the organization known as the CSCE (now the OSCE). From 1985 to 1988 he worked as head of the section of Human Rights. From 1988 to 1992 he was Deputy Head of the Austrian Mission to the United Nations in Geneva. In 1992/93 he was special envoy for the preparation of the World Conference on Human Rights in Vienna.

In 1994, he was appointed Head of the Human Rights Department of the Federal Ministry for Foreign Affairs. Strohal held this post until 2000, when he was appointed Ambassador to Luxembourg. In March 2003 he took up his post as the new director of the Office for Democratic Institutions and Human Rights (ODIHR / ODIHR) of the OSCE in Warsaw, Poland.

In 2008 he became Permanent Representative of Austria to the United Nations in Geneva, 2013 Permanent Representative to the OSCE in Vienna.

In 2016, he was Special Representative for the Austrian Chairmanship of the OSCE in 2017.

As part of his professional duties, Strohal undertook various tasks at the United Nations. He was chairman of the Western Human Rights Group of the United Nations Human Rights Commission (UNHRC) from 1990 to 1992, and vice president of the UNHRC in 1997/98. He served as Vice President of the UNHRC from 2011–2012 and President of the Governing Bodies of the International Organization for Migration (IOM) and President of the Compensation Commission of the UN Security Council (2009–2010). Between 2007 and 2012 he also served as Austria's independent adj. member of the Administrative Council of the European Union Fundamental Rights Agency.

He has published a number of articles on questions of human rights and international security policy, and lectured i.a. at the University of Vienna, the Diplomatic Academy in Vienna, the Geneva Academy on International Humanitarian Law and Human Rights and the European Inter-University Center for Human Rights in Venice, as well as at Princeton University.

For his commitment to human rights, Strohal was awarded the 2008 Felix Ermacora Human Rights Award and the Pro Merito Medal of the European Commission for Democracy through Law from the Venice Commission. He is a member of the International Institute for Human Rights.
