= Permanent Representative of Austria to the United Nations =

Ambassador of Austria to United Nations
- Incumbent; Alexander Marschik since July 6, 2020
- Inaugural holder: Franz Matsch
- Formation: 1956

The Permanent Representative of Austria to the United Nations is the official representative of the government of Austria to the United Nations.

== Permanent Representatives ==
=== Permanent Representatives in New York ===
The Permanent Mission of Austria to the United Nations in New York (UNONY) is located in the skyscraper at 600 Third Avenue in Manhattan. In addition to the General Assembly, the UN Secretariat, the Economic and Social Council and the Trusteeship Council, UNICEF, UNDP and UNFPA are also located there.

- 1956–1964: Franz Matsch
- 1964–1968: Kurt Waldheim
- 1968–1970: Heinrich Haymerle
- 1970–1971: Kurt Waldheim
- 1972–1978: Peter Jankowitsch
- 1978–1982: Thomas Klestil
- 1982–1988: Karl Fischer
- 1988–1993: Peter Hohenfellner
- 1993–1999: Ernst Sucharipa
- 1999–2008: Gerhard Pfanzelter
- 2008–2011: Thomas Mayr-Harting
- 2012–2015: Martin Sajdik
- 2015–2020: Jan Kickert
- 2020–present: Alexander Marschik

=== Permanent Representatives in Geneva ===
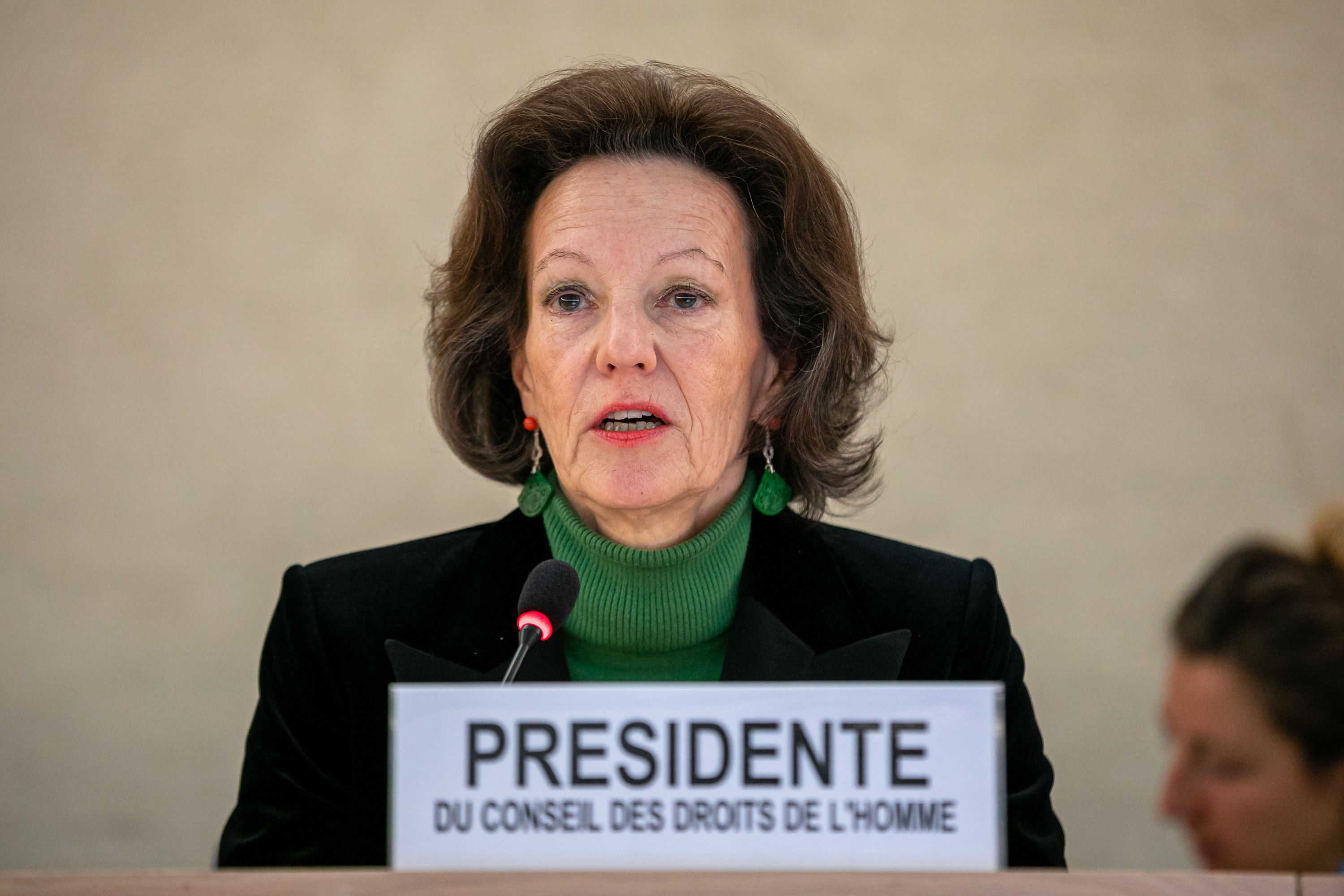
Elisabeth Tichy-Fisslberger, as President of the Human Rights Council, 2020

The Permanent Mission of Austria to the United Nations in Geneva (UNOG) and the Specialized Agencies at Geneva is located at 35–37 Avenue-Giuseppe-Motta in Geneva. The representation includes UNHRC, UNCTAD, UNCD, UNDRO, UNITAR, WHO, ILO, ITU, WIPO, WMO and the UN treaty bodies. It also includes the WTO Division for the World Tourism Organization, whose headquarters is the Permanent Mission in Madrid.

- 1960–1966: Emanuel Treu
- …
- 1988–1991: Franz Ceska
- …
- 1996–2001: Harald Kreid
- 2002–2008: Wolfgang Petritsch
- 2008–2013: Christian Strohal
- 2013–2017: Thomas Hajnoczi
- 2017–present: Elisabeth Tichy-Fisslberger

=== Permanent Representatives in Vienna ===
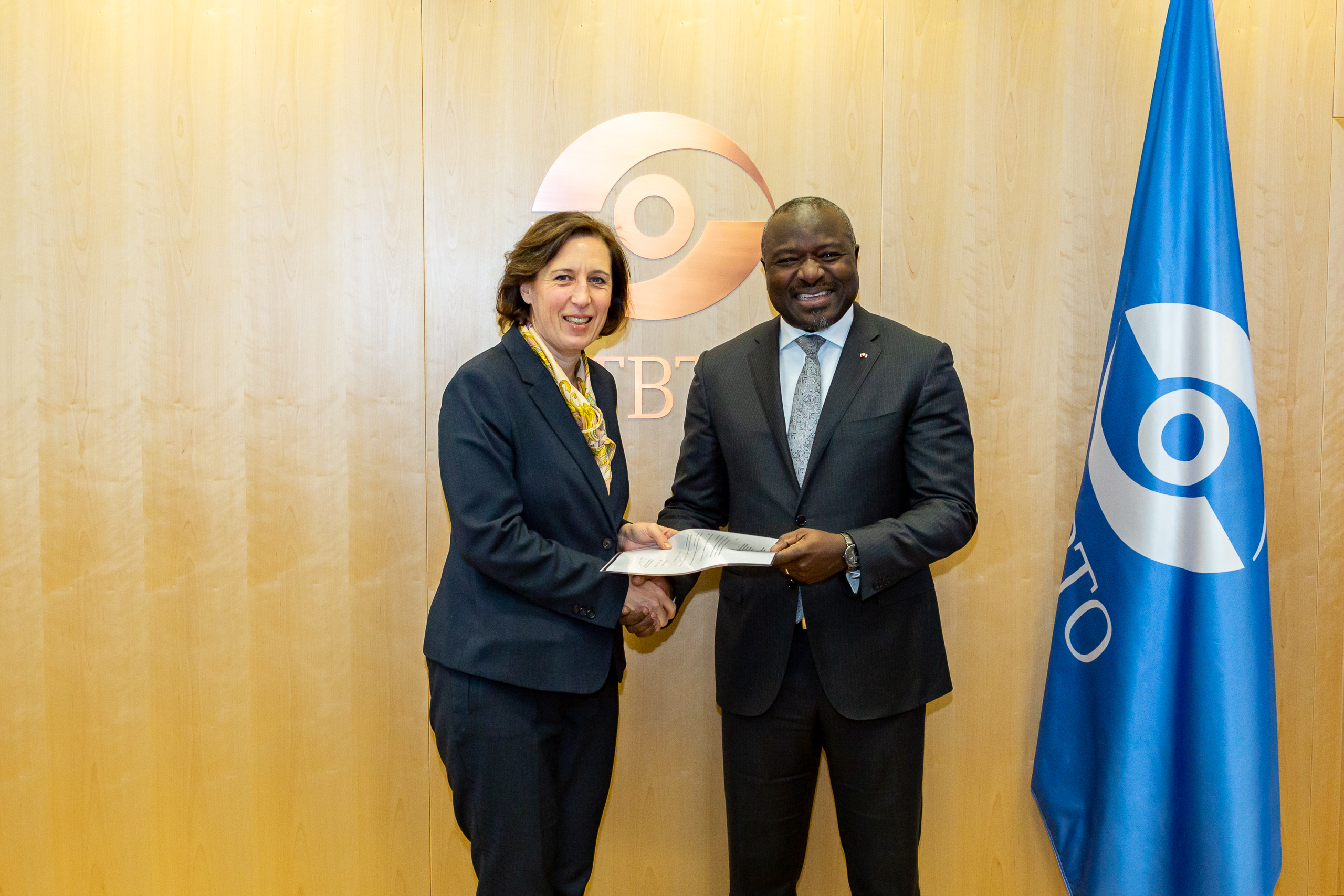
Gabriela Sellner presenting her credentials to the Executive Secretary of the Comprehensive Nuclear-Test-Ban Treaty Organization, 2018

The Permanent Mission of Austria to the United Nations in Vienna (UNOV) is located in the Andromeda Tower in Vienna's 22nd District Donaustadt. It also includes the Permanent Mission to the IAEA, UNIDO and CTBTO. The Vienna offices of UNOV, UNODC, UNCITRAL, UNOOSA, SEforALL are also entrusted with this task.

- 1987–1994: Richard Wotava
- 1994–2001: Ferdinand Mayrhofer-Grünbühel
- 2001–2008: Thomas Stelzer
- 2008–2012: Helmut Böck
- 2012–2018: Christine Stix-Hackl
- 2018–Present: Gabriela Sellner
