= Heinrich Pfusterschmid-Hardtenstein =

Austrian diplomat

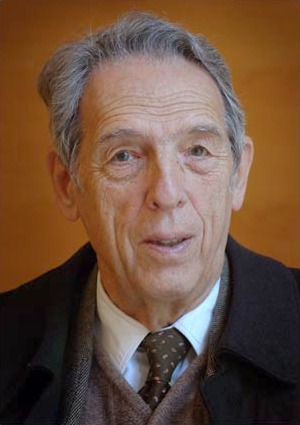
Heinrich Pfusterschmid-Hardtenstein

Heinrich Pfusterschmid-Hardtenstein (16 January 1927 – 6 May 2024, Graz, Styria) was an Austrian diplomat, who was also active in the academic world and cultural policy.

== Biography ==
After attending elementary and secondary school (1934–45) Heinrich Pfusterschmid-Hardtenstein studied law at the University of Graz. Following graduation as doctor of law he practiced at courts and legal firms in his home town.

In 1952 Pfusterschmid-Hardtenstein became secretary of the European Youth Campaign of the European Movement and later as a Fulbright scholar - Fulbright Program - studied economics at the University of California at Berkeley (1954/55).

In 1956 he entered the Austrian diplomatic service and was appointed to the embassy in The Hague as attaché. He acted as deputy head of delegation at Austria’s mission to the High Authority of the European Coal and Steel Community in Luxembourg (1960–67). Pfusterschmid-Hardtenstein opened Austria’s embassy to Luxembourg as chargé d'affaires.

As director of the Department for Economic Integration in the Federal Ministry for Europe, Integration and Foreign Affairs (1967–71) he was responsible for European integration and the Danube Commission and led negotiations on the steel chapter of the free trade agreement between EFTA and the European Communities.

In the years 1971-78 Pfusterschmid-Hardtenstein was Austrian ambassador to Finland. In this capacity he headed the Austrian delegation at preparatory negotiations for the Conference on Security and Co-operation in Europe (CSCE). In 1978 he was appointed director of the Diplomatic Academy of Vienna, a position in which he served until 1986. During this period he was co-director of the international meetings of directors of diplomatic academies and institutes of international relations. He also advised the Ministry of Foreign Affairs (Saudi Arabia) on the establishment of a diplomatic academy in Riyadh. While director of the Diplomatic Academy of Vienna he led seminars, and also acted as employee representative and member of the disciplinary commission of the Foreign Ministry.

From 1986 until retiring from the Ministry for Foreign Affairs in 1992 Pfusterschmid-Hardtenstein served as Austrian ambassador to the Netherlands.

Heinrich Pfusterschmid-Hardtensein lived with his wife Florentine in Vienna until his death on 6 May 2024. He had three children: Johanna, Sophie and Katharina.

== Voluntary activities ==
In 1992 Pfusterschmid-Hardtenstein was elected by Österreichisches College as honorary president. In this capacity he was responsible until 2000 for planning and staging the annual European Forum in Alpbach - European Forum Alpbach -, which has been held since 1945. During his presidency Pfusterschmid-Hardtenstein introduced a number of innovations to the event and oversaw construction of a new Congress Center.

Starting in 1991, Pfusterschmid-Hardtenstein served as president of the Austrian-Finnish Society and vice president of the Association for Social Sciences (Sozialwissenschaftliche Arbeitsgemeinschaft).

== Awards and honours ==
- Decoration of Honour for Services to the Republic of Austria - Grand Decoration of Honour in Silver for Services to the Republic of Austria (2000)
- Austrian Decoration for Science and Art - Austrian Cross of Honour for Science and Art, 1st Class
- Grand Decoration of Honour in Gold of the Province of Styria
- Order of Merit of the Grand Duchy of Luxembourg - Grand Cross of the Order of Merit of the Grand Duchy of Luxembourg
- Order of the Lion of Finland - Grand Cross of the Order of the Lion of Finland
- Order of Orange-Nassau - Grand Cross of the Order of Orange-Nassau of the Kingdom of the Netherlands

== Publications ==
- Der Kleinstadt in der modernen Welt [The Small State in the Modern World], Verlag für Geschichte und Politik, Vienna, 1970.
- “Von der Orientalischen Akademie zur K.u.K. Konsularakademie” in Die Habsburgermonarchie im System der internationalen Beziehungen 1 [From the Oriental Academy to the Imperial and Royal Consular Academy in The Habsburg Monarchy in the System of International Relations 1], Verlag der Österreichischen Akademie der Wissenschaften, Vienna, 1989. ISBN 3-7001-1682-9.
- Dialog Ukraine: Dialogkongress 1992 [Dialogue Ukraine: Dialogue Congress 1992], Ibera-Verlag, Vienna, 1993. ISBN 3-900436-09-6.
- Kleinstaat Keinstaat? [Small State, No State?], Böhlau Verlag, Vienna, 2001. ISBN 3-205-99429-9.
- Kleine Geschichte der Diplomatischen Akademie Wien: Ausbildung im Bereich der internationalen Beziehungen seit 1754 [A Brief History of the Diplomatic Academy in Vienna: Education for International Relations since 1754], Diplomatische Akademie, Vienna, 2008, (photographs by Willy Puchner), ISBN 3-902021-56-X.
- Editor, Jahrbuch der Diplomatischen Akademie in Wien 14-21 [Yearbook of the Diplomatic Academy in Vienna 14-21], Verlag der Diplomatischen Akademie.

== Editor, Proceedings of the European Forum Alpbach ==
- 1992 Entscheidung für Europa – Bewußtsein und Realität [Opting for Europe – Image and Reality]. OCLC 28966065.
- 1993 Was ist der Mensch? – Menschenbilder im Wandel [The Essence of Human Nature. Changing Images of Man]. ISBN 3-900436-07-X.
- 1994 Zeit und Wahrheit. [Time and Truth]. ISBN 3-900436-06-1.
- 1995 Das Ganze und seine Teile. [The Whole and Its Parts]. ISBN 3-900436-31-2.
- 1996 Das Normale und das Pathologische – Was ist Gesund? [Normality vs. Pathology – What is Health?]. ISBN 3-900436-46-0.
- 1997 Wissen wozu? Erbe und Zukunft der Erziehung [Knowledge to what End? – The Heritage and Future of Education]. ISBN 3-900436-65-7.
- 1998 Die zerrissene Gesellschaft [The Fragmented Society]. ISBN 3-900436-74-6.
- 1999 Materie, Geist und Bewusstsein [Matter, Mind, Consciousness]. ISBN 3-900436-92-4.
