= Zoran Kalabić =

Serbian businessman, humanist and benefactor

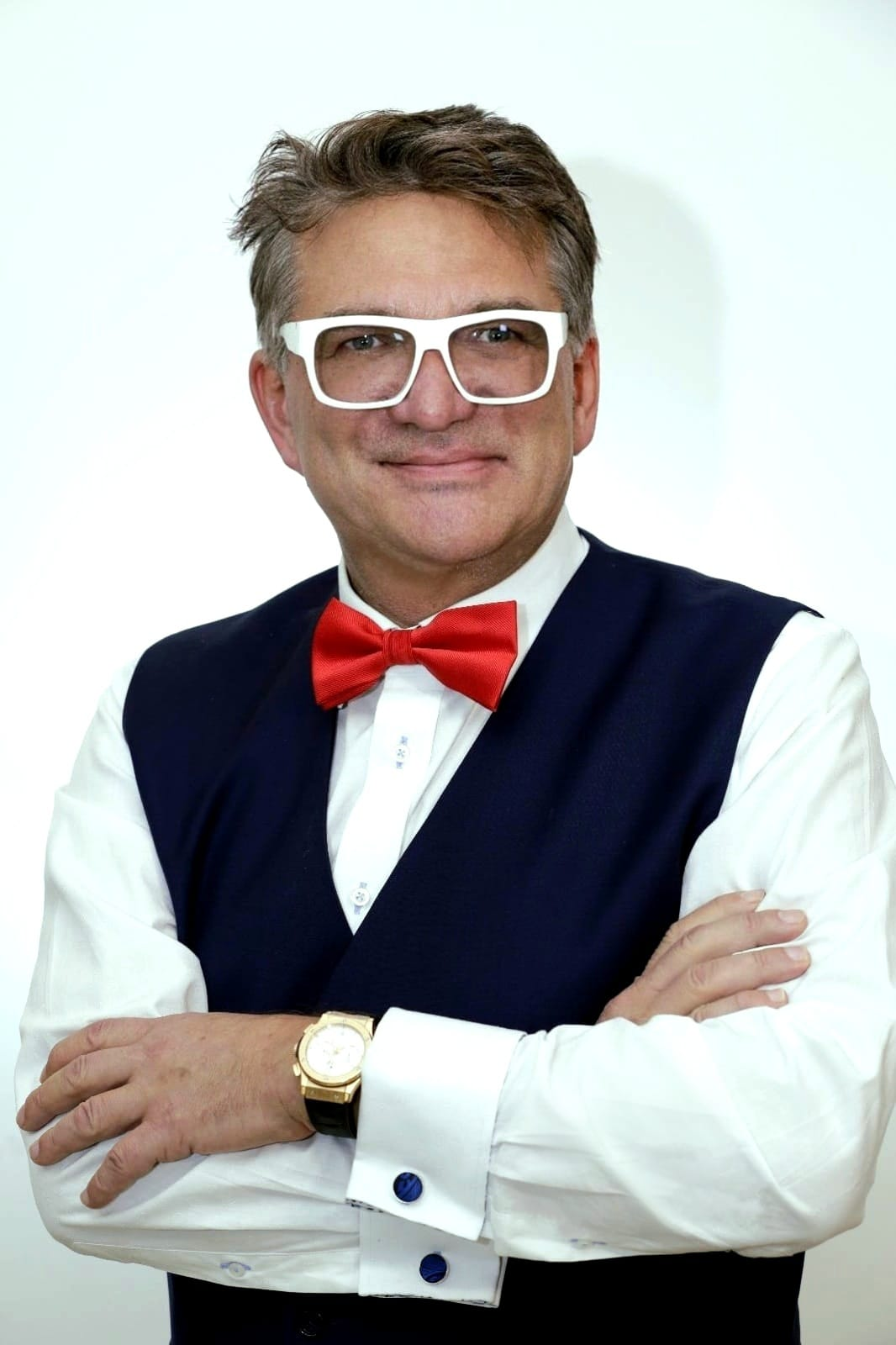
- Born: Paraćin
- Occupations: Businessman, humanist, and benefactor
- Awards: Order of Karađorđe's Star
- Website: zorankalabic.com

Zoran Kalabic dipl. oec, MBA (Paracin) is a Serbian businessman who has lived in Vienna since 1987. He is involved in projects promoting the preservation of the Serbian language, culture and tradition abroad and in Serbia and Bosnia and Herzegovina. In 2001, he was awarded the golden medallion N. I Petrović by Government of Montenegro for special merits in promoting Montenegro in Austria. For special merits in strengthening relations between the Republic of Serbia and the Republic of Austria in the field of public and economic activities, he was decorated by the decree of the President of Serbia with the Order of Karađorđe's Star in 2023.

== Youth and education ==
Zoran Kalabić was born in Paraćin. In his youth, he boxed at BK Kablovi in Jagodina, becoming the Serbian welterweight champion. He has two university degrees in economics as well as a master's degree in business administration, and as of 2024 is preparing for a doctorate. He studied economics at the University of Kragujevac, and upon his arrival in Vienna, he finished his studies at the Joseph Schumpeter Institute in Wels in Austria. In 2012, he completed his master's degree and obtained the title of Master of Business Administration – Real Estate Management, and then enrolled in the Vienna School of International Studies in Austria, after which he became a real estate broker and manager. In 2013, he became a member of the Austrian Senate of Economy.

== Career ==
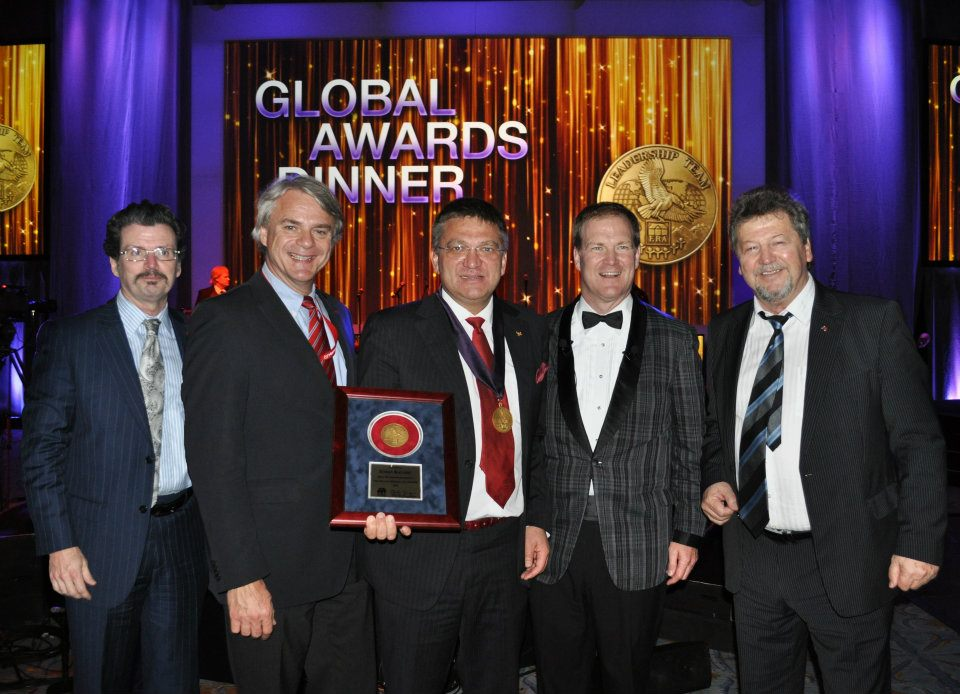
Kalabić with colleagues, ERA global award

After moving to Vienna in 1987, together with his brother Dragan, he started several projects including the tourist agency "Falcon Tours", which promoted the tourist potential of Serbia and Montenegro. These businesses in Austria were interrupted by the bombing of Yugoslavia in 1999. At that moment, Kalabić turned to the field of real estate. After a series of successful business years, Kalabić decided to start his own business and in 2003 he founded his own company with his brother. "4M IMMOBILIEN" which is a partner ЕRA Immobilien, at that moment the largest real estate chain in Europe with over 1300 offices. They are engaged in construction, investment and sale of land and real estate. He organized the first Serbian Economic Ball in Vienna (2014). He founded in 2017 new Serbian citizens' association "Privilegija" in Vienna with the aim of providing free services to serbian people and to employ young Serbs in Austria. In 2023 he was a member of a consortium that launched a digital platform for the Serbian diaspora called W-Radio media group. As the founder of the agency 4M Immobillien, he often speaks publicly in the media about trends and fluctuations in the real estate market, and in 2024, he became the first Serbian from the diaspora to give an exclusive interview to the American business magazine Forbes.

== Charity work ==
Zoran Kalabić is participant the Serbian and Bosnian community in Austria and Serbia. He has financially supported "St. Anna Kinderspital" children's hospital. He donated an ambulance and a fire truck to his native Paraćin, and he also provided help to Serbia and Bosnia and Herzegovina after 2014 Southeast Europe floods. He helped rebuild Hilandar Monastery after the fire and has continued donating to this day. Kalabić cooperates with the cultural society "Prosvjeta" in Vienna, the Serbian Cultural Center, the Association of Serbian Businessmen, and for the last 25 years he has been helping the organization of the Saint Sava Ball at the Hofburg Palace in Vienna. He finances the publishing activities and cultural, artistic and educational events of Serbs in the diaspora. He also collaborates with the Tesla Science Foundation from Philadelphia. At the 26th Saint Sava Ball held in Vienna's Hofburg Palace, Kalabić bid on a replica of the "Miroslav Gospel" at a charity auction, with proceeds directed to support Ljiljana Dukić, a single mother of three from Obrenovac, Serbia, living in challenging conditions. While the ball attracted over 2,500 guests, including diplomats, businesspeople, cultural figures, and members of the European jet set, Kalabić personally hosted 74 distinguished guests from various professions and backgrounds, including journalist Vesna de Vinča, opera director Tadija Miletić, singer Nenad Knežević Knez, Miss Serbia Aleksandra Rutović and many others.

== Personal life ==
Kalabić lives and works in Vienna along with his wife Adrianna Lushezy and four children. He has an older brother, Dragan, who is his business partner. Together with the Serbian representatives in the Austrian government, he works to ensure that the Serbs receive the status of a national minority in Austria.

== Awards ==
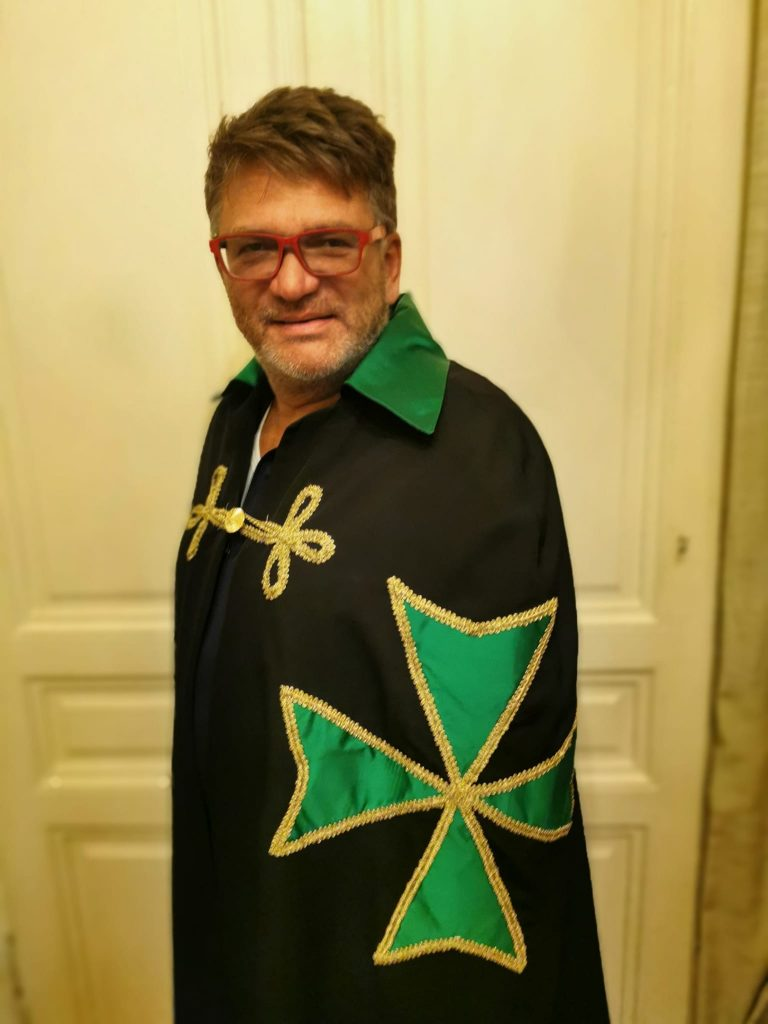
Zoran Kalabić as Knight Commander of the Order of the Hospitality Army of Saint Lazarus of Jerusalem

Kalabić was named the best realtor in the USA (Los Angeles 2009, Las Vegas 2017), in Europe (Berlin 2011) and the best broker in the world (New Orleans 2022). Except high monetary awards, the German, Austrian and American business associations awarded him with more than 30 trophies and diplomas.

He is also the recipient of declarations and other recognitions for humanity, among which the most notable is that he was the first Serbian and Orthodox to be declared as a "Knight and Commander of the Order of the Hospitality of Saint Lazarus of Jerusalem" for his support of the St. Anna Kinderspital. The Tesla Science Foundation in Philadelphia honoured him with the Tesla Gold Medal, and also received many awards for the promotion of culture and art.

In 2023. Zoran Kalabic was awarded by the President of Serbia Aleksandar Vučić with the star of Karadjordje, on the Statehood day of Serbia Sretenje, for special merits in strengthening relations between the Republic of Serbia and the Republic of Austria in the field of public and economic activities. He received a gold award for special contributions by Montenegro, he was awarded during his work at RE/MAX in Austria as the best agent real estate, and among the other awards the following stand out:

- Award of the Association of Serbs in Austria and France for the promotion of Serbian culture and language.
- Knight Commander of Military & Hospitaller Order of Saint Lazarus of Jerusalem – given by the Grand Priory of Austria; London, Vienna Söchau September 2021.
- October award of the city of Jagodina.
- Order of Karađorđe's Star third level (2023)
- Award of the association of Serbs in Austria and France for the promotion of Serbian culture and language.
- Tesla Gold Medal of the Tesla Science Foundation of Philadelphia, November 2021.
- Status of Senator at the Austrian Economic Senate for Training and Further Education, 2022

== See also ==
- Serbian diaspora
