= Ernst Fasan =

Austrian lawyer (1926–2021)

Ernst Leo Albin Fasan (12 August 1926 – 20 July 2021) was an Austrian lawyer and a recognized authority in space law, including metalaw.

== Biography ==
Fasan was born in Vienna. He grew up in Neunkirchen and attended school in Wiener Neustadt. In 1950 he earned his Doctor of Law at the University of Vienna.

Fasan published numerous papers on problems of space law, including metalaw and the scientific Search for Extraterrestrial Intelligence (SETI). In 1970, Fasan published what remains the seminal book on Metalaw, Relations with Alien Intelligences: The Scientific Basis of Metalaw. Fasan was a practicing attorney when in 1958 he helped to establish the Permanent Committee on Space Law of the International Astronautical Federation. Two years later his friend, colleague and fellow space law pioneer Andrew G. Haley invited him to join the committee's successor, the International Institute of Space Law. Fasan was elected to the IISL board of directors in 1962 and also subsequently served as an officer of the organization. In 1963 the IISL awarded Fasan the Andrew G. Haley Gold Medal.

In June 2008, as an honorary director, Fasan was among those representing the IISL when it was granted Permanent Observer status before the United Nations Committee on the Peaceful Uses of Outer Space (COPUOS). Fasan remained active in the SETI field as a member of the SETI Permanent Study Group of the International Academy of Astronautics.

Fasan died in July 2021 at the age of 94.

== See also ==
- Peter Jankowitsch
