= Thomas Mayr-Harting =

Austrian diplomat

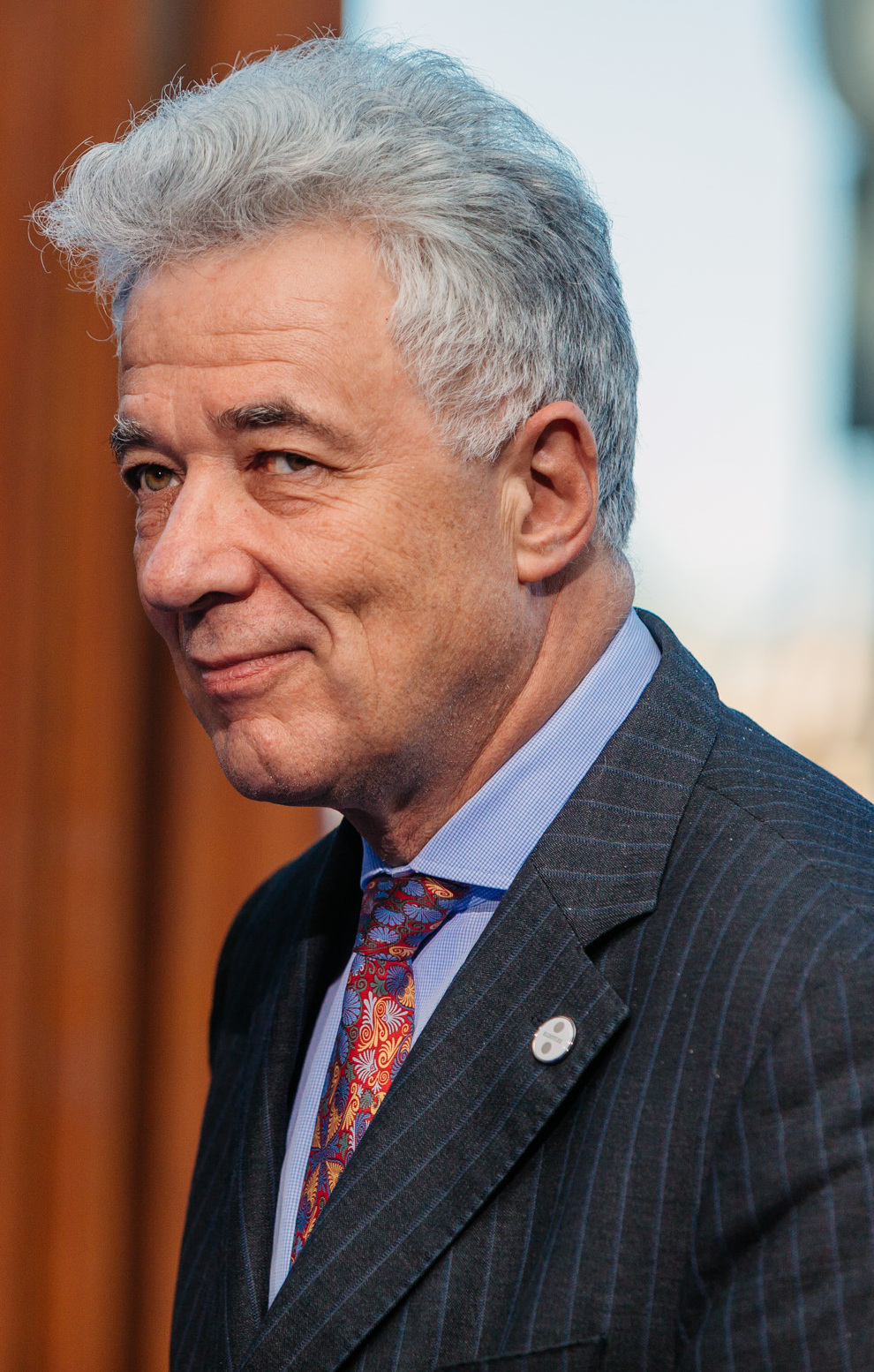

Head of the Delegation of the European Union to the United Nations
- In office 2011–2015
- President: Herman Van Rompuy, Donald Tusk (European Council), José Manuel Barroso, Jean-Claude Juncker (European Commission)
- Preceded by: Pedro Serrano
- Succeeded by: João Vale de Almeida

Permanent Representative of Austria to the United Nations
- In office 2008–2011
- President: Heinz Fischer
- Preceded by: Gerhard Pfanzelter
- Succeeded by: Martin Sajdik

Personal details
- Born: May 22, 1954 (age 72) Surrey, United Kingdom
- Education: University of Vienna, College of Europe
- Occupation: Diplomat

Thomas Mayr-Harting (born 22 May 1954 in Epsom, Surrey) is an Austrian diplomat. He was the Special Representative of the OSCE Chairperson-in-Office for the Transdniestrian Settlement Process from January 2020 to December 2024. From November 2015 to August 2019 he was managing director for Europe and Central Asia in the European External Action Service.

== Family and education ==
He is the son of Herbert Mayr-Harting, a lawyer who was the Czechoslovak representative at the United Nations War Crimes Commission. His brother, Henry Mayr-Harting, is a British medievalist Church historian. His grandfather, Robert Mayr-Harting, was Czechoslovak Minister of Justice from 1926 to 1929.

Mayr-Harting received his law degree at the University of Vienna in 1977. From 1977 to 1978 he studied European law at the College of Europe in Bruges (Belgium). In 1978 Mayr-Harting was awarded the Diploma of The Hague Academy of International Law.

== Career ==
He joined the Austrian diplomatic service in 1979. In the course of his career he served, inter alia, with the Austrian Mission to the European Communities in Brussels (1982-1986), the Austrian Embassy in Moscow (1986-1990), the Private Office of the Austrian Foreign Minister (1991-1995) and as Deputy Political Director and Director for Security Policy and Policy Planning (1995-1999). From 1999 to 2003 he was Ambassador of Austria to Belgium and Head of the Austrian Mission to NATO. From 2002 to 2004 Mayr-Harting also was the Special Representative of the Austrian Foreign Minister for the Western Balkans. Mayr-Harting served as Political Director (Director General for Political Affairs) of the Austrian Foreign Ministry from 2003 to 2008. In 2008 he also chaired the supervisory board of the Austrian Development Agency.

He then served as Permanent Representative of Austria to the United Nations in New York between December 2008 and October 2011. In this latter capacity he also represented Austria on the United Nations Security Council from 1 January 2009 to 31 December 2010. Mayr-Harting was the President of the UN Security Council in November 2009.

From 2010 until October 2015 Mayr-Harting was the Head of the EU Delegation to the United Nations in New York City. He then moved back to Brussels, where he was managing director for Europe and Central Asia in the European External Action Service until August 2019.

== Other activities ==
- European Forum Alpbach, Co-Chair of the International Advisory Board

== Lectures ==
The European Union in the United Nations in the Lecture Series of the United Nations Audiovisual Library of International Law
