= Austro-British Society =

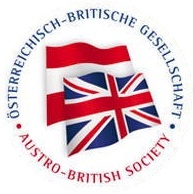
- Abbreviation: ABS
- Formation: 2009
- Type: NGO
- Location: Vienna, Austria
- Key people: Kurt Tiroch (President); Alexander Christiani (Vice President)
- Website: oebrg.at

The Austro-British Society (ABS) is a non-governmental organization that promotes the exchange between Austria and the United Kingdom. The Society was refounded in Vienna in 2009 by Kurt Tiroch and ever since supports the development of the bilateral relationship on cultural, economic and political topics.

To fulfil its mission, the Society organises a wide variety of events which allow the members of the Society to discuss current subjects surrounding Austria and the United Kingdom and also give them a platform to network. The Society has around 500 members. 57 thereof include corporate members (figures for January 2016).

== Activities ==
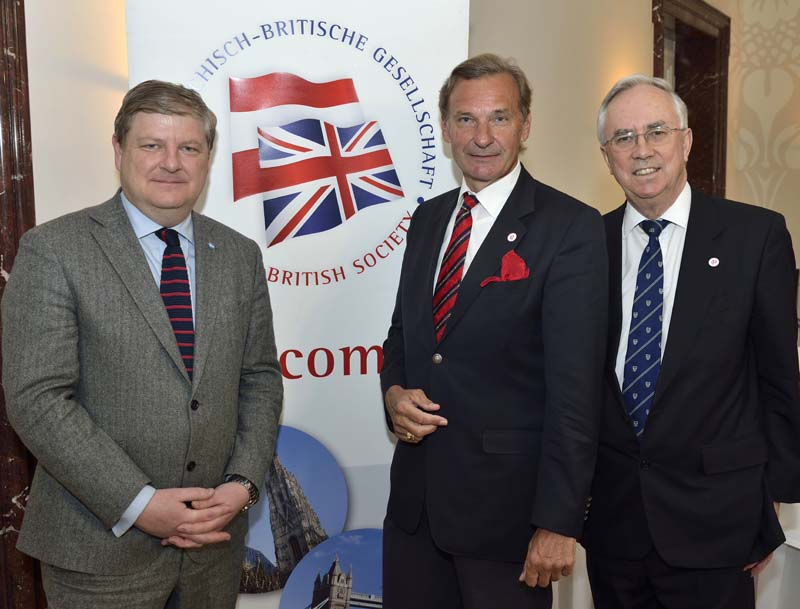
Angus Robertson (SNP), ABS President Kurt Tiroch and diplomat Colin Munro discuss the referendum on Scottish independence. 2014 in the Café Landtmann.

On average, the Society organises two events per month. The scope of the topics covered reaches from political debates, theatre visits, musical evenings and sport events to lectures about business, diplomacy, social events and short trips to the United Kingdom.

Prominent guest speakers from politics have included, amongst others, the former Austrian Chancellor Wolfgang Schüssel, British Minister for Europe David Lidington, Foreign Minister Sebastian Kurz and the British Member of Parliament (SNP) Angus Robertson (see picture). Speakers in the field of diplomacy have included former state secretary and diplomat Hans Winkler and the Austrian ambassador to the United Kingdom, Emil Brix. Representatives from business have included the Governor of Austria's central bank Oesterreichische Nationalbank Ewald Nowotny, OMV CFO David Davies, and BP's global head of human resources, Helmut Schuster.

== History ==
The predecessor organisation of today's Austro-British Society was founded in 1946. After World War II the Allies, consisting of France, the United Kingdom, the United States, and the Soviet Union, sought to promote the bilateral ties with Austria. They wanted to improve not only their formal relationships but also their relationships aside official diplomacy. Hence, several bilateral organisations were founded - including amongst them, the Austro-British Society. For decades, the Society organised language courses and exchange programmes. By 2005, however, the Society had become more and more inactive and ultimately dissolved.

Only four years later the Society was refounded by the Austrian Kurt Tiroch. Tiroch, a former manager of the British energy company BP, rallied a group of like-minded people and forged the first plans on how to organise the Society anew. In September 2010, the Society held its constitutive general assembly at the residency of the British ambassador in Vienna and under the presence of then British ambassador to Austria, Simon Smith, and then Austrian ambassador to the United Kingdom, Emil Brix.

Today, the Society counts about 500 members, thereof 57 corporate members (figures for January 2016). In 2015, it organised 31 events for its members and interested people.

In November 2015, the Society was recognised as "the most distinguished society of friendship of 2015" by the Austrian Federal Ministry of Science, Research and Economy. The award was handed to the Society on 6 November 2015.

== Board members (extract) ==
Representatives from diplomacy and business form the current Board of the Austro-British Society:

- Susan le Jeune d’Allegeershecque (Honorary president), current ambassador of the United Kingdom to Austria
- Simon Smith (Honorary president), former ambassador of the United Kingdom to Austria
- Emil Brix (Honorary president), Austrian ambassador to the United Kingdom
- Kurt Tiroch (President), entrepreneur
- Alexander Christiani (Vice president), former Austrian ambassador to London, The Hague and Pretoria
- Friedrich Fruth (General secretary), PR manager
- Jörg Kössler (Treasurer), entrepreneur

== Links ==
Media related to Austro-British Society at Wikimedia Commons

- Official website
- Entry into the central association registry (Zentraler Vereinsregister) of the interior ministry (ZVR-number: 227967446)
