= Willy Puchner =

Austrian photographer, artist, painter and author (born 1952)

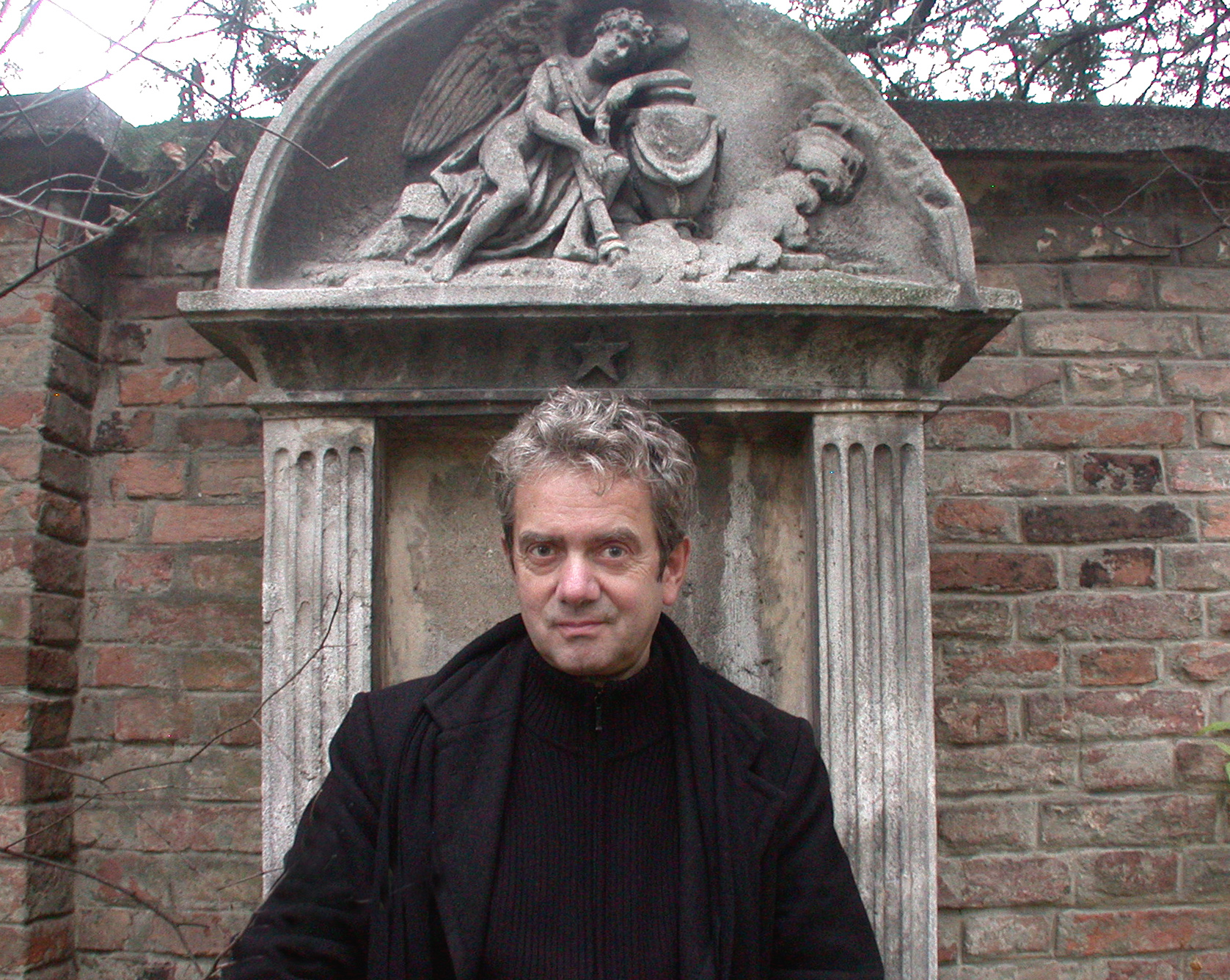
- Puchner in 2007
- Born: 15 March 1952 (age 74); Mistelbach, Lower Austria, Austria
- Occupations: Photographer, artist, painter, and writer
- Website: https://www.willypuchner.com

Willy Puchner (born 15 March 1952) is an Austrian photographer, artist, painter, and author.

== Early life and career ==
Puchner was born and raised in Mistelbach an der Zaya, Lower Austria, on 15 March 1952. In 1967, he relocated to Vienna to attend photography classes at the Höhere Graphische Lehr- und Versuchsanstalt (Higher Federal Institution for Graphic Education and Research). After completing his studies in 1974, Puchner taught photography at HGBLuVA for a short period.

Since 1978, Puchner has worked as a freelance photographer and writer based in Vienna. He later pursued studies in various social and life sciences, including philosophy and sociology, and obtained a master's degree in philosophy, though it is unknown from which educational institution. During the 1980s, he delivered numerous lectures on private photography at universities, museums, and galleries.

Starting in 1989, Puchner has worked regularly for the Wiener Zeitung, an Austrian newspaper.

== Photography projects ==
For one of Puchner's projects, a children's picture book titled, "Penguins – Traveling the World", he traveled with a pair of penguin statues, "Joe and Sally", taking them to tourist sites—including the sea, the desert, New York, Sydney, Paris, Venice, Tokyo, Honolulu, Rome, and Cairo—to photograph them there.

Other Puchner projects have centered on portraits of elderly subjects: "Die 90-jährigen" (At the Age of 90), "Dialog mit dem Alter" (Dialogue with the High Age), "Die 100-jährigen" (At the Age of 100), "Lebensgeschichte und Fotografie" (Oral History and Photography), and "Liebe im Alter" (Love at High Age).

Overall, Puncher has held over 30 different exhibitions worldwide on the subject of photography, and over 20 different printed projects, including children's picture books and various photo sets, featuring his photography work. The editions for these printed projects are available in English and German.

== Exhibitions ==
- 1980: Museum Moderner Kunst (Museum of Modern Art), Vienna and Künstlerhaus (House of Artists), N.Ö. Galerie, Vienna
- 1982: Museum des 20. Jahrhundert (Museum of the 20th Century), Vienna
- 1984: Österreichisches Fotomuseum (Austrian Museum of Photography), Bad Ischl
- 1992: Steirischer Herbst, Graz
- 2001: "On the Road at Home" (Auf Reisen zu Hause), gallery Atrium ed Arte, Vienna
- 2005: Stopover New York, gallery Atrium ed Arte, Vienna
- Further exhibitions in Berlin, Bremen, Kleve, Braunschweig, Klagenfurt, Norfolk, Washington, D.C, Mumbai, Beirut, Tokyo, Osaka, Ōita, Nagoya, and Sapporo

== Bibliography ==
- Bäume, 1980, (words Henry David Thoreau), ISBN 3-85447-271-4
- Zum Abschied, zur Wiederkehr, 1981 (words Hermann Hesse), ISBN 3-206-01222-8
- Gestaltung mit Licht, Form und Farbe, 1981, ISBN 3-87467-207-7
- Bilder österreichischer Städte, (words Harald Sterk), 1982, ISBN 3-217-01262-3
- Strahlender Untergang, (words Christoph Ransmayr), 1982, ISBN 3-85447-006-1
- Bilder österreichischer Landschaft, (words Harald Sterk), 1983, ISBN 3-217-01189-9
- Andalusien, (words Walter Haubrich), 1983, ISBN 3-7658-0420-7
- Die Wolken der Wüste, 1983 (words Manfred Pichler), ISBN 3-89416-150-7
- Dorf-Bilder, 1983, ISBN 3-218-00387-3
- Zugvögel seit jeher, 1983, (words Erich Hackl), ISBN 3-210-24848-6
- Das Herz des Himmels, 1985, (words Erich Hackl), ISBN 3-210-24813-3
- Die Sehnsucht der Pinguine, 1992, ISBN 3-446-17200-9
- Ich bin ..., 1997, ISBN 3-7918-2910-6
- Penguins – Traveling the World, 1999, ISBN 978-3894055189
- Tagebuch der Natur, 2001, ISBN 3-85326-244-9
- Flughafen. Eine eigene Welt, 2003, ISBN 3-85326-277-5
- Illustriertes Fernweh. Vom Reisen und nach Hause kommen, 2006, ISBN 3-89405-389-5
- Wien. Vergnügen und Melancholie, 2008, ISBN 3-85033-159-8
- Willy Puchners Welt der Farben, 2011, ISBN 3-7017-2081-9
- ABC der fabelhaften Prinzessinnen. Nord-Süd Verlag, Zürich 2013, ISBN 978-3-314-10129-8.
- Hans im Glück. Nord-Süd Verlag, Zürich 2014, ISBN 978-3-314-10158-8
- Unterwegs, mein Schatz! G&G Verlag, Wien 2015, ISBN 978-3707451009
- Willy's World of Wonders, NorthSouth Books 2019, ISBN 978-0735843837

=== English editions ===
- Joe & Sally: A Long Way from Home, 1993, ISBN 0-14-023118-8
- Penguins - Traveling the World, 1999, ISBN 3-8290-1412-0
- A Brief History of the Diplomatic Academy in Vienna, 2008, together with Heinrich Pfusterschmid-Hardtenstein, ISBN 3-902021-56-X.[2]
- Vienna. Pleasure and Melancholy, 2008, ISBN 3-85033-177-6
- The ABC of Fabulous Princesses, 2014, ISBN 978-0735841130
- The ABC of Fantastic Princes, 2015, ISBN 978-0735841987

== Awards ==
- Theodor Körner Prize for art (1983)
- Theodor Körner Prize for social sciences (1988)
- Österreichischer Staatspreis für Kinder- und Jugendliteratur for Tagebuch der Natur (2002)
- Kinderbuchpreis der Stadt Wien for Tagebuch der Natur (2002)
- Kunstmediator (2011)
- Österreichischer Staatspreis für Kinder- und Jugendliteratur „Willy Puchners Welt der Farben“ (2012)
- Kinder- und Jugendbuchpreis der Stadt Wien (Illustrationspreis) „Willy Puchners Welt der Farben“ (2012)
