= Gerhard Pfanzelter =

Austrian politician and diplomat (born 1943)

H.E. Gerhard Pfanzelter

Permanent Representative of Austria to the United Nations
- In office 7 September 1999 – November 2008
- Preceded by: Ernst Sucharipa
- Succeeded by: Thomas Mayr-Harting

Personal details
- Born: 1943 (age 82–83) Innsbruck, Germany

Gerhard Pfanzelter (born 1943) is an Austrian diplomat. He served as the Permanent Representative of Austria to the United Nations between 7 September 1999 and November 2008. In 2000 he served as Vice-President of the Economic and Social Council of the United Nations, and in 2002 he became Vice-President of the 57th United Nations General Assembly. During the first half of 2006 he chaired the European Union in New York during Austria's Presidency of the Council of the European Union.

Pfanzelter spent a year as an exchange student in at Elk River High School in Elk River, Minnesota with AFS Intercultural Programs.

He has a law degree from the University of Innsbruck and a M.A. in International Relations from Johns Hopkins University's School of Advanced International Studies.

Pfanzelter successfully led Austria's campaign for a non-permanent seat on the Security Council for the period 2009–2010.

Previously, from 1983 to 1989, Pfanzelter had served as Austria's Ambassador to Senegal, Gambia, Cape Verde, Guinea-Bissau, Mali, Guinea and Mauritania. He then became the Ambassador to Syria for a four-year term, ending in 1993, when he became the Head of the Department for International Organizations of the Austrian Ministry for Foreign Affairs.

Pfanzelter is the longest serving Austrian Permanent Representative at the United Nations. From 2010 to 2012, he served as Secretary-General of the Central European Initiative in Trieste.

Pfanzelter is member of the board of the Foreign Policy and United Nations Association of Austria (UNA-AUSTRIA).

Pfanzelter was President of the Vienna International School Association in Vienna but resigned after just 10 months in 2020.

== Personal life ==
Pfanzelter is married to Andrea Pfanzelter, an Austrian diplomat and international relations professional who served as Senior Director of the International Peace Institute (IPI) Vienna office from 2010 to 2016.

=== Connection to Epstein files ===
The International Peace Institute disclosed in October 2020 that it had received $650,000 in donations from Epstein-affiliated foundations between October 2011 and May 2019, representing 0.9% of the organization's total revenue during that period. Following public disclosure of these financial ties, IPI President Terje Rød-Larsen resigned, and the organization committed to donating an equivalent amount to programs supporting victims of human trafficking and sexual violence.
