= Peter Jankowitsch =

Austrian diplomat and politician

Peter Jankowitsch (German pronunciation: [ˈpeːtɐ ˈjaŋkoˌvɪtʃ]; born July 10, 1933) is a former Austrian diplomat and politician who served as the Permanent Representative of Austria to the United Nations.

== Biography ==
He was born in Vienna, Austria. A law graduate, he is a member of the Austrian Social Democratic Party (SPÖ). From 1983 to 1986, 1987 to 1990 and 1992 to 1993 he was a member of the Nationalrat, from 1986 to 1987 Federal Minister of Foreign Affairs. From 1990 to 1992 he joined the government again as a secretary of state in the Federal Chancellery. From 1993 to 1998 he was Austria's ambassador at the OECD in Paris. He is a former member of the Steering Committee of the Bilderberg Group.

== See also ==
- Ernst Fasan
