= Metalaw =

Concept of space law

Metalaw is “the entire sum of legal rules regulating relationships between different races in the universe.” It is a concept of space law closely related to the scientific Search for Extraterrestrial Intelligence (SETI). The idea is an elaboration of Immanuel Kant's Categorical imperative "Act only according to that maxim whereby you can at the same time will that it should become a universal law."

== Andrew Haley and the origin of Metalaw ==
First articulated by attorney Andrew G. Haley in 1956, Metalaw was the term Haley coined to refer to his hypothesis regarding the proposed existence of fundamental legal precepts of theoretically universal application to all intelligences, both human and hypothesized intelligent extraterrestrial life. Writer Frank G. Anderson proposed that the definition be expanded to cover all intelligent species, extraterrestrial and terrestrial - which would include any/all intelligent animal life.

In 1956, Haley first published an article entitled “Space Law and Metalaw – A Synoptic View”, in which Haley first proposed what he called an “Interstellar Golden Rule”: Do unto others as they would have you do unto them. According to Haley, humans can project only one principle of human law onto our possible future relations with extraterrestrial intelligence: “the stark concept of absolute equity.” Haley developed his formulation of Metalaw somewhat further in various papers and a 1963 book.

== Elaboration by Ernst Fasan ==
Significant elaboration of Haley's ideas did not take place until the publication in 1970 of Relations with Alien Intelligences: The Scientific Basis of Metalaw, written by Dr. Ernst Fasan.

In Relations with Alien Intelligences, Fasan proposed Metalaw is “the entire sum of legal rules regulating relationships between different races in the universe.” Metalaw is the “first and basic ‘law’ between races” providing the “ground rules” for a relationship if and when humans establish communication with or encounter an intelligent extraterrestrial race elsewhere in the universe. Fasan asserted that these rules would govern both human conduct and that of extraterrestrial races so as to avoid mutually harmful activities.

In later papers published in the 1990s that more directly related Metalaw to SETI, Fasan proposed a simple 3-prong formula of metalegal principles. That formula involves:

1. A prohibition on damaging the other race.
2. The right of a race to self-defense.
3. The right to adequate living space.

== Criticism of Metalaw ==
Several authors have criticized the metalegal principles proposed by Haley and Fasan for their reliance on Immanuel Kant's Categorical Imperative and on an approach to legal science and jurisprudence known as natural law theory. In jurisprudence, natural law theory refers generally to the view that links law to morality and proposes that just laws are immanent in nature and independent of the lawgiver, waiting to be discovered or found (as opposed to created by humans), usually by means of reason alone.

Other commentators have noted that Haley's formulation of Metalaw depends heavily upon subjective or relative (and therefore inadequate) concepts of “good” and “bad.” Critics have noted that there is no guarantee that other civilizations would abide by Haley's assertions regarding equity among intelligent races in the universe. Haley's failure to acknowledge the obvious anthropocentric limits of natural law theory has led some to note that the cultural concept of rules or law is itself anthropocentric.

== Metalaw in popular culture ==
In Have Space Suit — Will Travel, a 1958 story by science fiction author Robert A. Heinlein and published two years after Haley's 1956 paper, one of the characters mentions “space law and meta-law."

G. Harry Stine (under his pen-name Lee Correy) wrote a short novel on the topic — "A Matter of Metalaw" (DAW Books, October 1986).
