= Andrew G. Haley =

American lawyer (1904–1966)

- Born: Andrew Gallagher Haley; November 19, 1904; Tacoma, Washington, US
- Died: September 11, 1966 (aged 61); Washington, D.C., US
- Education: Georgetown University; George Washington University
- Occupation: Lawyer
- Years active: 1929-1966
- Known for: space law and telecommunications
- Spouse: Delphine Delacroix
- Children: 2

Andrew Gallagher Haley (November 19, 1904 – September 11, 1966) was an American lawyer. He devoted much of his legal career to federal administrative law, principally communications law. Haley has been described as the world's first practitioner of space law. He coined the term Metalaw, which refers to a field of legal thought now closely related to the scientific Search for Extraterrestrial Intelligence (SETI).

== Childhood ==
Haley was born in Tacoma, Washington, the sixth of nine children. A neighboring retired professor of astronomy aroused Haley’s interest in the moon, stars, and planets, and he wrote fictional accounts of outer space which amused his teachers and friends. As a teenager, he was employed by the Tacoma News Tribune in a variety of capacities, which sharpened his writing skills. Through his newspaper experience, Haley was introduced to several congressmen and senators who would influence his career path.

== Education and early career ==
In 1923 Haley entered college at Georgetown University in Washington, DC. While a student he worked with Senator Clarence Dill of Washington in the preparation of the Radio Act of 1927 (and later assisted the senator with the Communications Act of 1934). After five years of parallel undergraduate and law studies, Haley earned his law degree in 1928. He returned to Tacoma, serving as staff assistant to the General Manager of Pacific Telephone & Telegraph in 1929, and as a secretary to Washington State First District Congressman Ralph Horr (Rep.) in 1931-32. Haley returned to Washington, DC, in 1932 to serve as administrative assistant to Washington State Sixth District Congressman Wesley Lloyd (Dem.). The following year, he was appointed to an attorney position in the Federal Radio Commission. He transitioned to the Law Department of the Federal Communications Commission after its formation in 1934. There he was remembered as the nemesis of broadcasters who touted illegal products on the air such as goat gland implants, cancer cures, and birth control drugs. In 1934 he also earned a Bachelor of Arts degree from George Washington University.

== Law partnerships ==
In 1940, Haley and FCC Assistant General Counsel George B. Porter left the Commission to form a private law partnership representing broadcasters in matters before the FCC. They dissolved the partnership in 1944, and Haley continued to practice on his own.

In 1948 the firm of Haley, McKenna and Wilkinson was formed, with broadcast lawyers James A. McKenna, Jr., and Vernon L. Wilkinson. Among the non-broadcast, federal administrative law cases the firm prosecuted throughout the decade of the 40s was an application for a license from the Federal Power Commission to build a dam, reservoir, and hydro-electric power plant on the Cedar River near Moscow, Iowa. The case went all the way to the Supreme Court and back, before agency approval was sustained in 1950 by the U.S. Court of Appeals for the Eighth Circuit.

In 1954, Haley’s nephew, Michael Haley Bader, joined the firm as an associate attorney. A law graduate of George Washington University, Bader had clerked for his uncle while a student. Bader became a name partner in 1959, with Haley and communications lawyer Roger Wollenberg forming Haley, Wollenberg and Bader. Wollenberg departed in 1962, and associate attorney William J. Potts, Jr., was elevated to name partner status. The firm became Haley, Bader and Potts, and remained so beyond Haley’s death in September 1966, until its partners joined the Washington office of Seattle-based Garvey, Schubert & Barer in 2000.

== Broadcasting ==
Having represented broadcasters through the decade of the 40s, Haley became one himself. In June 1947, the FCC granted him a construction permit to build a new Class A FM station at Pasadena, California, to operate on 98.3 megaHertz (megacycles, at the time), with 420 watts effective radiated power. The station was issued the call sign KAGH, an obvious allusion to Haley’s initials.

KAGH went on the air June 15, 1947. It scheduled a "formal opening" on August 20, at the Pasadena Civic Auditorium, anticipating an expected attendance of more than 3,000 persons, with movies, speeches by government officials, Hollywood entertainers, and a dance following the show. A full-page advertisement in Broadcasting-Telecasting Magazine titled "Editorial: KAGH's Report to the Industry on FM in Los Angeles County", reported that every seat in the venue was taken, "and hundreds listened in the Gold Room and other hundreds were turned away."

In October 1947, the FCC granted Haley a construction permit to build a new AM station at Pasadena, to operate on 1300 kiloHertz (then, kilocycles), with transmitter power of one kilowatt. It inherited the KAGH call sign.

In 1949 the FM station call sign was changed to KARS. Haley sold the stations that year.

== Aerojet ==
In the early days of jet-assisted takeoff (JATO), engineers including Theodore von Kármán decided to form Aerojet Corporation to provide a business structure to their activities. In 1942, von Kármán called on Haley to help with the incorporation. Haley said he was busy with a case before the Federal Power Commission. In a gesture of quid pro quo, von Kármán's team provided evidence to win Haley's case before the Commission, and Haley went to California to draw up the articles of incorporation.

When financing from the Air Force was interrupted, General Benjamin Chidlaw told von Kármán, "Find somebody who knows something about doing business with Washington and send him here." Haley's knowledge of the business and legal training made him the man for the job. But he was in uniform at Military Affairs Division of Judge Advocate General's Corps, U.S. Air Force. Von Kármán worked his way up the chain of command to General Arnold who dismissed Haley for civilian duty at Aerojet.

Haley became Areojet's second president on August 26, 1942. The company expanded quickly, but needed capital, so Haley contacted William F. O'Niel, president of General Tire and his vice-president Dan A. Kimball. A line of credit was offered and in January 1945 General Tire bought half the stock of Aerojet.

Aerojet’s JATO rockets were a phenomenal success. Thousands were manufactured for military and civilian aircraft, including commercial airliners. Aerojet developed liquid- and solid-fuel rocket power plants used in projects such as the Titan that carried NASA’s Gemini astronauts into Earth orbit.

Haley left Aerojet to become counsel to a U. S. Senate committee that was investigating the economic future of the aerospace industry. He never lost his love of rocketry, however, and has become widely known as the nation's first "space lawyer", having devoted himself, among other things, to setting up guidelines for prospective claims to the moon.

Ultimately, General Tire became interested in full ownership of the company, and pressured the remaining shareholders to sell. Haley and von Kármán sold their shares in Aerojet in 1953.

In 2013 Aerojet merged with Pratt & Whitney Rocketdyne, and is now known as Aerojet Rocketdyne.

== Space Law ==
After World War II ended, Haley became active in the International Astronautical Federation (IAF) and the American Rocket Society (ARS) (now the American Institute of Aeronautics and Astronautics (AIAA)). He served as IAF vice president from 1951 to 1953, president from 1957 to 1959, and general counsel from 1959 to 1966. He also served as ARS vice president in 1953, president in 1954, and counsel from 1955 to 1963.

In 1956, Haley published an article titled "Space Law and Metalaw – A Synoptic View,” in which he first proposed his “Interstellar Golden Rule”: Do unto others as they would have you do unto them. Haley theorized that only one principle of human law can be projected onto our possible future relations with an extraterrestrial intelligence: "the stark concept of absolute equity."

In 1963 Appleton-Century-Crofts published Haley's Space Law and Government, with forewords contributed by Lyndon Johnson (then Vice President), House Majority Leader Carl Albert, and California Congressman George P. Miller. Haley acknowledged the "analytical capacity of Robert D. Crane and his unexcelled ability to quickly assemble source material"(page xv). The chapters considered the promise and challenge of space, traditional bases of international law, national consent to overflight, limits of national sovereignty, sovereignty over celestial bodies, space vehicle regulations, space communications, liability for personal and property damages, space medical jurisprudence, intergovernmental organizations, and non-governmental organizations. Reviews were published by Alan V. Washburn in American Journal of Legal History and Carol Q. Christol in Southern California Law Review (both in 1964), by Stephen E. Doyle in Duke Law Journal (1965) and by L.F.E. Goldie in Georgetown Law Journal (1966).

In his 1967 autobiography, von Kármán tells of his trip to Moscow where he met with Ivan Bardin. At the time he was unaware of early rocketry in Russia, and only by Haley's graces later was he brought up to speed:

My friend, space lawyer Andrew G. Haley, who likes to explore historical questions as a hobby, later told me that it is likely that the Russians – and not the Germans as is popularly supposed – founded the first rocket society in the world. At least Moscow had an interplanetary travel group as early as 1924, and three years later, at the time the Germans founded their first rocket society, the Russians were hosts to the first International Exhibition of Space Navigation. In 1928 and during the following four years Professor Nikolai Rynin published a formidable nine-volume encyclopedia entitled Interplanetary Communications. It was the first authoritative summary of man's knowledge of space travel.

Haley, along with his friend and colleague Ernst Fasan, was instrumental in founding both the International Academy of Astronautics and the International Institute of Space Law.

The Astronautics Award, created in 1954, was renamed the Haley Astronautics Award in Haley's honor in 1993. Now known as the Haley Space Flight Award, it is presented biennially.

== Telecommunications ==
Haley's expertise in FCC regulation led to his involvement in the non-broadcast telecommunications arena. He served as legal advisor for the International Telecommunications Conference held in Atlantic City, New Jersey in 1947, and the Fourth International American Radio Conference, held in Washington, DC, in 1949. He was an industry advisor at the American Regional Broadcasting Conference in 1949 and 1950.

== Death ==
Haley died September 10, 1966, at Georgetown University Hospital in Washington, DC, following an operation for a perforated ulcer. A lieutenant colonel in the U.S. Air Force Reserve, Haley was interred at Arlington National Cemetery with full military honors after a requiem mass at Ft. Myer (Va.) Chapel.
