= Jan Kickert =

Austrian Permanent Representative to the United Nations

Ambassador Mag. Jan Kickert

Permanent Representative of Austria to the United Nations
- In office 2015–2020
- Preceded by: Martin Sajdik
- Succeeded by: Alexander Marschik

Personal details
- Born: September 19, 1964 (age 62) Bangkok, Thailand
- Spouse: Latica Tomašić Kickert (m.2015)
- Relations: Jennifer Kickert (sister)
- Education: University of Vienna; Diplomatic Academy of Vienna
- Occupation: Diplomat

Jan Kickert (born 19 September 1964) is an Austrian diplomat, currently serving as Austrian Ambassador in Rome.

Previously, he served as the Austrian Permanent Representative to the United Nations and political director at the Austrian Ministry of Foreign Affairs.

He was born in Thailand, studied at the University of Vienna and the Diplomatic Academy of Vienna, and served in a variety of diplomatic and international positions in his early career.

== Early life ==
He was born in Bangkok, Thailand. Kickert studied at the University of Vienna in Austria. He then studied at the Diplomatic Academy of Vienna.

== Diplomatic career ==
Kickert served in a variety of diplomatic and international positions in his early career. From 1996 to 1997 Kickert worked at the Austrian Embassy in Bratislava (Slovakia) as an Attaché, from 1997 to 1999 at the Austrian Embassy in Belgrade (FRY) as 2nd Secretary, from 1998 to 1999 he Seconded as Special Assistant to the EU Special Envoy to Kosovo, and from 1999 to 2000 he Seconded as Political Advisor to the Special Representative of the Secretary-General of the United Nations Interim Administration Mission in Kosovo (Kosovo). From 2001 to 2004 he worked at the Austrian Embassy Ottawa as Minister-Counselor and DHM, from 2005 to 2007 he worked in the Cabinet of the Austrian Minister for Foreign Affairs, and from 2007 to 2009 he was Deputy Head of Cabinet of the Minister for Foreign Affairs. From 2009 to 2011 he was Ambassador Extraordinary and Plenipotentiary of the Republic of Austria to the Republic of Croatia, and from 2011 to 2015 he was Director General for Political Affairs/Austrian MfA.

=== Austrian Permanent Representative to the United Nations ===
From 2015 to 2020, Kickert has been the Austrian Permanent Representative to the United Nations.

In October 2017 Kickert denounced as “wrong and unjustifiable” a possible move by the U.S. administration to “decertify” Iran's compliance with the Iran deal known as the Joint Comprehensive Plan of Action.

In 2017-19 Kickert was Chairman of the United Nations Committee on Information, a subsidiary body of the United Nations General Assembly established to deal with questions relating to public information. The Committee oversees the work of the United Nations Department of Global Communications.

In October 2018, after the synagogue shooting at the Tree of Life – Or L'Simcha Congregation in Pittsburgh, Kickert addressed the Temple Israel congregation in New York City and said: "The attack on the Tree of Life Congregation was an attack on all of us, on what we stand for – religious liberty, human rights. We are committed to the safety and security of Jews wherever they are. I say this with growing up and living with the shame that my forefathers were among the worst perpetrators in Nazi times."

On 30 October 2018, the President of the UN General Assembly María Fernanda Espinosa Garcés informed UN Member States that Kickert and Doma Tsherin, Permanent Representative of Bhutan, would co-facilitate the intergovernmental negotiations related to the midterm review of the Vienna Declaration and Programme of Action implementation, with a view to producing a political declaration.
