= Emanuel Treu =

Austrian jurist

Emanuel Treu (August 8, 1915 – August 13, 1976) was a leader of the Austrian Resistance during World War Two and an ambassador of the Republic of Austria in the post-war period.

== Youth ==
Born in Vienna to a wealthy stamp manufacturer and his wife, Emanuel ("Mundi") Treu studied law at the University of Vienna after graduating from high school in 1933 and doing his military service. He came from a family of strict opponents of national socialism, and was arrested after the annexation of Austria to the German Reich due to his refusal to participate in the establishment of the Hitler Youth as a scout leader. He was severely tortured at the Hotel Metropole, Vienna, the Gestapo's headquarters.

== Escape and internment ==
Before successfully being transferred to a concentration camp, Treu escaped from Austria to Switzerland. He was, however, arrested at the request of the authorities of the German Reich, and held in various internment camps located in Switzerland, e.g. Davesco, Girenbad, Gordoa, Locarno, Vouvry.

He was nevertheless able to complete his studies when his internment conditions were relaxed, and he continued his studies at the Graduate Institute of International Studies in Geneva, where he obtained a degree in international law in 1945.

== Resistance ==
In 1942, Treu's conditions of internment were further relaxed so that he could move freely in Switzerland. As a result, he joined the Austrian resistance and became one of the central figures of the O5 movement in Switzerland. In 1944, he became head of the "Austria Student Association" in Geneva. Thereafter, Treu repeatedly crossed the border to what was then the Ostmark (Austria) to establish contact with Austrian resistance fighters. Sworn to non-violence, he always refused to shoot at people. His work focused on political goals; he was involved in early negotiations with the Allies over the post-war status of Austria, tasks which Fritz Molden and his circle were able to carry on.

== Return to liberated Austria ==
After his return to Vienna, he was taken on by the Austrian Ministry of Foreign Affairs in 1946 because of his proven reliability during the war and his international contacts. He became a staff member of State Secretary and later Federal Chancellor Bruno Kreisky. In this role, he worked on treaty negotiations that finally helped grant Austria independence in 1955.

== Career in the ministry of foreign affairs of the Second Republic ==
His diplomatic career took him to the former Yugoslavia in 1947 where with the help of his language teacher and future wife, he successfully located the Wehrmacht's Austrian prisoners of war, upon which Josip Broz Tito freed them before their transfer to the Soviet Union.

His career also took him to Great Britain, Brazil and then to Colombia, where he opened the first Austrian embassies to Colombia and to Switzerland. He was subsequently made the Austrian permanent representative to the United Nations in Geneva, an ambassadorial position he held from 1960 to 1966. While in Geneva, he worked on the General Agreement on Tariffs and Trade and with the European Free Trade Association. He later became minister plenipotentiary.

Treu is considered one of the fathers of Austria's accession to the European Community and was a teacher to many successful diplomats (Manfred Scheich, Gregor Woschnagg, etc.).

In 1968, when he returned to Vienna, he founded a new department in the Foreign Office, the "Office for International Organizations and Conferences" (today Department II.5 "International Organizations"), which he initially headed. Soon after, he became an official of the United Nations Industrial Development Organization (UNIDO) and the United Nations International Atomic Energy Agency (IAEA) for several years, advising the directors of these two organizations; he was also responsible for the construction of the Vienna International Centre, the campus and building complex hosting the United Nations Office at Vienna.

== Later career and death ==
In 1975, Treu became director of the Diplomatic Academy of Vienna, where he had many years prior taught prospective diplomats. He initiated the modernization of this institution, but died unexpectedly in 1976 at the age of 61. He was buried at the Vienna Central Cemetery.

== Family and children ==
He had two sons with his second wide, Christina Popovic. They are Thomas Treu and Martin "Timmy" Treu.
