= Diplomatic Academy of Vienna =

Austrian postgraduate school

- Diplomatische Akademie Wien
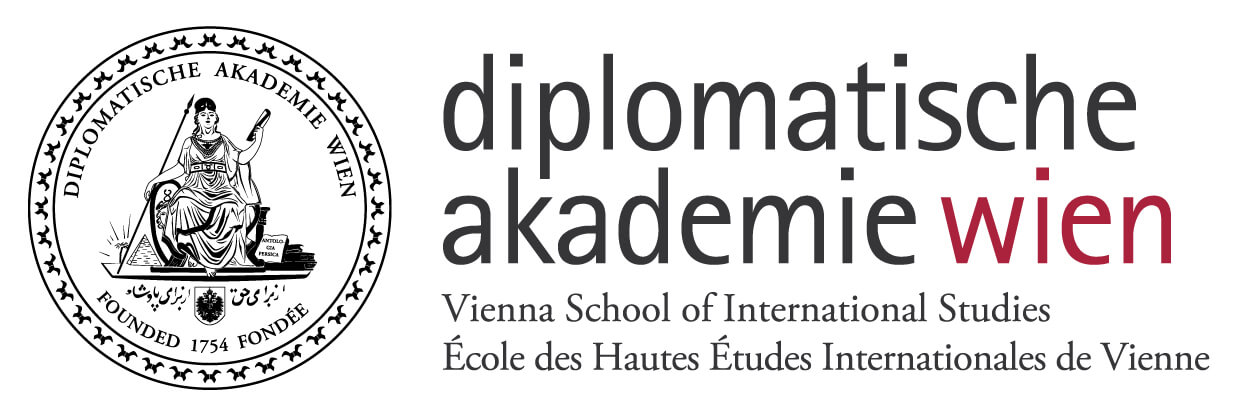
- Current logo of the Diplomatic Academy of Vienna (since July 2017)
- Motto: diplomacymatters
- Type: Independent public postgraduate institution
- Established: January 1, 1754 (as the Oriental Academy); June 1, 1964 (as the Diplomatic Academy of Vienna); 1996 (granted independent public institution status)
- Affiliations: University of Vienna · Vienna University of Technology · University of Innsbruck · APSIA
- Director: Ambassador Martin Eichtinger (since 2025)
- Faculty: 96
- Students: ~220 (2025)
- Location: Vienna, Austria
- Campus: Urban (Theresianum, 4th district)
- Website: www.da-vienna.ac.at

The Diplomatic Academy of Vienna (German: Diplomatische Akademie Wien, DA), also known as the Vienna School of International Studies, is an Austrian independent public postgraduate institution located in the 4th district of Vienna, within the former imperial summer residence of the Theresianum.

The direct successor of the Oriental Academy founded on 1 January 1754 by Empress Maria Theresa, it is one of the oldest schools dedicated to the study of international relations in the world. The school is an affiliate member of the Association of Professional Schools of International Affairs (APSIA). Since the law of 13 March 1996, it has held the status of an autonomous public institution under Austrian public law, independent of direct ministerial supervision. Its director since August 2025 is Ambassador Martin Eichtinger, succeeding Ambassador Emil Brix, who served from 2017 to 2025.

The Academy prepares university graduates of all nationalities for careers in diplomacy, international public service, international organizations, the European Union, and the internationally oriented private sector. Its teaching, conducted in English, French and German, focuses on international relations, international and European law, international economics and history, in a resolutely multidisciplinary approach.

== History ==
=== Refoundation (1964) ===
The Austrian State Treaty of 15 May 1955 and Austria's admission to the United Nations on 13 December 1955 finally enabled the young Republic to rebuild a worldwide diplomatic and consular network. In 1959, foreign affairs were separated from the Federal Chancellery and the Federal Ministry for Foreign Affairs was created. Its minister, Bruno Kreisky, took up the ideas of some former graduates of the Consular Academy and established in 1963 a commission to plan a new postgraduate institution.

On 1 June 1964, Kreisky signed the founding document of the Diplomatische Akademie Wien. The first students moved into the Consular Wing of the Theresianum on 11 January 1965 — nearly 211 years to the day after the first students of the Oriental Academy, and in the very same premises it had occupied from 1883 to 1904. Kreisky appointed as first director Professor Ernst Florian Winter, an Austro-American historian and political scientist who had emigrated to the United States in 1938 and had taught notably at Columbia University. Winter introduced new pedagogical methods — Anglo-Saxon-style seminars, UN conference simulations, game theory — and reinforced language training with tutors and a modern language laboratory.

=== Institutional developments (1964–1996) ===
In 1967, the Austrian Parliament enshrined the Academy's existence through legislation providing it with a legal framework. The following decades were marked by a succession of directors drawn from the Austrian diplomatic corps, and by recurring debates about the positioning of the institution: too closely tied to the Ministry of Foreign Affairs, the Academy struggled to recruit internationally recognised teaching staff and to have its degrees academically recognised. Between 1979 and 1983, the Lower Stöckel Wing, destroyed during the war, was renovated, providing the campus with a large ceremonial hall, a restaurant and an expanded library. After the fall of the Berlin Wall in 1989, the Academy played a pioneering role in organising training programmes for diplomats from the former Eastern Bloc states, anticipating its historic regional vocation.

=== Autonomy (1996) ===
Director Paul Leifer (1994–1999) carried out the most structural reform since the refoundation. The law passed on 13 March 1996, entering into force on 1 July 1996, transformed the Academy into an autonomous institution under Austrian public law, independent of direct supervision by the Ministry of Foreign Affairs. A Board of Trustees was established, in which the Ministry remains represented. The curriculum was restructured around an intensive one-year diploma, supplemented by a master's degree in cooperation with the University of Vienna. In 2006, a legislative amendment allowed the academic recognition of the Master of Advanced International Studies (MAIS) title, jointly accredited with the University of Vienna in accordance with the Bologna Declaration of 1999.

== Programmes ==
The Diplomatic Academy of Vienna offers five postgraduate programmes:

- the Diploma Programme (Diplomlehrgang, DLG);
- the Master of Advanced International Studies (MAIS), in partnership with the University of Vienna;
- the MSc in Environmental Technology and International Affairs (ETIA), in partnership with the Vienna University of Technology;
- the MSc in Digital International Affairs (DIA), in partnership with the University of Innsbruck;
- the PhD in Interdisciplinary International Studies (IIS).

Teaching is conducted primarily in English, with courses also offered in French and German. The Academy also provides tailor-made training programmes for governmental institutions and international organisations.

=== Diploma Programme (DLG) ===
The Diploma Programme (Diplomlehrgang, DLG) is the Academy's flagship programme, created simultaneously with its reopening in 1964. A full-time one-year course (60 ECTS credits), it is open to university graduates of any discipline and nationality. It combines theoretical training in international relations with practical professional skills training (rhetoric, negotiation, crisis management, media communication) and intensive language instruction in English, French and German. For Austrian nationals without a degree in law, political science or economics, the diploma constitutes the formal prerequisite for entry into the competitive examination of the Federal Ministry for European and International Affairs.

=== Master of Advanced International Studies (MAIS) ===
The Master of Advanced International Studies (MAIS) is a two-year master's programme (120 ECTS credits), jointly accredited with the University of Vienna since 2006, in accordance with the standards of the Bologna Process. Open to university graduates of any discipline and nationality, it awards an academically recognised master's degree, the completion of which requires the submission of a thesis. The programme is interdisciplinary and combines the four core domains of the Academy (international relations, international and European law, international economics and history) in a strongly academic approach.

=== MSc in Environmental Technology and International Affairs (ETIA) ===
Launched in October 2007 in partnership with the Vienna University of Technology, the MSc in Environmental Technology and International Affairs (ETIA) is a two-year interdisciplinary programme (120 ECTS credits) combining environmental issues and international affairs. The first year takes place at the Diplomatic Academy, with courses in international law, international relations, economics and history applied to environmental challenges. The second year takes place at the Vienna University of Technology, with modules on water management, resource management, sustainable development and climate change.

=== MSc in Digital International Affairs (DIA) ===
The MSc in Digital International Affairs (DIA) is a two-year full-time interdisciplinary programme (120 ECTS credits), organised in partnership with the University of Innsbruck, which awards the degree. It prepares graduates for international careers in digital environments, combining two complementary objectives: deepening understanding of the opportunities and risks associated with digitalisation in areas such as diplomacy, law, security and economics; and developing practical skills in the application of digital technologies, including artificial intelligence and data analysis.

=== PhD in Interdisciplinary International Studies (IIS) ===
The PhD in Interdisciplinary International Studies (IIS) is the Academy's doctoral programme, aimed at researchers wishing to conduct advanced research at the intersection of international relations, law, economics and history within an interdisciplinary framework.

== Campus life ==
=== Campus and accommodation ===
The Diplomatic Academy is located in the Consular Wing of the Theresianum, the former imperial summer residence of the Favorita, in the heart of the 4th district of Vienna. The campus offers a student dormitory with individual rooms. A catering service is available on campus Monday to Friday.

Students also have access to common rooms, the student bar The Tipsy Weasel, a computer room and a garden. The bar, run by the students themselves, serves as the central meeting point on campus and hosts the weekly Tipsy Thursdays social events. The sports facilities of the neighbouring Theresianum — swimming pool, gymnasium and running track — are accessible to students under an agreement between the two institutions.

The library shared with the Federal Ministry for European and International Affairs is also located in the Academy building.

=== Student life and societies ===
Extra-curricular life is organised around the Diplomatic Academy Students Initiative (DASI), which represents students before the administration and coordinates the activities of student associations, known as societies. The Academy has more than twenty societies and committees covering diverse fields: culture, sport, debate, environment, music, gastronomy and regional representation. Among the most active are:

- the Association Francophone, representing the French-speaking community of the Academy;
- the Sports Society, which organises skiing, basketball, volleyball and swimming tournaments;
- ENSOC (DA Environmental Society), dedicated to environmental issues;
- the DAbate Society, the debate society;
- QUEER@DA, representing the LGBTQ+ community;
- SAGE (Students Advocating for Gender Equality), committed to gender equality;
- POLEMICS, the Academy's student academic magazine and podcast.

The flagship event of student life is the Diplomatic Ball, an annual charity ball organised by the student committee, which traditionally welcomes over 600 guests — ambassadors, diplomats and business leaders. Proceeds are donated each year to a charitable organisation.

=== International exchanges ===
The Academy has established several four-month exchange programmes with partner institutions for MAIS students. Each programme provides for the hosting of two students from the partner institution in Vienna, and the sending of two Academy students to the partner institution. Exchange partners include:

- Stanford University (Ford Dorsey Program in International Policy Studies), funded by the foundation of former US Ambassador to Austria, Susan McCaw;
- Korea University (Graduate School of International Studies, GSIS);
- Renmin University of China (English-language master's programme);
- the Hebrew University of Jerusalem (European Forum);
- University of Paris 1 Panthéon-Sorbonne (Magistère et Masters Relations Internationales et Action à l'Étranger, MRIAE).

=== Alumni network ===
The Academy's alumni club (club.da) brings together graduates from all cohorts and programmes in a global network spanning more than 125 countries. It organises annual meetings and maintains active links between former students and the institution.

== Gallery ==
=== Visual identity ===
The visual identity of the Diplomatic Academy of Vienna is built around two distinct elements: the institutional logo, modernised in July 2017, and the historic seal representing Athena, the Greek goddess of wisdom, surrounded by Oriental symbols (pyramid, palm tree) and the double-headed eagle of the Habsburgs, with a Persian inscription meaning For Law and the Ruler. This seal refers to the origins of the institution as a school of Oriental languages founded in 1754.

Seal of the Diplomatic Academy of Vienna, depicting Athena surrounded by Oriental symbols and the Habsburg double-headed eagle, with the Persian motto For Law and the Ruler.

=== Logos and coat of arms ===
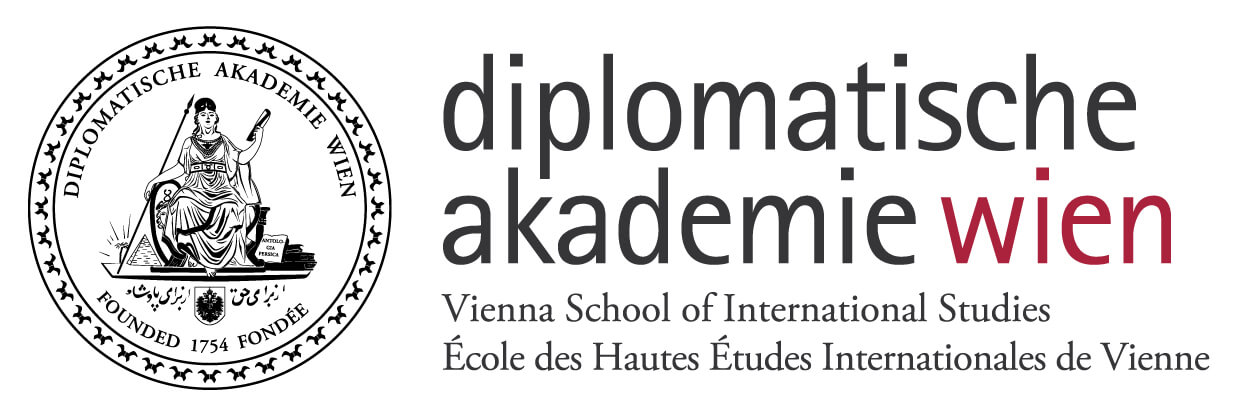
Current logo of the Academy (since July 2017).

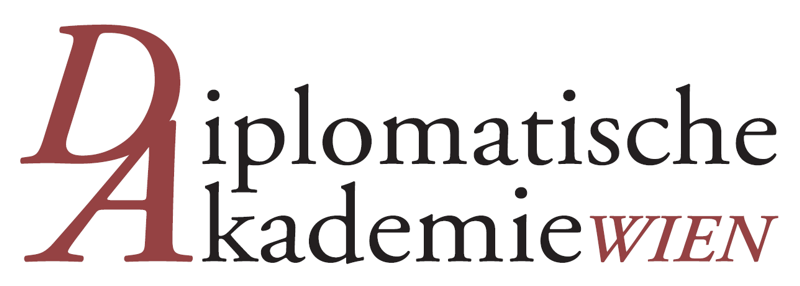
Former logo of the Academy, used before July 2017.

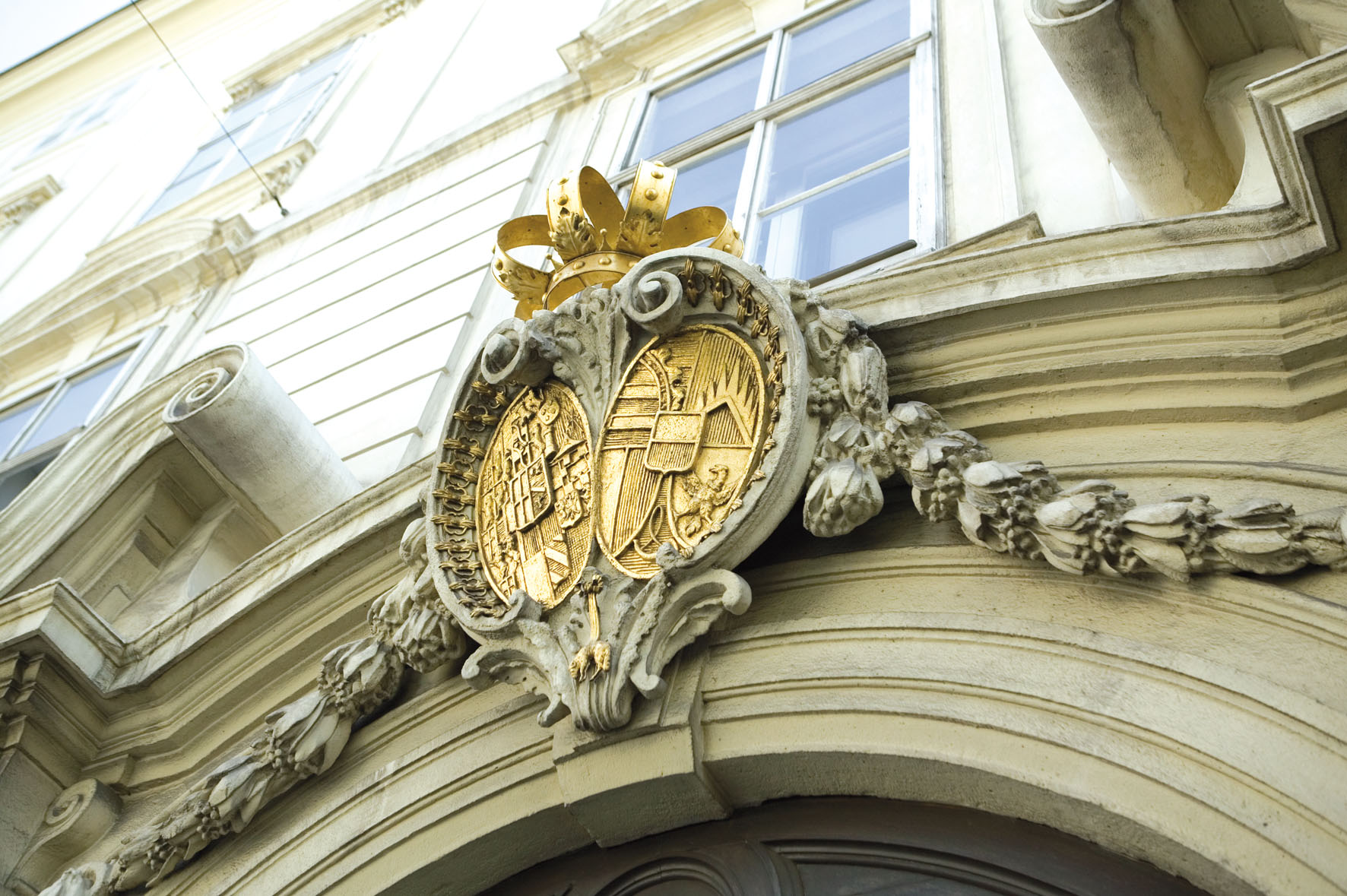
Coat of arms of the Academy, located at the entrance of the building.

=== Campus photos ===
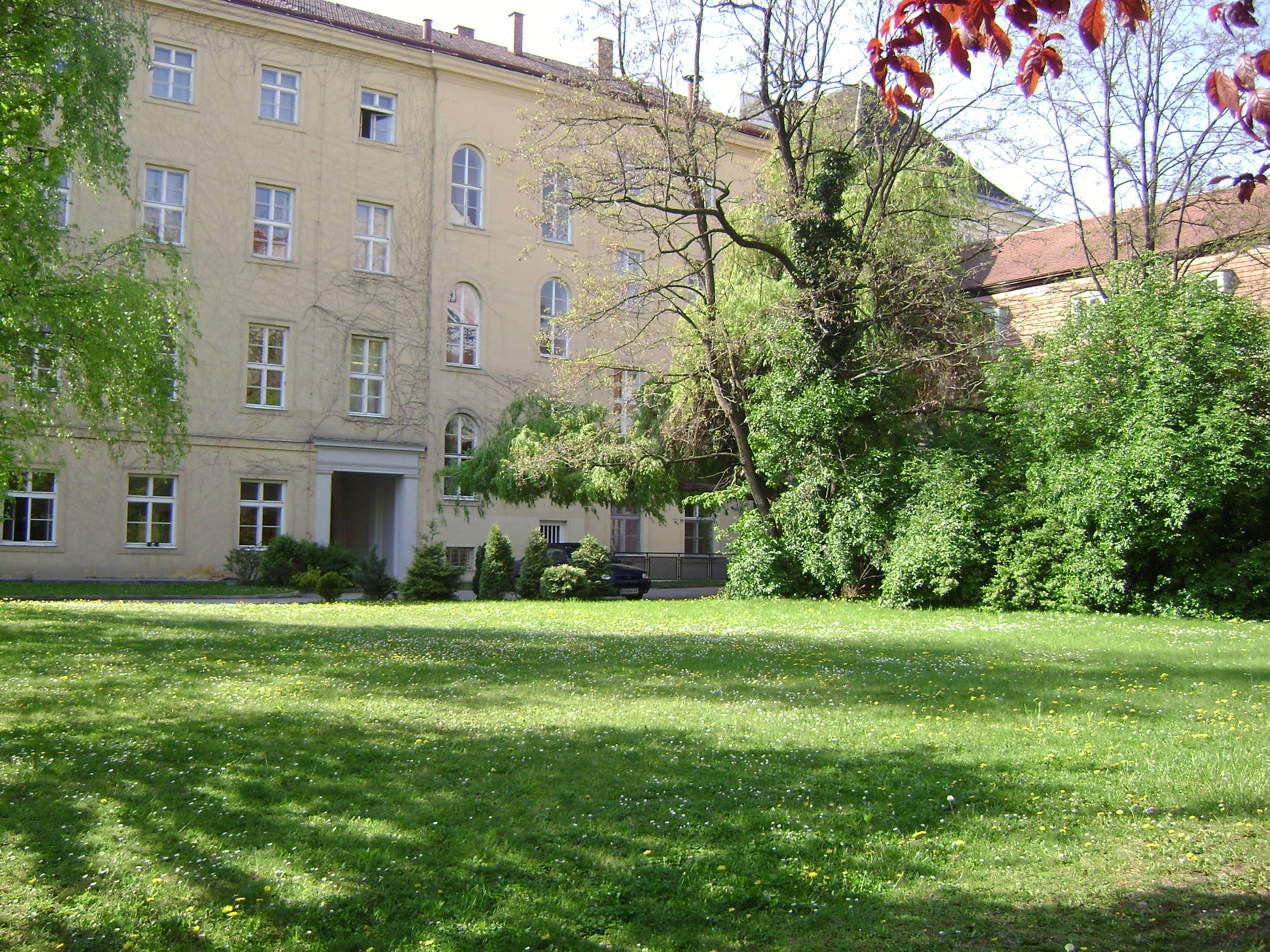
The Academy's garden.

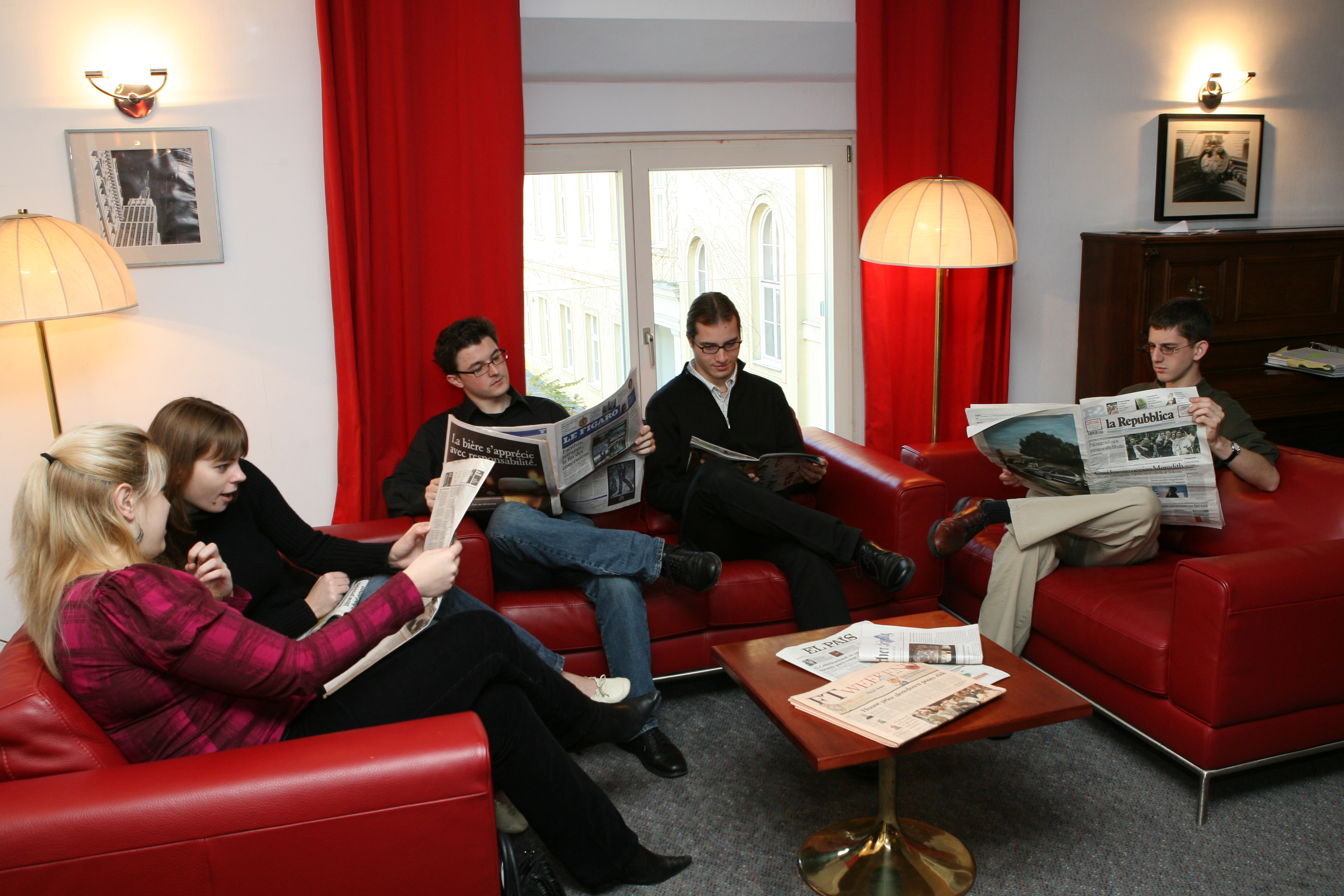
The student bar The Tipsy Weasel.

== Notable people ==
=== Directors since 1964 ===
Period	Director
1964–1967	Prof. Dr. Ernst Florian Winter
1967	Ambassador Dr. Robert Friedinger-Pranter († December 1967)
1967–1968	Ambassador Dr. Johannes Coreth
1968–1975	Ambassador Dr. Arthur Breycha-Vauthier
1975–1976	Ambassador Dr. Emanuel Treu († 1976)
1976–1977	Ambassador Dr. Arthur Breycha-Vauthier
1977–1978	Ambassador Dr. Johannes Coreth
1978–1986	Ambassador Dr. Heinrich Pfusterschmid-Hardtenstein
1986–1993	Ambassador Dr. Alfred Missong
1994–1999	Ambassador Dr. Paul Leifer
1999–2005	Ambassador Dr. Ernst Sucharipa
2005–2009	Ambassador Dr. Jiří Gruša
2009–2017	Ambassador Dr. Hans Winkler
2017–2025	Ambassador Dr. Emil Brix
since 2025	Ambassador Dr. Martin Eichtinger

=== Notable alumni ===
- Kurt Waldheim — graduated from the Consular Academy in 1939; Secretary-General of the United Nations (1972–1981) and President of Austria (1986–1992)
- Celso Amorim — graduated in 1967; Minister of Foreign Affairs of Brazil (2003–2010), Minister of Defence and Ambassador to the United Kingdom
- Valentin Inzko — graduated in 1974; Austrian diplomat, former High Representative for Bosnia and Herzegovina
- Kolinda Grabar-Kitarović — 4th President of Croatia (2015–2020)
- Igor Lukšić — graduated in 1999; Prime Minister of Montenegro (2010–2012) and Minister of Foreign Affairs (2012–2016)
- Heinz Schaden — graduated in the 1980s; Austrian Social Democratic politician and former Mayor of Salzburg
- Jan Kickert — Austrian Permanent Representative to the United Nations
- Nerys Dockery — diplomat from Saint Kitts and Nevis, former Permanent Representative to the United Nations in New York
- Zoran Kalabić — Serbian businessman, humanist and benefactor, graduated in 2012

=== Former directors who became notable personalities ===
- Jiří Gruša — Czech poet, former Czech Ambassador to Austria, director of the Academy (2005–2009)
- Heinrich Pfusterschmid-Hardtenstein — Austrian diplomat, director of the Academy (1978–1986), Ambassador to the Netherlands
- Emil Brix — Austrian diplomat and historian, director of the Academy (2017–2025)

=== Notable faculty ===
Among the professors who have taught or are teaching at the Diplomatic Academy of Vienna:

- Markus Kornprobst — Head of the Department of International Relations at the Diplomatic Academy of Vienna; former professor at the University of Oxford and University College London
- Anton Pelinka — Austrian political scientist, professor emeritus at the University of Innsbruck, specialist in democracy and the Austrian political system († 2025)
- Gerhard Mangott — Professor of political science at the University of Innsbruck, recognised expert on Russian-European relations
- Karin Kneissl — former Austrian Federal Minister of Foreign Affairs (2017–2019), expert in international law, Middle Eastern history and energy policy
- Manfred Nowak — Austrian jurist, former UN Special Rapporteur on Torture, professor of international law
- Georg Winckler — Austrian economist, former Rector of the University of Vienna (1999–2011)
- Ludger Kühnhardt — German political scientist, director of the Centre for European Integration Studies at the University of Bonn, specialist in the European Union
- Wolfgang Wessels — German political scientist, professor at the University of Cologne, specialist in European institutions
- Adam Roberts — British historian, former President of the British Academy, specialist in international humanitarian law
- Hanspeter Neuhold — Austrian jurist, specialist in public international law
- Arnold Suppan — Austrian historian, specialist in Central and Eastern European history, member of the Austrian Academy of Sciences
- Melanie Sully — British-Austrian political scientist, specialist in the Austrian political system
- Mihai Răzvan Ungureanu — Romanian historian, diplomat and statesman; former Minister of Foreign Affairs of Romania (2004–2007) and former Prime Minister of Romania (2012)
- A.J.R. Groom — British political scientist, professor of international relations at the University of Kent
- Hubert Isak — Austrian jurist, specialist in European law
- Wilhelm Kohler — economist, specialist in international economics
- Denis Mueller — specialist in international relations
- Julien Navarro — French political scientist, specialist in European institutions
- Michael Plummer — American economist, specialist in international economics and regional integration
- Arthur Rachwald — political scientist, specialist in transatlantic relations and Central Europe
- Robert Evans — British historian, specialist in Central European history
- Christian Franck — Belgian political scientist, specialist in European institutions
- Tom Row — historian, specialist in Central European history
- Erich Streißler — Austrian economist, professor at the University of Vienna

== See also ==
- Maria Theresa
- Bruno Kreisky
- Theresianum

== Bibliography ==
- Pfusterschmid-Hardtenstein, Heinrich (2008). A Short History of the Diplomatic Academy of Vienna. Training for international careers since 1754. Vienna: Diplomatische Akademie Wien. ISBN 978-3-902021-57-1.
- Rathkolb, Oliver, ed. (2004). 250 Jahre. Von der Orientalischen zur Diplomatischen Akademie in Wien. Innsbruck: StudienVerlag. ISBN 3-7065-1921-6.

=== Favorita Papers ===
- Sully, Melanie, ed. (2004). Out of Vienna. Favorita Papers. Vienna.
- Gruša, Jiří and Lederhaas, Wolfgang (eds.) (2007). Mit vereinten Kräften? Der Machtanspruch der Literatur. Favorita Papers 01/2006. Vienna.
- Kneissl, Karin; Hecht, Rudolf and Bosse, Magnus (eds.) (2006). The Energy Gamble: Securing the Future Mix of Energy. Favorita Papers 02/2006. Vienna.
- Row, Thomas, ed. (2007). Does Central Europe Still Exist? History, Economy, Identity. Favorita Papers 03/2006. Vienna.
- Sully, Melanie, ed. (2008). The Odessa Connection. Favorita Papers (special edition). Vienna.
- Sully, Melanie, ed. (2008). Black Sea Calling. Favorita Papers. Vienna.
