= Emil Brix =

Austrian diplomat and historian (born 1956)

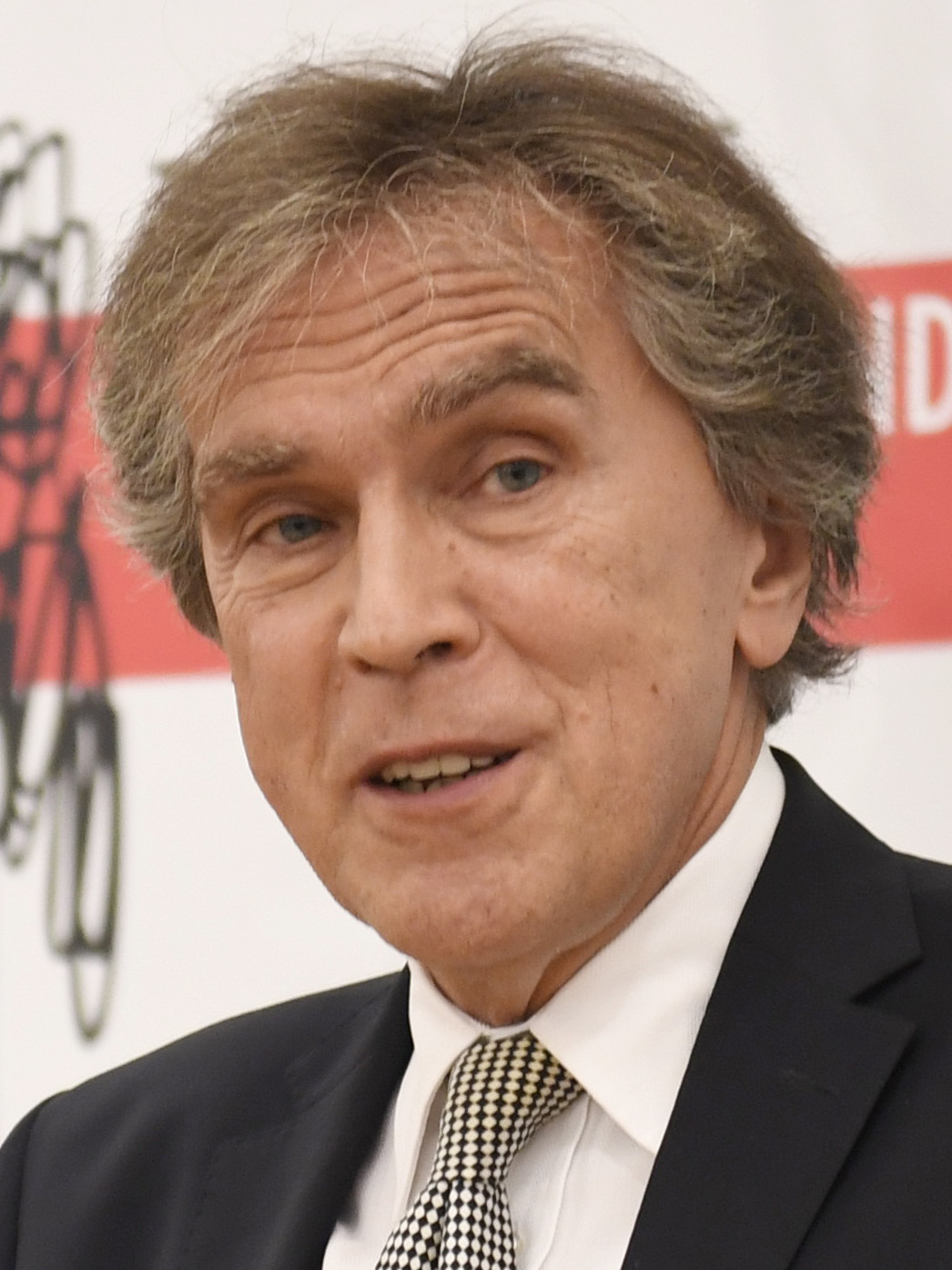
Emil Brix in October 2019

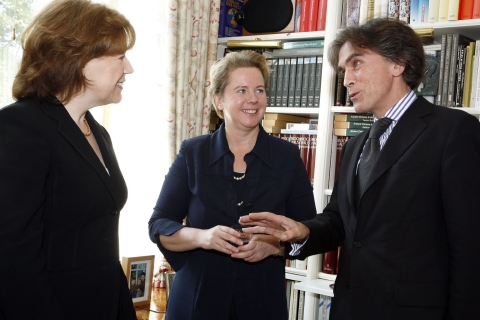
Brix in 2006 with Rita Kieber-Beck and Maria-Pia Kothbauer, Princess of Liechtenstein

Emil Brix (born 1956) is an Austrian diplomat and historian.

== Life and career ==
Born 1956 in Vienna, he studied English and History at the University of Vienna. Starting in 1982, he worked for the Foreign Service of the Republic of Austria. From 1984 to 1986, he was a secretary of the Austrian People's Party (ÖVP), and from 1986 to 1989, he worked in the office of the federal minister for science and research, Hans Tuppy.

From 1990 to 1995, he was the consul general in Kraków, and from 1995 to 1999, he was the manager of the Austrian Institute for Culture in London. Until early 2010, he was the director of the politico-cultural section of the foreign office. Between April 2010 and January 2015, Brix was the Austrian ambassador in London. On 19 January 2015, he assumed office as the Austrian ambassador in Moscow.

Brix is also the representative chairman of the Institute for the Danube Region and Central Europe. He was the director of the Diplomatic Academy of Vienna from 2017 to 2025.

== Awards ==
On 26 January 2009, Brix was awarded the golden medal Gloria Artis by Bogdan Zdrojewski, the Polish Minister of Culture and National Heritage, at the galleries of the International Culture Centre in Kraków. This medal is the highest award in Poland for people who rendered outstanding service to Polish culture in an artistic way or for the preservation of Polish cultural heritage.

== List of publications ==
- Erhard Busek, Emil Brix: Projekt Mitteleuropa. 1986
- Emil Brix/Lisa Fischer, Die Frauen der Wiener Moderne (translated as: Women of the Vienna modern spirit). 1994 ISBN 3-486-56290-8
- Urs Altermatt/Emil Brix, Schweiz und Österreich. Eine Nachbarschaft in Mitteleuropa (translated as: Switzerland and Austria. A Neighbourship in Central Europe). 1996
- Emil Brix / Wolfgang Mantl, Liberalismus. Grundlagen und Perspektiven (translated as: Liberalism. Basics and perspectives). 1996
- Emil Brix, Jürgen Nautz (Hg.): Zwischen Wettbewerb und Protektion. Zur Rolle staatlicher Macht und wettbewerblicher Freiheit in Österreich im 20. Jahrhundert. Passagen Verlag, Wien 1998, ISBN 978-3-85165-313-7
- Emil Brix (Hg.): Civil Society in Österreich. Reihe Civil Society der Österreichischen Forschungsgemeinschaft. Passagen Verlag, Wien 1998
- Emil Brix, Sigurd Paul Scheichl (Hg.): Dürfen's denn das? Die fortdauernde Frage zum Jahr 1848. Passagen Verlag, Wien 1999, ISBN 978-3-85165-355-7
- Emil Brix, Rudolf Richter (Hg.): Organisierte Privatinteressen. Vereine in Österreich. 1. Auflage. Passagen Verlag, Wien 2000, ISBN 978-3-85165-402-8.
- Emil Brix, Manfred Prisching: Persönliches und Gesellschaftliches. Ein Gespräch mit Peter L. Berger. In: Manfred Pritsching (Hg.): Gesellschaft verstehen. Peter L. Berger und die Soziologie der Gegenwart. Passagen Verlag, Wien 2001, ISBN 978-3-85165-479-0, S. 149–163
- Emil Brix, Gerhard Luf, Jürgen Nautz (Hg.): Das Rechtssystem zwischen Staat und Zivilgesellschaft. Zur Rolle gesellschaftlicher Selbstregulierung und vorstaatlicher Schlichtung. Passagen Verlag, Wien 2001, ISBN 978-3-85165-470-7
- Emil Brix, Jügen Nautz (Hg.): Universitäten in der Zivilgesellschaft. 1. Auflage. Passagen Verlag, Wien 2002, ISBN 978-3-85165-529-2 (Buchvorschau bei Libreka).
- Emil Brix, Peter Kampits (Hg.): Zivilgesellschaft zwischen Liberalismus und Kommunitarismus. 1. Auflage. Passagen Verlag, Wien 2003, ISBN 978-3-85165-573-5 (Buchvorschau bei Libreka).
- Emil Brix/ Ernst Bruckmüller / Hannes Stekl, Memoria Austriae 1 Menschen - Mythen – Zeiten (Memoria Austriae 1 Human – myth – times). 2004 ISBN 3-486-56838-8
- Emil Brix, Jürgen Nautz, Klaus Thien (Hg.): Zivilcourage. 1. Auflage. Passagen Verlag, Wien 2004, ISBN 978-3-85165-630-5 (Buchvorschau bei Libreka).
- Emil Brix, Jürgen Nautz (Hg.): Taxes, Civil Society and the State. Steuern, Zivilgesellschaft und Staat. Passagen Verlag, Wien 2006, ISBN 978-3-85165-698-5
- Emil Brix, Jürgen Nautz, Klaus Poier (Hg.): Die österreichische Verfassungsdiskussion und die Zivilgesellschaft. 1. Auflage. Passagen Verlag, Wien 2006, ISBN 978-3-85165-702-9 (Buchvorschau bei Libreka).
- Emil Brix, Jürgen Nautz, Rita Trattnigg, Werner Wutscher (Hg.): State and Civil Society. Passagen Verlag, Wien 2007, ISBN 978-3-85165-829-3
