= Matthias Kimmerl =

Austrian judge

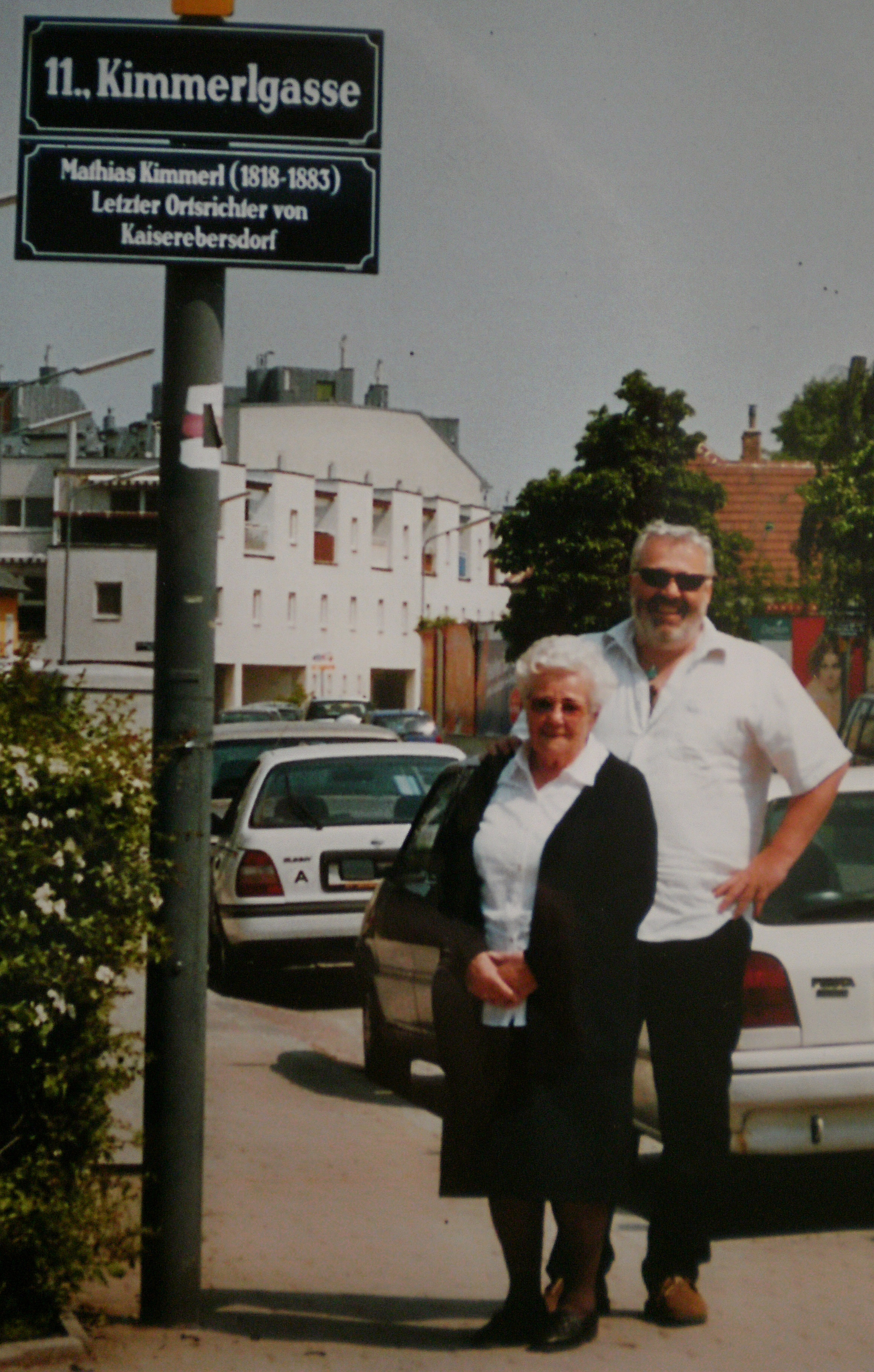
Leopoldine Gräff (born Kimmerl) and her son Helmuth Gräff at Kimmerlgasse, named by their ancestor Matthias Kimmerl

Matthias Kimmerl (* 16 June 1818 in Kaiserebersdorf; † 13 January 1883 Kaiserebersdorf) was an Austrian judge. The Viennese Kimmerlgasse was named after him.

== Life and work ==
The Kimmerl family is of Bavarian origin, "Kimmerl" used to mean "the darling" and comes from "worry", "sorrow" or "because of which one is most worried".

Matthias Kimmerl was born as the son of the landowner and business operator Matthias Kimmerl (* 1786) and Theresia Kimmerl. He took over his father's business and function in the Kaiserbersdorf community. Matthias Kimmerl was the last to fulfill the post of imperial local judge of Kaiserebersdorf, which was incorporated into the 11th Viennese district of Vienna in 1892. In 1894 the street previously called Feldgasse was renamed Kimmerlgasse. Kimmerl's son, who was also called Matthias Kimmerl, owned large grounds in the area around Kaiserebersdorf, Rannersdorf and Schwechat. They are direct ancestors of the two academic painters Helmuth Gräff and Matthias Laurenz Gräff.

== Family (selection) ==
1. Nicolaus Kimmerl ∞ with Ursula
  1. Michael Kimmerl, landowner, ∞ with Theresia Mayer
    1. Matthias Kimmerl (* 1786), landowner, ∞ with Theresia
      1. Matthias Kimmerl (1818–1883), landowner, imperial judge of Kaiserebersdorf, ∞ with Maria Sauer
        1. Matthias Kimmerl, landowner
          1. Franz Kimmerl, landowner
          2. Ferdinand Kimmerl (1886–1930) ∞ with Maria Maly (1892–1956);
            1. Ferdinand Kimmerl (1914–1949)
            2. Theresia Kimmerl (1919–2006) ∞ with Governing Council Johann Gehringer
            3. Josef Kimmerl (1921-1990), American interpreter, ∞ with Margarete Zirkelbach, Fashion illustrator
            4. Leopoldine Kimmerl (1923–2023) ∞ with Rudolf Gräff (1919–2006)
              1. Helmuth Gräff (* 1958), artist, ∞ with Martina Maria Elisabeth Gach (* 1957), daughter of Richard Gach, architect
                1. Matthias Laurenz Gräff (* 1984), artist
