= Richard Henke =

Austrian chemist and inventor (1900-1963)

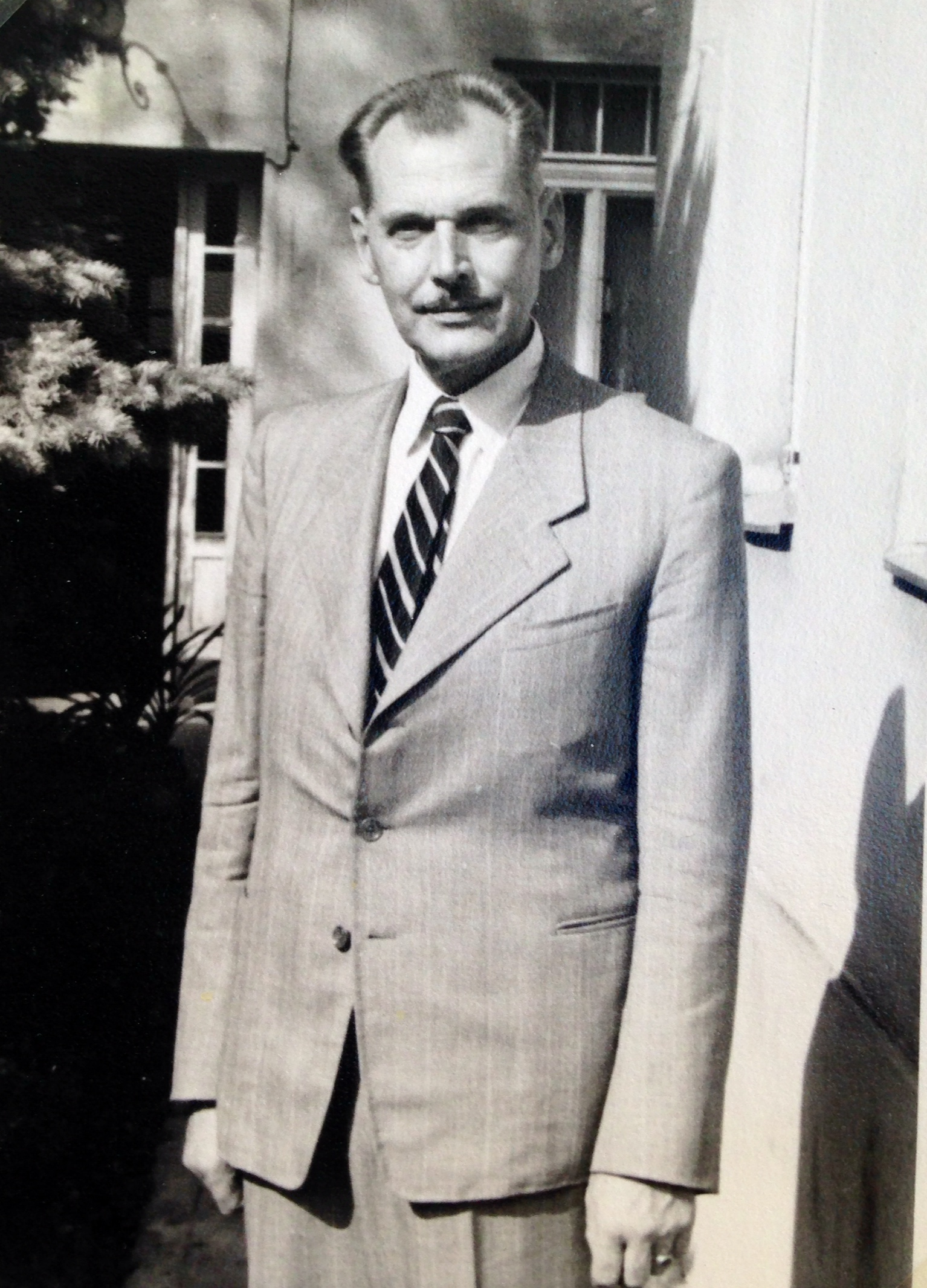
- Born: 1900; Korneuburg
- Died: 1963 (aged 62–63); Vienna
- Education: Vienna University of Technology
- Scientific career
- Fields: chemie
- Workplaces: Assistant Professor of Chemistry at the Technical University, Wander AG Vienna, director of the Higher Federal Education and Research Institute for the Chemical Industry Vienna

Richard Henke (1 February 1900 in Korneuburg – October 1963, in Vienna) was an Austrian chemist and inventor.

== Life and work ==
Richard Henke originally came from a wealthy family of silk manufacturers in the Kingdom of Saxony. The family belonged to the educated middle class and lived in a town villa in Korneuburg, which was destroyed in bombing raids during the Second World War.

Henke graduated from the Vienna University of Technology as a diplom-engineer and then as a Doktoringenieur. In the 1920s, various treatises on Molecule Relationship were co-authored with Georg Weissenberger and Fritz Schuster. These scientific papers were published in scientific journals such as Journal of Applied Chemistry, Zeitschrift für anorganische und allgemeine Chemie and the Chemisches Zentralblatt published. His work has been published in the Proceedings of the Academy of Sciences in Vienna mathematics and science class.

Richard Henke was until his leave of absence about political reasons by the National Socialists assistant professor of chemistry at the Technical University. In the late 1930s and 1940s he worked as a chemist at Wander AG in Vienna. He was able to pursue this employment despite his former Heimwehr activity even in the Nazi period. He was able to escape deportation to a concentration camp because of his high reputation as a chemical specialist. During his time at Wander, Henke also worked on the further development of the malt beverage Ovomaltine.

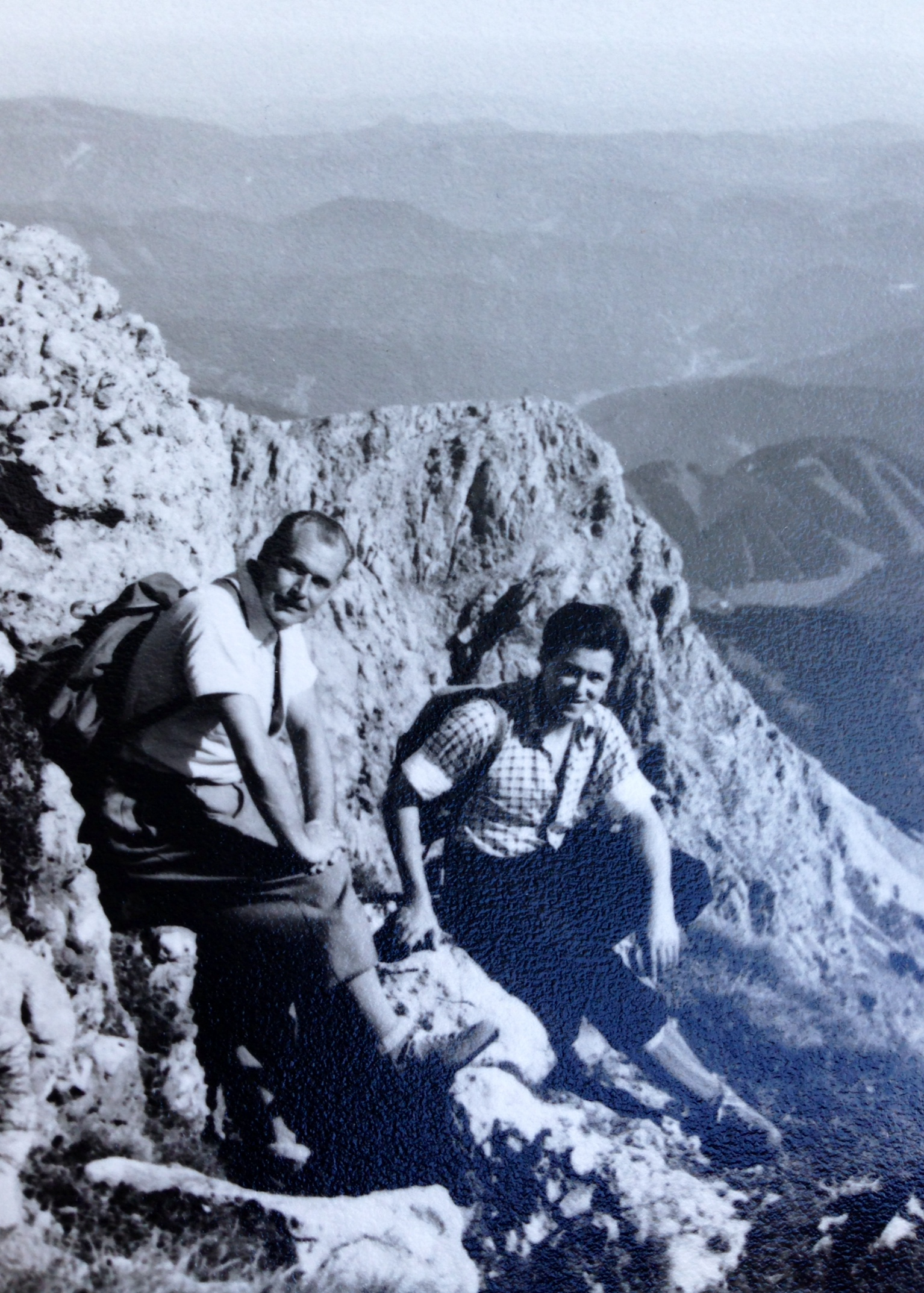
Richard Henke (left) with his son-in-law Richard Gach in Salzburg (1957/58)

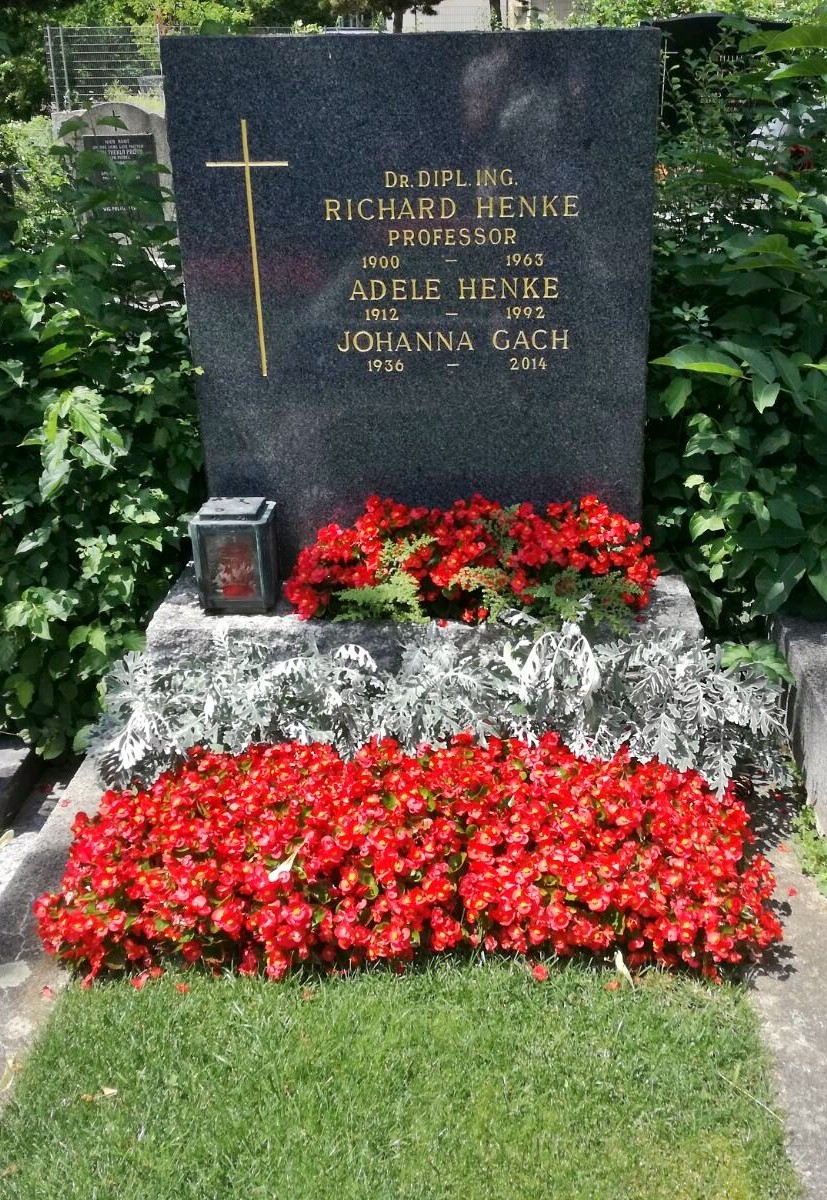
Grave of Richard Henke, Ober Sankt Veiter Friedhof, Vienna

After World War II Richard Henke directed the Evening School for Chemistry at the Viennese highschool HTL Ottakring, HTL Schellinggasse. Thereafter, Henke worked at the Higher Federal Education and Research Institute for the Chemical Industry Vienna in the research areas "Chemistry and Chemical Technology". He was in charge of the operational laboratory at the departments of mechanical engineering and electrical engineering and was the administrator of the chemical-technical laboratory. Henke also developed a shoe polish, which did not go into production. In 1963, shortly before his death, he was appointed director of the Higher Federal Education and Research Institute for the Chemical Industry. This function, however, he could no longer compete due to a sudden heart attack that led to death. Richard Henke was buried in the family grave on Ober Sankt Veiter Friedhof.

== Family ==
Richard Henke married on September 15, 1957 at Ober St. Veit to Adele Havlicek (1912-1992 in Vienna Hietzing).

Progeny (selection):

- Richard Henke married to Adele Havlicek
  - Johanna Henke, married to Richard Gach, architect
    - Martina Maria Elisabeth Gach married to Helmuth Gräff, artist, poet
      - Matthias Laurenz Gräff, artist, historian, political activist

== Awards ==
- Regierungsrat
- Professor

== Publications and Works (selection) ==
- 1958: Kunststoffe stellen sich vor, Gesellschaft für Natur und Technik, in Universum: Natur und Technik, Band 13, S. 332–335.
- 1956: Stoffe aus Aschantinüssen, Gesellschaft für Natur und Technik, in Universum: Natur und Technik, Band 11, ab S. 344.
- Über arithmetische Zahlenfolgen höherer Ordnung.
- 1926: Zur Kenntnis binärer Flüssigkeitsgemische. Einige neue Konstanten 115, 75. In: Journal für praktische Chemie (1939)
- with Fanny Kawenoki: Systeme mit Nitrobenzol u. Oxynitrobenzolen 113, 171. In: Journal für praktische Chemie (1939)
- with Fritz Schuster: Betrachtungen über den Dampfdruck 113, 180. In: Journal für praktische Chemie (1939)
- with Georg Weissenberger and Fritz Schuster (1926): Zur Kenntnis organischer Molekülverbindungen. XVIII. Wege zur Berechnung des Molbruche. In: Zeitschrift für anorganische und allgemeine Chemie, Volume 152, Issue 1, Seiten 325–332
- with Georg Weissenberger and Fritz Schuster (1925): Über die Molekülverbindungen der Phenole. VIII. Die Lokalisierung des Restvalenzkraftfeldes. – Sitzungsberichte der Akademie der Wissenschaften mathematisch-naturwissenschaftliche Klasse 134_2b: 47–56.
- with Georg Weissenberger and Fritz Schuster (1925): Zur Kenntnis organischer Molekülverbindungen. IX. Die Gruppe – CCl3. – Sitzungsberichte der Akademie der Wissenschaften mathematisch-naturwissenschaftliche Klasse 134_2b: 57–60.
- with Georg Weissenberger and Lazar Bregmann (1925): Zur Kenntnis organischer Molekülverbindungen. XVI. Zweiwertige Phenole und ihre Äther. – Sitzungsberichte der Akademie der Wissenschaften mathematisch-naturwissenschaftliche Klasse 134_2b: 471–482.
- with Georg Weissenberger and Eugen Sperling (1925): Zur Kenntnis organischer Molekülverbindungen. XVII. Das Verhalten des Dekahydronaphthalins. – Sitzungsberichte der Akademie der Wissenschaften mathematisch-naturwissenschaftliche Klasse 134_2b: 483–497
- with Georg Weissenberger and Stanislaus Baumgarten (1925): Über die Adsorption an Kohle aus zähflüssigen Medien. – Sitzungsberichte der Akademie der Wissenschaften mathematisch-naturwissenschaftliche Klasse 134_2b: 679–700
- with Georg Weißenberger and Lazar Bregmann (1925): Zur Kenntnis organischer Molekülverbindungen. In: Monatshefte für Chemie/Chemical Monthly 01/1925; 46(7):471–482.
- with Georg Weissenberger and F. Sperlin (1925): Neue Wege der Gaswaschung V. Studien mit Hilfe von Beladungskurven. In: Angewandte Chemie 01/1925; 38(51):1161–1164
- with Georg Weissenberger and Fanny Kawenoki: Zur Kenntnis Binärer Flüssigkeitsgemische. XXII. Systeme mit Nitrobenzol und den Oxynitrobenzolen.
- with Georg Weissenberger and Hedwig Katschinka (1924): Zur Kenntnis binärer Flüssigkeitsgemische XX. Systeme mit substituierten Hydronaphthalinen. In: Die Fortschritte in der organischen Chemie seit dem Jahre, von Erich Lehmann
- with Georg Weissenberger: Zur Kenntnis binärer Flüssigkeitsgemische. XXI. Systeme mit Buttersäure
