= New Design University St. Pölten =

Coordinates: 48°11′15″N 15°37′9″E

- Motto: Normal ist gefährlich
- Motto in English: Standard is dangerous
- Type: Private
- Established: 2004
- Rector: Stephan Schmidt-Wulffen
- Location: Mariazeller Straße 97; 3100 St. Pölten, Austria, St. Pölten, Austria
- Website: www.ndu.ac.at

The New Design University St. Pölten is a private university in St. Pölten, Austria. It focuses primarily on interior design and graphic design studies.

== Alumni ==
- Matthias Laurenz Gräff (born 1984), artist
