= Helmuth Gräff =

Austrian painter (born 1958)

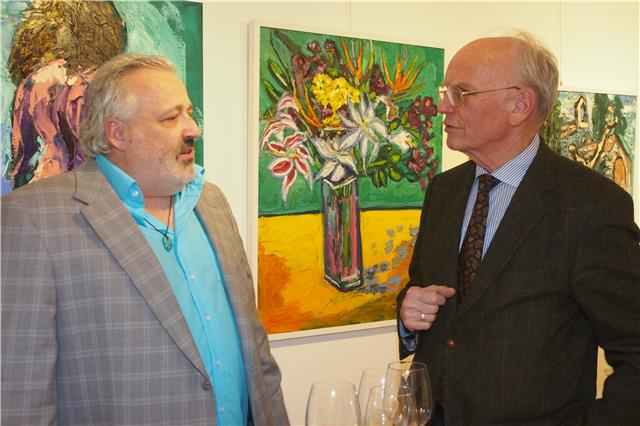
- Helmuth Gräff (left) and Günter Stummvoll, former Austrian Secretary of State
- Born: 12 April 1958 (age 68); Gars am Kamp, Austria
- Known for: Painter, drawer and poet
- Notable work: religious paintings, landscape paintings
- Movement: Expressionism
- Awards: 1st prize "Freunde der Akademie" (1983)
- Website: Helmuth Gräff official website

Helmuth Gräff (born 12 April 1958 in Gars am Kamp) is an Austrian painter, drawer and poet. Gräffs painterly style is rooted on the one hand in the artistic heritage of Vincent van Gogh, and on the other hand he can also be regarded as a precursor or heritage of the Neuen Wilde.

== Life ==
Helmuth Gräff is the youngest son of Rudolf Gräff (1919-2006), SPÖ local politician and lay judge, and Leopoldine Gräff (1923-2023; née Kimmerl) from Vienna-Schwechat, who belongs to the family of former imperial judge Matthias Kimmerl of Kaiserebersdorf (1818–1883), after whom Vienna's Kimmerlgasse is named. His paternal ancestors were politically active and religious free thinkers with their own family coat of arms (related to the dutch (De) Graeff family), and it is said that they are of old noble origin of the Carniolan area. Gräff was married first to Martina Maria Gach, daughter of the architect Richard Gach. His only son Matthias Laurenz Gräff works as an academic painter and political activist and in 2013 he became chairman of the worldwide Family Association Gräff-Graeff (Familienverband Gräff-Graeff e.V.).

In his youth Helmuth Gräff drew thousands of artworks and kept on practising until the age of 20 where he began to study at the Wiener Kunstschule by Fritz Martinz. Between 1979 and 1983 he studied art at the Academy of Fine Arts Vienna of Gustav Hessings and later Friedensreich Hundertwassers masterclass of painting. Since 1989 is Gräff self-employed as an academic painter, drawer and poet. The themes of his artworks are on the one hand compositions with spiritual and religious contents, and on the other hand works in the nature (Italy, France, Florida, Bali).

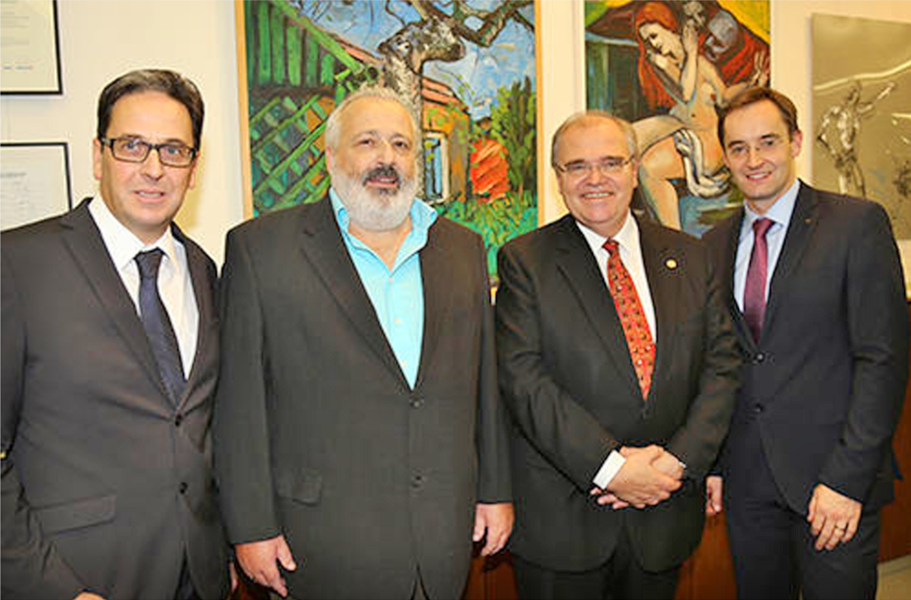
Exhibition, Helmuth Gräff (second left) with the Vice-Chancellor of Austria, Wolfgang Brandstetter (second right)

As a result of a sports accident and the fracture of three thoracic vertebrae in 1995, Helmuth Gräff suffered from persistent back pain, which increasingly impaired his artistic work. According to Gräff's own account on his website, in 2018 he attempted suicide with a 30-fold overdose of insulin, which resulted in a stroke. He did this because of his art collector's withdrawal of a "Richard Wagner Life Cycle" comprising several hundred drawings and oil paintings.

Gräff exhibited among others in the Palais Palffy, Palais Todesco and Museum of Young Art as well in the Leopold Museum Vienna. His artworks were auctionated at Dorotheum and Auktionshaus Im Kinsky.

== Collections ==
- Sammlung Dr. Rudolf Leopold (Leopold Museum), Vienna/AT
- Museum/Sammmlung Heinz Angerlehner, Upper Austria/AT

== Exhibitions ==
Solo Exhibitions:

- 2019 "Mein Leben für die Kunst", Kunstmuseum Waldviertel, Schrems, AT
- 2016 "Unterwegs ...", Palais Todesco, Vienna/AT
- 2014 "Memento mori", KunstSalon, Vienna/AT
- 2011 "La pura women's health resort kamptal", Gars am Kamp/AT
- 2010 "Intarsien - Eine malerische Rundreise", Palais Palffy, Vienna/AT
- 2010 "Frühlingskantate", Salon - Galerie Cornelia Mensdorff-Pouilly, Vienna/AT
- 2010 "Gräff meets OK", Oskar Kokoschka-Dokumentationszentrum, Pöchlarn/AT
- 2008 "Sunloft Center" und Wyvern Hotel, Punta Gorda, Florida/USA
- 2008 "Zwischen den Welten", Dommuseum, Vienna/AT
- 2008 "Zwischen den Welten", Buchpräsentation und Ausstellung, MOYA - Museum of Young Art, Vienna/AT
- 2007 Galerie Weihergut, Salzburg/AT

Group Exhibitions:

- 2015: "Matthias Laurenz Gräff und Helmuth Gräff. Zwischen den Welten - Zwischen den Generationen", Galerie Daliko, Krems an der Donau
- 2011 "The excitement continues - Zeitgenössische Kunst aus der Sammlung Leopold II", Leopold Museum, Vienna/AT
- 2011 "Gräff trifft Seitz", Exhibition with Friedrich Martin Seitz, The land of Lower Austria-Ausstellungsbrücke, St. Pölten/AT

== Literature ==
- Heinrich Fuchs, Die österreichischen Maler des 20. Jahrhunderts. Ergänzungsband 1, p. 69
- Helmuth Gräff. Edition Thurnhof, Heft No 5, anlässlich der Personalausstellung in der Horner Galerie Thurnhof, 1990, 20 pages.
- Helmuth Gräff, Akt - Landschaft - Allegorie. Edition M wie Kunst in der Bibliothek der Provinz. Verlag für Literatur, Kunst und Musikalien, 2005, 102 pages. ISBN 3-85252-645-0.
- Helmuth Gräff, Zwischen den Welten. Dionysisch - Apollinisch - Erde - Wasser - Feuer - Luft. Verlag Bibliothek der Provinz, 2008, 222 pages. ISBN 978-3-85252-908-0
