= Matthias Laurenz Gräff =

Austrian artist, historian, politician (born 1984)

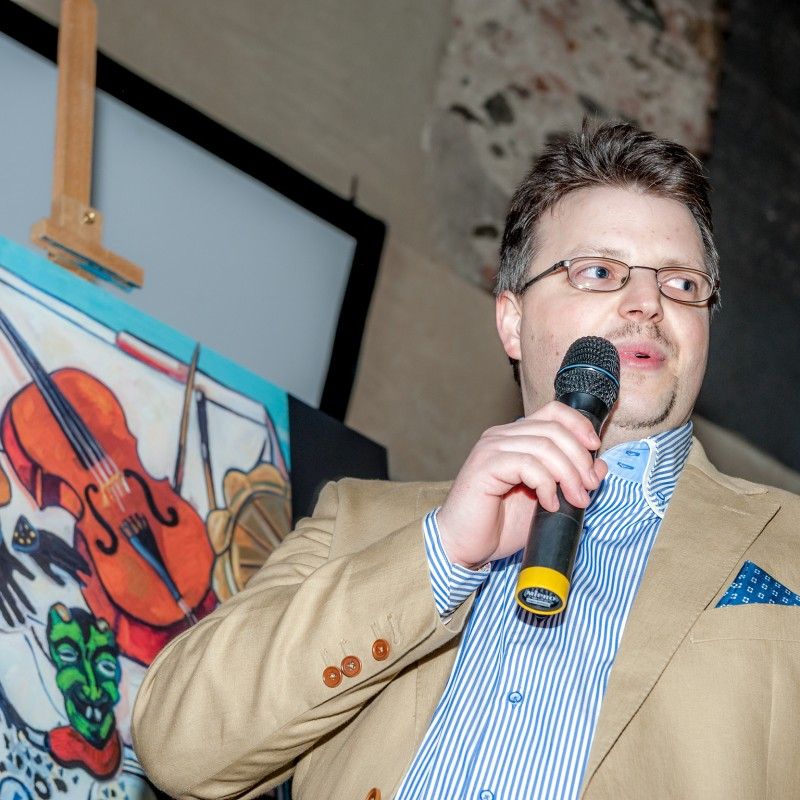
- Matthias Laurenz Gräff in 2016
- Born: 19 July 1984 (age 42); Gars am Kamp, Lower Austria
- Known for: painting, drawing
- Notable work: political paintings
- Movement: Expressionism, Expressive Realism, Modern art, Pop art
- Awards: Adolf Peschek public Award (City museum of St. Pölten, 2014)
- Website: Official website

Matthias Laurenz Gräff
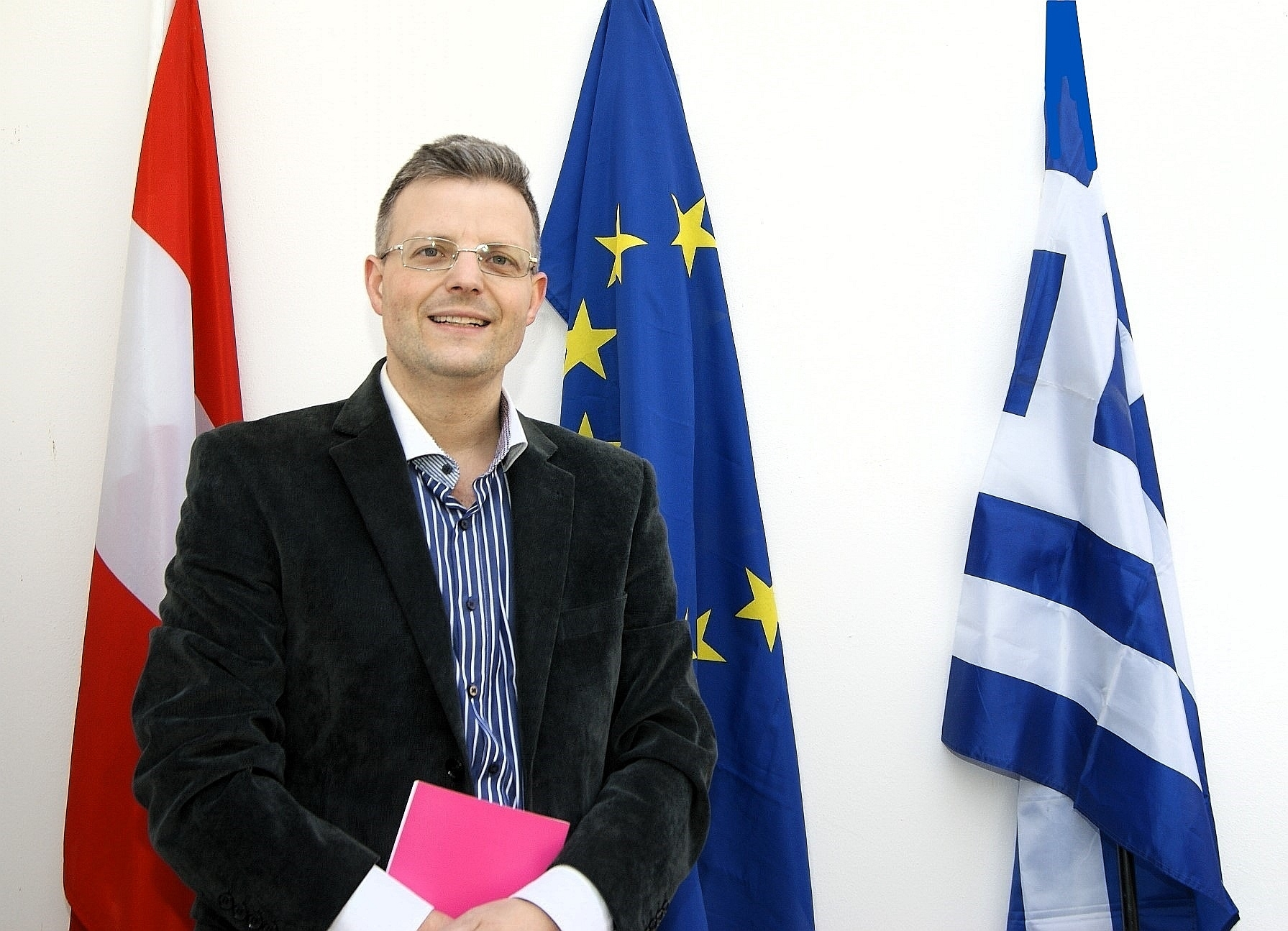

Chairman of the worldwide Family Association Gräff-Graeff
- Incumbent
- Assumed office 1 August 2013

NEOS Representative for Greece
- Incumbent
- Assumed office 25 March 2024

Personal details
- Party: NEOS – The New Austria and Liberal Forum
- Spouse: Georgia Kazantzidu
- Parents: Helmuth Gräff (father); Martina Maria Elisabeth Gräff (mother)
- Website: NEOS Representative Matthias Laurenz Gräff

Matthias Laurenz Gräff (also known as Matthias Laurenz Gräff Ilpenstein; born 19 July 1984) is an Austrian-Greek academic painter, private historian, politician, political activist and co-founder and organizer of the non-partisan platform Dialog im Kamptal. Since 2013 Gräff has served as chairman of the worldwide Family Association Gräff-Graeff and since 2024 as the official Representative of the NEOS parliamentary party for Greece.

== Biography ==
=== Family ===
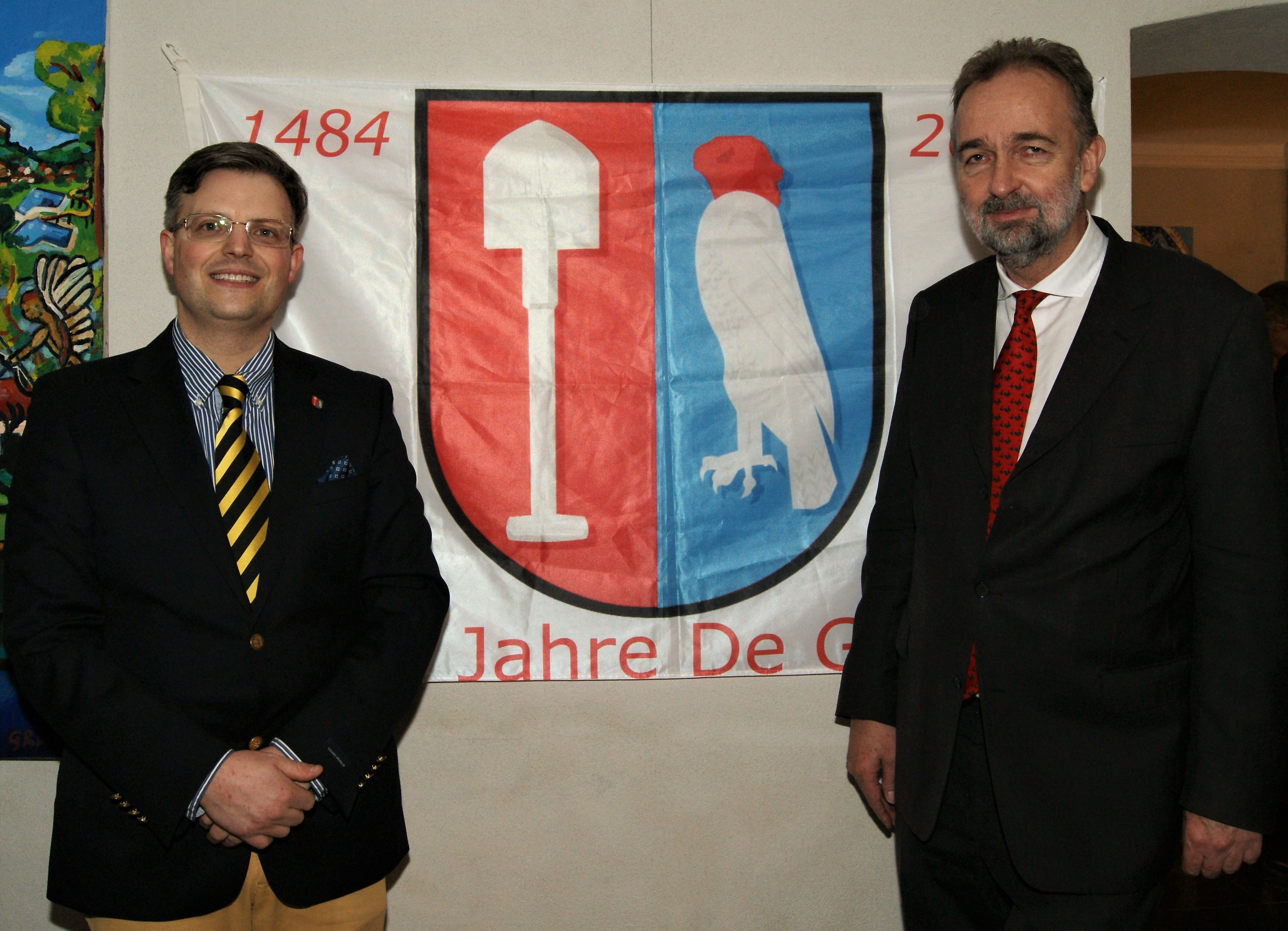
Matthias Laurenz Gräff and Karl von Habsburg - head of the Habsburg-Lorraine family, the former Roman-German and Austrian imperial families - in front of Graeff's coat of arms (2022)

Matthias Laurenz Gräff was born into an Austrian family of several politicians and artists. He is the child of Helmuth Gräff, an academic painter, and Martina Maria Elisabeth Gräff (née Gach), art professor, daughter of the architect Richard Gach (1930-1991) and granddaughter of the chemist Richard Henke (1900-1963). One of his other direct ancestors was the Imperial Austrian judge Matthias Kimmerl (1818-1883), after whom Vienna's Kimmerlgasse is named. Gräff's paternal ancestors were politically active and religious free thinkers with their own coat of arms, who belonged to an extramarital branch of the dutch noble and patrician family (De) Graeff. It is said that they are of old noble origin and came oroginally from the Carniolan area. As one of the family's heirs, Gräff became chairman of the global Family Association Gräff-Graeff (Familienverband Gräff-Graeff e.V.) in 2013.

Since 2010, Gräff has been in a civil partnership with Greek-born Georgia Kazantzidu, a Webster Vienna Private University graduate, local SPÖ politician and journalist, with whom he runs various joint projects. Gräff is Philhellene and the couple live in Gars am Kamp, Austria and Platamon, Greece.

=== Art ===
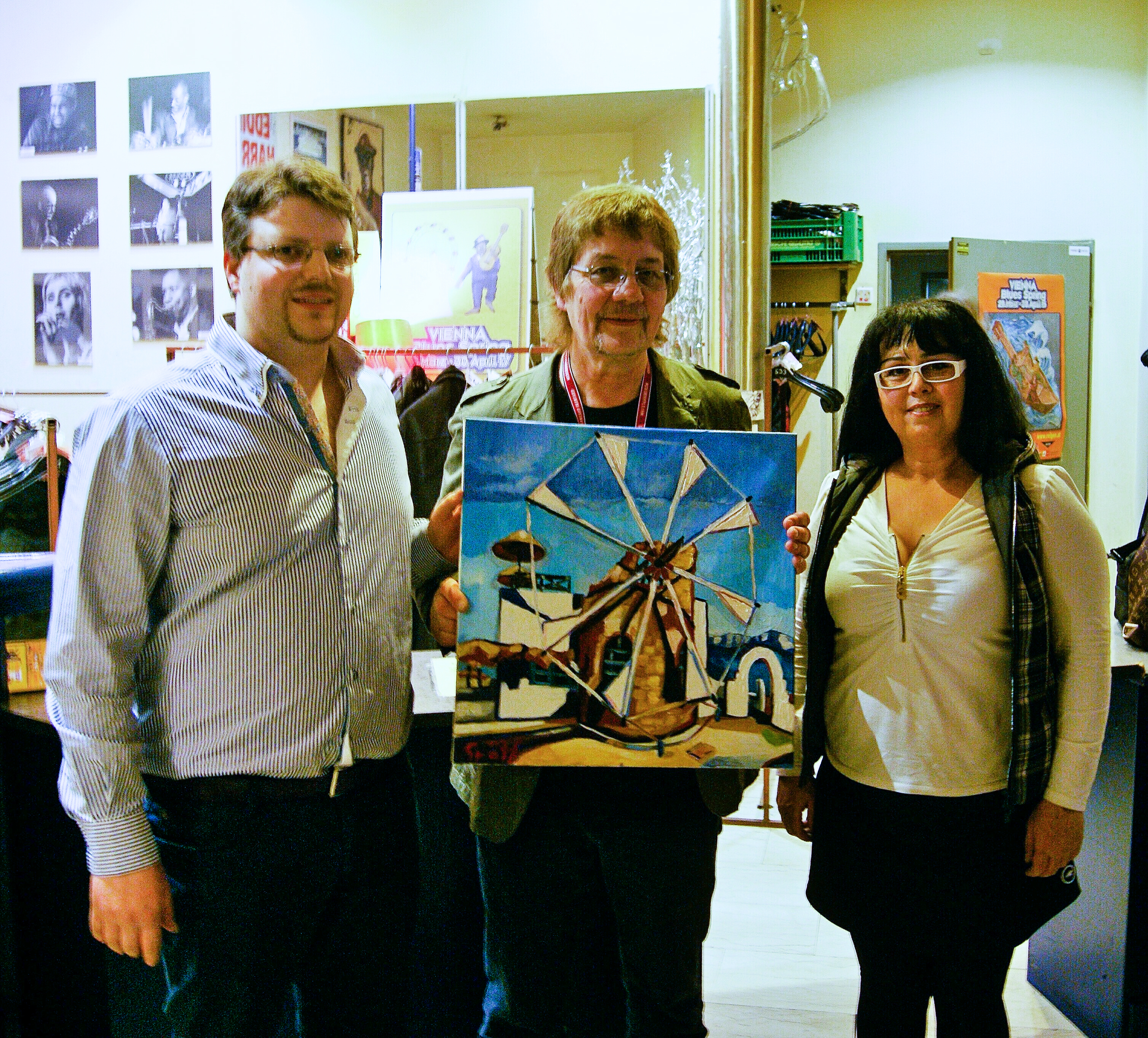
Artist meeting with Don Airey of Deep Purple (shown Matthias Laurenz Gräff, Don Airey and Georgia Kazantzidu)

Matthias Laurenz Gräff began drawing at a very young age. In 2001, at the age of 17, he began to study illustration and graphic at the private New Design University St. Pölten, and in the following years he took part at the summer academy of Geras of Bernhard Hollemann. From 2002 to 2008 he studied at Wolfgang Herzig's masterclass of painting at the University of Applied Arts Vienna. Gräff then studied philosophy with Elisabeth von Samsonow at the Academy of Fine Arts in Vienna. In his artistic work he combines a certain expressionism influenced by pop art with the expression of different genres: historical, political, religious works, urban or rural landscapes, nudes, flower pieces, portraits, interieurs and stilllifes, including painting of vanities.

Matthias Laurenz Gräff is member of the St. Pöltner Künstlerbund (Art union). In 2010, at the 64th annual fair of the Künstlerbund, he received the "Adolf Peschek Preis" (Adolf Peschek Public Award) in the Museum of the City of St. Pölten. Two years later Gräff created the painting for the vine etiquette of the Red Cross in Lower Austria. In 2013, upon the occasion of the celebration of the sister city of his hometown Gars am Kamp, Gars am Inn in Germany, he created the official twin city painting. In 2014, Gräff was commissioned to create three paintings for the vine etiquettes "Garser Wein 2014". A local businessman boycott the publishing of the etiquettes about the illustration of a half naked woman, and this led to a little media scandal in Austria. Two years later, Gräff again received from the mayor's bureau of Gars am Kamp a contract to create three paintings for the vine etiquettes "Garser Wein 2016" (10 years Garser Wein).

In his paintings, Gräff also deals with literary themes, including the implementation of the content of the author Erich Maria Remarque. He participated in large memorial exhibitions in the Erich Maria Remarque Peace Center in Osnabrück. The museum also features paintings by Gräff. His painting “Der Weg zurück" (The Way Back) is also used in books about Remarque published by the University of Osnabrück and the Erich Maria Remarque Peace Center Osnabrück.

==== Historical paintings ====
Matthias Laurenz Gräff is also active in history painting. His diploma series (Magister artium) from 2007/2008 entitled Weltaussenschau-Weltinnenschau shows a seven-part series of paintings with depictions of historical figures and numerous protagonists of the De Graeff family, mostly from the Dutch Golden Age. In the years that followed, Gräff painted historical characters and circumstances. Various of these paintings have also been used in essays by historians, including Asle Toje, member of the Norwegian Nobel Committee, and german university professor Ronald G. Asch. In a commissioned work for the Lions Club, Gräff drew portraits of 20th-century pacifists on a life-size lion. It thus serves as a carrier of a humanistic, socially just and ethical attitude.

=== Politics ===
==== Art and politics ====
Matthias Laurenz Gräff has been working on contemporary images of political and social criticism since 2015, which have been published several times in newspapers, blogs and books on national and international politics. Important topics are anti-fascism, socialism, anti-nationalist and pro-European, He also deals with socio-political issues and critical processes in Austrian society and politics. In relation of the 2019 European Parliament election, Gräff created a pro-European painting in collaboration with the Austrian party NEOS. The Erich Maria Remarque-Friedenszentrum (University of Osnabrück) wrote about Gräff: He consistently represents humanistic, anti-nationalist and pro-European positions both in his art and in various exchange and discussion programs organized by him.

==== Dialog im Kamptal ====
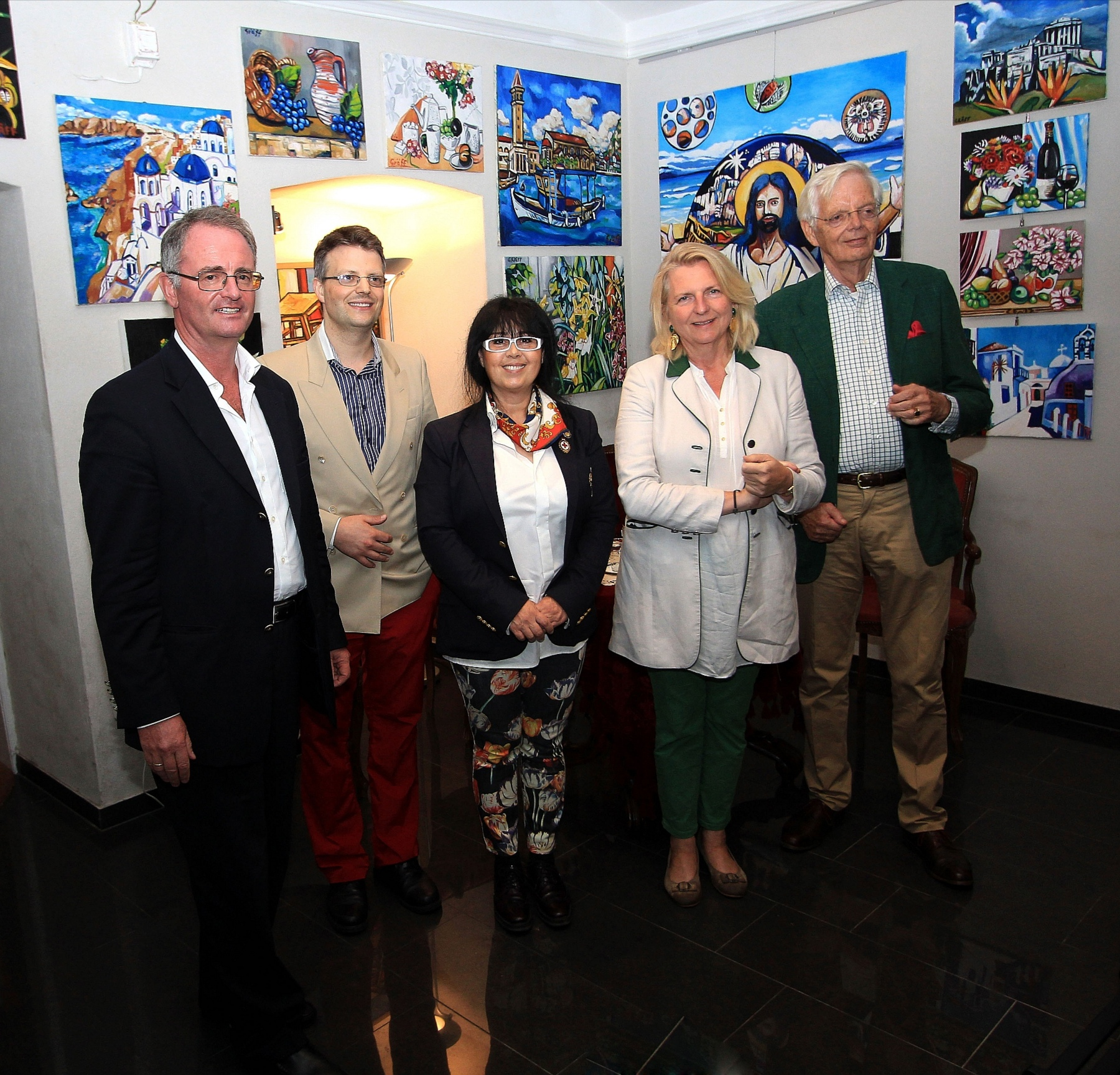
Georg Vetter, Matthias Laurenz Gräff, Georgia Kazantzidu, Karin Kneissl and Michael Breisky (Dialog im Kamptal, 2020)

Matthias Laurenz Gräff and Georgia Kazantzidu organizes the non-partisan political and diplomatic platform Dialog im Kamptal (Dialogue in Kamptal) in the art studio Gräff - house Kazantzidu in Gars am Kamp. The events aim to inform, exchange and dialogue on relevant political, diplomatic and social issues. Erhard Busek, Wolfgang Brandstetter, Karin Kneissl, Hannes Swoboda, Helmut Brandstätter, Emil Brix, Wolfgang Petritsch, Karl von Habsburg among other, took part in the events.

==== Politician ====
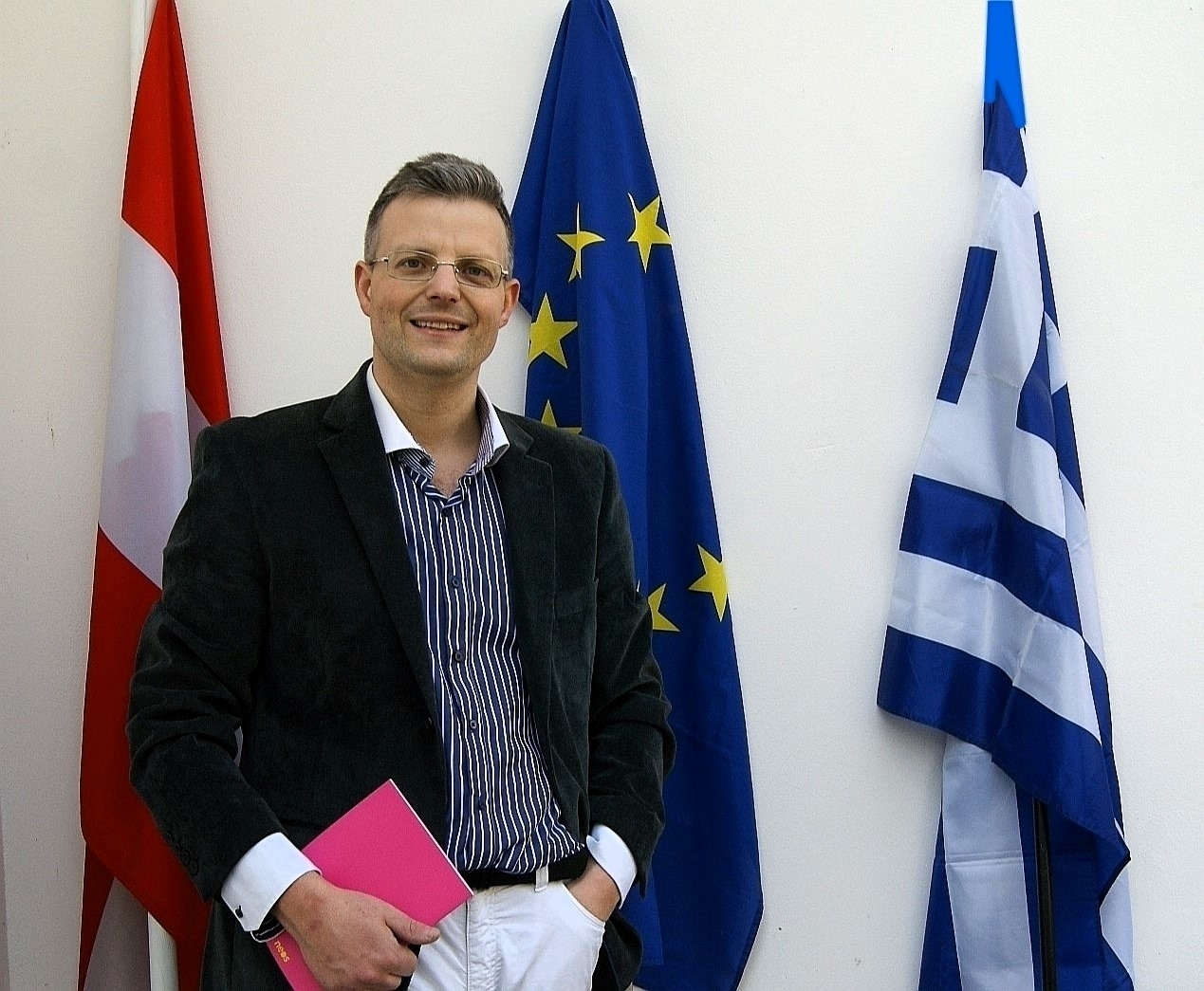
Matthias Laurenz Gräff, official NEOS Representative for Greece

Matthias Laurenz Gräff has been politically active as a community representative in Gars am Kamp for the Austrian liberal parliamentary party NEOS since 2022. He has been also a candidate for the Lower Austrian state elections in 2023, and here as a candidate for the Waldviertel region and as a top candidate for the Horn district. In 2024 he is one of the pre-candidates for the European elections.

In March 2024 Matthias Laurenz Gräff took over the role of official Representative for Greece for the parliamentary party NEOS. The state representatives are part of the state organization NEOS X - International, in which politics is made by and for Austrians abroad. Gräff represents NEOS in Greece both internally and externally. In addition to representing Austrians abroad, this function also includes establishing contacts and cooperation with liberal Greek parties.

== Artistic summary ==
=== Exhibitions (selection) ===
- 2023, „Networking Remarque“, Erich Maria Remarque Friedenszentrum Osnabrück
- 2023, „Ein Geschenk für Remarque“, Erich Maria Remarque Friedenszentrum Osnabrück
- 2020, "Weltweit Worldwide Remarque", Erich Maria Remarque Friedenszentrum Osnabrück
- "Deep Purple - Art and History - The exhibition". Celebrating 50 years of Deep Purple, Kunsthalle Köln-Lindenthal/Ger
- Gräff organized artist meetings with Nick Simper and Don Airey, musicians of Deep Purple in Vienna
- in 2017 he organized a charity campaign in favor of Polyneuropathy at WUK Vienna/AT ("Benefizausstellung zugunsten Polyneuropathie")
- "Garser Wein 2016", 10 years Garser wine at "Weinfest '16", Gars am Kamp
- "Der Anreiz des Seins, Allegorie - Stillleben - Landschaft", Kunst im Waldviertel, Kunst & Seminarhotel Geras/AT
- "Liebreizendes Griechenland", KunstSalon im Wiener Botschaftsviertel, Vienna/AT
- "Matthias Laurenz Gräff und Helmuth Gräff", Galerie Daliko, Krems an der Donau/AT
- Steirerschlössl Zeltweg, Red Bull Project Spielberg/AT
- Cityhall Korneuburg/AT
- Erstes österreichisches Museum für Alltagsgeschichte, Neupölla/AT
- Red Cross Lower Austria, Tulln an der Donau/AT
- Gaming Charterhouse/AT
- Siemens AG Headquarter, Linz/AT
- St. Pöltner Künstlerbund, Museum of the City of St. Pölten/AT
- Galerie Austria/AT
- Advent im Wiener Rathaus 2008 and ORF (Austrian broadcaster), Vienna/AT
- Diplom exhibition 2008, University of Applied Arts, Vienna/AT
- Kunsthalle Wien-Karlsplatz project space, Vienna/AT

=== Collections (selection) ===
- Erich Maria Remarque Friedenszentrum (Erich Maria Remarque Peace Center) Osnabrück/Ger
- Karl von Habsburg, head of the former imperial and royal house of Austria and the Holy Roman Empire
- Dr Karin Kneissl, former Foreign Minister of Austria
- Dr Erhard Busek, former Vice Chancellor of Austria
- Don Airey (Member of Deep Purple), England
- Dr Alexander Van der Bellen, 12th President of Austria, Vienna/AT
- Community of Gars am Kamp/AT
- Nick Simper (Founding member of Deep Purple), England
- Embassy of Greece in Vienna/AT/GRE
- Schloss Kornberg Castle, collection of the Counts of Bardeau/Grafen von Bardeau/AT
- Community of Gars am Inn/GER
- Community of Neupölla/AT
- Red Cross of Lower Austria, Tulln an der Donau/AT
- Austrian Red Cross, Vienna/AT
- Art Collection University of Applied Arts, Vienna/AT
- Geras Abbey, Geras/AT

== Family Association Gräff-Graeff ==
Family Association Gräff-Graeff
- Formation: 2013
- Type: Family association
- Members: Gräff, Graeff, De Graeff family lines
- Chairman: Matthias Laurenz Gräff
- Vice Chairman: Rudolf Gräff jr
- Main organ: General assembly
- Website: familienverbandgraeff.at

In 2013 Matthias Laurenz Gräff became co-founder and chairman of the worldwide Family Association Gräff-Graeff (German: Familienverband Gräff-Graeff e.V.), an organization for descendants of the (De) Graeff families, including the Dutch De Graeff line, alleged descendants of Austrian noble Wolfgang von Graben († 1521) from the dynastic Von Graben family. It was created in 2013 and officially registered in Austria.

== Literature (selection) ==
- "Networking Remarque: Zum 125. Geburtstag Erich Maria Remarques". Alice Cadeddu, Claudia Junk, Thomas F. Schneider, V&R Unipress, 2024, ISBN 978-3-8470-1699-1
- "L’Enjeu mondial : Populismes au pouvoir", Alain Dieckhoff, Christophe Jaffrelot, Élise Massicard, Paris: Presses de Sciences Po, 2019, p. 177, ISBN 978-2-7246-2500-4
- Sabrina Redhead, Ausstellungskatalog Kunst im Murtal" 2014, "Kunst - Tradition und Aufbruch" 2014, Ausstellung im Steirerschlössl Zeltweg, Red Bull Projekt Spielberg; accessed 7 August 2015. (in German)
- Univ-Doz Dr. Friedrich Polleross: Gemälde von Matthias Laurenz Gräff im Museum in Neupölla. In: Das Waldviertel, herausgegeben vom Waldviertler Heimatbund
- Helmuth Gräff, "Zwischen den Welten", Verlag Bibliothek der Provinz, pp. 134–35, 2008; accessed 7 August 2015. (in German)
- Universität für Angewandte Kunst, Diplome Sommersemester 2007/08; accessed 7 August 2015. (in German)
- "Parasite | Paradise", Interventionen zeitgenössischer Kunst auf Burg Forchtenstein, pp. 78–79; accessed 7 August 2015. (in German)
- Vision magacine of China VISION Magacine, March 2006, "Metempsychosis of Art", p. 108/111; (Chinese)
- Matthias Laurenz Gräff. Allegorie-Stillleben-Landschaft; accessed 7 August 2015. (in German)
