= Richard Gach =

Austrian architect and artist (1930–1991)

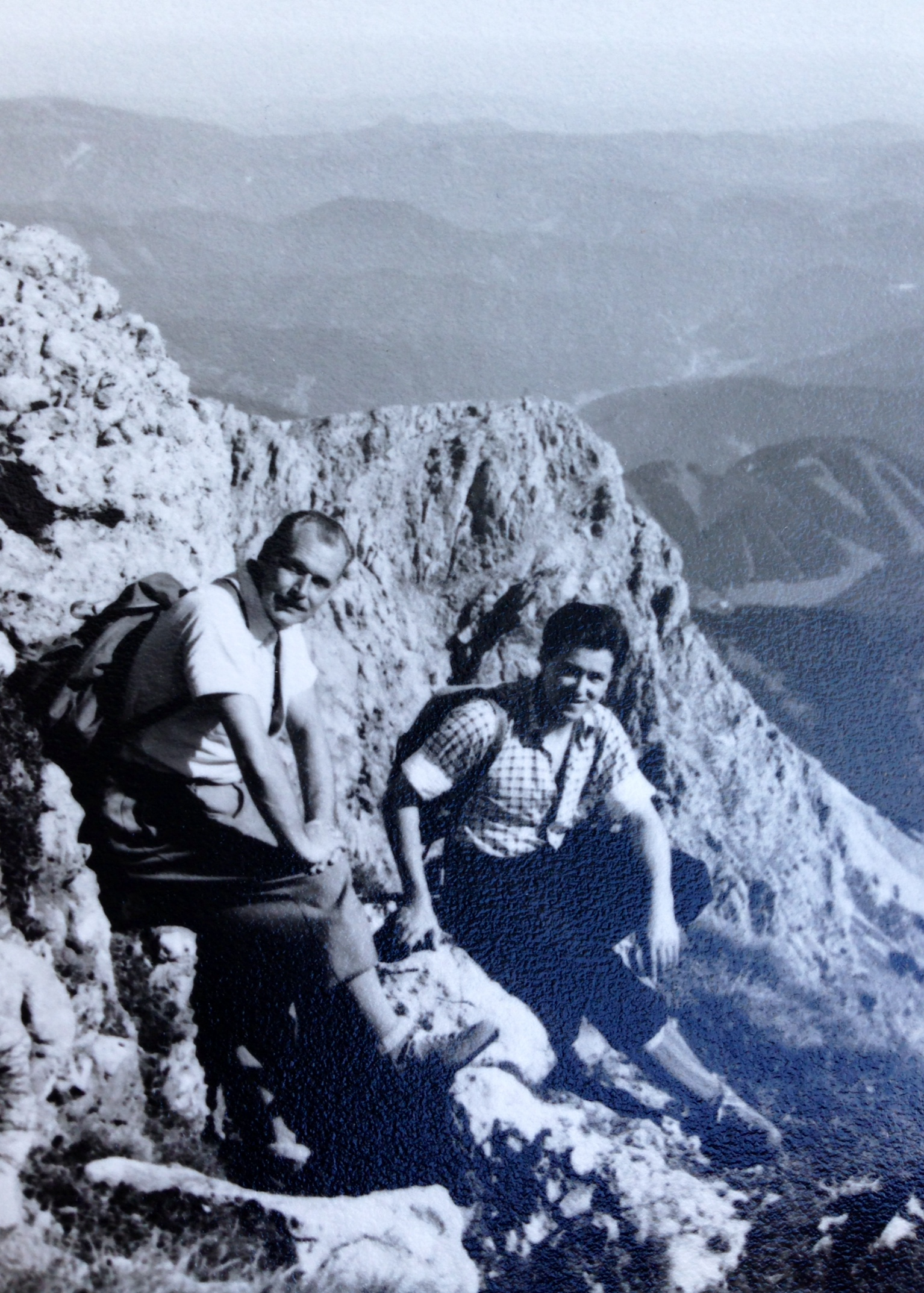
- Richard Gach (right) with his father-in-law Richard Henke hiking in Salzburg (1957/58)
- Born: 31 October 1930; Itzling
- Died: 25 December 1991 (aged 61); Horn, Austria
- Education: Academy of Fine Arts Vienna
- Occupation: Architect
- Spouse: Johanna Henke
- Children: Christian, Martina Maria and Richard Gach; Martin Gartner
- Parent(s): Johann and Johanna Gach
- Awards: several architectural competitions
- Buildings: Aufbahrungshalle, Orth an der Donau
- Projects: Town planning competition, Eisenstadtplatz, Vienna

Richard Gach (31 October 1930 – 25 December 1991) was an Austrian architect, sketch artist, and watercolorist. He mainly designed schools for the city of Vienna and was involved in the construction of some residential buildings.

== Biography ==
=== Private ===
Richard Gach was born in Itzling (then the municipality Gnigl-Itzling, today district of Salzburg). The Gach-Gräff family included several artists. Gach married Johanna Henke, daughter of the chemist Richard Henke. One of their daughters, Martina Maria Elisabeth Gach, a professor for art, married the artist Helmuth Gräff, and was the mother of the artist Matthias Laurenz Gräff. Gach was a member of the Schlaraffia society under the religious name "Knight of Kamp". He died in Horn.

=== Professional ===
Richard Gach completed the Salzburg HTL for Building Construction and in 1949 he studied architecture at the Academy of Fine Arts Vienna in the class of Lois Welzenbacher. As a student he built the scale model for the construction of the Wiener Stadthalle at the request of the architect Roland Rainer. During his studies he became friends with architects such as Gustav Peichl, Friedrich Achleitner, Wilhelm Holzbauer, and Hans Puchhammer. He graduated in 1955 with a Mag. Arch. and began work in the architecture office of Wilhelm Hubatsch, with whom he later won several architectural competitions.

After becoming an independent architect in 1958, Gach actively contributed to the construction of Viennese housing and schools. The Gach-designed Gangschule with 24 classes and two high schools comes from the "haze circle" of Hubatsch's school concepts. This concept is typified by the residential complex Edergasse 1-3 in Vienna 21 and the two high schools Hernalser Gymnasium Geblergasse and Amerling-Gymnasium. In 1970, the former Esterhazypalais (Palais Kaunitz) was demolished for the construction of the Amerling Gymnasium. Built in 1970-1972, the new building with 24 classrooms and two sports halls corresponds to the common typology used in the construction of secondary schools in the late sixties, without any architectural respect for the environment.

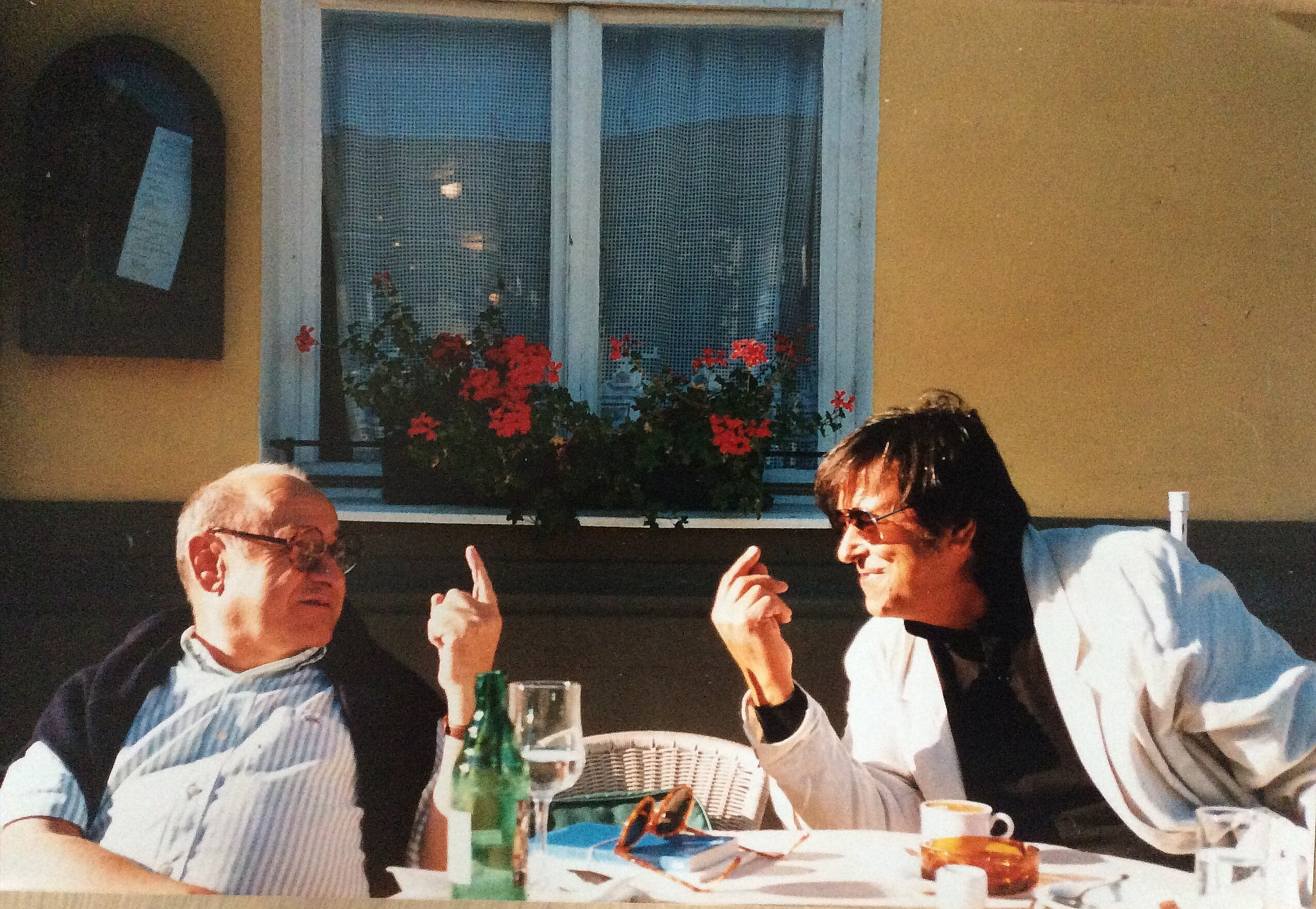
Richard Gach (right) and Gustav Peichl in Gars am Kamp (1990)

It was also important to him to build contemporary architecture, also in the context of church building. He planned the church building of Rigau at Abtenau (Salzburg) with Robert Posch in 1956. The project failed because of the Pinzgau district authority. The Wiener Wochenpresse headline said that the planning ended up being "customary" (i.e. traditional).

Richard Gach was also active in Lower Austria, as reflected in numerous construction projects such as the Aufbahrungshalle in Orth an der Donau, the Bundesgymnasium and Bundesrealgymnasium Amstetten (high school), the Sparkasse Mistelbach and the Hauptschule Gars am Kamp. Gach lived in his adopted home Gars am Kamp until his death. In 2011, a portion of his artistic estate, consisting of architectural drawings and watercolors, was auctioned there.

== Construction contracts (selection) ==
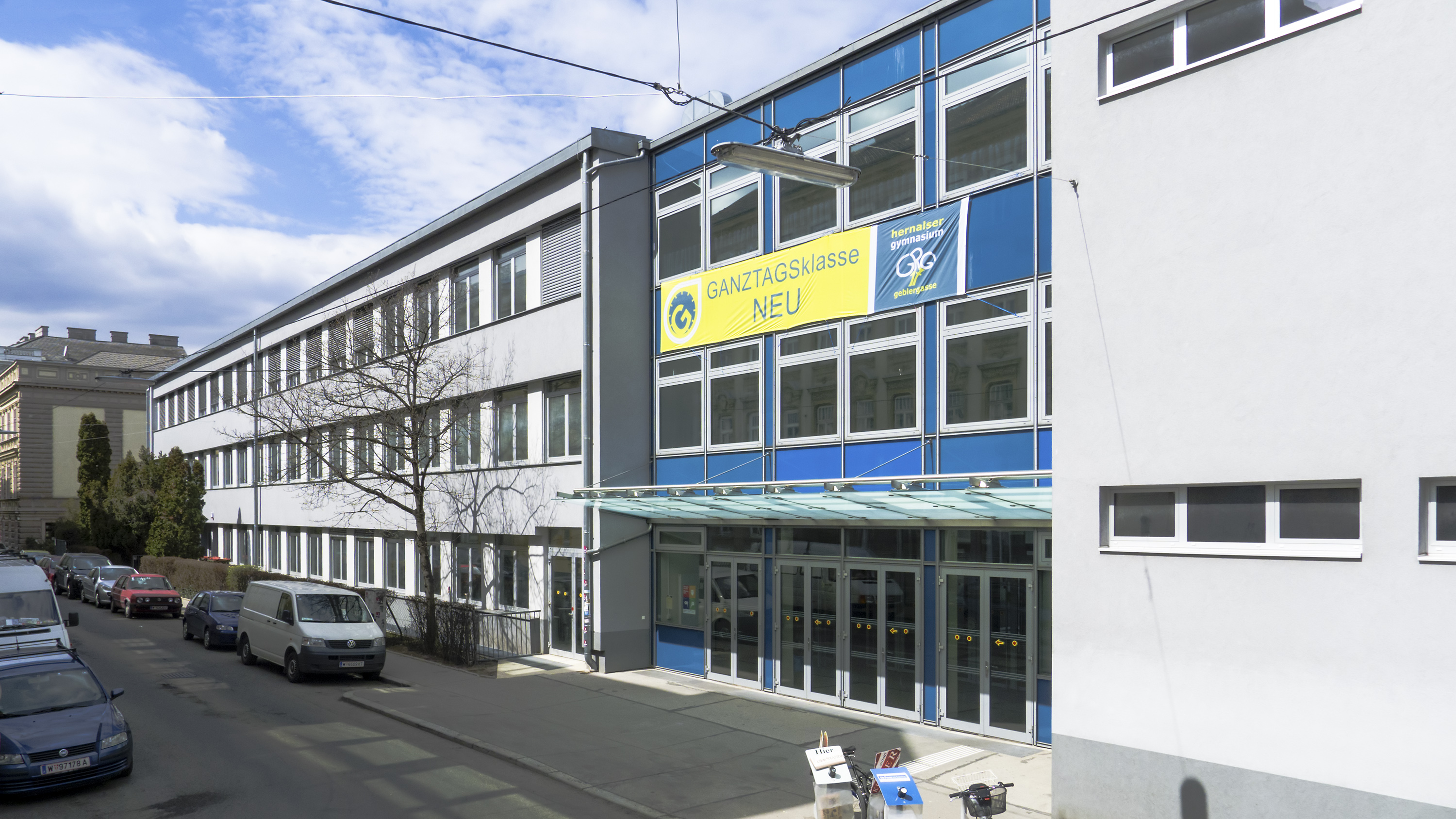
Gymnasium Wien Geblergasse (highschool)

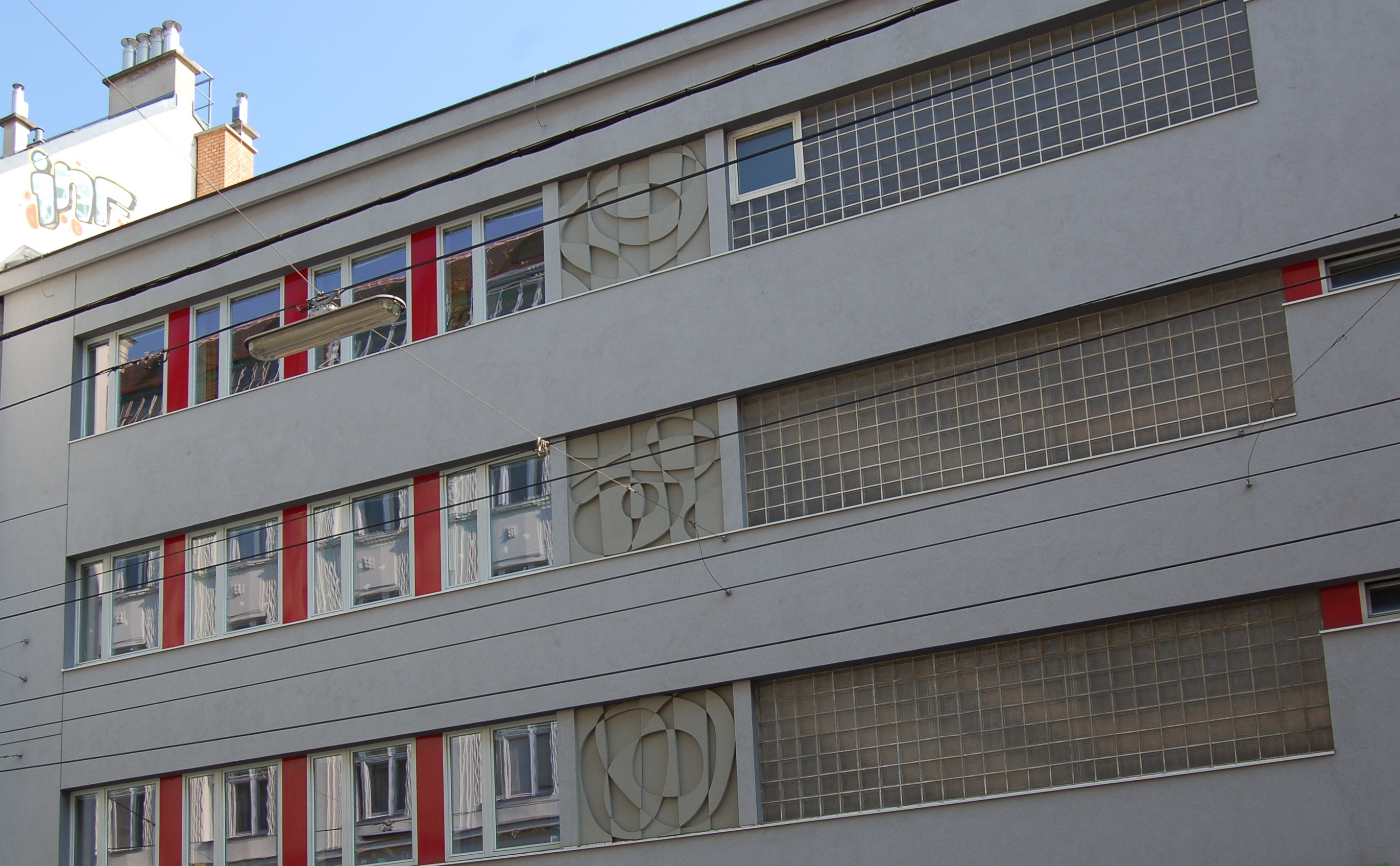
The listed concrete relief (Hauszeichen, Drei Betonreliefs) in Josefstädter Straße 93-97 in Wien-Josefstadt

- 1958: Housing estate Nußberggasse 9 / Bockkellergasse, Vienna 19 (with Wilhelm Hubatsch)
- 1960: Bundesgymnasium and Bundesrealgymnasium Amstetten (highschool) (with Wilhelm Hubatsch, Competition 1st Prize
- 1962-1964: Residential building Edergasse 1-3, Vienna 21
- 1963: Josefstädter Straße 93-97, Vienna 8 (with Ernst Schuster)
- 1964: elementary school Pfeilgasse and new middle school Pfeilgasse. Pfeilgasse 42b / Stolzenthalergasse 19, Vienna 8 (with Ernst Schuster)
- 1964-1966: Sparkasse Mistelbach
- 1964-1968: Hauptschule Gars am Kamp
- 1968: Hernalser Gymnasium Geblergasse (highschool), Vienna 17
- 1960 / 70s: Aufbahrungshalle in Orth on the Danube
- 1970-1972: Amerling-Gymnasium (highschool), Vienna 6
- 1973-1977: Residence Leopold-Figl-Gasse 503/504 and 523/524, Gars am Kamp

== Non-realistic objects (selection) ==
- 1956: Church building of Rigau near Abtenau (Pongau) (with Robert Posch)
- 1956: Bundesrealgymnasium Horn (highschool) (with Wilhelm Hubatsch, competition, 2nd prize
- 1957: Administration Building Austrian Drau Power Plants, Klagenfurt (with Wilhelm Hubatsch, Competition, 1st Prize)
- 1958: Town Planning Competition, Vienna 10, Eisenstadtplatz (with Wilhelm Hubatsch, Competition, 2nd Prize)
