= Palais Pálffy =

Former palace in Vienna, Austria

Coordinates: 48.2062°N 16.3674°E

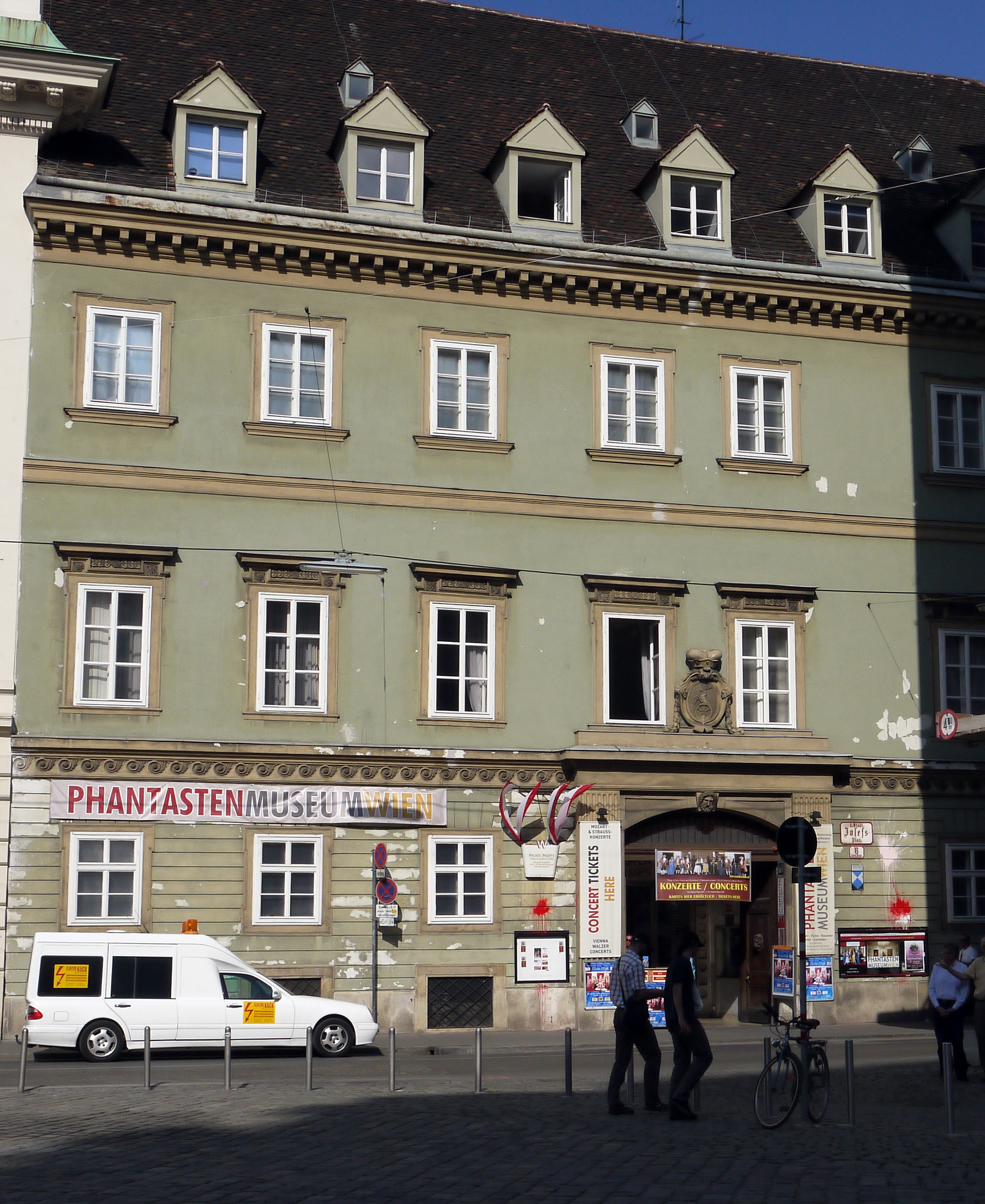
Palais Pálffy on Josefsplatz in Vienna, Austria.

Palais Pálffy (English: Pálffy Palace) is a palace located on Josefsplatz in the Innere Stadt (inner city) district of Vienna, Austria. It was once owned by the noble Pálffy family.

Today, the building is used for music performances and various kinds of public functions. The Phantasten Museum is located in the Palais.

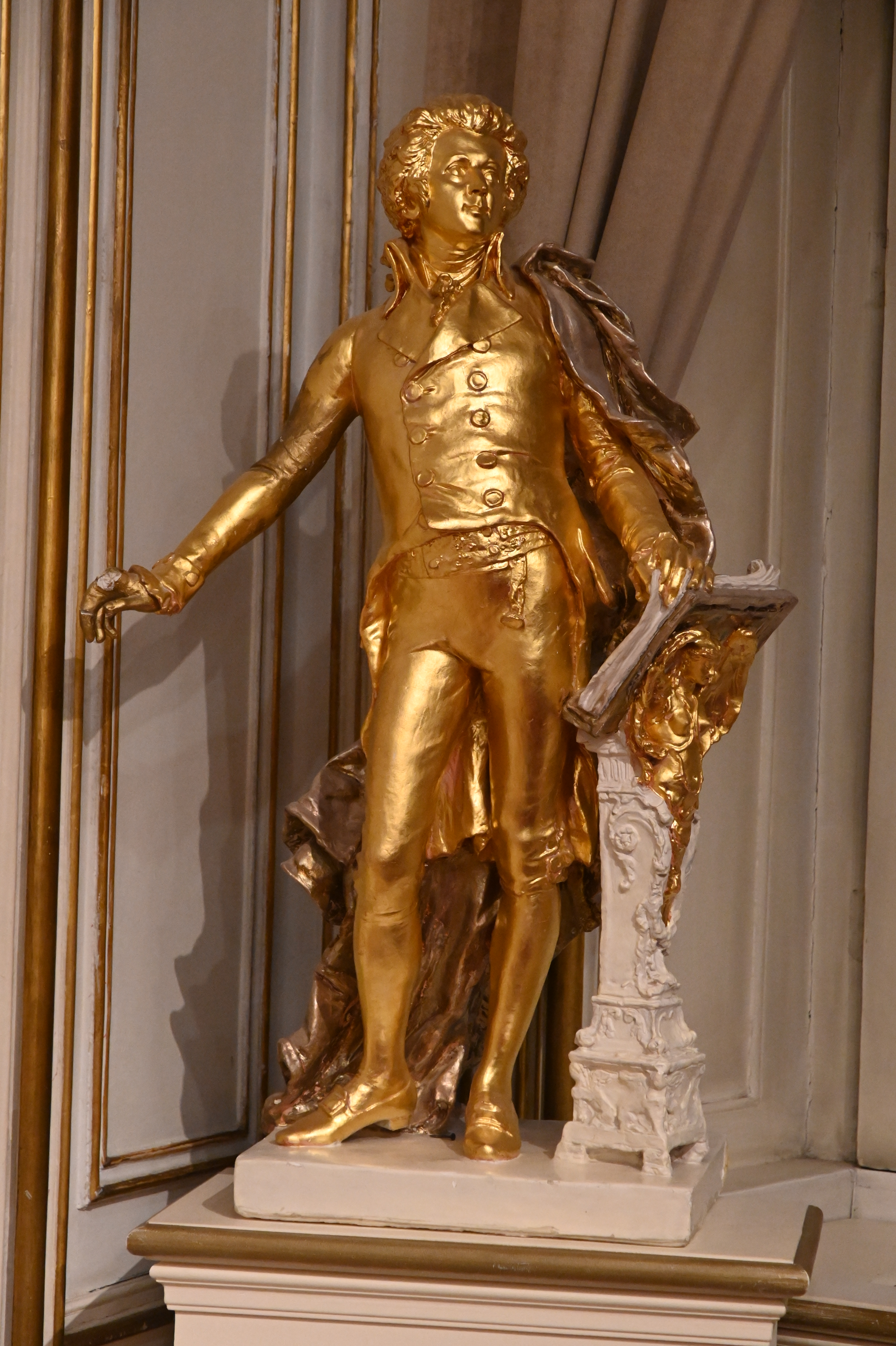
Mozart in Palais Palffy
